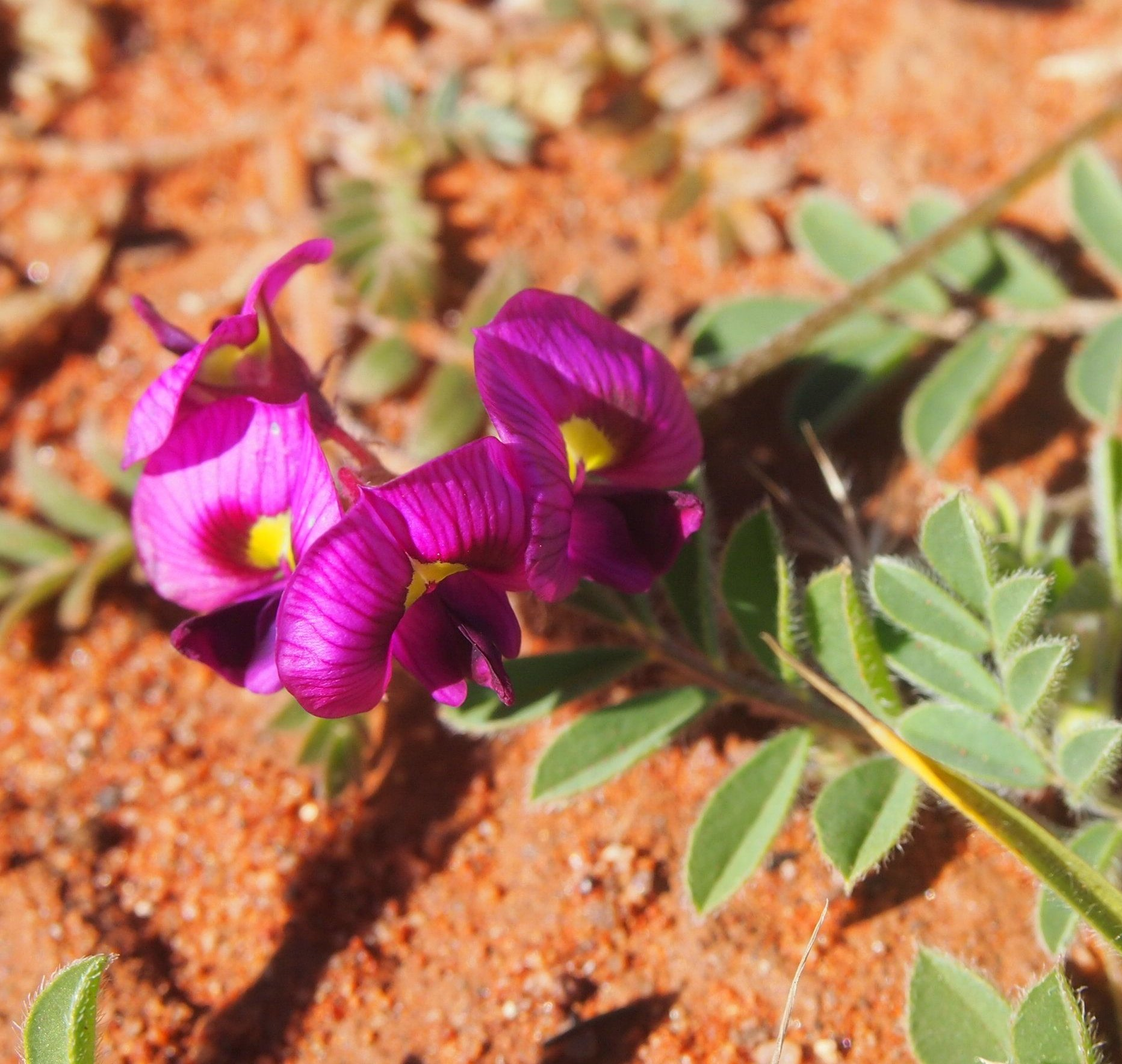

Scientific classification
- Kingdom: Plantae
- Clade: Tracheophytes
- Clade: Angiosperms
- Clade: Eudicots
- Clade: Rosids
- Order: Fabales
- Family: Fabaceae
- Subfamily: Faboideae
- Genus: Swainsona
- Species: S. burkei

Binomial name
- Swainsona burkei F.Muell. ex Benth.

Synonyms
- Swainsona burkei F.Muell. ex Benth. subsp. burkei; Swainsonia burkei F.Muell. orth. var.

= Swainsona burkei =

Species of plant endemic to Australia

Swainsona burkei is a species of flowering plant in the family Fabaceae and is endemic to northern Australia. It is a prostrate or perennial subshrub with imparipinnate leaves usually with 5 to 11 oblong to narrowly egg-shaped leaflets, and racemes of 5 to 10 purple flowers.

== Description ==
Swainsona burkei is a prostrate or perennial subshrub that typically grows to a height of 30–40 cm (12–16 in) with many slender stems arising from its base. Its leaves are imparipinnate, 2–7 cm (0.79–2.76 in) long with stipules 5–10 mm (0.20–0.39 in) long at the base. There are 5 to 11 oblong to narrowly leaflets with the narrower end towards the base, mostly 10–30 mm (0.39–1.18 in) and 3–10 mm (0.12–0.39 in) wide. The flowers are arranged in racemes 1–30 mm (0.039–1.181 in) long of 5 to 10, each flower on a pedicel 0.5–15 mm (0.020–0.591 in) wide. The sepals are joined at the base, forming a tube about 1.5 mm (0.059 in) long, the sepal lobes often three or more longer than the sepal tube. The petals are purple, occasionally pink or white, the standard petal 9–11 mm (0.35–0.43 in) long, the wings 6–8 mm (0.24–0.31 in) long, and the keel 7–9 mm (0.28–0.35 in) long. The fruit is a more or less oblong pod 8–15 mm (0.31–0.59 in) long and 6–7 mm (0.24–0.28 in) wide with the remains of the style 4–5 mm (0.16–0.20 in) long.

== Taxonomy and naming ==
Swainsona burkei was first formally described in 1864 by George Bentham in Flora Australiensis from an unpublished description of Ferdinand von Mueller. Bentham's description was published in his Flora Australiensis.

== Distribution and habitat ==
This species of swainsona grows in grassland and woodland in the central parts of the Northern Territory and in western Queensland.
