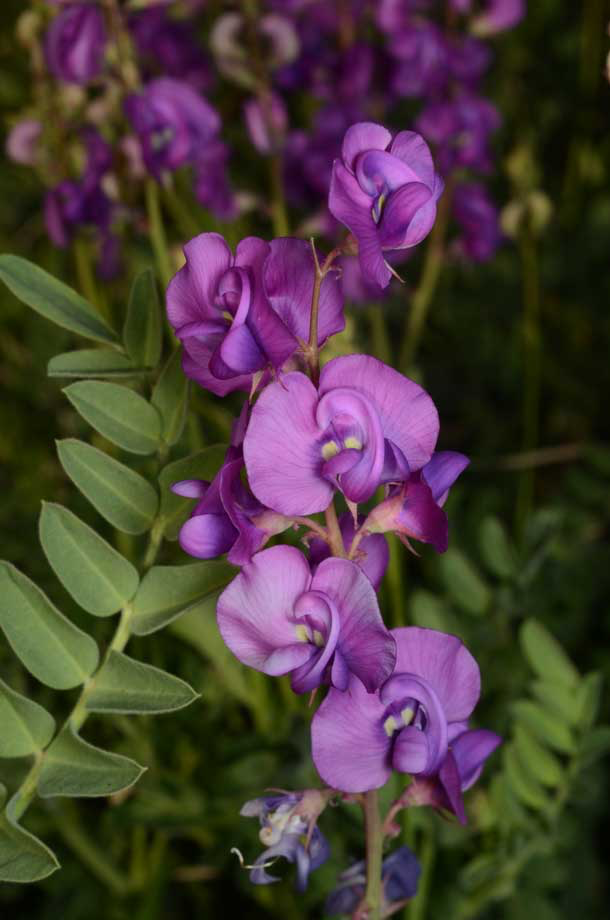

Scientific classification
- Kingdom: Plantae
- Clade: Tracheophytes
- Clade: Angiosperms
- Clade: Eudicots
- Clade: Rosids
- Order: Fabales
- Family: Fabaceae
- Subfamily: Faboideae
- Genus: Swainsona
- Species: S. swainsonioides

Binomial name
- Swainsona swainsonioides (Benth.) A.T.Lee ex J.M.Black

= Swainsona swainsonioides =

Downy Swainson-pea

Species of plant

Swainsona swainsonioides commonly known as downy Swainson-pea or downy Darling pea, is a flowering plant in the family Fabaceae. It is a small perennial herb with purple flowers and grows in eastern states of Australia.

== Description ==
Swainsona swainsonioides is a perennial, spreading herb up to 50 cm (20 in) high with stems covered densely or sparingly with hairs. The leaves are mostly 3–12 cm (1.2–4.7 in) long, leaflets 11-21, narrow to broadly egg-shaped to elliptic, sometimes lance-shaped, 5–20 mm (0.20–0.79 in) long, 4–10 mm (0.16–0.39 in) wide, apex pointed or rounded, upper surface usually smooth, lower surface with short soft hairs. The raceme has 6-15 purple flowers 8–15 mm (0.31–0.59 in) long, pedicel 1.5–4 mm (0.059–0.157 in) long, calyx more or less smooth. Flowering occurs mostly from May to November and the fruit is an elliptic-oblong shaped pod 15–35 mm (0.59–1.38 in) long, apex rounded, smooth, green to brown and containing up to 40 seeds.

== Taxonomy ==
This species was described in 1848 by George Bentham who gave it the name Cyclogyne swainsonioides in Thomas Mitchell's Journal of an Expedition into the Interior of Tropical Australia. In 1948 John McConnell Black transferred the species to the genus Swainsona as S. swainsonioides in the Flora of South Australia, from an unpublished description by Alma Theodora Lee.

== Distribution and habitat ==
Downy Swainson-pea grows on black and heavy red soils in New South Wales, South Australia, Queensland and Victoria.
