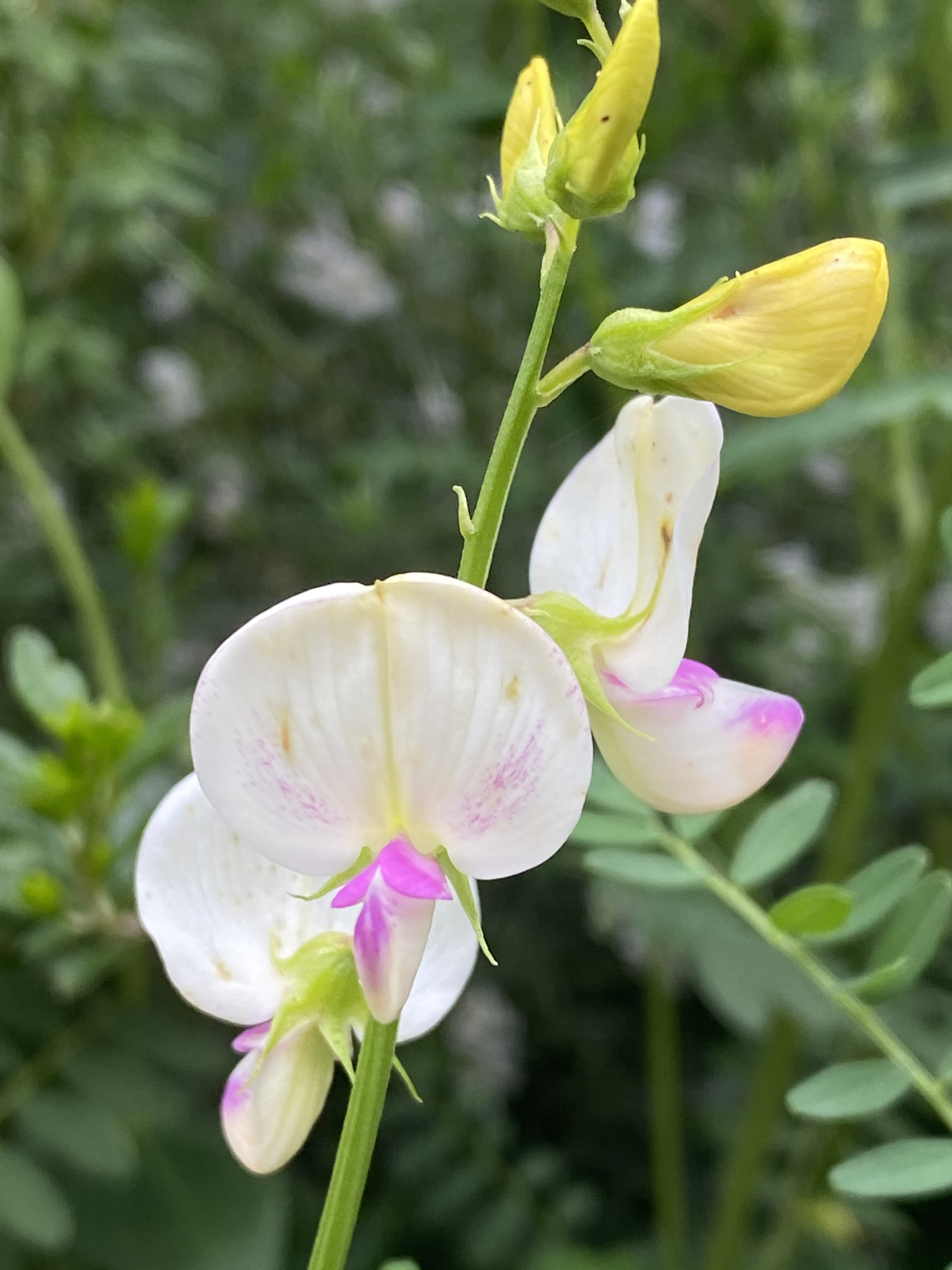

Scientific classification
- Kingdom: Plantae
- Clade: Tracheophytes
- Clade: Angiosperms
- Clade: Eudicots
- Clade: Rosids
- Order: Fabales
- Family: Fabaceae
- Subfamily: Faboideae
- Genus: Swainsona
- Species: S. sejuncta

Binomial name
- Swainsona sejuncta J.Thomps.

= Swainsona sejuncta =

Species of plant

Swainsona sejuncta is a species of flowering plant in the family Fabaceae. It has pea-shaped flowers in a variety of colours, pink, cream, orange and mauve from spring to summer and is endemic to Queensland.

== Description ==
Swainsona sejuncta is a multi-stemmed understory perennial about 1 m (3 ft 3 in) high, 1.5–2 m (4 ft 11 in – 6 ft 7 in) wide and stems slightly angled, mostly 2–3 mm (0.079–0.118 in) wide, smooth, and ribbed. The green leaves are pinnate up to 15 cm (5.9 in) long, 19-31 leaflets, oval-elliptic shaped or narrowly oval, lower leaves smaller, mostly 10–15 mm (0.39–0.59 in) long, 3–5 mm (0.12–0.20 in) wide on a short petiole. The stipule about 3 mm (0.12 in) long, edges thin and dry and almost smooth. The pea-shaped flowers vary in colour, they may be white, orange, yellow, pink or with blotches of pink in racemes 10–15 cm (3.9–5.9 in) long sometimes with 5-10 flowers 15–20 mm (0.59–0.79 in) long on a pedicel up to 5 mm (0.20 in) long and covered in short, soft hairs. The fruit about 30 mm (1.2 in) long, 15 mm (0.59 in) wide, elliptic shaped, swollen, surface initially soft becoming stiff and woody in appearance with age. Flowering usually occurs in spring.

== Taxonomy and naming ==
Swainsona sejuncta was first formally described in 1993 by Joy Thompson and the description was published in the journal Telopea. The specific epithet (sejuncta) means "separated or isolated".

== Distribution and habitat ==
This species has a restricted distribution, found only in central western Queensland in the Carnarvon Range growing in sandy, clay-loans and basalt in eucalypt forests.
