= Swainsona eremaea =

Scientific classification
- Kingdom: Plantae
- Clade: Tracheophytes
- Clade: Angiosperms
- Clade: Eudicots
- Clade: Rosids
- Order: Fabales
- Family: Fabaceae
- Subfamily: Faboideae
- Genus: Swainsona
- Species: S. eremaea

Binomial name
- Swainsona eremaea Joy Thomps.

Species of legume

Swainsona eremaea is a species of flowering plant in the family Fabaceae and is endemic to South Australia. It is a low-growing, spreading, probably perennial plant with imparipinnate leaves with 5 to 11 linear, oblong to broadly wedge-shaped leaflets, and racemes of bright red to brown or yellow flowers in racemes of 5 to 20.

== Description ==
Swainsona eremaea is a low-growing, spreading, probably perennial herb, with initially erect stems. The leaves are imparipinnate, 20–90 mm (0.79–3.54 in) long with 5 to 11 linear, oblong to broadly wedge-shaped, or heart-shaped leaflets with their narrower end towards the base. The leaflets are mostly 1–15 mm (0.039–0.591 in) long and 1–3 mm (0.039–0.118 in) wide with stipules up to 15 mm (0.59 in) long at the base of the petioles. The flowers are bright red, brown or yellow, arranged in racemes of 5 to 20 on a peduncle 1.5–2.5 mm (0.059–0.098 in) wide with broadly lance-shaped to elliptic bracts 1–2 mm (0.039–0.079 in) long at the base. The sepals are joined at the base, forming a tube 2.0–2.5 mm (0.079–0.098 in) long with lobes shorter than or equal to the tube. The standard petal is 9–11 mm (0.35–0.43 in) long and 8–12 mm (0.31–0.47 in) wide, the wings 10–15 mm (0.39–0.59 in) long and the keel 8–9 mm (0.31–0.35 in) long and about 4 mm (0.16 in) deep. The fruit is a narrowly egg-shaped pod 10–15 mm (0.39–0.59 in) long and 3–4 mm (0.12–0.16 in) wide.

== Taxonomy and naming ==
Swainsona eremaea was first formally described in 1993 by Joy Thompson in the journal Telopea, from specimens collected by Frank Badman 10 km (6.2 mi) south of William Creek in 1984. The specific epithet (eremaea) means "from the desert".

== Distribution ==
This species of pea grows in central northern South Australia, in sandy or stony soils on floodplains.
