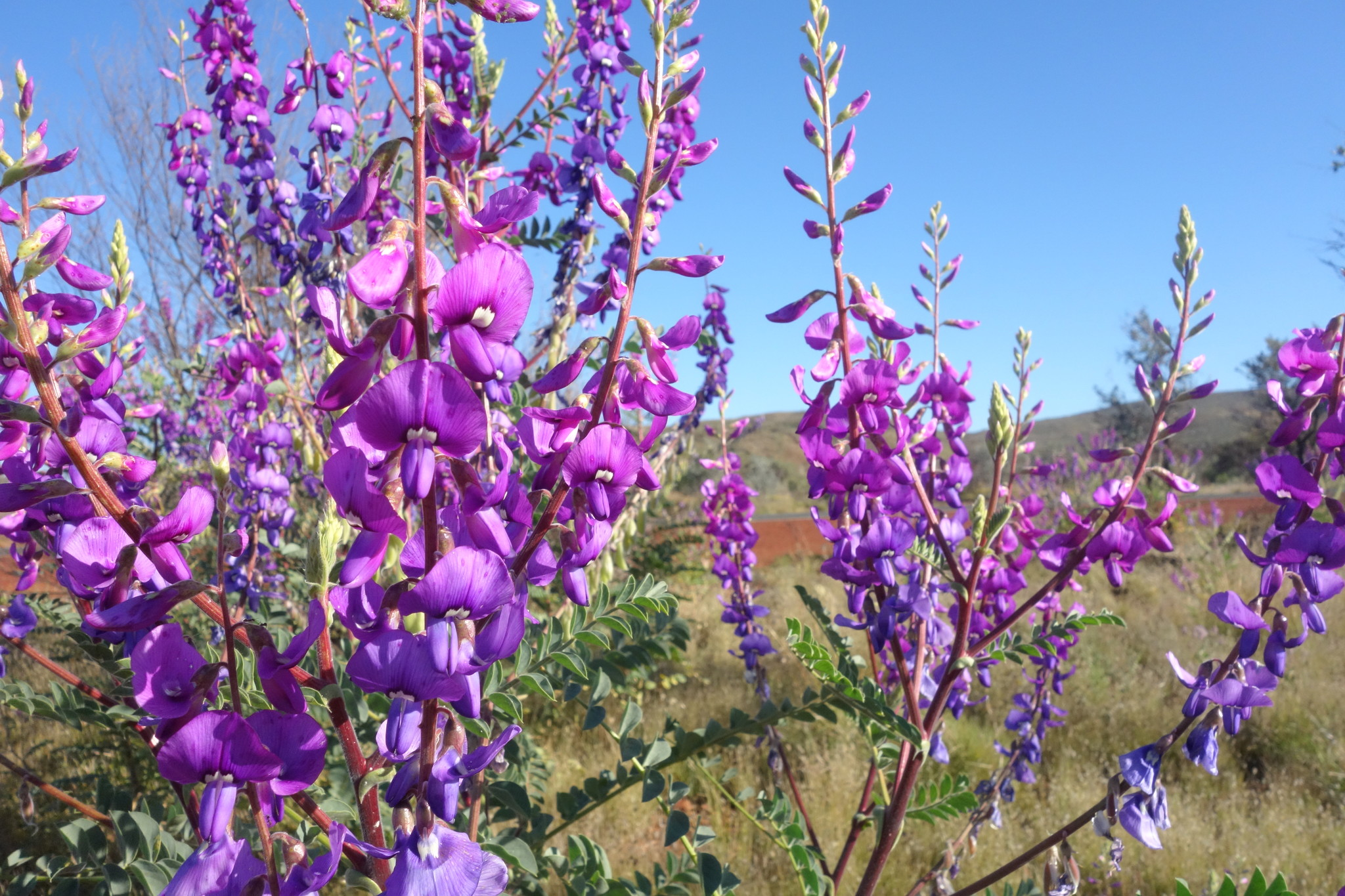

Scientific classification
- Kingdom: Plantae
- Clade: Tracheophytes
- Clade: Angiosperms
- Clade: Eudicots
- Clade: Rosids
- Order: Fabales
- Family: Fabaceae
- Subfamily: Faboideae
- Genus: Swainsona
- Species: S. maccullochiana

Binomial name
- Swainsona maccullochiana Muell.

= Swainsona maccullochiana =

Ashburton pea

Species of plant

Swainsona maccullochiana, commonly known as Ashburton pea, is a species of flowering plant in the family Fabaceae. It is an upright annual with purple-reddish, pink or bluish pea-like flowers from spring to summer and is endemic to Western Australia.

== Description ==
Swainsona maccullochiana is an upright, single-stemmed herbaceous annual to 0.2–3 m (7.9 in – 9 ft 10.1 in) high. The stems are over 10 mm (0.39 in) wide, sturdy, ribbed, needle-shaped, densely covered with fine, spreading hairs up to 2 mm (0.079 in) long that taper to a tip. The leaves up to 20–30 cm (7.9–11.8 in) long with 15-31 broadly egg-shaped to oval-shaped leaflets usually 20–30 mm (0.79–1.18 in) long, 10–20 mm (0.39–0.79 in) wide, apex usually pointed, occasionally rounded or notched. The 20-40 purplish-reddish, pink or bluish or sometimes white pea-like flowers are borne in racemes of differing age on a peduncle over 5 mm (0.20 in) wide, pedicels about 4 mm (0.16 in) long. The standard petal about 30 mm (1.2 in) long, 20–25 mm (0.79–0.98 in) wide, the wings about 25 mm (0.98 in) long and the keel 6 mm (0.24 in) deep. Flowering occurs from July to October and the fruit 30–35 mm (1.2–1.4 in) long, over 10 mm (0.39 in) wide and elliptic-shaped.

== Taxonomy and naming ==
Swainsona maccullochiana was first formally described in 1869 by Ferdinand von Mueller and the description was published in Fragmenta Phytographiae Australiae. The specific epithet (maccullochiana) is in honour of James McCutcheon.

== Distribution and habitat ==
Ashburton pea grows in moist, low lying areas near watercourses on loam in central Western Australia.
