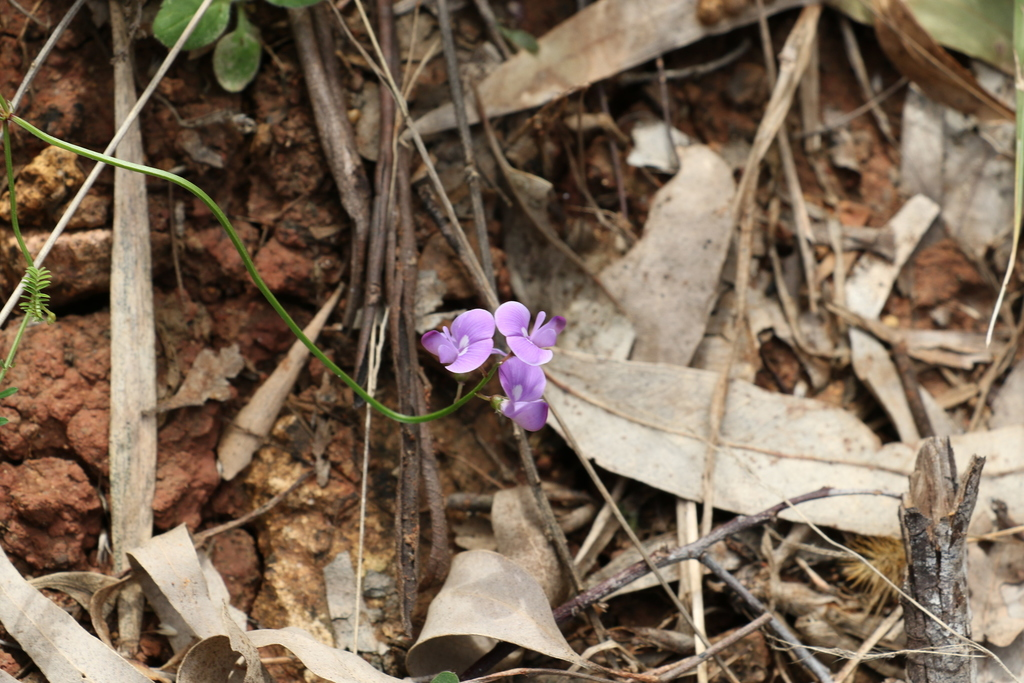
- Near Moogerah, Queensland

Scientific classification
- Kingdom: Plantae
- Clade: Tracheophytes
- Clade: Angiosperms
- Clade: Eudicots
- Clade: Rosids
- Order: Fabales
- Family: Fabaceae
- Subfamily: Faboideae
- Genus: Swainsona
- Species: S. brachycarpa

Binomial name
- Swainsona brachycarpa Benth.

Synonyms
- Swainsonia brachycarpa Benth.

= Swainsona brachycarpa =

Species of plant

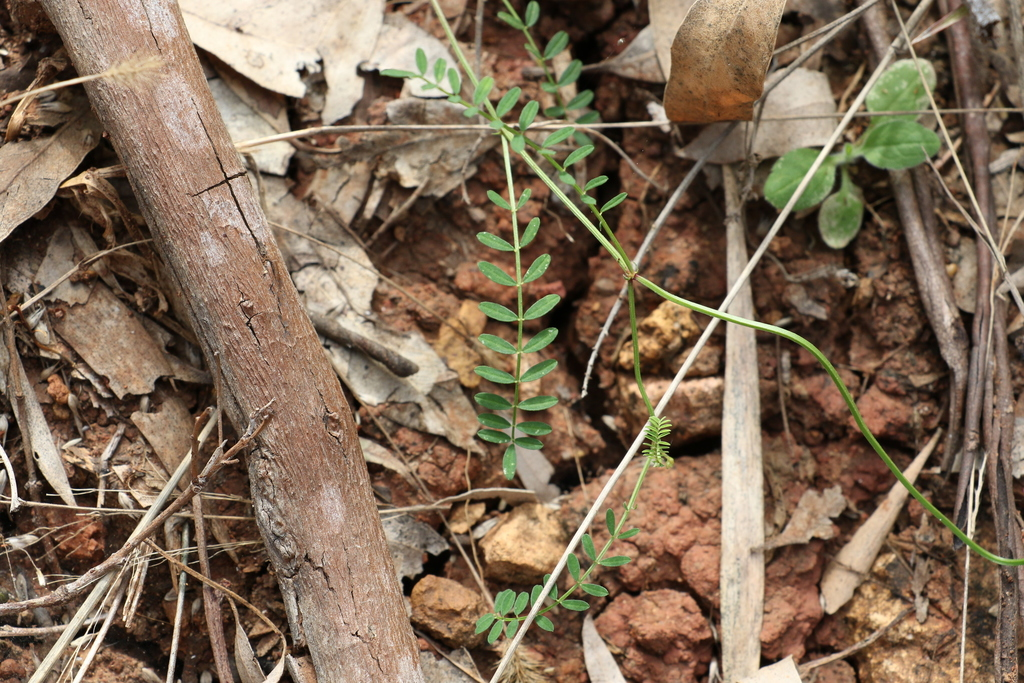
Leaves

Swainsona brachycarpa, commonly known as slender swainson-pea, is a species of flowering plant in the family Fabaceae and is endemic to eastern Australia. It is a prostrate or ascending perennial herb with imparipinnate leaves usually with 9 to 13 egg-shaped to narrowly elliptic or egg-shaped leaflets, and racemes of up to 12 white, purple or dark red flowers.

== Description ==
Swainsona brachycarpa is a prostrate or ascending herb, that typically grows to a height of less than 10 cm (3.9 in) with many slender stems arising from its base. Its leaves are imparipinnate, 2–10 mm (0.079–0.394 in) long with stipules 1 mm (0.039 in) long at the base. There are 9 to 13 egg-shaped to narrowly elliptic or egg-shaped leaflets, mostly 9–23 mm (0.35–0.91 in) and 1–4 mm (0.039–0.157 in) wide. The flowers are arranged in racemes 1–20 mm (0.039–0.787 in) long of up to 12, usually only up to 2 flowers open at any one times, on a peduncle up to 0.5–15 mm (0.020–0.591 in) in diameter, each flower 6–18 mm (0.24–0.71 in) long. The sepals are softly-hairy and joined at the base, forming a tube 1.5–2.5 mm (0.059–0.098 in) long, the sepal lobes shorther than the sepal tube. The petals are white, purple or dark red, the standard petal about 10 mm (0.39 in) long, the wings 7–8 mm (0.28–0.31 in) long, and the keel mostly 6–9 mm (0.24–0.35 in) long. The fruit is usually an elliptic pod 15–30 mm (0.59–1.18 in) long and 5–10 mm (0.20–0.39 in) wide with the remains of the style 3 mm (0.12 in) long.

== Taxonomy and naming ==
Swainsona brachycarpa was first formally described in 1864 by George Bentham in Flora Australiensis.

== Distribution and habitat ==
Slender swainson-pea grows in grassland and woodland in rocky sites and loamy soil in from south-east Queensland to the coast and tableland of northern New South Wales. It is rare in Victoria where it is apparently confined to the north east Grampians.

== Conservation status ==
Swainsona brachycarpa is listed as "endangered" under the Victorian Government Flora and Fauna Guarantee Act 1988.
