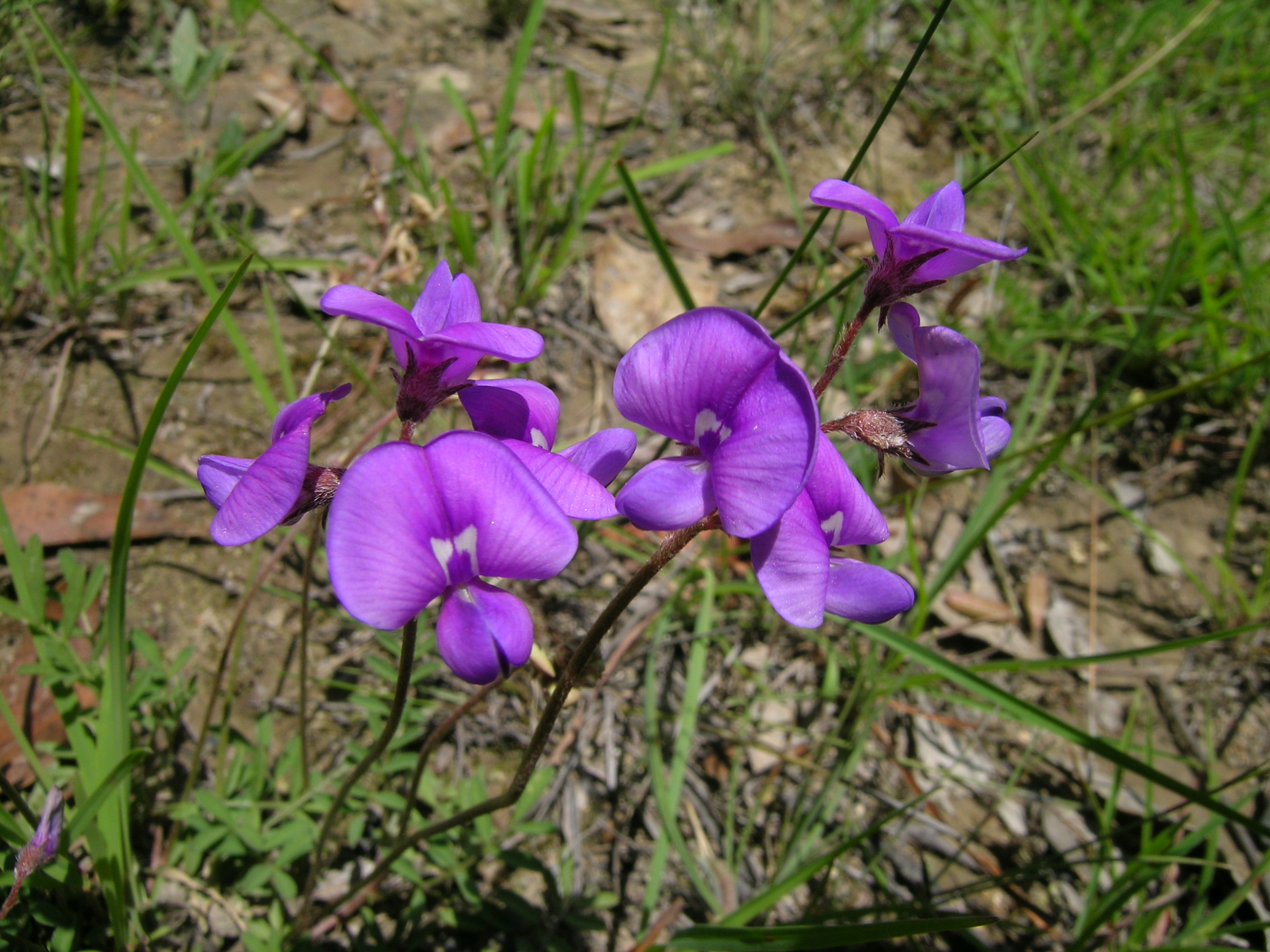

Scientific classification
- Kingdom: Plantae
- Clade: Tracheophytes
- Clade: Angiosperms
- Clade: Eudicots
- Clade: Rosids
- Order: Fabales
- Family: Fabaceae
- Subfamily: Faboideae
- Genus: Swainsona
- Species: S. monticola

Binomial name
- Swainsona monticola A.Cunn. ex Benth.

= Swainsona monticola =

Notched Swainson-pea

Species of plant

Swainsona monticola, commonly known as notched Swainson-pea, is a flowering plant in the pea family Fabaceae and grows in New South Wales and the Australian Capital Territory. It is an upright or sprawling perennial with fern-like leaves and purple pea flowers.

== Description ==
Swainsona monticola is a low growing, perennial plant and stems with short, slightly flattened hairs. The leaves are 5–10 cm (2.0–3.9 in) long with 11 to 25 narrowly egg-shaped, oblong or elliptic-shaped leaflets 2–15 mm (0.079–0.591 in) long, 3 mm (0.12 in) wide, rounded or notched at the apex and the lower surface with occasional hairs. The 3-15 pea-shaped flowers are borne on upright stems in a raceme, 4–7 mm (0.16–0.28 in) long, corolla purple with two small white spots on the standard petal and the pedicel 5 mm (0.20 in) long. Flowering occurs from October to February and the fruit is oblong-oval shaped, up to 1.5 cm (0.59 in) long, 8–15 mm (0.31–0.59 in) long and more or less smooth.

== Taxonomy and naming ==
Swainsona monticola was formally described 1864 by George Bentham from an unpublished description by Allan Cunningham and published in Flora Australiensis. The specific epithet (monticola) is derived from the Latin mons, meaning "mountain" and cola, meaning "dweller", referring to the montane habitat.

== Distribution and habitat ==
Notched Swainson-pea grows at higher altitudes on woodland or rocky slopes in New South Wales and the Australian Capital Territory.
