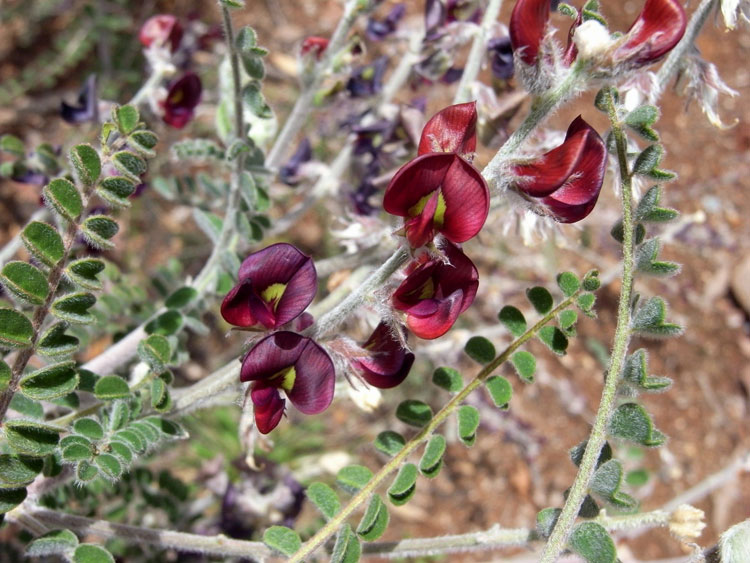

Scientific classification
- Kingdom: Plantae
- Clade: Tracheophytes
- Clade: Angiosperms
- Clade: Eudicots
- Clade: Rosids
- Order: Fabales
- Family: Fabaceae
- Subfamily: Faboideae
- Genus: Swainsona
- Species: S. burkittii

Binomial name
- Swainsona burkittii F.Muell. ex Benth.

Synonyms
- Swainsonia burkittii F.Muell. orth. var.

= Swainsona burkittii =

Species of plant endemic to Australia

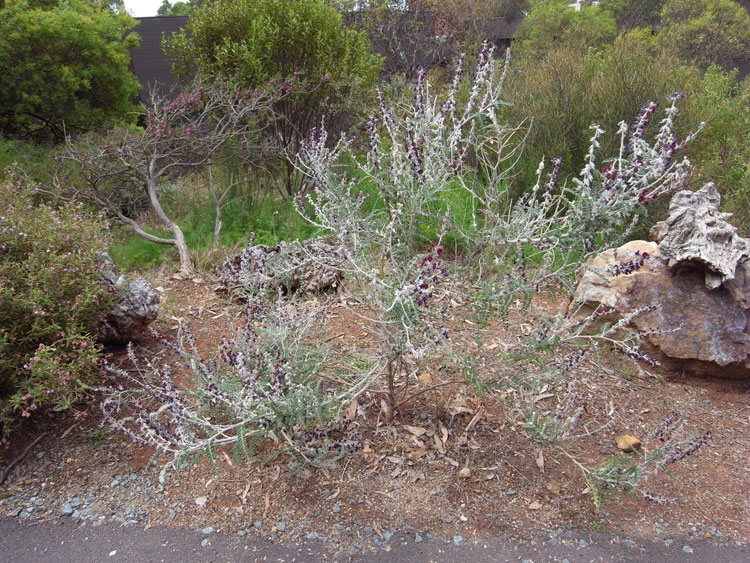
Habit in the Australian National Botanic Gardens

Swainsona burkittii, commonly known as woolly Darling pea, is a species of flowering plant in the family Fabaceae and is endemic to inland Australia. It is an erect or low-lying perennial with imparipinnate leaves usually with 15 to 30 egg-shaped to more or less circular leaflets, and racemes of up to fifty dark reddish-purple flowers.

== Description ==
Swainsona burkittii is an erect or low-lying perennial subshrub that typically grows to a height of 1 m (3 ft 3 in) with its stems densely covered with soft hairs. Its leaves are imparipinnate, 8–15 cm (3.1–5.9 in) long with stipules 3–6 mm (0.12–0.24 in) long at the base. There are 15 to 30 oblong leaflets with the narrower end towards the base, sometimes more or less circular, 2–15 mm (0.079–0.591 in) and 2–10 mm (0.079–0.394 in) wide. Both sides of the leaflets are covered with soft hairs. The flowers are arranged in racemes 8–10 mm (0.31–0.39 in) long of up to 50, each flower on a pedicel about 2 mm (0.079 in) long. The sepals are 5–7 mm (0.20–0.28 in) long and joined at the base, the sepal lobes narrowly triangular and longer than the sepal tube. The petals are dark reddish-purple, the standard petal is 8–11 mm (0.31–0.43 in) long, the wings are oblong 5–8 mm (0.20–0.31 in) long, and the keel 7–10 mm (0.28–0.39 in) long on a claw up to 3 mm (0.12 in) long. The fruit is a more or less spherical pod 7–8 mm (0.28–0.31 in) long and about 5 mm (0.20 in) wide and woolly-hairy.

== Taxonomy and naming ==
Swainsona burkittii was first formally described in 1864 by George Bentham in Flora Australiensis from an unpublished description of Ferdinand von Mueller. Bentham's description was published in his Flora Australiensis. The specific epithet (burkittii) honours J. Burkitt, who collected for von Mueller.

== Distribution and habitat ==
This species of swainsona grows in shrubland and sparse woodland in the far west of New South Wales and the Flinders Ranges and Eyre Peninsula of South Australia.
