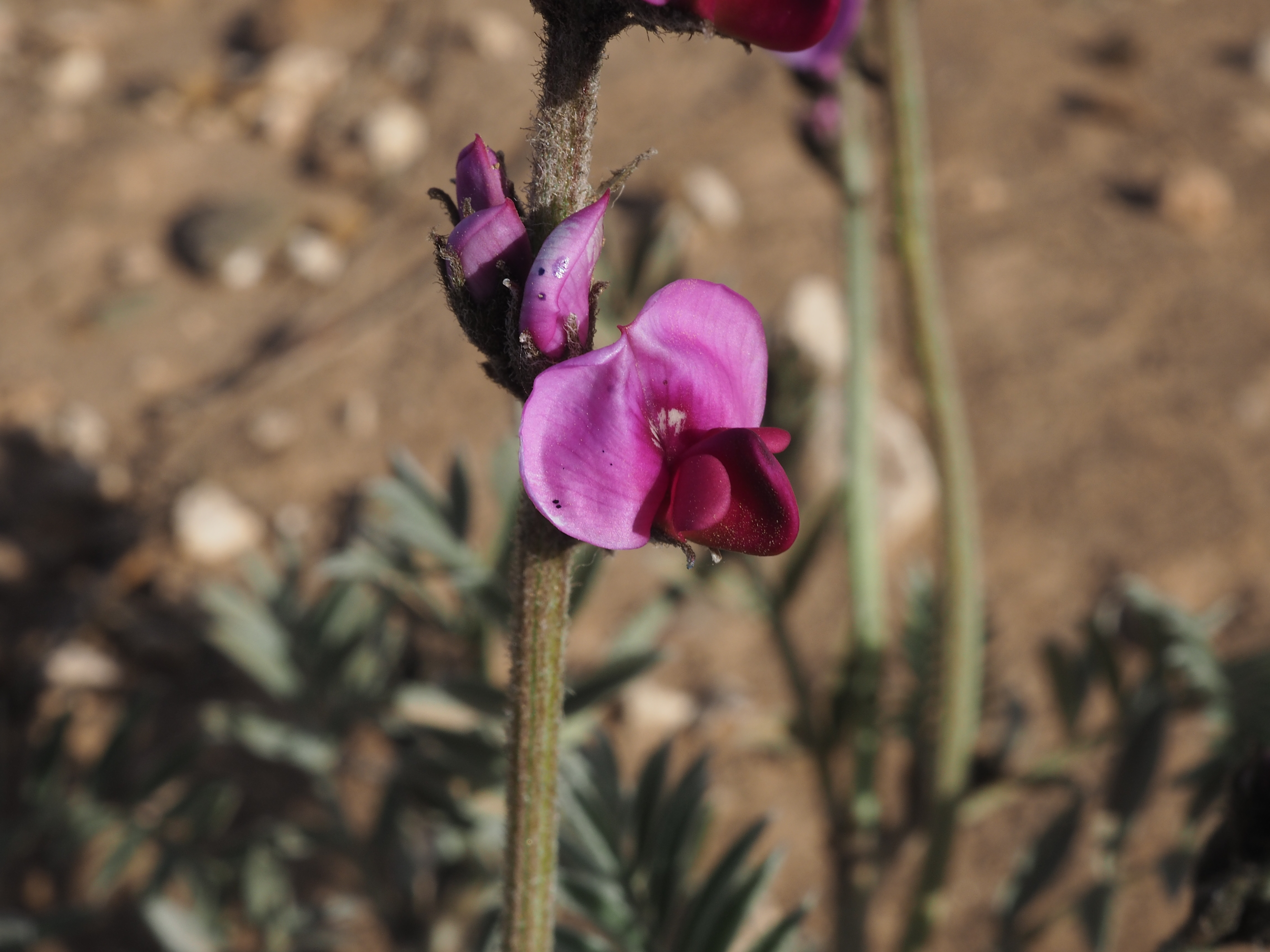

Scientific classification
- Kingdom: Plantae
- Clade: Tracheophytes
- Clade: Angiosperms
- Clade: Eudicots
- Clade: Rosids
- Order: Fabales
- Family: Fabaceae
- Subfamily: Faboideae
- Genus: Swainsona
- Species: S. tephrotricha

Binomial name
- Swainsona tephrotricha F.Muell.

Synonyms
- Swainsona lessertiifolia var. tephrotricha (F.Muell.) Benth.

= Swainsona tephrotricha =

Species of flowering plant

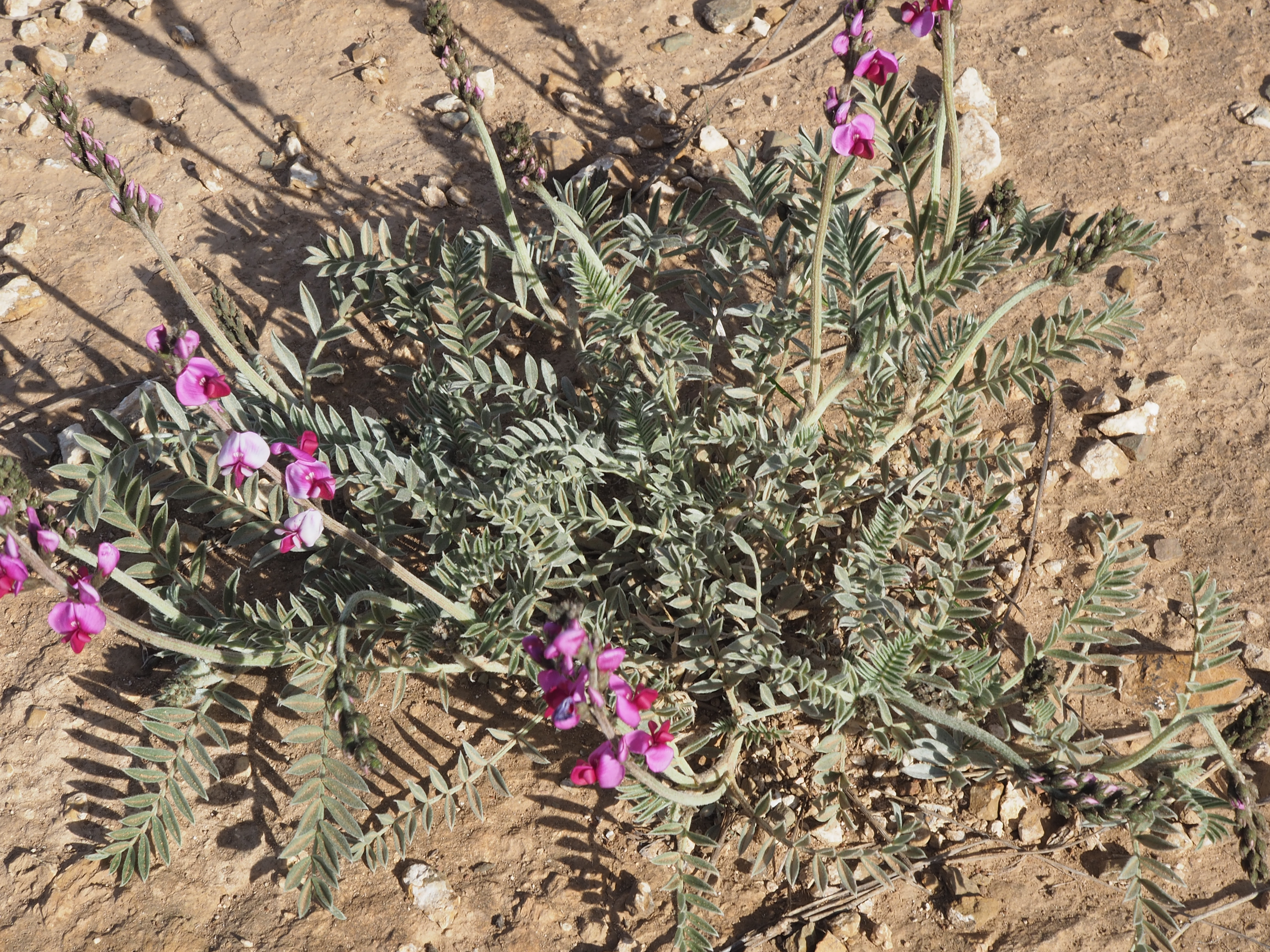
On Mount Bryan

Swainsona tephrotricha is a species of flowering plant in the family Fabaceae and is endemic to eastern South Australia. It is an erect or ascending perennial plant, with imparipinnate leaves with 7 to 19 broadly egg-shaped to narrowly elliptic leaflets, and racemes of 30 or more pink or pinkish-purple flowers.

== Description ==
Swainsona tephrotricha is an erect or ascending subshrubby perennial, with imparipinnate leaves 50–100 mm (2.0–3.9 in) long, with 7 to 19 broadly egg-shaped to narrowly elliptic leaflets, 30–90 mm (1.2–3.5 in) long, the side leaflets 10–30 mm (0.39–1.18 in) long and 3–10 mm (0.12–0.39 in) wide. There is a stipule 5–8 mm (0.20–0.31 in) long at the base of the petiole. The flowers are arranged in racemes with up to 30 or more flowers on a peduncle 2–3 mm (0.079–0.118 in) wide, each flower 8–12 mm (0.31–0.47 in) long on a dark, hairy pedicel 1–3 mm (0.039–0.118 in) long. The sepals are joined at the base, forming a tube 2–3 mm (0.079–0.118 in) long, the sepal lobes usually much shorter than the tube. The petals are pink or pinkish-purple, rarely white, the standard petal 8–12 mm (0.31–0.47 in) long and 10–12 mm (0.39–0.47 in) wide, the wings about 8–10 mm (0.31–0.39 in) long, and the keel about 9–10 mm (0.35–0.39 in) long and 3.5–4.0 mm (0.14–0.16 in) deep. Flowering mainly occurs from July to October and the fruit is more or less spherical, 10–15 mm (0.39–0.59 in) long and 7–8 mm (0.28–0.31 in) wide, with the remains of the style about 6 mm (0.24 in) long.

== Taxonomy ==
Swainsona tephrotricha was first formally described in 1853 by Ferdinand von Mueller in the journal Linnaea.

== Distribution and habitat ==
This species of pea grows on arid hillsides, often on roadsides, in and around the Flinders Ranges in the east of South Australia.
