= Swainsona fraseri =

Scientific classification
- Kingdom: Plantae
- Clade: Tracheophytes
- Clade: Angiosperms
- Clade: Eudicots
- Clade: Rosids
- Order: Fabales
- Family: Fabaceae
- Subfamily: Faboideae
- Genus: Swainsona
- Species: S. fraseri

Binomial name
- Swainsona fraseri Benth.

Synonyms
- Swainsona colutoides var. fraseri (Benth.) F.Muell.; Swainsonia fraseri F.Muell. orth. var.

Species of legume

Swainsona fraseri is a species of flowering plant in the family Fabaceae and is endemic to eastern Australia. It is a perennial plant with imparipinnate leaves with mostly 21 to 24 ellipitic leaflets, and racemes of 20 or more pink to purple flowers.

== Description ==
Swainsona fraseri is a perennial subshrub, that typically grows to a height of 1.5 m (4 ft 11 in) or more, and has sparsely hairy stems. The leaves are imparipinnate, mostly 50–100 mm (2.0–3.9 in) long with 21 to 24 elliptic leaflets, 5–15 mm (0.20–0.59 in) long and 3–6 mm (0.12–0.24 in) wide with variably shaped stipules up to 5 mm (0.20 in) long at the base of the petioles. The flowers are pink or purple, arranged in racemes of often 20 or more and up to 150 mm (5.9 in) or even 300 mm (12 in) long, on a peduncle 0.5–2 mm (0.020–0.079 in) long, each flower on a pedicel 3–7 mm (0.12–0.28 in) long. The sepals are joined at the base to form a tube, with teeth shorter than the tube. The standard petal is about 10–12 mm (0.39–0.47 in) long and broad, the wings 7–9 mm (0.28–0.35 in) long and the keel about 9–12 mm (0.35–0.47 in) long and 5–6 mm (0.20–0.24 in) deep. The fruit is an elliptic pod 30–40 mm (1.2–1.6 in) long and 10–13 mm (0.39–0.51 in) wide on a stalk 2–3 mm (0.079–0.118 in) long, with the remains of a down-turned or curved style.

== Taxonomy and naming ==
Swainsona fraseri was first formally described in 1864 by George Bentham in his Flora Australiensis.

== Distribution ==
This species of pea grows in sheltered sites in open forest in south-eastern Queensland and the north coast of New South Wales.
