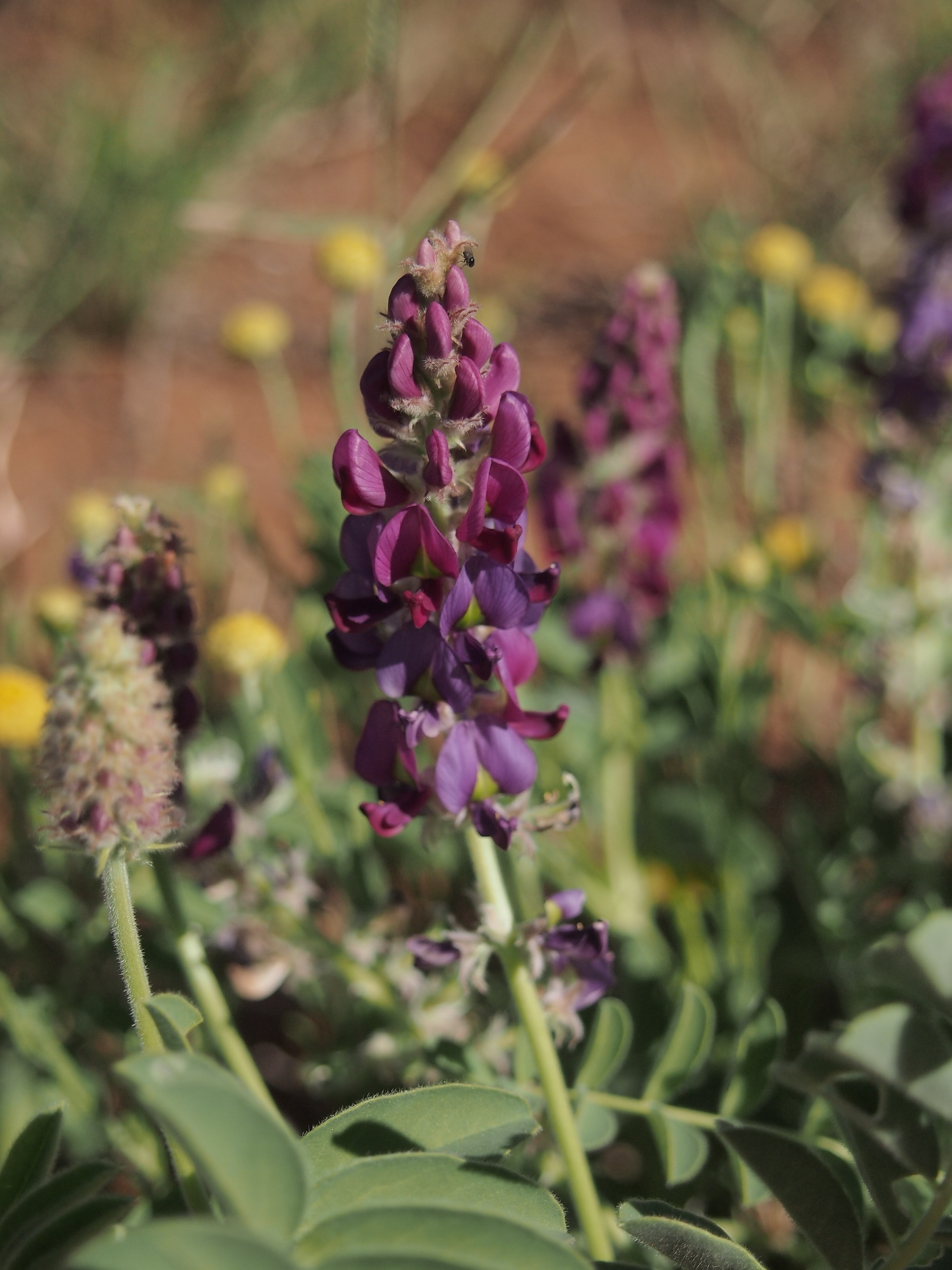

Scientific classification
- Kingdom: Plantae
- Clade: Tracheophytes
- Clade: Angiosperms
- Clade: Eudicots
- Clade: Rosids
- Order: Fabales
- Family: Fabaceae
- Subfamily: Faboideae
- Genus: Swainsona
- Species: S. canescens

Binomial name
- Swainsona canescens (Benth. ex Lindl.) F.Muell

= Swainsona canescens =

Grey swainsona

Species of plant

Swainsona canescens, commonly known as grey swainsona, is a flowering plant in the family Fabaceae. It is a small perennial herb with pink-purple or purple, yellow and green flowers and grows in Queensland, Western Australia and South Australia.

== Description ==
Swainsona canescens is an ascending or upright perennial herb with stiff stems over 20 cm (7.9 in) long and more than 3 mm (0.12 in) wide near the base. The leaves are 5–12 cm (2.0–4.7 in) long, usually with 10-13 egg-shaped or broadly elliptic to oblong leaflets, 10–20 mm (0.39–0.79 in) long, 5–15 mm (0.20–0.59 in) wide, almost smooth on upper surface or with silky hairs on both surfaces and occasionally with a triangular, short point or slight notch. The 20-35 flowers are 8–9 mm (0.31–0.35 in) long borne on a raceme, peduncle strong and 10–20 cm (3.9–7.9 in) long. The bracts are triangular-shaped up to 5 mm (0.20 in) long, smooth on the inside and tapering to a point. The calyx is white, woolly to covered in silky, soft, straight hairs. The petals mostly purple, sometimes pinkish-purple or yellow and green, standard petal broadly egg-shaped, finely notched, wings oblong-shaped and the keel semi-circular. Flowering occurs in May or July to December and the fruit is a pod 10–15 cm (3.9–5.9 in) long and about 4 mm (0.16 in) wide, densely covered in short, matted hairs and containing up to 10 seeds.

== Taxonomy and naming ==
This species was described in 1839 by John Lindley, who gave it the name Cyclogyne canescens in A Sketch of the Vegetation of the Swan River Colony, from an unpublished description by George Bentham. In 1862 Ferdinand von Mueller changed the name to Swainsona canescens and the description was published in Fragmenta Phytographiae Australiae.

== Distribution and habitat ==
Swainsona canescens usually grows on red sandy soils in Queensland, South Australia, Western Australia and the Northern Territory.
