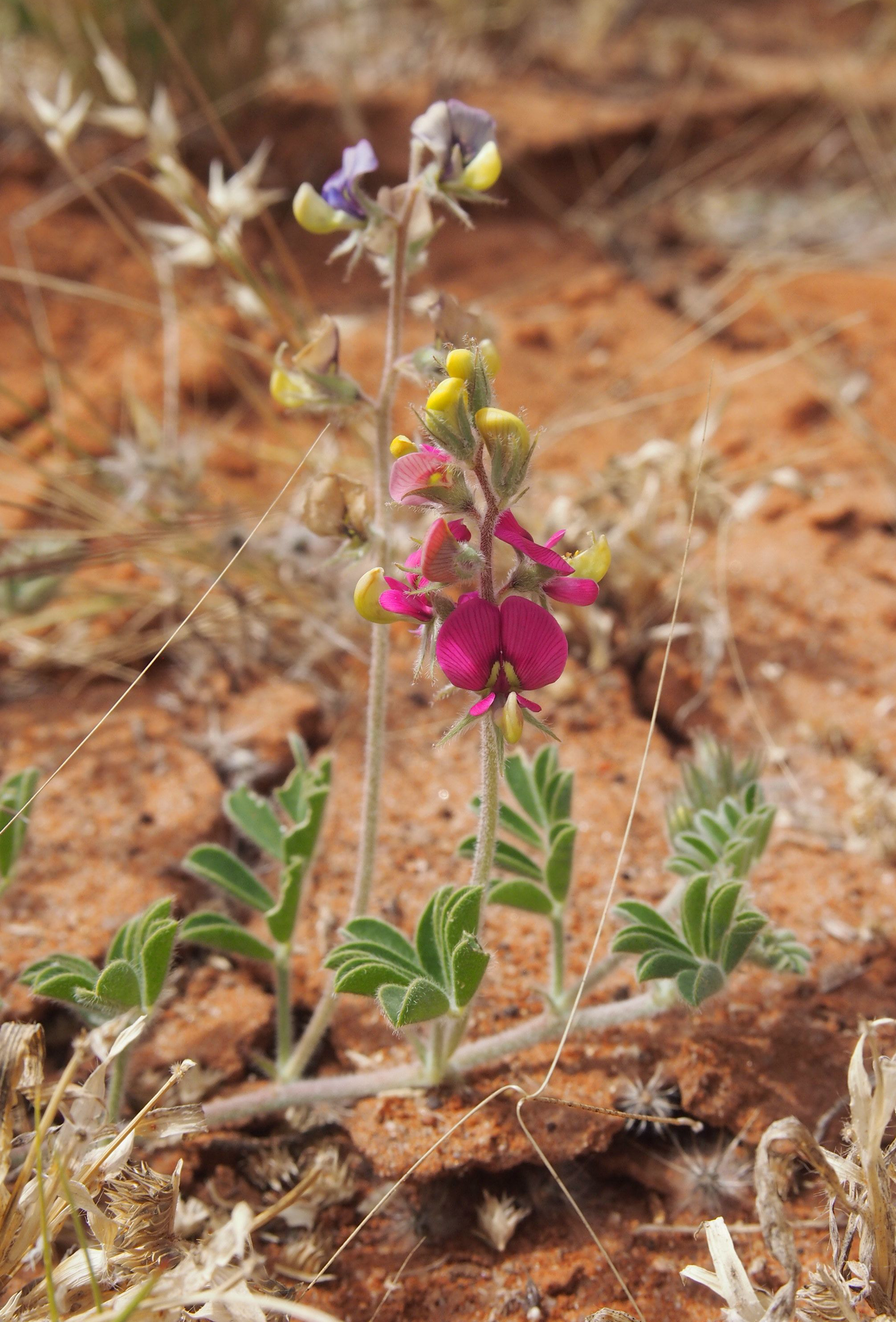

Scientific classification
- Kingdom: Plantae
- Clade: Tracheophytes
- Clade: Angiosperms
- Clade: Eudicots
- Clade: Rosids
- Order: Fabales
- Family: Fabaceae
- Subfamily: Faboideae
- Genus: Swainsona
- Species: S. flavicarinata

Binomial name
- Swainsona flavicarinata J.M.Black

= Swainsona flavicarinata =

Species of legume

Swainsona flavicarinata is a species of flowering plant in the family Fabaceae and is endemic to inland areas of continental Australia. It is a prostrate to more or less erect perennial herb, with imparipinnate leaves with 5 to 9 egg-shaped leaflets with the narrower end towards the base, and racemes of 3 to 15 purple, red or pink flowers.

== Description ==
Swainsona flavicarinata is a prostrate to more or less erect perennial herb, that typically grows to a height of about 45 cm (18 in) and has densely softly-hairy stems. The leaves are imparipinnate, mostly 20–60 mm (0.79–2.36 in) long with 5 to 9 egg-shaped leaflets with the narrower end towards the base, the leaflets 10–15 mm (0.39–0.59 in) long and 5–10 mm (0.20–0.39 in) wide with lance-shaped stipules 4–7 mm (0.16–0.28 in) long at the base of the petioles. The flowers are purple, red or pink, arranged in racemes of 3 to 15, each flower 5–10 mm (0.20–0.39 in) long on a pedicel 3–4 mm (0.12–0.16 in) long. The sepals are softly-hairy, joined at the base to form a tube, with teeth 3 or more times longer than the tube. The standard petal is 8.5–11 mm (0.33–0.43 in) long, the wings 7.2–9.6 mm (0.28–0.38 in) long and the keel 8–10.5 mm (0.31–0.41 in) long. Flowering usually occurs from June to October, and the fruit is an oval to oblong pod 10–15 mm (0.39–0.59 in) long on a very short stalk, with the remains of the style about 4 mm (0.16 in) long.

== Taxonomy and naming ==
Swainsona flavicarinata was first formally described in 1924 by John McConnell Black in the Flora of South Australia. The specific epithet (flavicarinata) means "yellow-keeled".

== Distribution and habitat ==
This species of pea usually grows near watercourses or floodplains near creeks or rocks holes in inland Australia, mostly in the Northern Territory, but there are also records from South Australia, Queensland and New South Wales.
