= Swainsona perlonga =

Scientific classification
- Kingdom: Plantae
- Clade: Tracheophytes
- Clade: Angiosperms
- Clade: Eudicots
- Clade: Rosids
- Order: Fabales
- Family: Fabaceae
- Subfamily: Faboideae
- Genus: Swainsona
- Species: S. perlonga

Binomial name
- Swainsona perlonga Joy Thomps.

Species of plant

Swainsona perlonga is a species of flowering plant in the family Fabaceae and is endemic to inland parts of the south-west of Western Australia. It is a scrambling perennial herb with imparipinnate leaves with 7 to 13 egg-shaped or almost round leaflets, and racemes of 7 to 10 purple to lilac-pink flowers.

== Description ==
Swainsona perlonga is scrambling perennial herb that typically grows to a height of up to about 1 m (3 ft 3 in). Its leaves are imparipinnate, 30–60 mm (1.2–2.4 in) long on a petiole, with 7 to 13, egg-shaped to almost round leaflets, the lower leaflets 3–12 mm (0.12–0.47 in) long and 4–6 mm (0.16–0.24 in) wide. There is an egg-shaped stipule 1–7 mm (0.039–0.276 in) long at the base of the petiole. The flowers are arranged in racemes with 7 to 10 flowers on a peduncle about 1 mm (0.039 in) wide, each flower about 10 mm (0.39 in) long on a pedicel about 2 mm (0.079 in) long. The sepals are joined at the base, forming a tube 2.0–2.5 mm (0.079–0.098 in) long, the sepal lobes about as long as the tube. The petals are purple to lilac-pink, the standard petal about 10 mm (0.39 in) long and wide, the wings about 9 mm (0.35 in) long, and the keel about 10 mm (0.39 in) long and 5 mm (0.20 in) long and 4–5 mm (0.16–0.20 in) deep. Flowering occurs in August, and the fruit is 15–20 mm (0.59–0.79 in) long and 3–6 mm (0.12–0.24 in) wide.

== Taxonomy and naming ==
Swainsona perlonga was first formally described in 1993 by Joy Thompson in the journal Telopea from specimens collected by Charles Gardner in 1953. The specific epithet (perlonga) means "very long", referring to its location, very far from that if the similar S. viridis.

== Distribution and habitat ==
This species of pea grows in clay on river banks, and swampy or saline areas, in the Geraldton Sandplains, Murchison and Yalgoo bioregions of inland, south-western Western Australia.
