= Swainsona acuticarinata =

Scientific classification
- Kingdom: Plantae
- Clade: Tracheophytes
- Clade: Angiosperms
- Clade: Eudicots
- Clade: Rosids
- Order: Fabales
- Family: Fabaceae
- Subfamily: Faboideae
- Genus: Swainsona
- Species: S. acuticarinata

Binomial name
- Swainsona acuticarinata (A.T.Lee) Joy Thomps.

Synonyms
- Swainsona burkei subsp. acuticarinata A.T.Lee

Species of legume

Swainsona acuticarinata is a species of flowering plant in the family Fabaceae and is endemic to arid areas of central Australia. It is a prostrate perennial herb with imparipinnate leaves with 5 to 11 leaflets, and racemes of purple flowers.

== Description ==
Swainsona acuticarinata is a prostrate perennial herb, that typically grows to a height of up to 45 cm (18 in) with several densely softly-hairy stems at the base. The leaves are imparipinnate, 10–50 mm (0.39–1.97 in) long with 5 to 11 egg-shaped leaflets, the leaflets 5–15 mm (0.20–0.59 in) long and 3–7 mm (0.12–0.28 in) wide. The flowers are purple, arranged in racemes 10–150 mm (0.39–5.91 in) long of 2 to 10, each flower 7–10 mm (0.28–0.39 in) long on a pedicel about 2 mm (0.079 in) long with lance-shaped bracts 2–3 mm (0.079–0.118 in) long at the base. The sepals are joined at the base, forming a tube about 1.5 mm (0.059 in) long, the lobes 3 or 4 times longer than the sepal tube. The standard petal is 7–11 mm (0.28–0.43 in) long, 8–10 mm (0.31–0.39 in) wide, the wings 4.5–7 mm (0.18–0.28 in) long, and the keel 6–10 mm (0.24–0.39 in) long and 3–4 mm (0.12–0.16 in) deep. Flowering occurs in most months, and the fruit is an oblong pod 10–15 mm (0.39–0.59 in) long and about 4–5 mm (0.16–0.20 in) wide.

== Taxonomy and naming ==
This species was first formally described in 1948 by Alma Theodora Lee who gave it the name Swainsona burkei subsp. acuticarinata in Contributions from the New South Wales National Herbarium. In 1993 Joy Thompson raised it to species status as S. acuticarinata in the journal Telopea. The specific epithet (acuticarinata) means "sharp-pointed keel".

== Distribution and habitat ==
Swainsona acuticarinata grows with Triodia species, often in scattered mallee or mulga, and occurs in the south-west of the Northern Territory, western South Australia and in scattered parts of eastern Western Australia.
