= Swainsona rostrata =

Scientific classification
- Kingdom: Plantae
- Clade: Tracheophytes
- Clade: Angiosperms
- Clade: Eudicots
- Clade: Rosids
- Order: Fabales
- Family: Fabaceae
- Subfamily: Faboideae
- Genus: Swainsona
- Species: S. rostrata

Binomial name
- Swainsona rostrata Joy Thomps.

Species of plant

Swainsona rostrata is a species of flowering plant in the family Fabaceae and is endemic to Central Australia. It is a prostrate or low-growing annual or perennial plant with imparipinnate leaves with 7 to 9 egg-shaped leaflets with the narrower end towards the base, and racemes of usually up to 5 purple or cream-coloured flowers.

== Description ==
Swainsona rostrata is prostrate or low-growing annual or perennial plant that typically grows to a height of up to about 10 cm (3.9 in). Its leaves are imparipinnate, mostly 10–40 mm (0.39–1.57 in) long on a variably-sized petiole, with 7 to 9 egg-shaped leaflets with the narrower end towards the base, the side leaflets mostly 3–10 mm (0.12–0.39 in) long and 2–6 mm (0.079–0.236 in) wide. There is a stipule 1.5–4 mm (0.059–0.157 in) long at the base of the petiole. The flowers are arranged in racemes 30–120 mm (1.2–4.7 in) long with up to 5 flowers on a peduncle up to 1 mm (0.039 in) wide, each flower about 8 mm (0.31 in) long on a pedicel about 2 mm (0.079 in) long. The sepals are joined at the base, forming a tube about 1.5 mm (0.059 in) long, the sepal lobes usually twice, to three times as long as the tube. The petals are purple and/or cream-coloured, the standard petal 8–10 mm (0.31–0.39 in) long and 9–12 mm (0.35–0.47 in) wide, the wings about 5–7 mm (0.20–0.28 in) long, and the keel about 8–9 mm (0.31–0.35 in) long and 3–4 mm (0.12–0.16 in) deep. The fruit is 15–20 mm (0.59–0.79 in) long and 3–5 mm (0.12–0.20 in) wide.

== Taxonomy and naming ==
Swainsona rostrata was first formally described in 1993 by Joy Thompson in the journal Telopea from specimens collected on the Burt Plain by Desmond Nelson in 1962. The specific epithet (rostrata) means "beaked", referring to the shape of the keel.

== Distribution and habitat ==
This species of pea grows in heavy red soil on stony plains, mainly in the south of the Northern Territory, with some occurrences in adjacent areas of South Australia.
