= Swainsona fuscoviridis =

Scientific classification
- Kingdom: Plantae
- Clade: Tracheophytes
- Clade: Angiosperms
- Clade: Eudicots
- Clade: Rosids
- Order: Fabales
- Family: Fabaceae
- Subfamily: Faboideae
- Genus: Swainsona
- Species: S. fuscoviridis

Binomial name
- Swainsona fuscoviridis Joy Thomps.

Species of legume

Swainsona fuscoviridis is a species of flowering plant in the family Fabaceae and is endemic to South Australia. It is a perennial plant with many stems and imparipinnate leaves with mostly 7 or 9 ellipitic, linear or egg-shaped or lance-shaped leaflets, and racemes of 12 to 20 purple flowers.

== Description ==
Swainsona fuscoviridis is a perennial shrub, that typically grows to a height of about 25 cm (9.8 in) and has many erect or prostrate stems mostly 1.5–2.5 mm (0.059–0.098 in) wide. The leaves are imparipinnate, mostly 30–60 mm (1.2–2.4 in) long with 7 or 9 elliptic linear or egg-shaped to lance-shaped leaflets with the narrower end towards the base, 10–20 mm (0.39–0.79 in) long and 1–3 mm (0.039–0.118 in) wide with stipules 2–4 mm (0.079–0.157 in) long at the base of the petioles. The flowers are purple, arranged in racemes of 12 to 20 or more and up to 100–250 mm (3.9–9.8 in), on a peduncle 1–2 mm (0.039–0.079 in) wide, each flower on a pedicel 1–3 mm (0.039–0.118 in) long. The sepals are joined at the base to form a hairy tube 1–2 mm (0.039–0.079 in) long. The standard petal is about 7 mm (0.28 in) long and 6–8 mm (0.24–0.31 in) wide, the wings 6–7 mm (0.24–0.28 in) long and the keel about 5–7 mm (0.20–0.28 in) long and 2 mm (0.079 in) deep. The fruit is an oblong pod 14–15 mm (0.55–0.59 in) long and 4–5 mm (0.16–0.20 in) wide.

== Taxonomy and naming ==
Swainsona fuscoviridis was first formally described in 1993 by Joy Thompson in the journal Telopea from specimens collected 35 km (22 mi) north-east of Yunta in 1973. The specific epithet (fuscoviridis) means "dark green", and refers to the dark colour of the foliage when dried.

== Distribution ==
This species of pea grows in arid tussock grassland north of Adelaide and west of Broken Hill in South Australia.
