= Swainsona cornuta =

Scientific classification
- Kingdom: Plantae
- Clade: Tracheophytes
- Clade: Angiosperms
- Clade: Eudicots
- Clade: Rosids
- Order: Fabales
- Family: Fabaceae
- Subfamily: Faboideae
- Genus: Swainsona
- Species: S. cornuta

Binomial name
- Swainsona cornuta Joy Thomps.

Species of plant

Swainsona cornuta is a species of flowering plant in the family Fabaceae and is endemic to the west of Western Australia. It is a low-lying, annual or perennial herb with imparipinnate leaves usually with about 7 elliptic leaflets and racemes of 3 to 7 purple flowers.

== Description ==
Swainsona cornuta is a low-lying annual or perennial herb, usually less than 20 cm (7.9 in) high, its stems covered with long, fine hairs uo to 0.75 mm (0.030 in) long. Its leaves are imparipinnate, less than 50 mm (2.0 in) long, sometimes with stipules up to 10 mm (0.39 in) long at the base of the petiole. There are about 7 elliptic leaflets up to about 10 mm (0.39 in) and 5 mm (0.20 in) wide. The flowers are purple, arranged in racemes up to 150 mm (5.9 in) or more long, with 3 to 7, each flower 10–15 mm (0.39–0.59 in) long on a softly-hairy peduncle 1 mm (0.039 in) long. The sepals are joined at the base, forming a tube about 15 mm (0.59 in) long with the sepal lobes much longer than the sepal tube. The standard petal is 10–15 mm (0.39–0.59 in) long and 8–12 mm (0.31–0.47 in) long, the wings 7–8 mm (0.28–0.31 in) long, and the keel 8–9 mm (0.31–0.35 in) long. Flowering has been observed August.

== Taxonomy and naming ==
Swainsona cornuta was first formally described in 1990 by Joy Thompson in the journal Telopea, from a specimen collected near the 850km post on the North West Coastal Highway in 1972. The specific epithet (cornuta) means "horned", referring to the projections on the keel petal.

== Distribution and habitat ==
This species grows in red clay in the Carnarvon and Murchison bioregions in the west of Western Australia.
