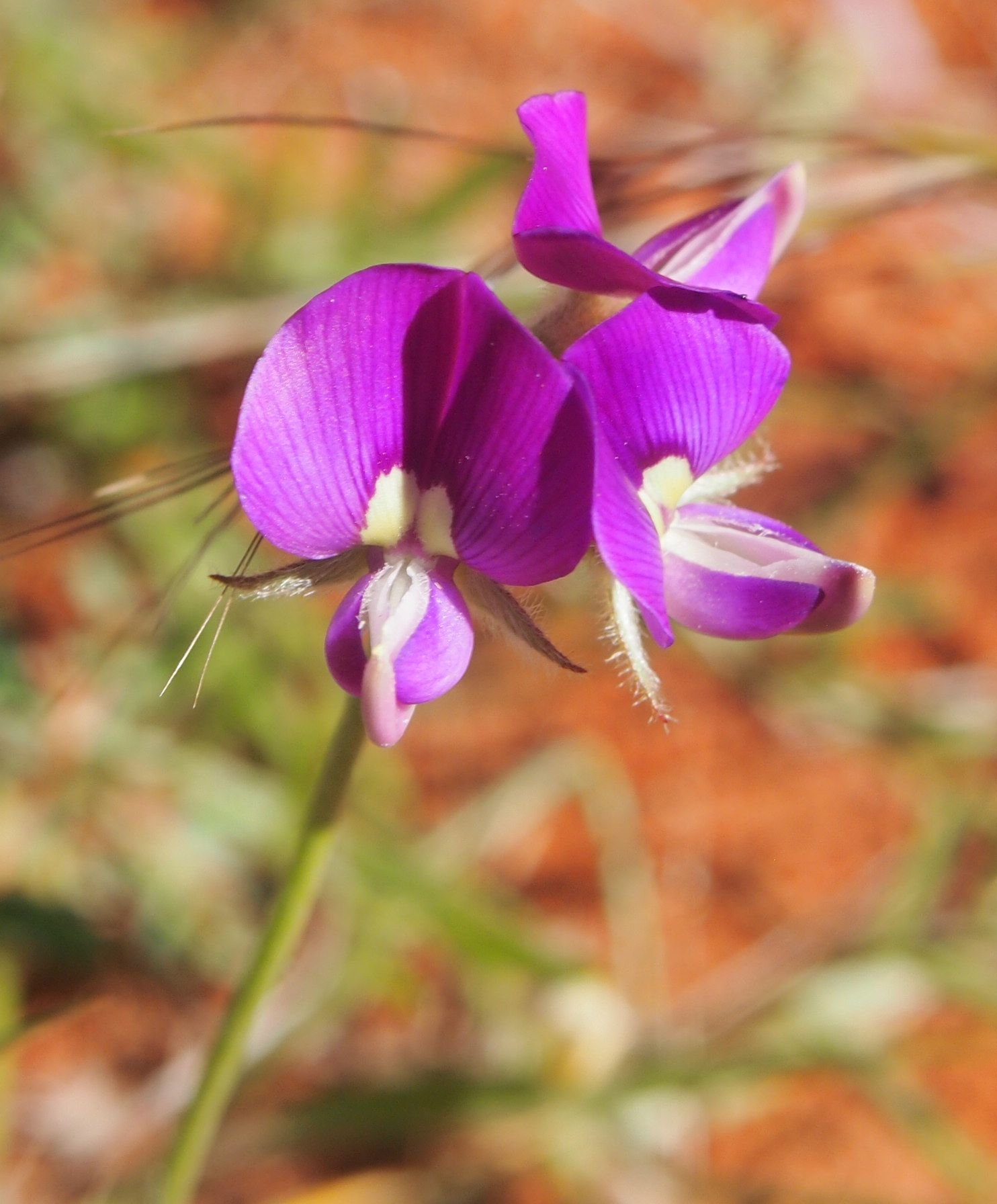

Scientific classification
- Kingdom: Plantae
- Clade: Tracheophytes
- Clade: Angiosperms
- Clade: Eudicots
- Clade: Rosids
- Order: Fabales
- Family: Fabaceae
- Subfamily: Faboideae
- Genus: Swainsona
- Species: S. phacoides

Binomial name
- Swainsona phacoides Benth.

Synonyms
- List: Swainsona phacoides Benth. subsp. phacoides; Swainsona phacoides var. argyrophylla J.M.Black; Swainsona phacoides var. oocarpa J.M.Black; Swainsona phacoides var. parviflora Benth.; Swainsona phacoides Benth. var. phacoides; Swainsona uniflora J.M.Black; Swainsonia phacoides F.Muell. orth. var.

= Swainsona phacoides =

Dwarf Swainson-pea

Species of plant

Swainsona phacoides commonly known as dwarf Swainson-pea or lilac Darling pea, is a flowering plant in the family Fabaceae, and is native to all mainland states of Australia and the Northern Territory. It is a prostrate or ascending perennial herb with imparipinnate leaves usually with 5 to 13 elliptic leaflets tapered at both ends, and racemes of usually 7 4 usually pale to dark reddish-purple.

== Description ==
Swainsona phacoides is a prostrate or ascending perennial herb, often reaching more than about 30 cm (12 in) high with stems more or less densely covered in soft, short hairs. The leaves are 5–10 cm (2.0–3.9 in) long and imparipinnate with elliptic leaflets tapered at both ends, the lower leaflets 5–30 mm (0.20–1.18 in) long, 1–5 mm (0.039–0.197 in) wide, apex pointed, rounded or notched, upper and lower surfaces thickly or sparsely covered in soft, short hairs and stipules about 5 mm (0.20 in) long. The flowers are borne in racemes of 1-10, usually 10–15 mm (0.39–0.59 in) long, corolla light to dark reddish purple, keel blunt and rounded, longer than the wings, standard petal usually 7–14 mm (0.28–0.55 in) long, 7–14 mm (0.28–0.55 in) wide, broadly egg-shaped to almost orb-shaped and tapering at the base. Flowering occurs from August to October and the fruit is an oblong-elliptic shaped pod usually 15–35 mm (0.59–1.38 in) long and covered in soft, short hairs.

== Taxonomy and naming ==
Swainsona phacoides was first formally described in 1848 by George Bentham and the description was published in Thomas Mitchell's Journal of an Expedition into the Interior of Tropical Australia. The specific epithet (phacoides) refers to a similarity to the genus Phaca, now known as Astragalus.

== Distribution and habitat ==
Dwarf Swainson-pea grows in sandy, red loam and rocky soils in all mainland states of Australia and the Northern Territory.
