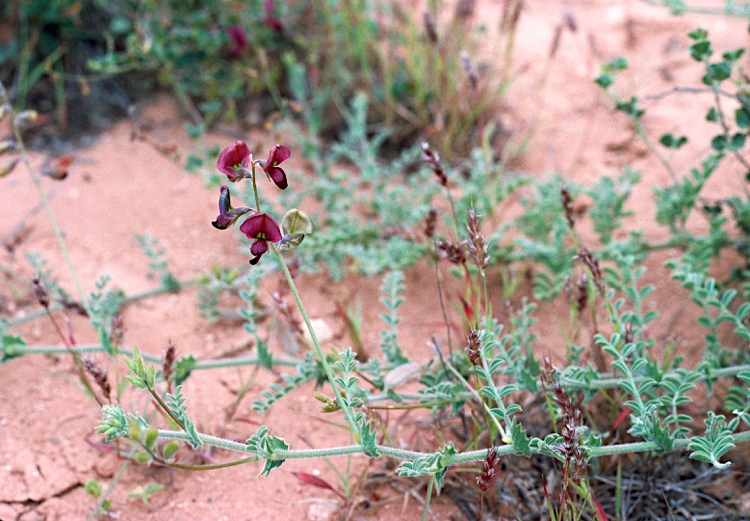
- Near Exmouth

Scientific classification
- Kingdom: Plantae
- Clade: Tracheophytes
- Clade: Angiosperms
- Clade: Eudicots
- Clade: Rosids
- Order: Fabales
- Family: Fabaceae
- Subfamily: Faboideae
- Genus: Swainsona
- Species: S. beasleyana

Binomial name
- Swainsona beasleyana F.Muell.

Synonyms
- Swainsona beasleyana F.Muell. subsp. beasleyana

= Swainsona beasleyana =

Species of legume

Swainsona beasleyana is a species of flowering plant in the family Fabaceae and is endemic to inland areas of Western Australia. It is a low-lying perennial herb with imparipinnate leaves usually with 15 to 19 egg-shaped leaflets with the narrower end towards the base, and racemes of 3 to 8 pale or dark purple flowers.

== Description ==
Swainsona beasleyana is a low-lying perennial herb, that typically grows to a height of up to 20 cm (7.9 in) with many hairy stems arising from its base. Its leaves are imparipinnate, 5–10 mm (0.20–0.39 in) long usually with 15 to 19 broadly egg-shaped leaflets with the narrower end towards the base, the leaflets variable in size. The flowers are arranged in racemes 200–300 mm (7.9–11.8 in) long of 3 to 8 or more on a peduncle 2–4 mm (0.079–0.157 in) in diameter, each flower 17–22 mm (0.67–0.87 in) long. The sepals are joined at the base, forming a tube about 3 mm (0.12 in) long, the sepal lobes about the same length as the tube. The petals are pale or dark purple, the standard petal 15–25 mm (0.59–0.98 in) long and 10–20 mm (0.39–0.79 in) wide, the wings up to 15 mm (0.59 in) long, and the keel about 22 mm (0.87 in) long. Flowering occurs in August and September, and the fruit is a narrowly oblong pod 20–25 mm (0.79–0.98 in) long and 5–7 mm (0.20–0.28 in) wide with the remains of the style about 7 mm (0.28 in) long.

== Taxonomy and naming ==
Swainsona beasleyana was first formally described in 1887 by Ferdinand von Mueller in The Chemist and Druggist of Australasia, from specimens collected by "Henry King and Thomas Beasley" near Lake Austin. The specific epithet (beasleyana) honours Thomas Beasley (1860–1902).

== Distribution and habitat ==
This species of pea grows in soakage areas in sandy or gravelly loam in scattered locations in the Avon Wheatbelt, Coolgardie, Great Victoria Desert, Murchison, Nullarbor and Yalgoo bioregions of inland Western Australia.
