= Swainsona disjuncta =

Conservation status
- Priority One — Poorly Known Taxa (DEC)

Scientific classification
- Kingdom: Plantae
- Clade: Tracheophytes
- Clade: Angiosperms
- Clade: Eudicots
- Clade: Rosids
- Order: Fabales
- Family: Fabaceae
- Subfamily: Faboideae
- Genus: Swainsona
- Species: S. disjuncta

Binomial name
- Swainsona disjuncta Joy Thomps.

Species of legume

Swainsona disjuncta is a species of flowering plant in the family Fabaceae and is endemic to widely separated areas of central Australia. It is a prostrate perennial herb with imparipinnate leaves with 3 to 9 egg-shaped leaflets, and racemes of purple, pink or red flowers in racemes of 3 to 15.

== Description ==
Swainsona disjuncta is a prostrate perennial herb, that has several stems arising from a slender taproot. The leaves are imparipinnate, mostly 15–80 mm (0.59–3.15 in) long with 3 to 9 egg-shaped leaflets with their narrower end towards the base, the leaflets mostly 5–15 mm (0.20–0.59 in) long and 2–10 mm (0.079–0.394 in) wide with narrow stipules 3–8 mm (0.12–0.31 in) long at the base of the petioles. The flowers are purple, pink or red, arranged in racemes of 3 to 15 on a peduncle 0.5–1.5 mm (0.020–0.059 in) wide with slender bracts 3–4 mm (0.12–0.16 in) long at the base. The sepals are joined at the base and hairy, forming a tube about 1 mm (0.039 in) long with lobes usually twice as long as the tube. The standard petal is 7–10 mm (0.28–0.39 in) long, the wings 7–9 mm (0.28–0.35 in) long and the keel 8–10 mm (0.31–0.39 in) long and 3.5–4.5 mm (0.14–0.18 in) deep. The fruit is a pod about 10 mm (0.39 in) long and 6 mm (0.24 in) wide.

== Taxonomy and naming ==
Swainsona disjuncta was first formally described in 1993 by Joy Thompson in the journal Telopea, from specimens collected by Roy Pullen about 115 km (71 mi) east of Norseman in 1979. The specific epithet (disjuncta) means "separate", referring to the disjunct distribution of the species.

== Distribution ==
This species of pea grows in disjunct areas of central Australia, including the Fraser Range in southern Western Australia, in nearby areas of the Northern Territory and Western Australia, and on the Eyre Peninsula of southern South Australia.

== Conservation status ==
Swainsona disjuncta is listed as "Threatened" by the Western Australian Government Department of Biodiversity, Conservation and Attractions, meaning that it is in danger of extinction.
