= Swainsona vestita =

Scientific classification
- Kingdom: Plantae
- Clade: Tracheophytes
- Clade: Angiosperms
- Clade: Eudicots
- Clade: Rosids
- Order: Fabales
- Family: Fabaceae
- Subfamily: Faboideae
- Genus: Swainsona
- Species: S. vestita

Binomial name
- Swainsona vestita Joy Thomps.

Species of plant

Swainsona vestita is a species of flowering plant in the family Fabaceae and is endemic to central-northern South Australia. It is an erect or ascending perennial plant with imparipinnate leaves with about 7 narrowly lance-shaped leaflets, and racemes of 5 to 20 purple flowers.

== Description ==
Swainsona vestita is an erect or ascending perennial plant that typically grows to a height of up to about 25 cm (9.8 in), and has many strongly ridged stems. Its leaves are imparipinnate, about 30–100 mm (1.2–3.9 in) long with about 7 narrowly lance-shaped leaflets, the side leaflets mostly 10–25 mm (0.39–0.98 in) long, 1–3 mm (0.039–0.118 in) wide and hairy. There is a stipule mostly about 5 mm (0.20 in) long at the base of the petiole. The flowers are arranged in racemes 50–200 mm (2.0–7.9 in) long with 5 to 20 flowers on a peduncle 1.0–1.5 mm (0.039–0.059 in) wide, each flower about 10 mm (0.39 in) long on a hairy pedicel about 1–3 mm (0.039–0.118 in) long. The sepals are joined at the base, forming a tube 2.0–2.5 mm (0.079–0.098 in) long, the sepal lobes about as slightly longer than the tube. The petals are purple, the standard petal 10–12 mm (0.39–0.47 in) long and 9–12 mm (0.35–0.47 in) wide, the wings 8–10 mm (0.31–0.39 in) long, and the keel about 10–11 mm (0.39–0.43 in) long and about 4 mm (0.16 in) deep.

== Taxonomy and naming ==
Swainsona vestita was first formally described in 1993 by Joy Thompson in the journal Telopea from specimens collected west of Coober Pedy in 1980. The specific epithet (vestita) means "clothed", and refers to the "long, conspicuous hairs".

== Distribution and habitat ==
This species of pea grows on open, stony plains with shrubs and grasses in a small area of central-northern South Australia.
