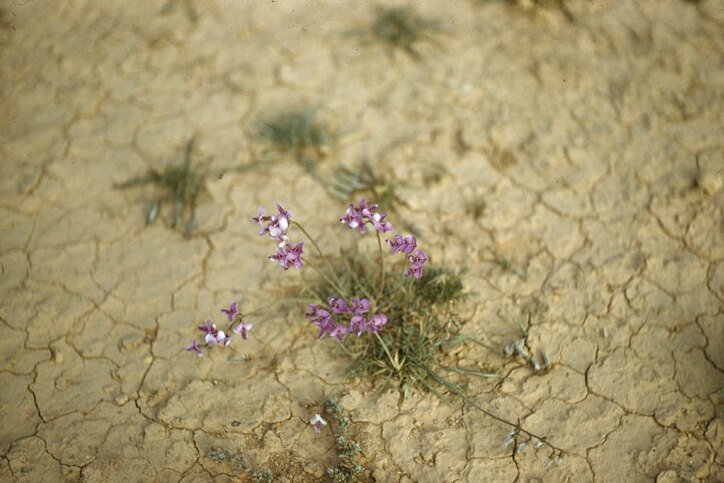
- Near Koonalda Cave

Scientific classification
- Kingdom: Plantae
- Clade: Tracheophytes
- Clade: Angiosperms
- Clade: Eudicots
- Clade: Rosids
- Order: Fabales
- Family: Fabaceae
- Subfamily: Faboideae
- Genus: Swainsona
- Species: S. campestris

Binomial name
- Swainsona campestris J.M.Black

= Swainsona campestris =

Species of legume

Swainsona campestris is a species of flowering plant in the family Fabaceae and is endemic to arid areas of southern Australia. It is an erect perennial herb with imparipinnate leaves with 9 to 11 linear to narrowly lance-shaped leaflets, and racemes of pink or purple flowers in racemes of 5 to 10.

== Description ==
Swainsona campestris is an erect perennial herb, that typically grows to a height of up to 60 cm (24 in) with stems 1.5–2.5 mm (0.059–0.098 in) wide and hairy. The leaves are imparipinnate, mostly 5–8 mm (0.20–0.31 in) long with 9 to 11 linear to lance-shaped leaflets, the leaflets 5–20 mm (0.20–0.79 in) long and 1–2 mm (0.039–0.079 in) wide with stipules 3–10 mm (0.12–0.39 in) long at the base of the petiole. The flowers are pink or purple, arranged in racemes of 5 to 10, each flower 8–10 mm (0.31–0.39 in) long on a peduncle 0.5–1.5 mm (0.020–0.059 in) wide with egg-shaped bracts about 2 mm (0.079 in) long at the base. The sepals are softly-hairy and joined at the base, forming a tube about 2.5 mm (0.098 in) long with the lobes shorter than the sepal tube. The standard petal is 10–12 mm (0.39–0.47 in) long, 3–10 mm (0.12–0.39 in) wide, the wings 6–10 mm (0.24–0.39 in) long and the keel 7–9 mm (0.28–0.35 in) long. Flowering usually occurs from July to October, and the fruit is an oblong pod 10–20 mm (0.39–0.79 in) long and 4–5 mm (0.16–0.20 in) wide.

== Taxonomy and naming ==
Swainsona campestris was first formally described in 1926 by John McConnell Black in the Flora of South Australia. The specific epithet (campestris) means "pertaining to a plain".

== Distribution and habitat ==
This species of pea grows in sandy soil on treeless plains or sparse woodland in South Australia and south-eastern Western Australia.

== Conservation status ==
Swainsona campestris is listed as "not threatened" in Western Australia by the Western Australian Government Department of Biodiversity, Conservation and Attractions.
