= Swainsona paucifoliolata =

Scientific classification
- Kingdom: Plantae
- Clade: Tracheophytes
- Clade: Angiosperms
- Clade: Eudicots
- Clade: Rosids
- Order: Fabales
- Family: Fabaceae
- Subfamily: Faboideae
- Genus: Swainsona
- Species: S. paucifoliolata

Binomial name
- Swainsona paucifoliolata Joy Thomps.

Species of plant

Swainsona paucifoliolata is a prostrate, spreading or scrambling perennial herb in the family Fabaceae and is endemic to inland areas in the north of Western Australia. It has 3 to 7 usually narrowly lance-shaped leaflets, and racemes of 3 to 16 purple flowers.

== Description ==
Swainsona paucifoliolata is a prostrate, spreading or scrambling perennial herb that typically grows to a height of about 15 cm (5.9 in) with up to 3 prostrate or ascending stems from the top of the taproot. Its leaves are mostly 5–7 mm (0.20–0.28 in) long with about 3 to 7 usually narrowly lance-shaped leaflets, the side leaflets 10–25 mm (0.39–0.98 in) long and 2–3 mm (0.079–0.118 in) wide with stipules 2–6 mm (0.079–0.236 in) long at the base of the petioles. The flowers are arranged in racemes up to 50–150 mm (2.0–5.9 in) long with up to 3 to about 16 flowers on a peduncle 0.5–2 mm (0.020–0.079 in) wide, each flower about 7–10 mm (0.28–0.39 in) long on a hairy pedicel 1–2 mm (0.039–0.079 in) long. The sepals are joined at the base, forming a tube about 2 mm (0.079 in) long, the sepal lobes longer than the tube. The petals are purple, the standard petal about 8–10 mm (0.31–0.39 in) long and wide, the wings 7–8 mm (0.28–0.31 in) long, and the keel 8–10 mm (0.31–0.39 in) long and 2–3 mm (0.079–0.118 in) deep. Flowering occurs from April to August or September and the fruit is oblong, about 10–15 mm (0.39–0.59 in) and about 4 mm (0.16 in) wide.

== Taxonomy ==
Swainsona paucifoliolata was first formally described in 1993 by Joy Thompson in the journal Telopea from a specimen collected near Meekatharra in 1957. The specific epithet (paucifoliolata) means "few leaflets".

== Distribution and habitat ==
This species of swainsona grows in creeklines, claypans and soakage areas in the Little Sandy Desert, Murchison, Pilbara and Yalgoo bioregions of northern Western Australia.

== Conservation status ==
Swainsona paucifoliolata is listed as "not threatened" by the Government of Western Australia Department of Biodiversity, Conservation and Attractions.
