= Swainsona microcalyx =

Scientific classification
- Kingdom: Plantae
- Clade: Tracheophytes
- Clade: Angiosperms
- Clade: Eudicots
- Clade: Rosids
- Order: Fabales
- Family: Fabaceae
- Subfamily: Faboideae
- Genus: Swainsona
- Species: S. microcalyx

Binomial name
- Swainsona microcalyx J.M.Black

Synonyms
- Swainsona microcalyx J.M.Black subsp. microcalyx; Swainsona microcalyx J.M.Black var. microcalyx

Species of legume

Swainsona microcalyx, commonly known as wild violet, is a species of flowering plant in the family Fabaceae and is endemic to southern mainland Australia. It is a prostrate or low-growing perennial herb, with imparipinnate leaves with 5 to 9 broadly egg-shaped to wedge-shaped leaflets and racemes of 5 to 15 purple flowers.

== Description ==
Swainsona microcalyx is a perennial herb, low-lying at first, then with ascending stems up to 10–30 cm (3.9–11.8 in) long and hairy. The leaves are imparipinnate, mostly 30–90 mm (1.2–3.5 in) long with 5 to 9 broadly egg-shaped leaflets with the narrower end towards the base, or wedge-shaped, the lower leaflets mostly 3–15 mm (0.12–0.59 in) long and 1–4 mm (0.039–0.157 in) wide with stipules 1–5 mm (0.039–0.197 in) long at the base of the petioles. The flowers are purple, arranged in racemes of 5 to 15, on a peduncle 0.5–2 mm (0.020–0.079 in) wide, each flower 5–8 mm (0.20–0.31 in) long on a pedicel 1–3 mm (0.039–0.118 in) long. The sepals are joined at the base to form a tube 1.5–2.0 mm (0.059–0.079 in) long, with teeth shorter than the tube. The standard petal is 6–8 mm (0.24–0.31 in) long and 5–8 mm (0.20–0.31 in) wide, the wings 6–8 mm (0.24–0.31 in) long and the keel 6–8 mm (0.24–0.31 in) long and 2.0–2.5 mm (0.079–0.098 in) broad. The fruit is a narrowly egg-shaped to elliptic pod about 20 mm (0.79 in) long and 3–4 mm (0.12–0.16 in) wide with the remains of the style about 4 mm (0.16 in) long.

== Taxonomy and naming ==
Swainsona microcalyx was first formally described in 1924 by John McConnell Black in the Flora of South Australia. The specific epithet (microcalyx) means "a cup" referring to the shape of the sepal tube.

== Distribution ==
This species of pea is mostly found north of the Eyre Peninsula in South Australia, with an outlier in inland Western Australia.
