= Swainsona rostellata =

Scientific classification
- Kingdom: Plantae
- Clade: Tracheophytes
- Clade: Angiosperms
- Clade: Eudicots
- Clade: Rosids
- Order: Fabales
- Family: Fabaceae
- Subfamily: Faboideae
- Genus: Swainsona
- Species: S. rostellata

Binomial name
- Swainsona rostellata A.T.Lee

Species of legume

Swainsona rostellata is a species of flowering plant in the family Fabaceae and is endemic to inland areas of Western Australia. It is a prostrate perennial herb with imparipinnate leaves with 7 to 13 wedge-shaped leaflets, and racemes of usually up to 3 purple flowers.

== Description ==
Swainsona rostellata is a prostrate, perennial herb that typically grows to a height of up to 5 cm (2.0 in) high and 45 cm (18 in) wide with sparsely hairy stems. Its leaves are imparipinnate, 10–50 mm (0.39–1.97 in) long on a sometimes very long petiole, with 7 to 13 wedge-shaped leaflets, the side leaflets 1–5 mm (0.039–0.197 in) long and 1–2 mm (0.039–0.079 in) wide. There is a variably shaped stipule 1–2 mm (0.039–0.079 in) long at the base of the petiole. The flowers are arranged in racemes 10–50 mm (0.39–1.97 in) long with up to 3 flowers on a peduncle about 0.5 mm (0.020 in) long, the flowers variable in size from 1 to 8 mm (0.039 to 0.315 in) long on a pedicel 1–2 mm (0.039–0.079 in) long. The sepals are joined at the base, forming a tube about 1.0–1.5 mm (0.039–0.059 in) long, the sepal lobes almost as long as the tube. The petals are purple, the standard petal 4–7 mm (0.16–0.28 in) long and 4–8 mm (0.16–0.31 in) wide, the wings 3–7 mm (0.12–0.28 in) long, and the keel about 4–6 mm (0.16–0.24 in) long and 1–2 mm (0.039–0.079 in) deep. Flowering occurs from July to September and the fruit is about 6–10 mm (0.24–0.39 in) long and 5–8 mm (0.20–0.31 in) wide.

== Taxonomy and naming ==
Swainsona rostellata was first formally described in 1948 by Alma Theodora Lee in Contributions from the New South Wales National Herbarium, from specimens collected by Charles Gardner on Mount Magnet in 1931. The specific epithet (rostellata) means "possessing a small beak or snout", referring to the tip of the keel.

== Distribution and habitat ==
This species of pea grows red soil or clay loam on the edges of salt lakes or near swamps, in the Coolgardie, Murchison and Yalgoo bioregions of inland Western Australia.
