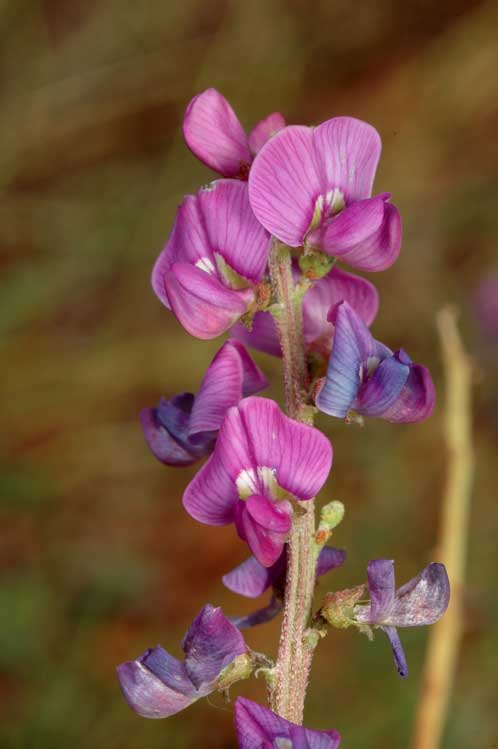
- Swainsona affinis

Scientific classification
- Kingdom: Plantae
- Clade: Tracheophytes
- Clade: Angiosperms
- Clade: Eudicots
- Clade: Rosids
- Order: Fabales
- Family: Fabaceae
- Subfamily: Faboideae
- Tribe: Galegeae
- Subtribe: Astragalinae
- Genus: Swainsona; Salisb.

Species
- See text.

Synonyms
- List: Cyclogyne Benth. ex Lindl.; Diplolobium F.Muell. nom. illeg., nom. superfl.; Loxidium Vent.; Rysodium Steven (1832), nom. nud.; Swainsonia Anon. orth. var.; Willdampia A.S.George

= Swainsona =

Genus of legumes

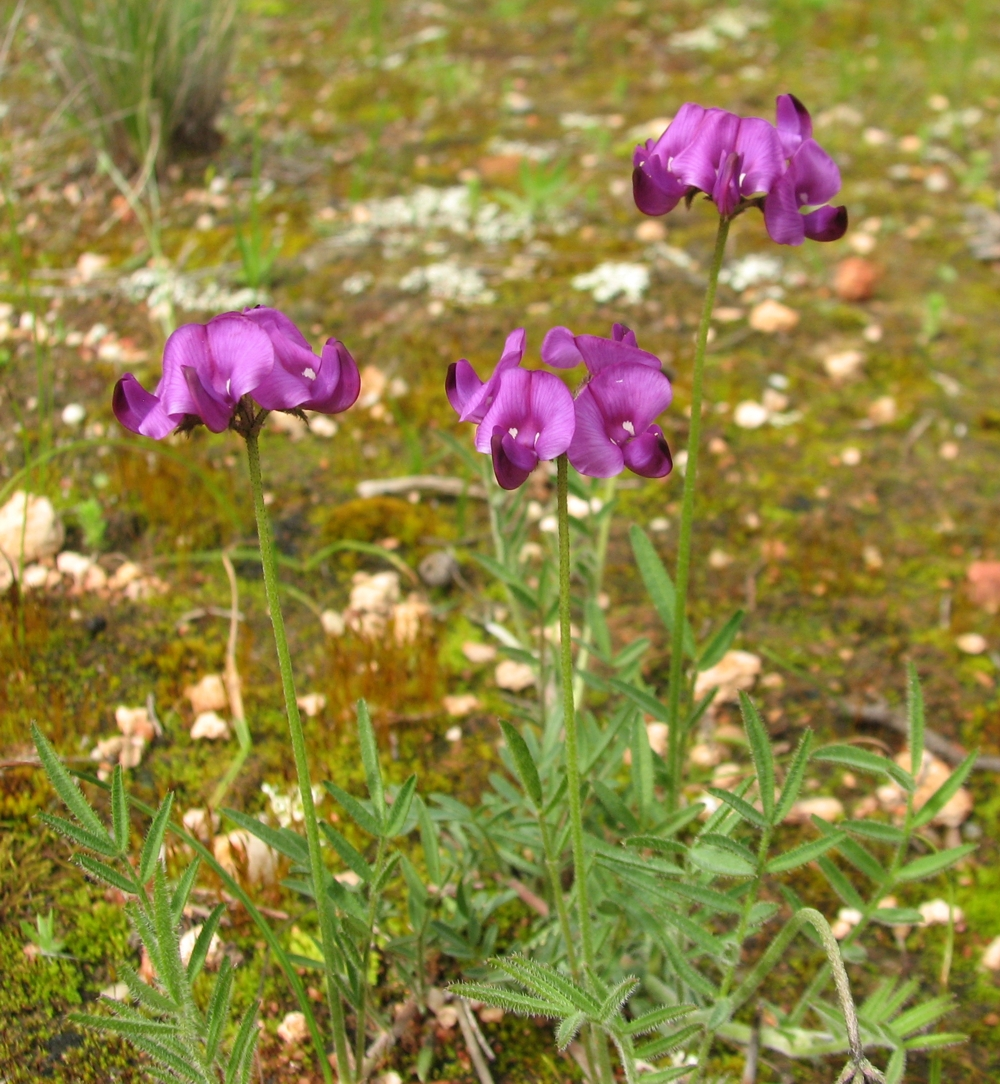
Swainsona behriana

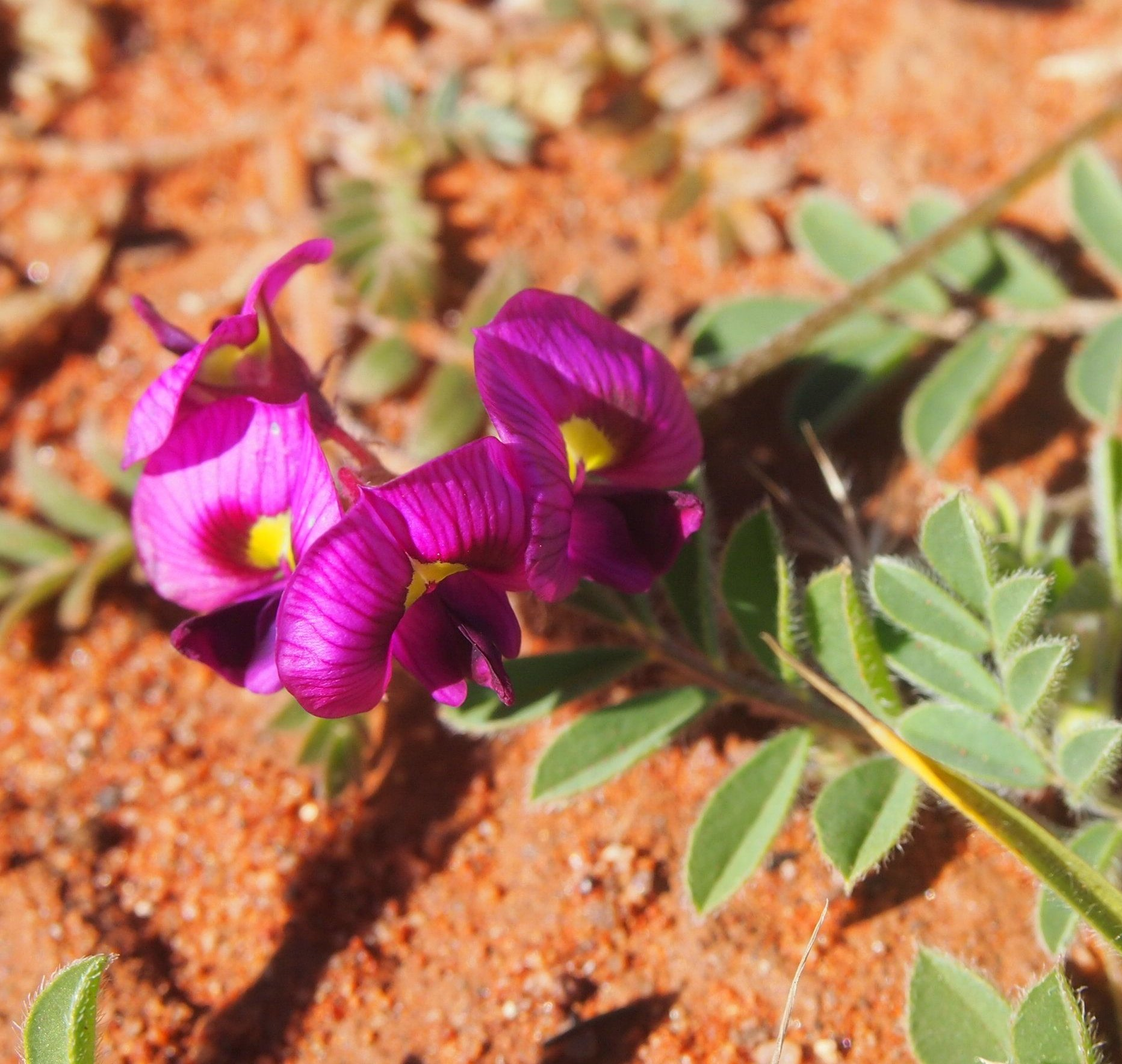
Swainsona burkei

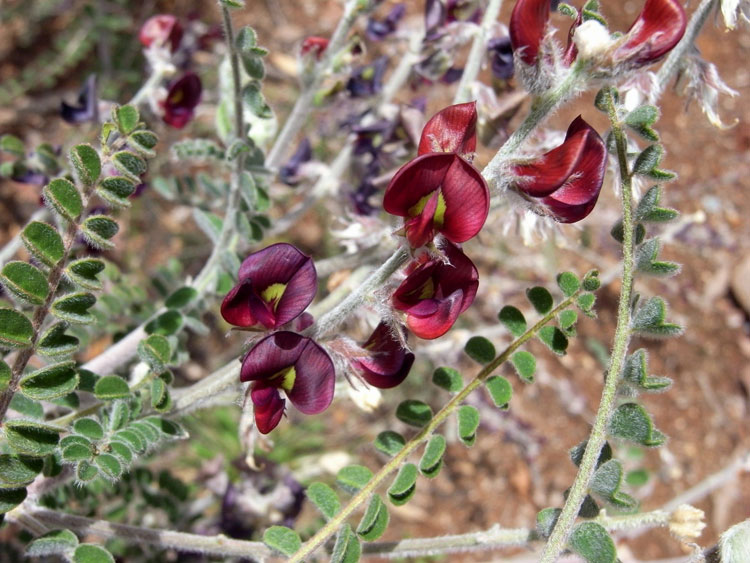
Swainsona burkittii

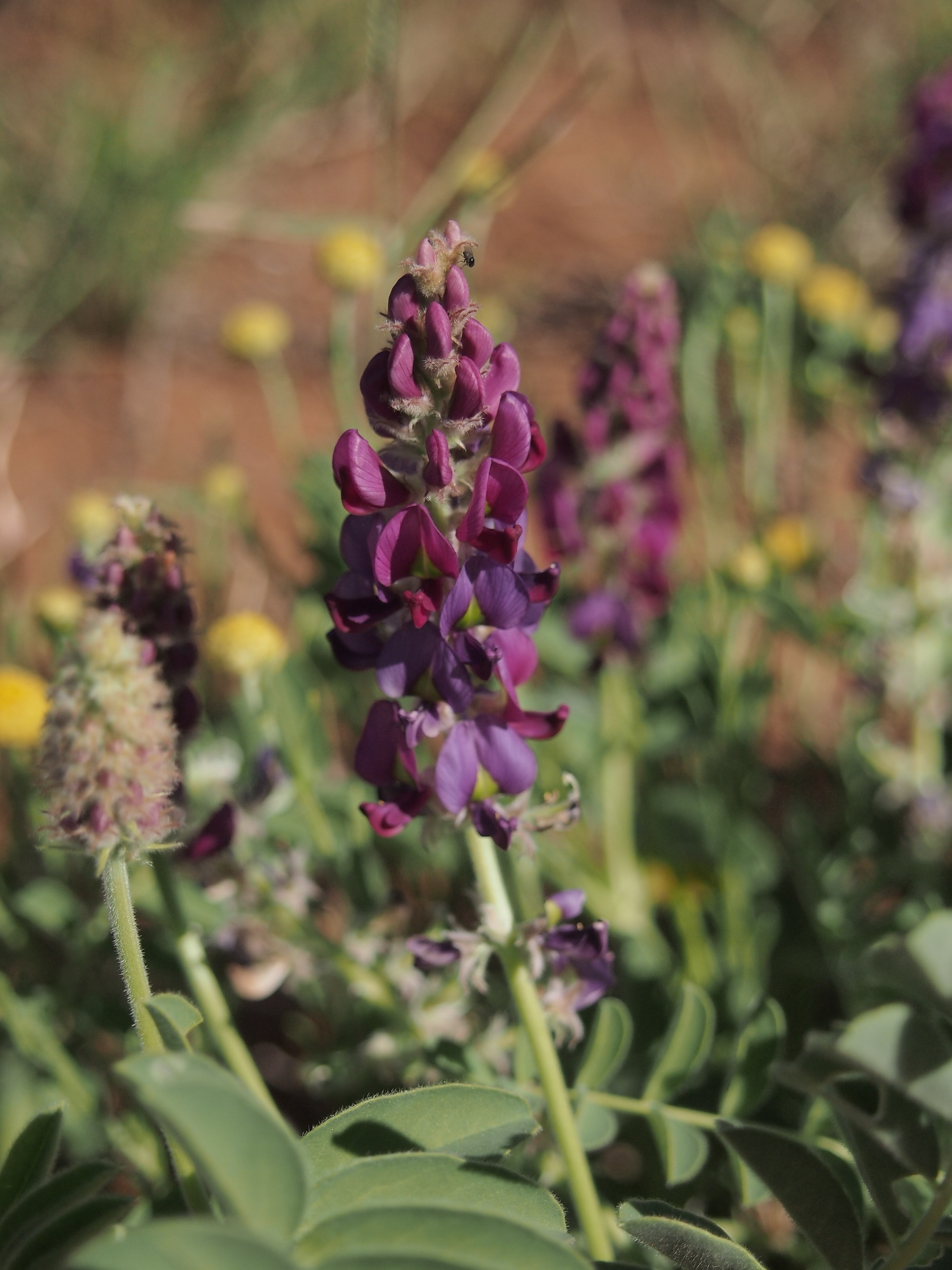
Swainsona canescens

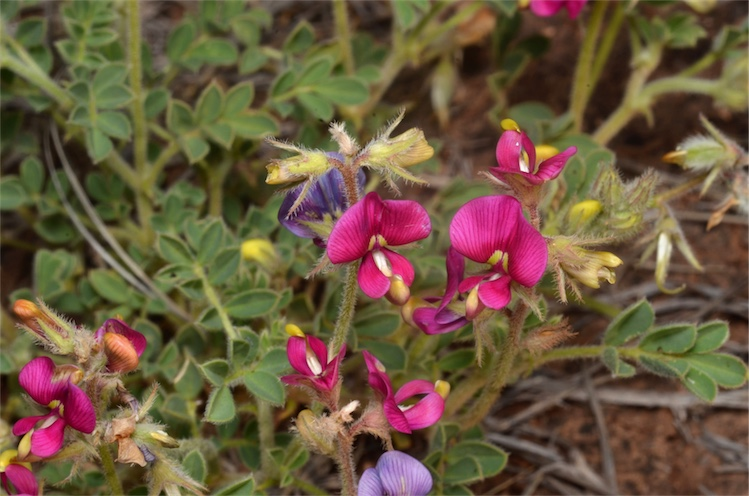
Swainsona flavicarinata

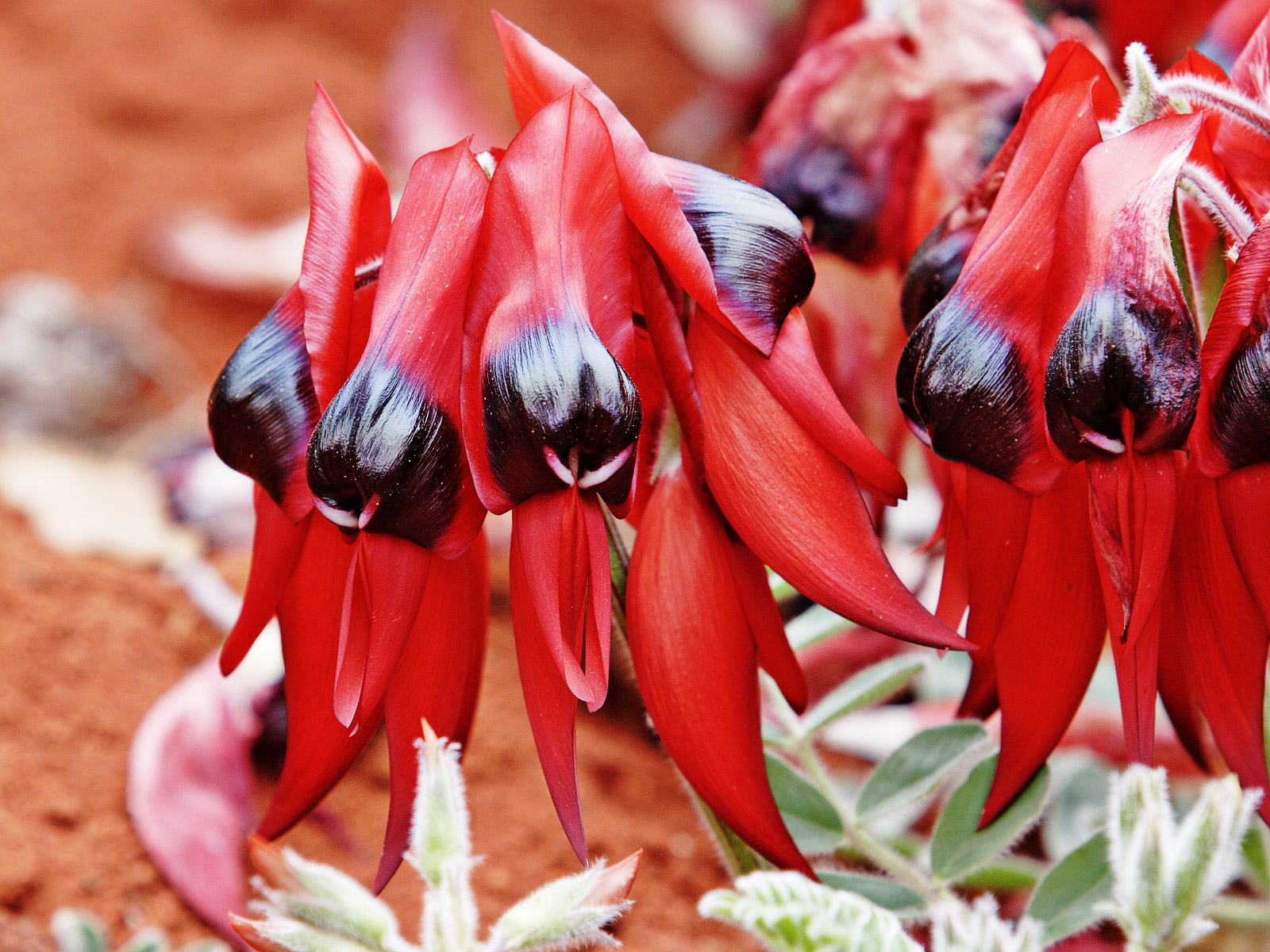
Swainsona formosa

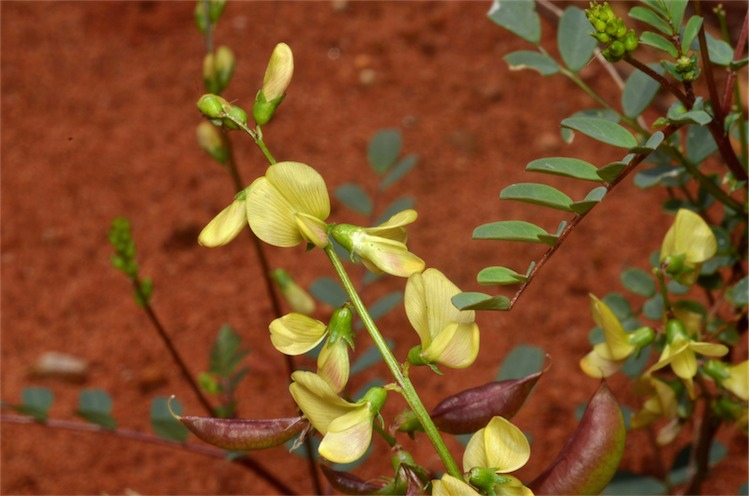
Swainsona laxa

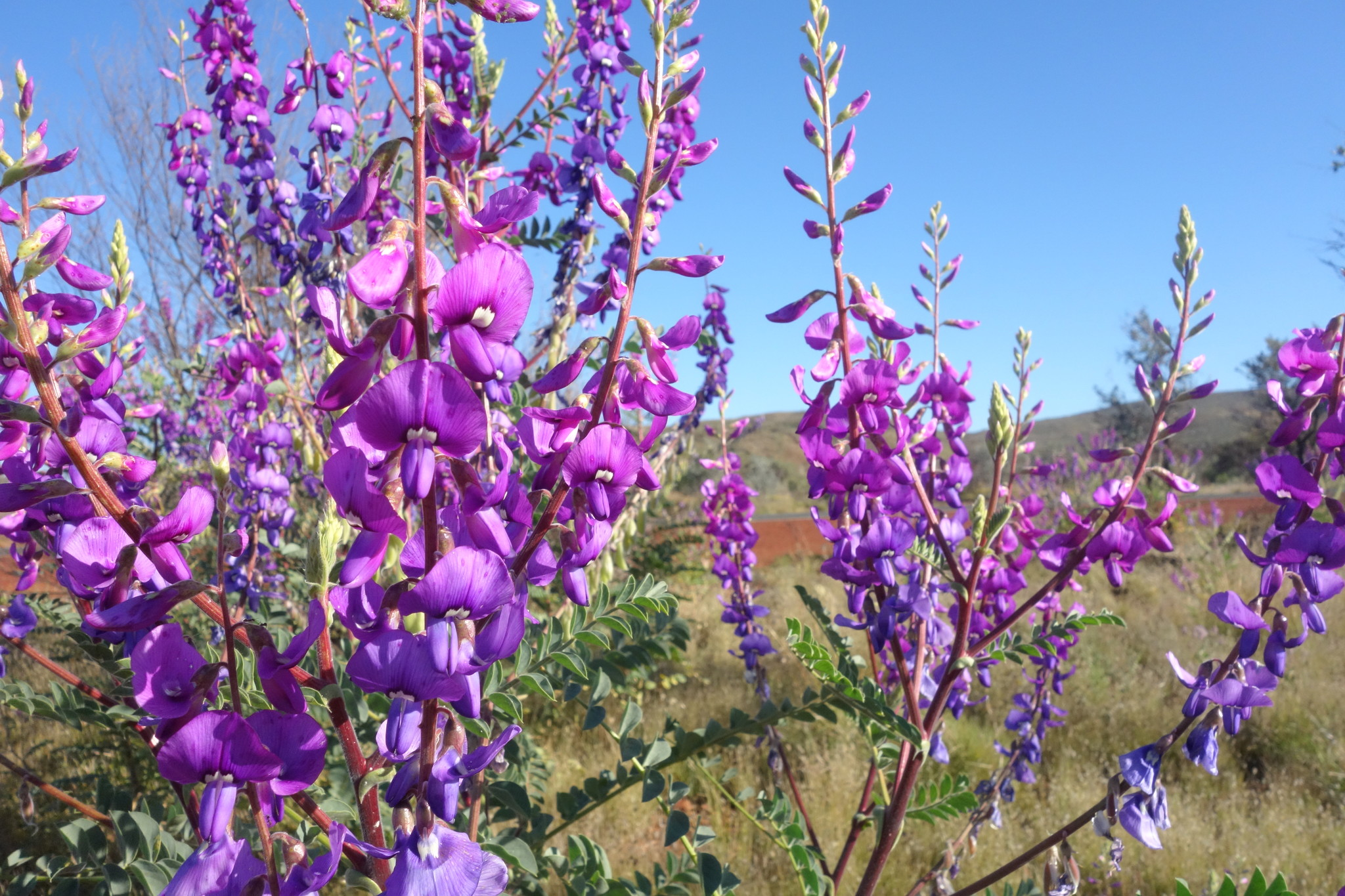
Swainsona maccullochiana

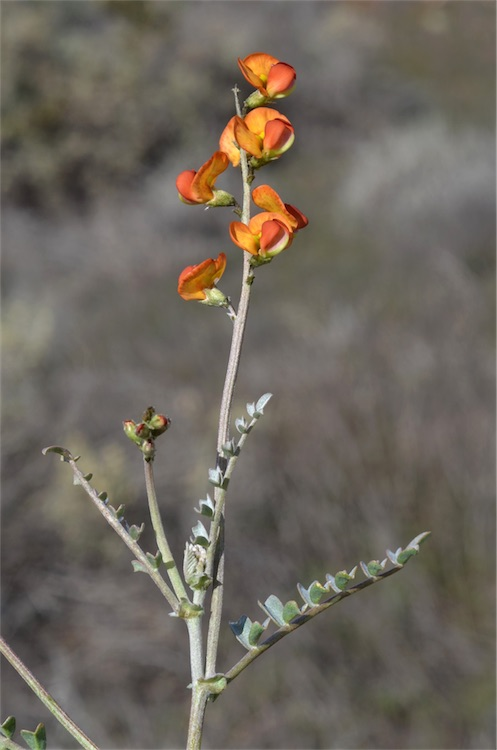
Swainsona stipularis

Swainsona is a genus of about 85 species of flowering plants in the family Fabaceae, and is endemic to Australia. Plants in this genus are herbs or subshrubs with imparipinnate leaves and usually purple flowers similar to others in the family.

== Description ==
Plants in the genus Swainsona are prostrate to erect annual or perennial herbs or subshrubs, often with many stems at the base. The leaves are usually imparipinnate (pinnate, with a terminal leaflet) with a few to many leaflets, with stipules at the base of the petiole. A few to many flowers are borne in a raceme in leaf axils on an erect peduncle with bracts at the base, and small bracteoles at the base of the sepals. The sepals are joined at the base to form a bell-shaped tube with 5 equal lobes, or the upper 2 lobes shorter. The petals are mostly purple, sometimes white, pink, yellow orange or red. The standard petal is kidney-shaped to more or less round, usually longer than the wings and often longer than the keel. There are ten stamens, nine of which are joined with each other and the tenth free and facing the standard petal.

== Taxonomy ==
The genus Swainsona was first formally described in 1806 by Richard Anthony Salisbury in Paradisus Londinensis and the first species he described (the type species) was Swainsona coronillifolia, (now accepted as a synonym of Swainsona galegifolia.

A member of the family Fabaceae (legumes), this species is most closely related to the New Zealand genera Montigena (scree pea), Clianthus (kakabeak), and Carmichaelia (New Zealand broom). The genus name (Swainsona) honours the English botanist Isaac Swainson.

A few species are known to produce swainsonine, a phytotoxin harmful to livestock (see Locoweed). In Australia, animals intoxicated with swainsonine are said to be pea struck.

=== Species list ===
The following is a list of species of Swainsona accepted by Plants of the World Online as of 10 September 2023:

- Swainsona acuticarinata (A.T.Lee) Joy Thomps. (N.T., S.A., W.A.)
- Swainsona adenophylla J.M.Black – violet swainson-pea, violet Darling pea (S.A., N.S.W., Vic.)
- Swainsona affinis (A.T.Lee) Joy Thomps. – common poison pea (W.A., S.A., N.T., Qld, N.S.W.)
- Swainsona beasleyana F.Muell. (W.A.)
- Swainsona behriana F.Muell. ex J.M.Black – Behr's swainsona (N.S.W., S.A., Vic.)
- Swainsona brachycarpa Benth. – slender swainson-pea (N.S.W., Qld., Vic.)
- Swainsona bracteata (Maiden & Betche) Joy Thomps. (N.S.W., Qld.)
- Swainsona burkei F.Muell. ex Benth. (N.T., Qld.)
- Swainsona burkittii F.Muell. ex Benth. – woolly Darling pea (S.A., N.S.W.)
- Swainsona cadellii F.Muell. ex C.Moore (N.S.W.)
- Swainsona calcicola Joy Thomps. (W.A.)
- Swainsona campestris J.M.Black (S.A., W.A.)
- Swainsona campylantha F.Muell. – Gilgai Darling pea (Qld., N.T., S.A., N.S.W., W.A.)
- Swainsona canescens (Benth.) F.Muell. – grey swainsona (Qld., S.A., W.A.)
- Swainsona colutoides F.Muell. – bladder senna, bladder vetch (W.A., N.T., S.A., N.S.W.)
- Swainsona complanata Joy Thomps. (W.A.)
- Swainsona cornuta Joy Thomps. (W.A.)
- Swainsona cyclocarpa F.Muell. (W.A., N.T.)
- Swainsona decurrens A.T.Lee (W.A.)
- Swainsona dictyocarpa J.M.Black (S.A.)
- Swainsona disjuncta Joy Thomps. (W.A., S.A., N.T.)
- Swainsona ecallosa Sprague (W.A.)
- Swainsona elegans A.T.Lee (W.A.)
- Swainsona elegantoides (A.T.Lee) Joy Thomps. (W.A.)
- Swainsona eremaea Joy Thomps. (S.A.)
- Swainsona extrajacens Joy Thomps. (S.A., N.S.W.)
- Swainsona fissimontana J.M.Black (S.A., N.S.W.)
- Swainsona flavicarinata J.M.Black (W.A., N.T., S.A., Qld., N.S.W.)
- Swainsona formosa (G.Don) Joy Thomps. – Sturt's desert pea or Sturt pea (W.A., N.T., S.A., Qld., N.S.W.)
- Swainsona forrestii F.Muell. ex A.T.Lee (W.A.)
- Swainsona fraseri Benth. (N.S.W., Qld.)
- Swainsona fuscoviridis Joy Thomps. (S.A.)
- Swainsona galegifolia (Andrews) R.Br. – smooth Darling pea (N.S.W., Qld., Vic.)
- Swainsona gracilis Benth. (W.A.)
- Swainsona greyana Lindl. – Darling pea, hairy-Darling pea (S.A., N.S.W., Vic.)
- Swainsona halophila Joy Thomps. (W.A.)
- Swainsona incei W.R.Price (W.A.)
- Swainsona katjarra R.W.Davis & T.Hammer – Birriliburu swainsona (W.A.)
- Swainsona kingii F.Muell. (W.A., S.A.)
- Swainsona laciniata A.T.Lee (W.A., N.T.)
- Swainsona laxa R.Br. – skeleton pea, yellow swainson-pea, yellow Darling pea, sandhill swainsona (N.S.W., S.A., N.T., Qld.)
- Swainsona leeana J.Z.Weber (W.A., S.A.)
- Swainsona lessertiifolia DC. – coast swainson-pea, bog pea, Darling pea poison pea, poison vetch (S.A., Vic., Tas.)
- Swainsona longicarinata Joy Thomps. (W.A.)
- Swainsona longipilosa Joy Thomps. (W.A.)
- Swainsona luteola F.Muell. – dwarf Darling-pea (N.S.W., Qld)
- Swainsona maccullochiana F.Muell. – Ashburton pea (W.A.)
- Swainsona microcalyx J.M.Black – wild violet (S.A., W.A.)
- Swainsona microphylla A.Gray – small-leaf swainson-pea, small-leaf swainsona, poison swainson-pea (W.A., N.T., S.A., Qld., N.S.W., Vic.)
- Swainsona minutiflora A.T.Lee (S.A.)
- Swainsona monticola A.Cunn. ex Benth. – notched Swainson-pea (N.S.W., A.C.T.)
- Swainsona murrayana Wawra – slender Darling-pea, slender Darling pea (N.S.W., Vic., Qld., S.A.)
- Swainsona oligophylla F.Muell. ex Benth. (N.T., S.A., Qld., N.S.W.)
- Swainsona oliveri F.Muell. (W.A., N.T., S.A., N.S.W.)
- Swainsona oroboides F.Muell. ex Benth. – variable swainsona, kneed Darling pea (W.A., N.T., S.A., Qld., N.S.W.)
- Swainsona paradoxa W.Fitzg. (W.A.)
- Swainsona parviflora Benth. (Qld., N.S.W.)
- Swainsona paucifoliolata Joy Thomps. (W.A.)
- Swainsona pedunculata A.T.Lee (W.A.)
- Swainsona perlonga Joy Thomps. (W.A.)
- Swainsona phacoides Benth. – dwarf Swainson-pea, lilac Darling pea (N.S.W., Vic., S.A., W.A., N.T., Qld.)
- Swainsona plagiotropis – red swainsona-pea F.Muell. (N.S.W., Vic.)
- Swainsona procumbens – Broughton pea, swamp pea (F.Muell.) F.Muell. (N.S.W., Vic., Qld.)
- Swainsona pterostylis (DC.) Bakh.f. (W.A.)
- Swainsona purpurea – purple Swainson-pea, purple Darling pea (A.T.Lee) Joy Thomps. (W.A., S.A., N.T., Qld., N.S.W.)
- Swainsona pyrophila – yellow Swainson-pea, yellow Darling pea Joy Thomps. (S.A., Vic., N.S.W.)
- Swainsona queenslandica Joy Thomps. – smooth Darling pea (Qld., N.S.W.)
- Swainsona recta A.T.Lee – mountain Swainson-pea, small purple pea (N.S.W., Vic.)
- Swainsona reticulata J.M.Black – kneed Swainson-pea (S.A., N.S.W., Vic., Qld.)
- Swainsona rostellata A.T.Lee (W.A.)
- Swainsona rostrata Joy Thomps. (N.T., S.A.)
- Swainsona rotunda Joy Thomps. (W.A.)
- Swainsona sejuncta Joy Thomps. (Qld.)
- Swainsona sericea (A.T.Lee) J.M.Black ex H.Eichler – silky Swainson-pea, silky pea (N.S.W., Vic., S.A.)
- Swainsona similis Joy Thomps. (N.S.W., Qld.)
- Swainsona stenodonta F.Muell. (W.A.)
- Swainsona stipularis F.Muell. (N.S.W., S.A., Qld., Vic.)
- Swainsona swainsonioides (Benth.) A.T.Lee ex J.M.Black – downy Swainson-pea, downy Darling pea (N.S.W., S.A., Qld., Vic.)
- Swainsona tanamiensis Joy Thomps. (W.A., N.T.)
- Swainsona tenuis E.Pritz. (W.A., S.A., N.T.)
- Swainsona tephrotricha F.Muell. (S.A.)
- Swainsona thompsoniana R.W.Davis & P.J.H.Hurter (W.A.)
- Swainsona unifoliolata F.Muell. (W.A., N.T., S.A.)
- Swainsona vestita Joy Thomps. (S.A.)
- Swainsona villosa J.M.Black (W.A., N.T., S.A.)
- Swainsona viridis J.M.Black – creeping Darling pea (N.S.W., S.A.)

== Distribution ==
Species of Swainsona are found in all six Australian states and in the Northern Territory and Australian Capital Territory.
