= Swainsona extrajacens =

Scientific classification
- Kingdom: Plantae
- Clade: Tracheophytes
- Clade: Angiosperms
- Clade: Eudicots
- Clade: Rosids
- Order: Fabales
- Family: Fabaceae
- Subfamily: Faboideae
- Genus: Swainsona
- Species: S. extrajacens

Binomial name
- Swainsona extrajacens Joy Thomps.

Species of legume

Swainsona extrajacens is a species of flowering plant in the family Fabaceae and is endemic to central Australia. It is an erect, annual plant with imparipinnate leaves with 9 to 21 linear, egg-shaped leaflets, and racemes of purple flowers in racemes of 5 to 10.

== Description ==
Swainsona extrajacens is an erect, apparently annual, with one to several stems mostly 2–4 mm (0.079–0.157 in) wide, that typically grows to 30 cm (12 in) high. The leaves are imparipinnate, 30–150 mm (1.2–5.9 in) long with 9 to 25 linear, egg-shaped leaflets mostly 10–15 mm (0.39–0.59 in) long and 2–5 mm (0.079–0.197 in) wide with narrowly lance-shaped stipules about 5 mm (0.20 in) long at the base of the petioles. The flowers are purple, arranged in racemes of 5 to about 10 on a peduncle 1–2 mm (0.039–0.079 in) wide with broadly lance-shaped bracts about 2 mm (0.079 in) long at the base. The sepals are joined at the base, forming a tube about 2.0 mm (0.079 in) long with lobes shorter than the tube. The standard petal is 8–9 mm (0.31–0.35 in) long and 9–10 mm (0.35–0.39 in) wide, the wings 7–8 mm (0.28–0.31 in) long and the keel 6–8 mm (0.24–0.31 in) long and about 2.5 mm (0.098 in) deep.

== Taxonomy and naming ==
Swainsona extrajacens was first formally described in 1990 by Joy Thompson in the journal Telopea, from specimens collected on the far north-western plains of New South Wales in 1974. The specific epithet (extrajacens) means "remote from populated areas".

== Distribution ==
This species of pea grows in clay-loam floodplain in the north-western Corner of New South Wales and the north-eastern corner of South Australia.
