= Swainsona longicarinata =

Scientific classification
- Kingdom: Plantae
- Clade: Tracheophytes
- Clade: Angiosperms
- Clade: Eudicots
- Clade: Rosids
- Order: Fabales
- Family: Fabaceae
- Subfamily: Faboideae
- Genus: Swainsona
- Species: S. longicarinata

Binomial name
- Swainsona longicarinata Joy Thomps.

Synonyms
- Swainsona phacoides subsp. grandiflora (Benth.) A.T.Lee; Swainsona phacoides var. grandiflora Benth.

Species of plant

Swainsona longicarinata is a prostrate or ascending perennial herb in the pea family and is endemic to the far west of Western Australia. It has 5 to 11 variably-shaped leaflets, and racemes of about 7, usually purple flowers.

== Description ==
Swainsona longicarinata is a prostrate, rarely ascending perennial herb, or rarely an annual herb, that typically grows up to about 20 cm (7.9 in) tall. Its leaves are 20–70 mm (0.79–2.76 in) long with 5 to 11 variably-shaped leaflets, the side leaflets 5–10 mm (0.20–0.39 in) long and 1–6 mm (0.039–0.236 in) wide with stipules 2–10 mm (0.079–0.394 in) long at the base of the petioles. The flowers are arranged in racemes up to 200 mm (7.9 in) long with about 7 flowers on a peduncle 0.5–1.5 mm (0.020–0.059 in) wide, each flower 12–14 mm (0.47–0.55 in) long on a hairy pedicel about 2–3 mm (0.079–0.118 in) long. The sepals are joined at the base, forming a tube about 2 mm (0.079 in) long, the sepal lobes about the same length as the tube. The petals are purple, the standard petal about 11–12 mm (0.43–0.47 in) long and 12–15 mm (0.47–0.59 in) wide, the wings about 10 mm (0.39 in) long, and the keel 12–14 mm (0.47–0.55 in) long and 4–5 mm (0.16–0.20 in) deep. Flowering occurs from July to September and the fruit is elliptic, 10–30 mm (0.39–1.18 in) and 5–8 mm (0.20–0.31 in) wide.

== Taxonomy ==
Swainsona longicarinata was first formally described in 1993 by Joy Thompson in the journal Telopea from a specimen collected on Dirk Hartog Island by Alex George in 1972. The specific epithet (longicarinata) means "long keel".

== Distribution and habitat ==
This species of swainsona often grows on coastal calcareous dunes and flats, in the Yalgoo bioregion in the far west of Western Australia.
