= Swainsona longipilosa =

Conservation status
- Priority One — Poorly Known Taxa (DEC)

Scientific classification
- Kingdom: Plantae
- Clade: Tracheophytes
- Clade: Angiosperms
- Clade: Eudicots
- Clade: Rosids
- Order: Fabales
- Family: Fabaceae
- Subfamily: Faboideae
- Genus: Swainsona
- Species: S. longipilosa

Binomial name
- Swainsona longipilosa Joy Thomps.

Species of plant

Swainsona longipilosa is a small annual plant in the family pea and is endemic to a small area in the central west of Western Australia. It has about 5 egg-shaped leaflets with the narrower end toward the base, and racemes of up to 3, reddish purple flowers.

== Description ==
Swainsona longipilosa is an annual plant that typically grows to a height of about 4 cm (1.6 in). Its stems are about 1 mm (0.039 in) wide, densely softly-hairy and ribbed. The leaves are about 20 mm (0.79 in) long with about 5 egg-shaped leaflets with the narrower end towards the base, the side leaflets 5–8 mm (0.20–0.31 in) long and 2–3 mm (0.079–0.118 in) wide with stipules up to 7 mm (0.28 in) long at the base of the petioles. The flowers are arranged in racemes up to 10–50 mm (0.39–1.97 in) long with up to 3 flowers on a peduncle less than 0.5 mm (0.020 in) wide, each flower about 8 mm (0.31 in) long on a pedicel less than 1 mm (0.039 in) long. The sepals are joined at the base, forming a tube about 1 mm (0.039 in) long, the sepal lobes about the three times the length of the tube. The petals are reddish-purple, the standard petal about 6–8 mm (0.24–0.31 in) long and about 7 mm (0.28 in) wide, the wings 5–6 mm (0.20–0.24 in) long, and the keel 8–9 mm (0.31–0.35 in) long and 3–4 mm (0.12–0.16 in) deep. Flowering has been observed in August and the fruit is oblong, about 15 mm (0.59 in) and 3 mm (0.12 in) wide.

== Taxonomy ==
Swainsona longipilosa was first formally described in 1993 by Joy Thompson in the journal Telopea from a specimen collected in 1981. The specific epithet (longipilosa) means "long hair".

== Distribution and habitat ==
This species of swainsona is only known from two localities in Western Australia where it grows on a stony, exposed hilltop in Acacia woodland in the Carnarvon and Gascoyne bioregions.

== Conservation status ==
Swainsona longipilosa is listed as "Priority One" by the Government of Western Australia Department of Biodiversity, Conservation and Attractions, meaning that it is known from only one or a few locations where it is potentially at risk.
