= Swainsona minutiflora =

Scientific classification
- Kingdom: Plantae
- Clade: Tracheophytes
- Clade: Angiosperms
- Clade: Eudicots
- Clade: Rosids
- Order: Fabales
- Family: Fabaceae
- Subfamily: Faboideae
- Genus: Swainsona
- Species: S. minutiflora

Binomial name
- Swainsona minutiflora A.T.Lee

Species of legume

Swainsona minutiflora is a species of flowering plant in the family Fabaceae and is endemic to South Australia. It is a prostrate, herbaceous plant with imparipinnate leaves with 5 to 9 oblong or narrowly oblong leaflets with the narrower end towards the base, and racemes of 3 to 7 yellow or pinkish flowers.

== Description ==
Swainsona minutiflora is a prostrate herb with several stems mostly up to 5–10 cm (2.0–3.9 in) radiating from a tap root. Its leaves are imparipinnate, 22–55 mm (0.87–2.17 in) long with 5 to 9 oblong or narrowly oblong leaflets 6–8 mm (0.24–0.31 in) long and 2.0–2.5 mm (0.079–0.098 in) wide on a hairy petiole. There is a tapering linear to narrowly triangular stipule 2–4 mm (0.079–0.157 in) long at the base of the petiole. The flowers are arranged in racemes with 3 to 7 flowers on a peduncle mostly 40 mm (1.6 in) long, each flower 4–5 mm (0.16–0.20 in) long on a pedicel 1.5–2.0 mm (0.059–0.079 in) long. The sepals are 2.0–2.5 mm (0.079–0.098 in) long, the sepal lobes shorter than the tube. The petals are yellow, or pinkish, the standard petal about 4 mm (0.16 in) long and wide, the wings 4.0–4.5 mm (0.16–0.18 in) long, and the keel 4–5 mm (0.16–0.20 in) long and 1.0–1.5 mm (0.039–0.059 in) long and 1.0–1.5 mm (0.039–0.059 in) deep. Flowering has been observed in August and October and the fruit is 15–23 mm (0.59–0.91 in) long and 3 mm (0.12 in) wide containing about 8 more or less square seeds about 1.5 mm (0.059 in) long.

== Taxonomy and naming ==
Swainsona minutiflora was first formally described in 1948 by Alma Theodora Lee in Contributions from the New South Wales National Herbarium, from specimens collected by Max Koch in Mount Lyndhurst in 1899. The specific epithet (minutiflora) means "very small flowers".

== Distribution ==
This species of pea grows in the North-west, Lake Eyre and Flinders Ranges bioregions of South Australia.
