= Swainsona complanata =

Scientific classification
- Kingdom: Plantae
- Clade: Tracheophytes
- Clade: Angiosperms
- Clade: Eudicots
- Clade: Rosids
- Order: Fabales
- Family: Fabaceae
- Subfamily: Faboideae
- Genus: Swainsona
- Species: S. complanata

Binomial name
- Swainsona complanata Joy Thomps.

Species of plant

Swainsona complanata is a species of flowering plant in the family Fabaceae and is endemic to northern Western Australia. It is an erect, annual herb with imparipinnate leaves usually with up to 13 narrowly egg-shaped leaflets with the narrower end towards the base, and racemes of up to 20 mauve to maroon flowers.

== Description ==
Swainsona complanata is an erect, annual herb, usually with a single, rather stout stem arising from the tap root. Its leaves are imparipinnate, up to 70 mm (2.8 in) long, sometimes with stipules about 3 mm (0.12 in) long at the base. There are up to 13 narrowly egg-shaped leaflets with the narrower end towards the base, the leaflets about 15 mm (0.59 in) and 3–5 mm (0.12–0.20 in) wide. The flowers are mauve to maroon, arranged in racemes 50–100 mm (2.0–3.9 in) long of up to 20, each flower 4–7 mm (0.16–0.28 in) long on a peduncle 1.5–2.5 mm (0.059–0.098 in) long. The sepals are joined at the base, forming a tube about 15 mm (0.59 in) long with the sepal lobes much smaller than the sepal tube. The standard petal is about 7 mm (0.28 in) long, the wings about 6 mm (0.24 in) long, and the keel 7 mm (0.28 in) long. Flowering occurs from July to October, and the fruit is a very broadly elliptic pod 10–13 mm (0.39–0.51 in) long with the remains of the style about 2.5 mm (0.098 in) long.

== Taxonomy and naming ==
Swainsona complanata was first formally described in 1990 by Joy Thompson in the journal Telopea, from a specimen collected by Raymond Jeffrey Cranfield in 1981. The specific epithet (complanata) means "flattened", referring to the strongly flattened fruit of this species.

== Distribution and habitat ==
This species grows in sand, loam or stony soils in the Carnarvon, Gascoyne and Pilbara bioregions of northern Western Australia.
