= Swainsona pyrophila =

Scientific classification
- Kingdom: Plantae
- Clade: Tracheophytes
- Clade: Angiosperms
- Clade: Eudicots
- Clade: Rosids
- Order: Fabales
- Family: Fabaceae
- Subfamily: Faboideae
- Genus: Swainsona
- Species: S. pyrophila

Binomial name
- Swainsona pyrophila Joy Thomps.

Species of legume

Swainsona pyrophila, commonly known as yellow Swainson-pea or yellow Darling pea, is a species of flowering plant in the family Fabaceae and is endemic to southern continental Australia. It is an erect or spreading annual or short-lived perennial plant with imparipinnate leaves with 15 to 19, mostly egg-shaped leaflets with the narrower end towards the base, and racemes of 15 to about 20 yellow flowers.

== Description ==
Swainsona pyrophila is an erect or spreading, perennial or short-lived annual plant, that typically grows to a height of up to 1 m (3 ft 3 in) and has mostly glabrous stems. The leaves are imparipinnate, mostly 50–150 mm (2.0–5.9 in) long with 15 to 19 egg-shaped leaflets with the narrower end towards the base, the leaflets mostly 10–25 mm (0.39–0.98 in) long and 4–12 mm (0.16–0.47 in) wide. There are stipules mostly 4–7 mm (0.16–0.28 in) long at the base of the petioles. The flowers are arranged in racemes 150–250 mm (5.9–9.8 in) long of 15 to about 20, on a peduncle 1–2 mm (0.039–0.079 in) wide, each flower about 10 mm (0.39 in) long. The sepals are joined at the base, forming a tube 1.5–2.0 mm (0.059–0.079 in) long with lobes shorter than the sepal tube. The petals are yellow, the standard petal about 7–10 mm (0.28–0.39 in) long and wide, the wings about 8 mm (0.31 in) long, and the keel 7–10 mm (0.28–0.39 in) long and about 5 mm (0.20 in) deep. Flowering mainly occurs from September to December and the fruit is a crescent-shaped to elliptic pod 20–30 mm (0.79–1.18 in) long with the remains of the style about 3 mm (0.12 in) long.

== Taxonomy and naming ==
Swainsona pyrophila was first formally described in 1991 by Joy Thompson in the journal Telopea. The specific epithet (pyrophila) means "fire-loving", referring to its association with recently burny areas.

== Distribution and habitat ==
Swainsona pyrophila grows in mallee scrub, usually only after fire, and occurs in the eastern half of South Australia, and in adjacent areas of the Victoria and New South Wales.
