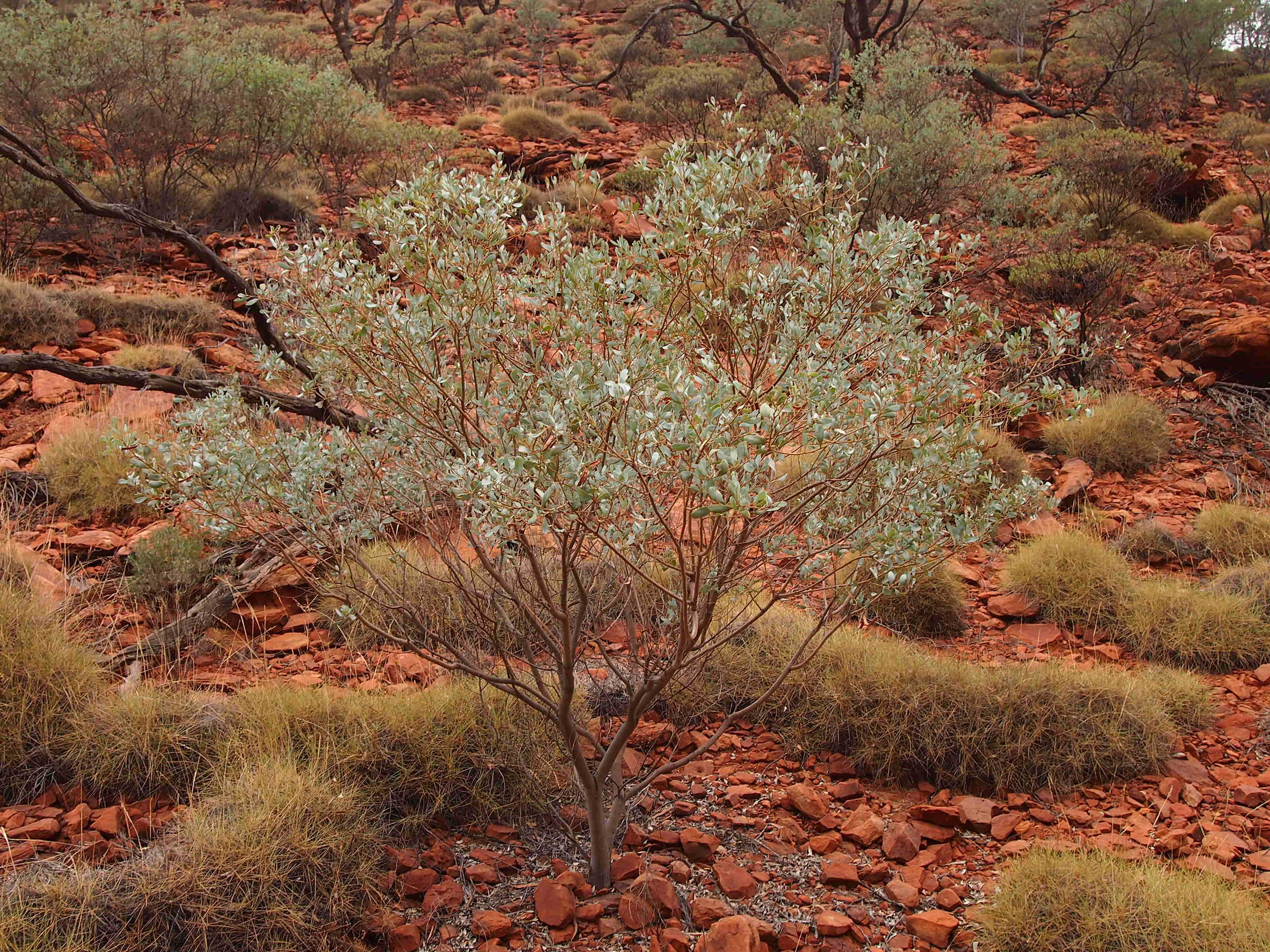

Scientific classification
- Kingdom: Plantae
- Clade: Tracheophytes
- Clade: Angiosperms
- Clade: Eudicots
- Clade: Rosids
- Order: Fabales
- Family: Fabaceae
- Subfamily: Caesalpinioideae
- Clade: Mimosoid clade
- Genus: Acacia
- Species: A. bivenosa

Binomial name
- Acacia bivenosa DC.
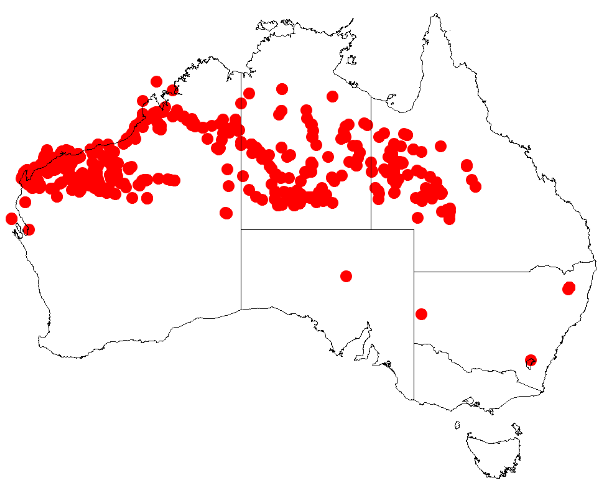
- Occurrence data from AVH

Synonyms
- Acacia binervosa DC. orth. var.; Acacia bivenosa DC. subsp. bivenosa; Acacia bivenosa DC. var. bivenosa; Acacia bivenosa var. borealis Hochr.; Acacia elliptica A.Cunn. ex Benth.; Racosperma bivenosum (DC.) Pedley

= Acacia bivenosa =

Two nerved wattle

Species of shrub

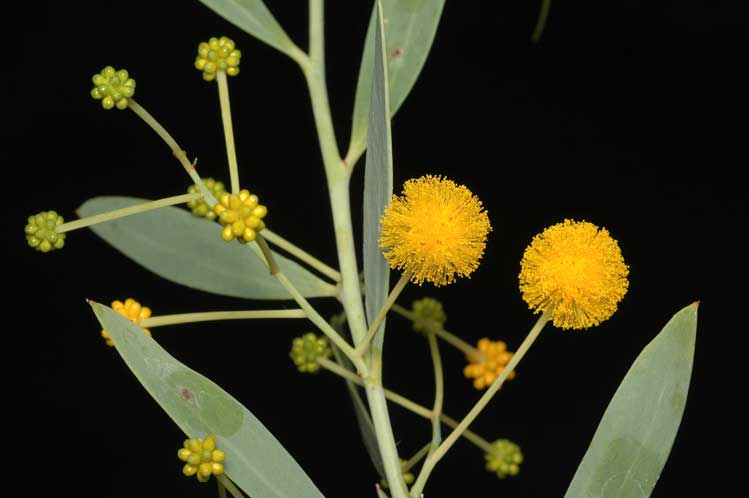
Foliage and flowers

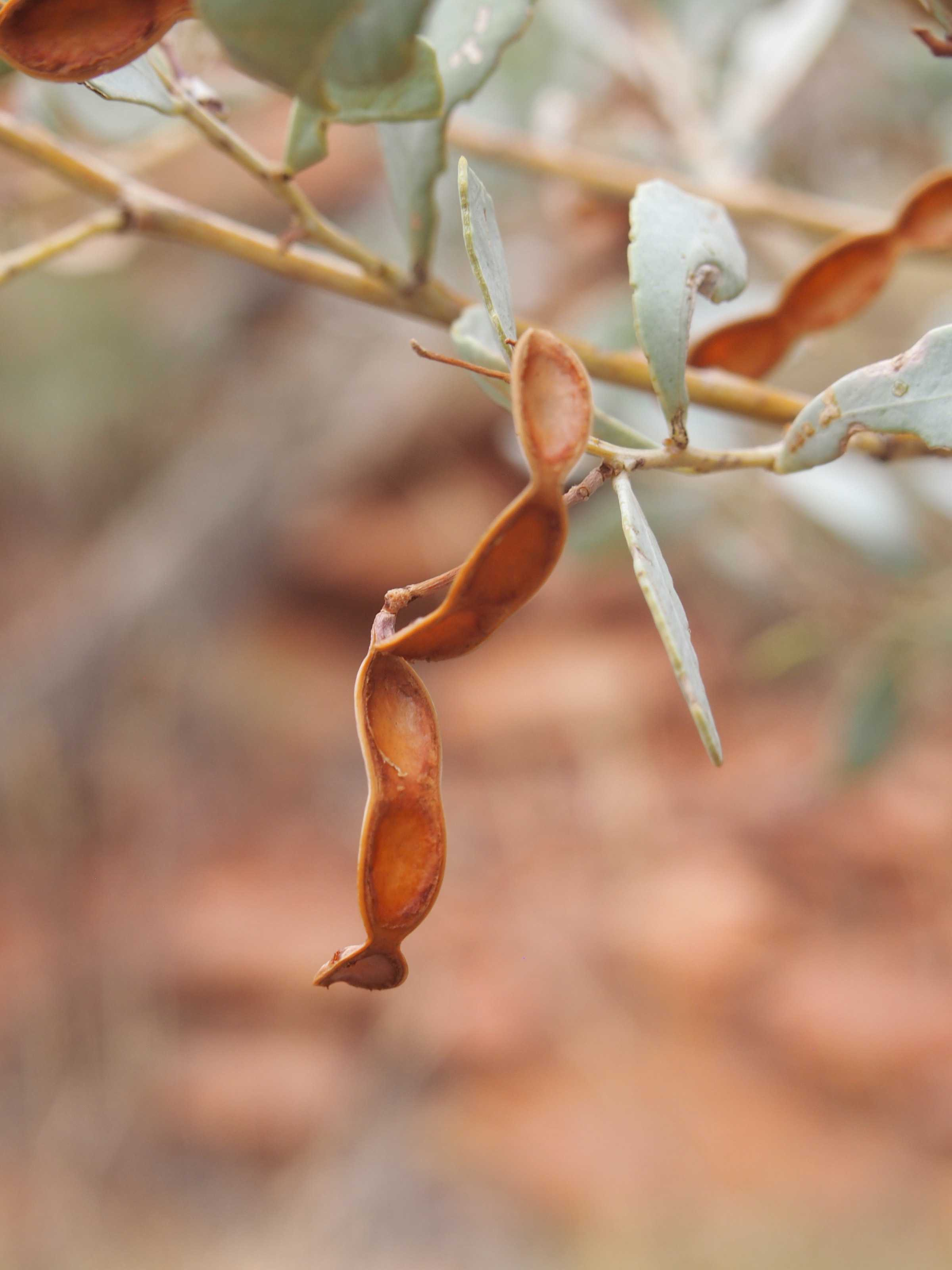
Seed pods

Acacia bivenosa, commonly known as two-nerved wattle, two-veined wattle, hill umbrella bush, dune wattle or Cable Beach wattle is a species of flowering plant in the family Fabaceae and is endemic to northern Australia. It is a bushy, rounded or spreading shrub with narrowly elliptic, oblong or egg-shaped to lance-shaped phyllodes, rich golden-yellow flowers in spherical heads, and erect, crust-like to more or less woody pods up to 80 mm (3.1 in) long.

Other names for this species are derived from several Indigenous languages.

== Description ==
Acacia bivenosa is a glabrous, bushy, rounded or spreading shrub that typically grows to 1–3 m (3 ft 3 in – 9 ft 10 in) high and 3 m (9.8 ft) wide. The bark is smooth and light grey. Its phyllodes are narrowly elliptic, oblong or egg-shaped to lance-shaped phyllodes with the narrower end towards the base, mostly 20–55 mm (0.79–2.17 in) long and 6–20 mm (0.24–0.79 in) wide. The flowers are borne in six or seven spherical heads in racemes on a peduncles 15–35 mm (0.59–1.38 in) long. Each head is about 10 mm (0.39 in) in diameter and has mostly 16 to 23 rich golden-yellow. Flowering occurs between May and October, mostly between July and August, flowers It produces yellow flowers from April to November. The simple inflorescences have globular heads with a diameter of about 10 mm (0.39 in) containing 16 to 32 rich golden flowers. The seed pods are more or less erect, up to 80 mm (3.1 in) long and 5–8 mm (0.20–0.31 in) wide and crust like to more or less woody, somewhat like a string of beads, containing glossy, dark brown to black seeds with a red or orange aril.

== Taxonomy and naming ==
Acacia bivenosa was first formally described in 1825 by the botanist Augustin Pyramus de Candolle in his Prodromus Systematis Naturalis Regni Vegetabilis. The specific epithet (bivenosa) means 'full of two veins', referring to the phyllodes.

A group of Acacia known as the A. bivenosa group of plants with similar features contains 12 species including; A. ampliceps, A. bivenosa, A. cupularis, A. didyma, A. ligulata, A. rostellifera, A. salicina, A. sclerosperma, A. startii, A. telmica, A. tysonii and A. xanthina.

The Kurrama peoples know the plant as murrurpa, murrurbaor and morama, the Panyjima call it mururru, the Nyangumarta mururr and the Jaru as burlmany.

== Distribution and habitat ==
Two-nerved wattle is widespread in arid areas of northern Australia. It is common in the Carnarvon, Central Kimberley, Central Ranges, Dampierland, Gascoyne, Great Sandy Desert, Little Sandy Desert, Ord Victoria Plain, Pilbara, Tanami and Yalgoobio bioregions of Western Australia and the Northern Territory. It is also found in western Queensland, north of 25°S, with an outlier on Dorre Island, Shark Bay, Western Australia. It grows in various kinds of soils, including coastal sand, on rocky hills and gullies, in shrubland and open woodland, and is often associated with spinifex.

== Conservation status ==
Acacia bivenosa is listed as of "least concern" by the Queensland Government Department of Environment and Science.

== Uses ==
The bush can be heavily grazed by stock, especially as a seedling. Indigenous Australians used to find edible grubs from around the roots. It is often used in land rehabilitation as a primary colonizer.

== See also ==
- List of Acacia species
