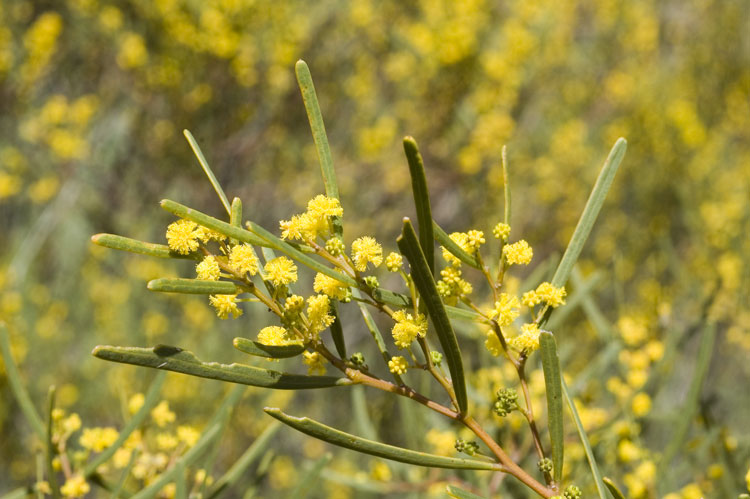

Scientific classification
- Kingdom: Plantae
- Clade: Tracheophytes
- Clade: Angiosperms
- Clade: Eudicots
- Clade: Rosids
- Order: Fabales
- Family: Fabaceae
- Subfamily: Caesalpinioideae
- Clade: Mimosoid clade
- Genus: Acacia
- Species: A. cupularis

Binomial name
- Acacia cupularis Domin

Synonyms
- List: Acacia bivenosa subsp. wayi (Maiden) Pedley; Acacia ligulata var. minor (F.Muell.) Pedley; Acacia salicina var. minor F.Muell.; Acacia salicina var. wayae Maiden orth. var.; Acacia salicina var. wayi Maiden; Acacia saligna (Labill.) H.L.Wendl. p.p.; Racosperma ligulatum var. minus (F.Muell.) Pedley; Acacia ligulata auct. non A.Cunn. ex Benth.: Whibley, D.J.E. in Jessop, J.P. & Toelken, H.R. (ed.) (1986) p.p.; Acacia ramosissima auct. non Benth.: Meisner, C.D.F. in Lehmann, J.G.C. (ed.) (1844)

= Acacia cupularis =

Coastal umbrella bush

Species of plant

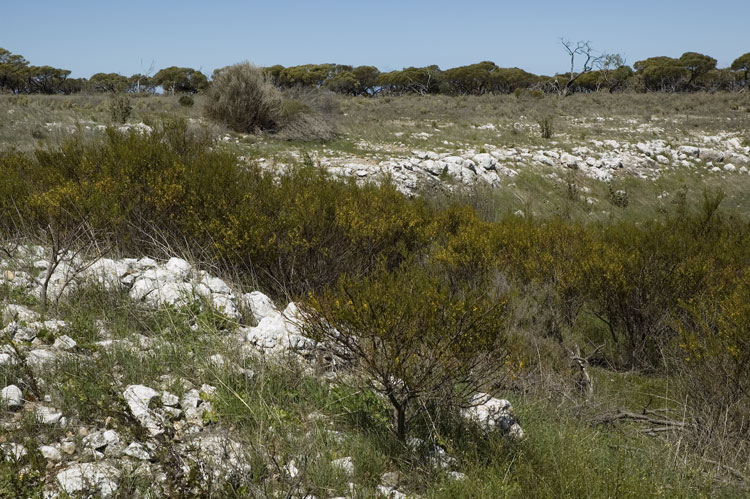
Habit

Acacia cupularis, commonly known as the coastal umbrella bush, is a species of flowering plant in the family Fabaceae and is endemic to the south of continental Australia. It is an open to somewhat dense shrub with often dark reddish brown branchlets, linear, straight phyllodes, spherical heads of golden yellow flowers and more or less erect, crusty pods, appearing somewhat like a string of beads.

== Description ==
Acacia cupularis is a glabrous, open shrub that typically grows to a height of 1–2.5 m (3 ft 3 in – 8 ft 2 in) and 2.5 m (8 ft 2 in) wide. The branchlets are often dark red-brown and covered with a white, powdery bloom. The phyllodes are ascending to erect, straight, narrowly linear, 30–80 mm (1.2–3.1 in) long, 1–4 mm (0.039–0.157 in) wide and thick with two or three glands, the lower gland 3–14 mm (0.12–0.55 in) above the base of the phyllode. The flowers are borne in spherical heads in two or three racemes 1–7 mm (0.039–0.276 in) long on peduncles 2–6 mm (0.079–0.236 in) long, each head with 16 to 22 golden yellow flowers. Flowering occurs from July to December, and the pods are more or less erect, somewhat resembling a string of beads, up to 70 mm (2.8 in) long, 4–5 mm (0.16–0.20 in) wide, crusty and dark brown. The seeds are oblong, dull, light brown and 3–5 mm (0.12–0.20 in) long with an orange to scarlet aril.

== Taxonomy ==
Acacia cupularis was first formally described in 1923 by the botanist Karel Domin in Vestnik Kralovske Ceske Spolecnosti Nauk, Trida Matematiko-Prirodevedecke from specimens collected by Arthur Dorrien-Smith. The specific epithet (cupularis) means 'resembling a cup', referring to the shape of the pods.

This species is a member of the Acacia bivenosa group of wattles and is similar in appearance to A. maxwellii, A. crassiuscula and A. anceps x A. nematophylla.

== Distribution ==
This species of wattle is widespread in coastal and near-coastal areas from near Albany in southern Western Australia through South Australia to the Victorian boarder and inland as far as Dimboola in western Victoria and Three Springs in Western Australia. Its grows in sand or in loam or sandy clay in mallee communities.

== Conservation status ==
Acacia cupularis is listed as critically endangered under the Victoria Government Flora and Fauna Guarantee Act 1988.

== See also ==
- List of Acacia species
