= Swainsona forrestii =

Scientific classification
- Kingdom: Plantae
- Clade: Tracheophytes
- Clade: Angiosperms
- Clade: Eudicots
- Clade: Rosids
- Order: Fabales
- Family: Fabaceae
- Subfamily: Faboideae
- Genus: Swainsona
- Species: S. forrestii

Binomial name
- Swainsona forrestii F.Muell. ex A.T.Lee

Synonyms
- Swainsona forrestii F.Muell. nom. inval., nom. nud.

Species of legume

Swainsona forrestii is a species of flowering plant in the family Fabaceae and is endemic to the central northern Western Australia. It is an erect or spreading, single-stemmed annual herb, with imparipinnate leaves with about 13 to 17 narrowly egg-shaped or narrowly ellipitic leaflets, and racemes of dark brownish red to purple or pink flowers in racemes of 30 or more.

== Description ==
Swainsona forrestii is an erect or spreading, single-stemmed annual herb, that typically grows to a height of about 1 m (3 ft 3 in) and has densely hairy young growth. The leaves are imparipinnate, mostly 50–100 mm (2.0–3.9 in) long with about 13 to 17 narrowly egg-shaped or narrowly elliptic leaflets, 20–40 mm (0.79–1.57 in) long and 5–10 mm (0.20–0.39 in) wide with variably shaped stipules up to 7 mm (0.28 in) long at the base of the petioles. The flowers are dark brownish red to purple or pink, arranged in racemes of 30 or more and up to 150 mm (5.9 in) or even 300 mm (12 in) long, on a peduncle 1.0–2.5 mm (0.039–0.098 in) long. The sepals are softly-hairy, joined at the base to form a tube, with very narrow teeth up to twice as long as the tube. The standard petal is 8–10 mm (0.31–0.39 in) long and almost as wide, the wings 7–9 mm (0.28–0.35 in) long and the keel about 10 mm (0.39 in) long and 3 mm (0.12 in) deep. Flowering usually occurs from August to October, and the fruit is a broadly elliptic pod mostly 8–10 mm (0.31–0.39 in) long on a stalk 2–3 mm (0.079–0.118 in) long, with the remains of the strongly curved style 4–7 mm (0.16–0.28 in) long.

== Taxonomy and naming ==
Swainsona forrestii was first formally described in 1948 by Alma Theodora Lee in Contributions from the New South Wales National Herbarium. The specific epithet (forrestii) honours John Forrest.

== Distribution ==
This species of pea usually grows in often stoney soils near creek banks or on floodplains in the Carnarvon, Gascoyne and Pilbara bioregions of central northern Western Australia.
