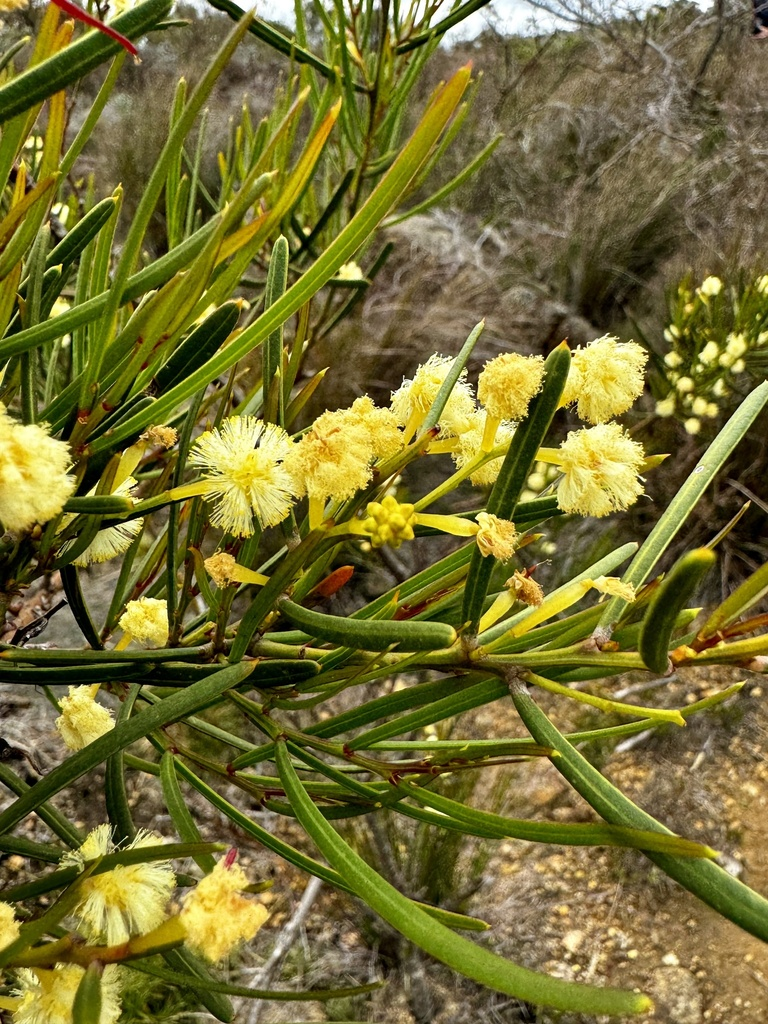

Scientific classification
- Kingdom: Plantae
- Clade: Tracheophytes
- Clade: Angiosperms
- Clade: Eudicots
- Clade: Rosids
- Order: Fabales
- Family: Fabaceae
- Subfamily: Caesalpinioideae
- Clade: Mimosoid clade
- Genus: Acacia
- Species: A. crassiuscula

Binomial name
- Acacia crassiuscula H.L.Wendl.
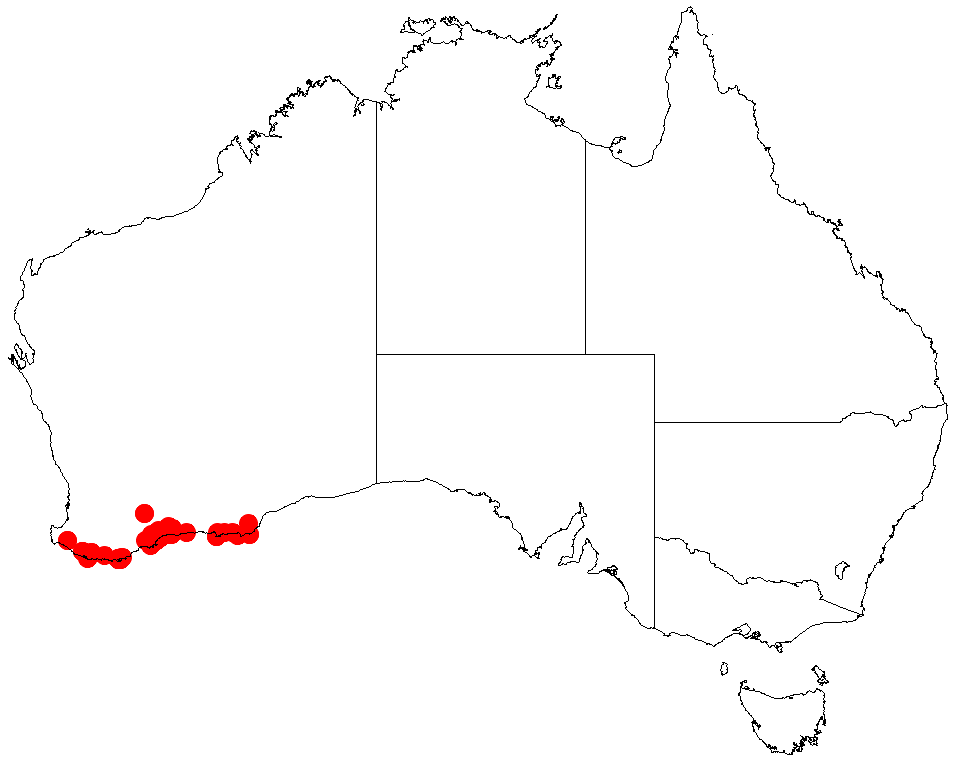
- Occurrence data from AVH

Synonyms
- Acacia crassiuscula H.L.Wendl. var. crassiuscula; Acacia pycnophylla Benth.; Acacia pycnophylla var. angustifolia Benth.; Acacia pycnophylla Benth. var. pycnophylla; Acacia sieberi Steud. nom. inval., pro syn.; Racosperma crassiusculum (H.L.Wendl.) Pedley

= Acacia crassiuscula =

Species of legume

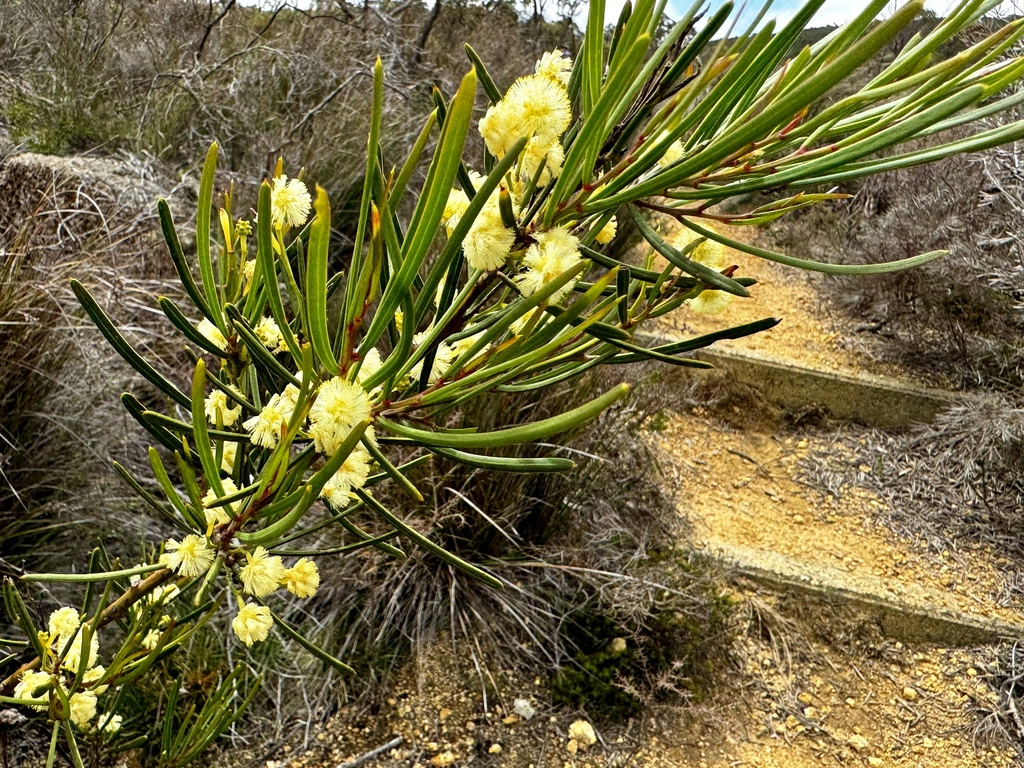
Habit in Mount Lindesay National Park

Acacia crassiuscula is a species of flowering plant in the family Fabaceae and is endemic to the south-west of Western Australia. It is an erect, often spindly or straggly shrub with linear, somewhat rigid phyllodes, spherical heads of cream-coloured flowers and linear, thinly leathery pods.

== Description ==
Acacia crassiuscula is an erect, often spindly shrub that typically grows to a height of 1–2.5 m (3 ft 3 in – 8 ft 2 in) and has glabrous branchlets. Its phyllodes are ascending to erect, linear, straight to slightly curved, 50–100 mm (2.0–3.9 in) long and 2–3 mm (0.079–0.118 in) wide, somewhat rigid, dark green, glabrous and more or less sharply pointed. The midrib of the phyllode is rather prominent, and there is a gland 2–8 mm (0.079–0.315 in) from the base of the phyllode. The flowers are borne in three to eight spherical heads in racemes 10–60 mm (0.39–2.36 in) long. The heads are on a pedicel 4–8 mm (0.16–0.31 in) long, each head 5.5–6.0 mm (0.22–0.24 in) long with 13 to 20 cream-coloured flowers. Flowering occurs from about May to October, and the pods are linear, thinly leathery and glabrous, up to 100 mm (3.9 in) long and 4–5 mm (0.16–0.20 in) wide and shallowly constricted between the seeds. The seeds are oblong to elliptic, 4.5–4.8 mm (0.18–0.19 in) long, semi glossy and black with a thick aril on the end.

== Taxonomy ==
Acacia crassiuscula was first formally described in 1820 by Heinrich Wendland in his Commentatio de Acaciis aphyllis. The specific epithet (crassiuscula) means 'rather thick'.

Acacia crassiuscula resembles A. cupularis and A. harveyi. The phyllodes have the same shape and size as those of A. euthyphylla.

== Distribution and habitat ==
This species of wattle is native to an area along the south coast of Western Australia between Albany and Cape Arid National Park with two disjunct populations north and north-west of Walpole. It grows in sand in scrub mallee and heath in the Esperance Plains, Jarrah Forest and Warren bioregions of Western Australia.

== Conservation status ==
Acacia crassiuscula is listed as "not threatened" by the Government of Western Australia Department of Biodiversity, Conservation and Attractions.

== See also ==
- List of Acacia species
