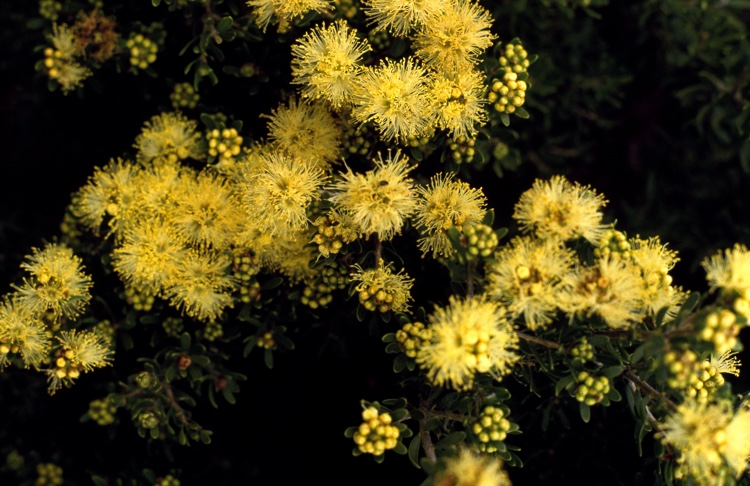

Scientific classification
- Kingdom: Plantae
- Clade: Tracheophytes
- Clade: Angiosperms
- Clade: Eudicots
- Clade: Rosids
- Order: Myrtales
- Family: Myrtaceae
- Genus: Melaleuca
- Species: M. leiopyxis

Binomial name
- Melaleuca leiopyxis F.Muell. ex Benth.

Synonyms
- Myrtoleucodendron leiopyxe (F.Muell. ex Benth.) Kuntze

= Melaleuca leiopyxis =

Species of shrub

Melaleuca leiopyxis is a shrub in the myrtle family, Myrtaceae and is endemic to an area near the west coast of Western Australia. It has bright yellow flowers and is very similar to Melaleuca depressa. The ranges of the two species overlap making it difficult to distinguish between them.

== Description ==
Melaleuca leiopyxis is a low, dense, ground hugging shrub to about 50 cm (20 in) or sometimes a much more erect shrub to 3 m (10 ft). Its leaves are arranged alternately, have a thin covering of soft hairs and are narrow oval to elliptical in shape, with a blunt to slightly pointed tip.

The flowers are arranged in heads up to 25 mm (1 in) in diameter at or near the ends of the branches, with 3 to 4 groups of flowers, 3 flowers in each group. The flowers mainly appear during September and October and are bright yellow, turning brown with age. The stamens are arranged in bundles of five around the flower, with 8 to 14 stamens in each bundle. The cup-shaped base of the flower, the hypanthium is 2–3 mm (0.08–0.1 in) long and covered with silky hairs. The fruit are woody capsules arranged in irregular groups, each capsule 4–7 mm (0.2–0.3 in) long, 5 mm (0.2 in) in diameter and cup-shaped.

== Taxonomy and naming ==
Melaleuca leiopyxis was first formally described in 1867 by George Bentham in Flora Australiensis. The specific epithet (leiopyxis) is derived from Greek words meaning "smooth" or "bald", and "box", referring to the smooth fruit.

== Distribution and habitat ==
Melaleuca leiopyxis occurs in the Kalbarri - Shark Bay area in the Carnarvon, Geraldton Sandplains and Yalgoo biogeographic regions. It grows in red sand on sand dunes and limestone hills.

== Conservation status ==
Melaleuca leiopyxis is listed as not threatened by the Government of Western Australia Department of Parks and Wildlife.

== Use in horticulture ==
This melaleuca is rarely cultivated although it has grown successfully in Adelaide. It would probably be an excellent plant to trial in exposed coastal gardens.
