= Carnarvon xeric shrublands =

Terrestrial ecoregion in Western Australia

Coordinates: 22°28′30″S 114°18′58″E

Carnarvon xeric shrublands Carnarvon bioregion
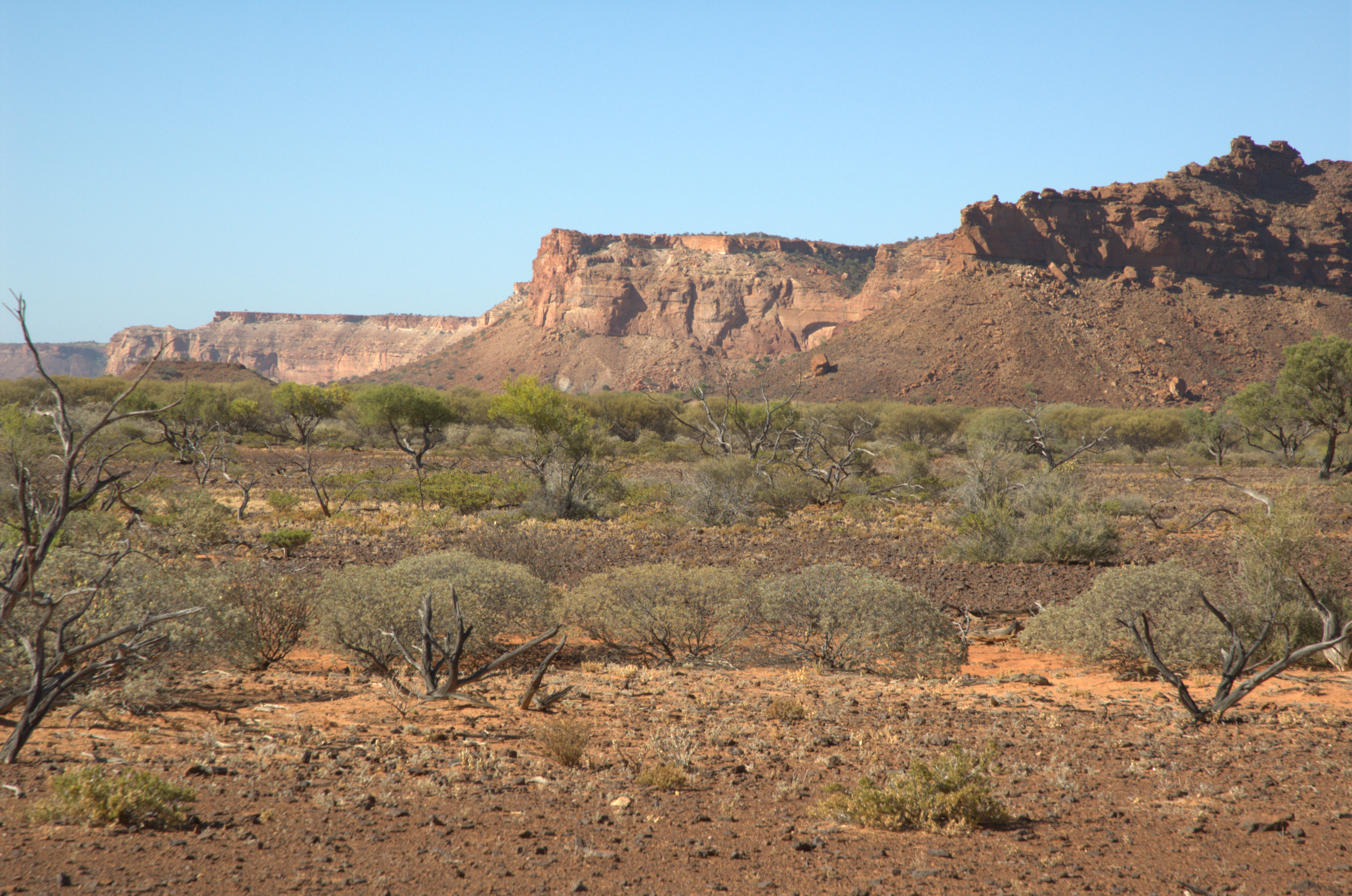
- Sandstone plateau in Kennedy Range National Park

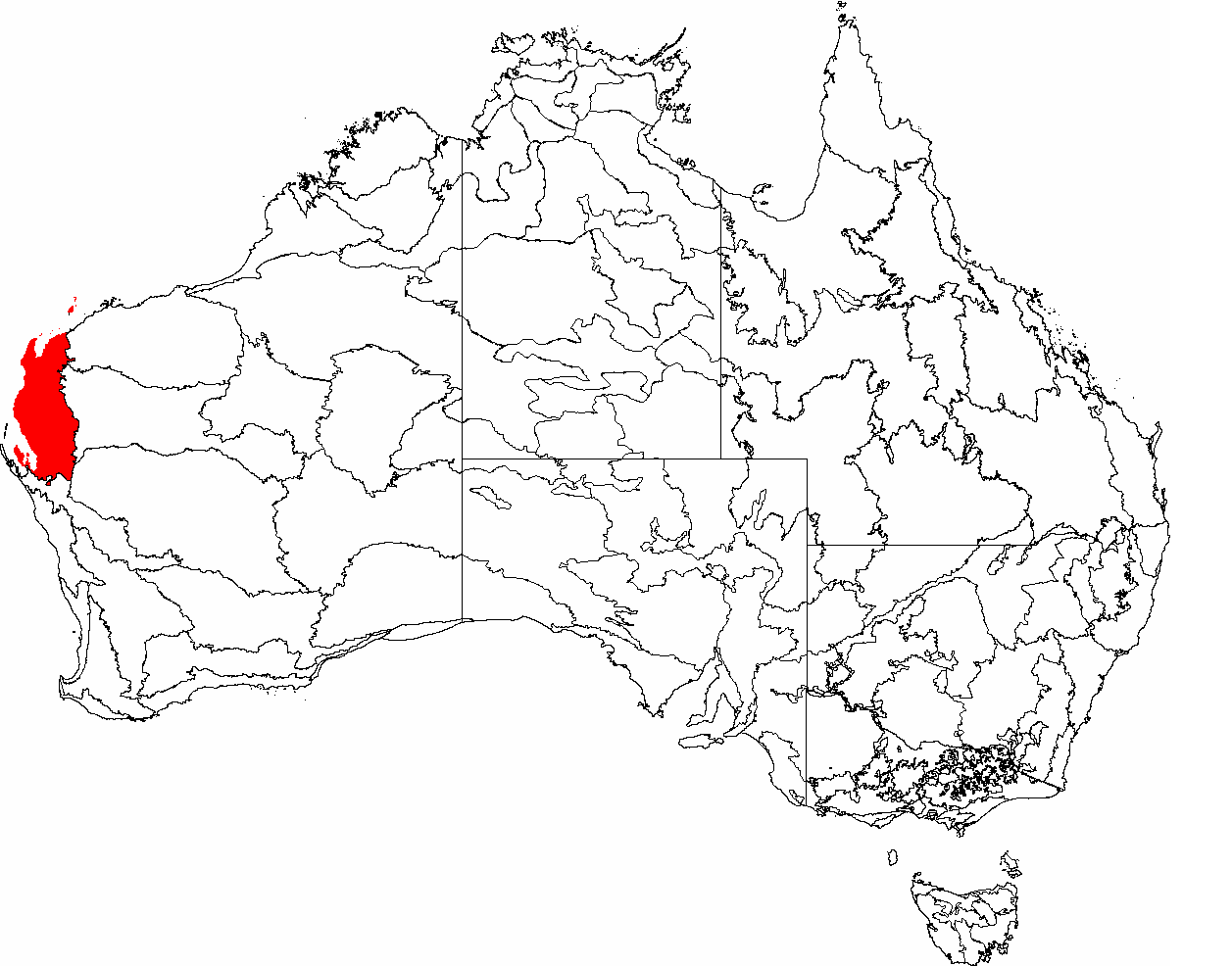
- Map of IBRA bioregions, with Carnarvon in red

Ecology
- Realm: Australasian
- Biome: deserts and xeric shrublands
- Borders: Pilbara shrublands; Southwest Australia savanna, Western Australian mulga shrublands

Geography
- Area: 83,534 km^{2} (32,253 sq mi)
- Country: Australia
- States: Western Australia

Conservation
- Conservation status: Critical/endangered
- Protected: 4,025 km² (5%)

The Carnarvon xeric shrublands is a deserts and xeric shrublands ecoregion of Western Australia. The ecoregion is coterminous with the Carnarvon Interim Biogeographic Regionalisation for Australia (IBRA) bioregion.

== Location and description ==
The ecoregion covers an area of 90,500 square kilometres (34,900 sq mi) from the bounded by the Indian Ocean to the west from the Peron Peninsula in Shark Bay up to the North West Cape. The Pilbara shrublands lie to the northeast, the Western Australian mulga shrublands to the east, and the Southwest Australia savanna to the south. The region is named for the coastal town of Carnarvon and includes a number of coastal towns and tourist resorts.

The terrain is generally low, and the vegetation varies with the underlying geology, which consists mostly of recent alluvial, aeolian, and marine sediments over cretaceous strata. This is a very dry region with less than 250 millimetres (9.8 in) of rainfall per year.

The ecoregion covers the on-shore portion of the Carnarvon Basin, a physiographic province of the larger West Australian Shield division.

=== Sub-regions ===
The Carnarvon bioregion has two sub-regions:

- Wooramel, which is a significant part of the Shark Bay World Heritage area
- Cape Range

== Flora ==
Low samphire and saltbush shrublands cover the saline alluvial plains, snakewood (Acacia xiphophylla) scrublands cover the clay flats, Bowgada (Acacia ramulosa) low woodland covers sandy ridges and plains, red sand dune fields are interspersed or overlain with tree to shrub steppe over hummock grasslands, and Acacia startii/A. bivenosa shrublands cover limestone outcrops in the north. Other trees in the area include limestone wattle (Acacia sclerosperma) with an undergrowth of dead finish (Acacia tetragonophylla). The sheltered embayments and extensive tidal flats along the coast support mangroves.

== Fauna ==
Wildlife of the area includes birds such as the western grasswren and the red-tailed black cockatoo. This is also the area where it is possible that there may be a surviving population of the lesser stick-nest rat which is thought to be extinct.

== Protected areas ==
Protected areas in the ecoregion include Cape Range National Park, Francois Peron National Park and Kennedy Range National Park.
