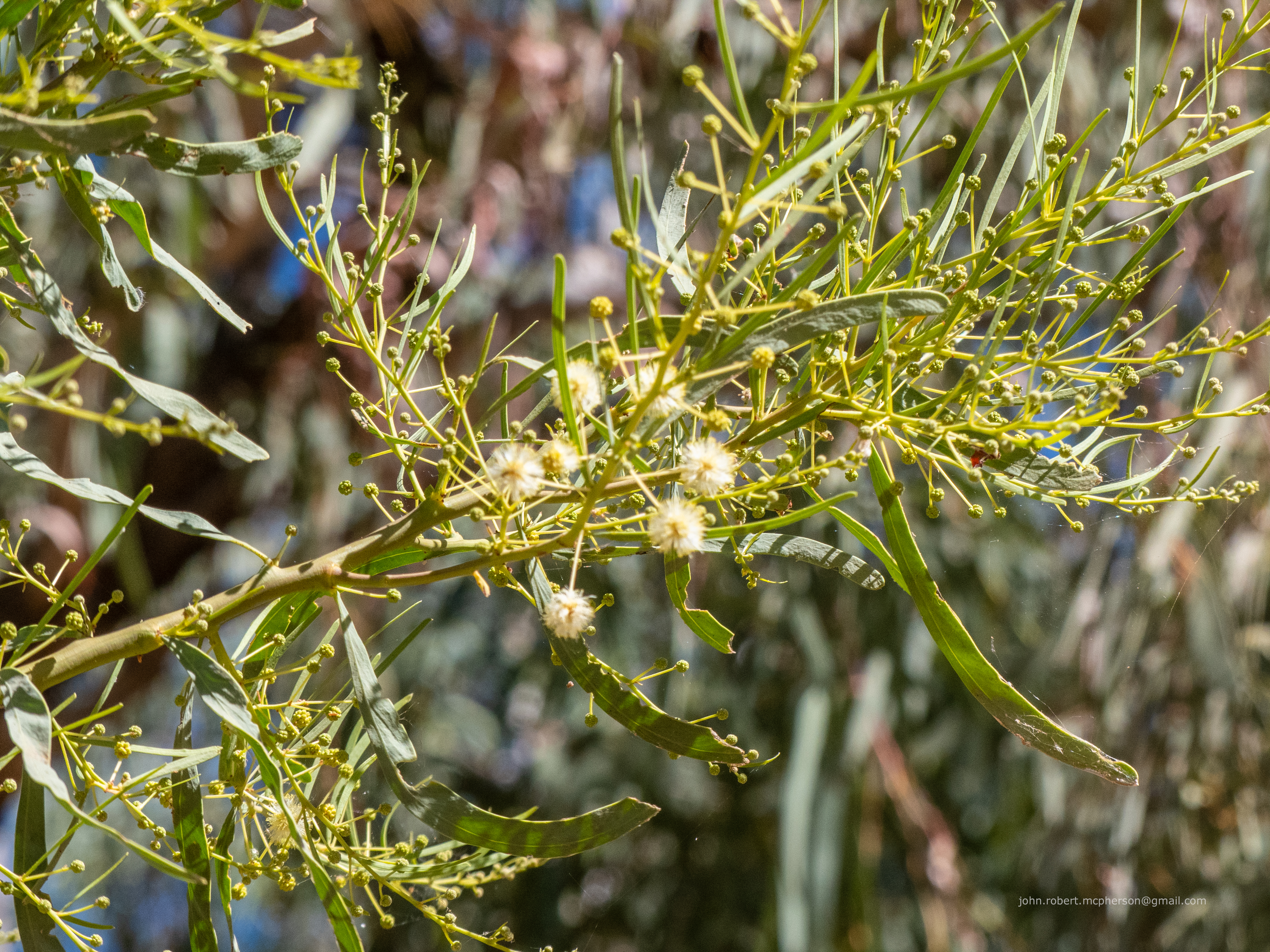
- Near Boulia, Queensland

Scientific classification
- Kingdom: Plantae
- Clade: Embryophytes
- Clade: Tracheophytes
- Clade: Spermatophytes
- Clade: Angiosperms
- Clade: Eudicots
- Clade: Rosids
- Order: Fabales
- Family: Fabaceae
- Subfamily: Caesalpinioideae
- Clade: Mimosoid clade
- Genus: Acacia
- Species: A. salicina

Binomial name
- Acacia salicina Lindl.
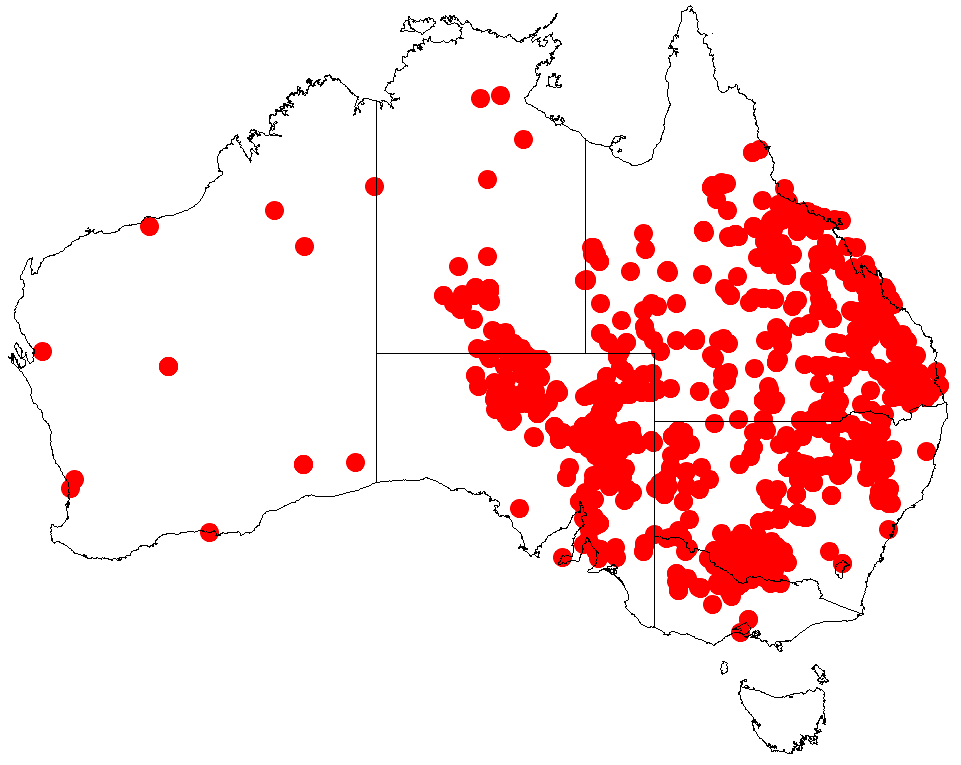
- Occurrence data from AVH

Synonyms
- Acacia salicina Lindl. var. typica Domin; Acacia salicina Lindl. var. varians (Benth.)Benth.; Acacia salix-tristis F.Muell.; Acacia varians Benth.; Racosperma salicinum (Lindl.) Pedley

= Acacia salicina =

Species of plant

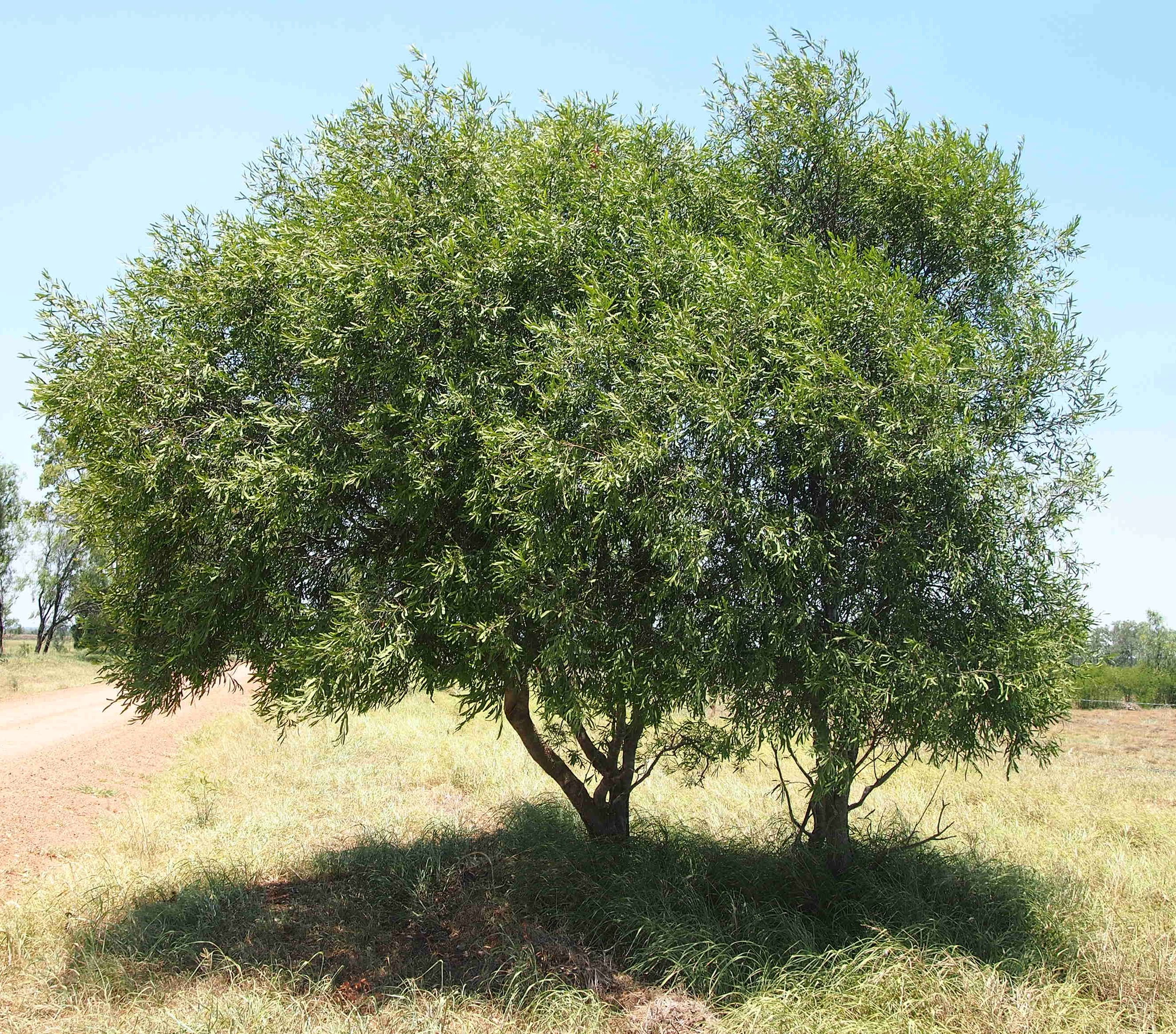
Habit

Acacia salicina is a thornless species of Acacia native to Australia. It is a large shrub or small evergreen tree growing up to 13.7 m (45 ft) tall. It is a fast grower, dropping lots of leaf litter, with a life span of about 10–50 years. In its native range, A. salicina flowers from February to June. In the Northern Hemisphere, A. salicina flowers primarily from October to January and the seed pods are often visible from April to July. The tree's seeds are shiny, black and have a crimson appendage-like aril. A. salicina is "closely related" to Acacia ligulata and Acacia bivenosa.

== Naming ==
The specific epithet salicina refers to its pendulous, willow-like (genus Salix) habit. Common names include cooba, native willow, willow wattle, Broughton willow, sally wattle, black sallee and black wattle. The Wiradjuri people of New South Wales use the name Guba. The 1889 book, The Useful Native Plants of Australia, records that common names included native willow and Broughton willow near the Broughton River in South Australia. It also records it was called Cooba or Kooba by Indigenous people in Western New South Wales and Motherumba by those on the Castlereagh River, New South Wales.

== Description ==
Acacia salicina is an erect or spreading shrub or tree 3–10 metres high, sometimes to 20 m, which often suckers freely. The bark is finely fissured and brownish. The branchlets are pendent, angled or flattened towards the apices, and glabrous. The phyllodes are pendent, narrowly elliptic to narrowly oblanceolate, straight or slightly curved, usually 5–16.5 cm long and 5–12 mm wide and glabrous. The phyllodes have a prominent midvein and are penniveined with a mucro at the apex. They have 2–5 small glands along the margin and the pulvinus is 1–3 mm long. There are usually 1-8 inflorescences in an axillary raceme with axis 0.5–6 cm long. The peduncles are 4–15 mm long and glabrous. The flower heads are globose, 15–30-flowered, 7–10 mm in diameter, and pale yellow to white. The seed pods are straight or slightly curved, roughly flat, straight-sided to irregularly constricted between the seeds, 3–12 cm long and 7–13 mm wide. They are woody and slightly longitudinally wrinkled when dry. The seeds are longitudinal and glabrous. The funicle is expanded with 2–4 folds towards the seed, and scarlet to orange.

== Chemical compounds ==
=== Wood ===
- (−)-7,8,3',4'-tetrahydroxyflavanone
- 7,8,3',4'-tetrahydroxydihydroflavonol
- 7,8,3',4'-tetrahydroxyflavonol

== Natural growing conditions ==
Acacia salicina is found throughout Australia, growing in regions receiving in excess of 1500mm annually in northern Queensland and as low as 100mm annually in central Australia. Its natural altitude range is from 50-300m above sea level. It does well in full sun exposure and tolerates frosts down to -6.7 deg. C (20 deg. F).

== Uses ==
- Erosion management: Acacia salicina can be used to help stabilize riverbanks and other areas.
- Fodder: The tree's foliage and seed pods are important fodder for livestock during dry periods, since the tree can withstand drought quite well. Its foliage and pods compare quite poorly to other fodders with regard to digestibility by livestock. This affects its available nutritional value. The 1889 book The Useful Native Plants of Australia records that "The leaves are eaten by stock. This is another tree which is rapidly becoming scarce, owing to the partiality of stock to it."
- Food: The seeds are edible.
- Landscaping: A. salicina is excellent for landscaping in dry areas.
- Tannin: The bark has a high tannin content.
- Wood: The wood is very hard and it is used in making fine furniture. At one time, the tree's wood was used in the manufacture of axles for wagon wheels. A. salicina's wood burns well and makes good fuel. Its calorific content is 18900kJ/kg dry mass. The tree produces seed and timber for woodworking in as little as five years after planting.
- Other uses: The bark has been traditionally put to use by Indigenous Australians as a toxin for fishing. The leaves of A. salicina are thought to be psychoactive, since indigenous Australians "burn its leaves and smoke the ash to obtain a state of inebriation."

== Weed status ==
Acacia salicina spreads widely through seed dispersal, and individual trees can rapidly form thickets through production of adventitious shoots from the root system. The species has become a significant weed over some of its native and introduced range.

== Gallery ==
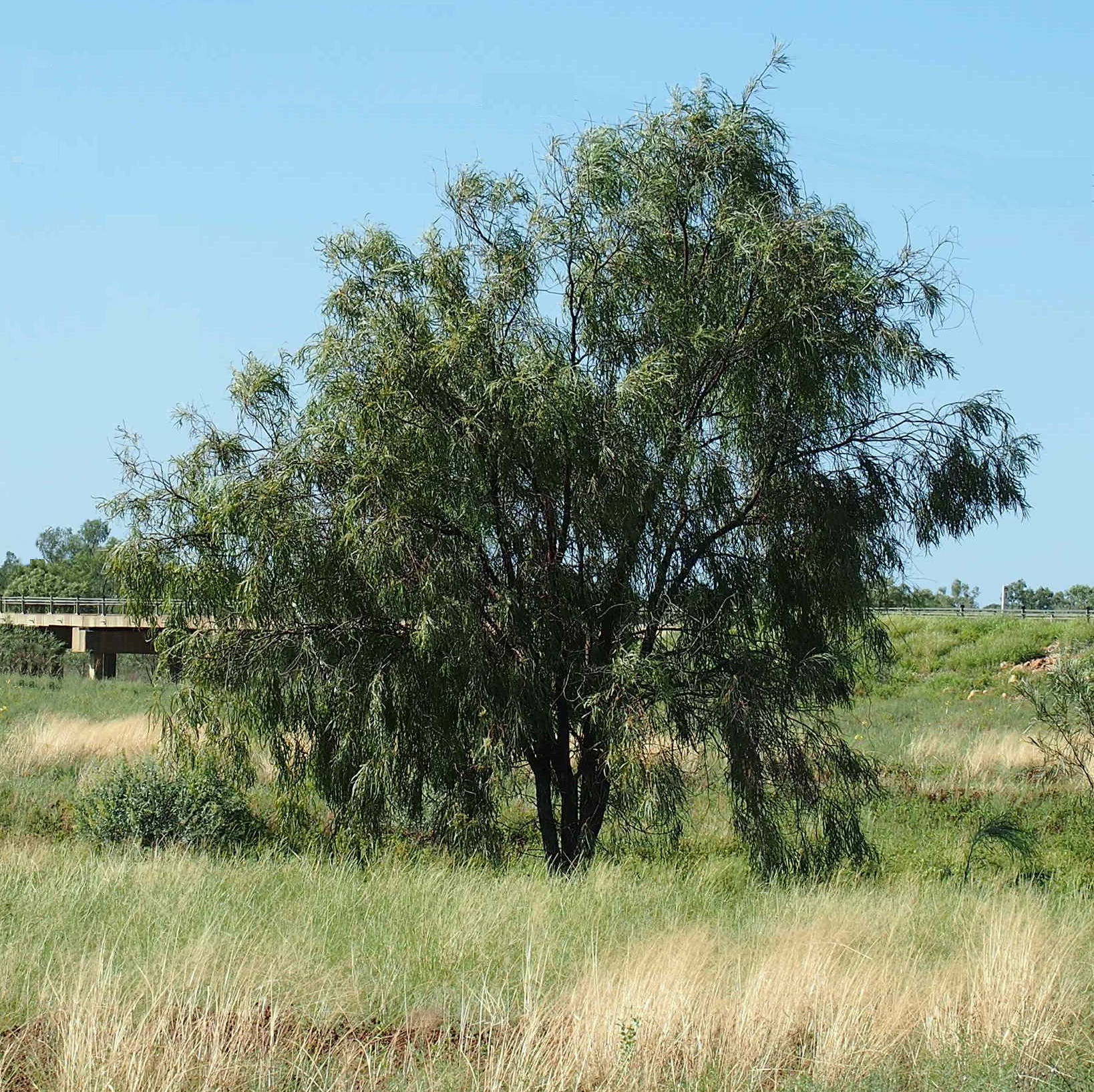
Habit near Longreach, Queensland

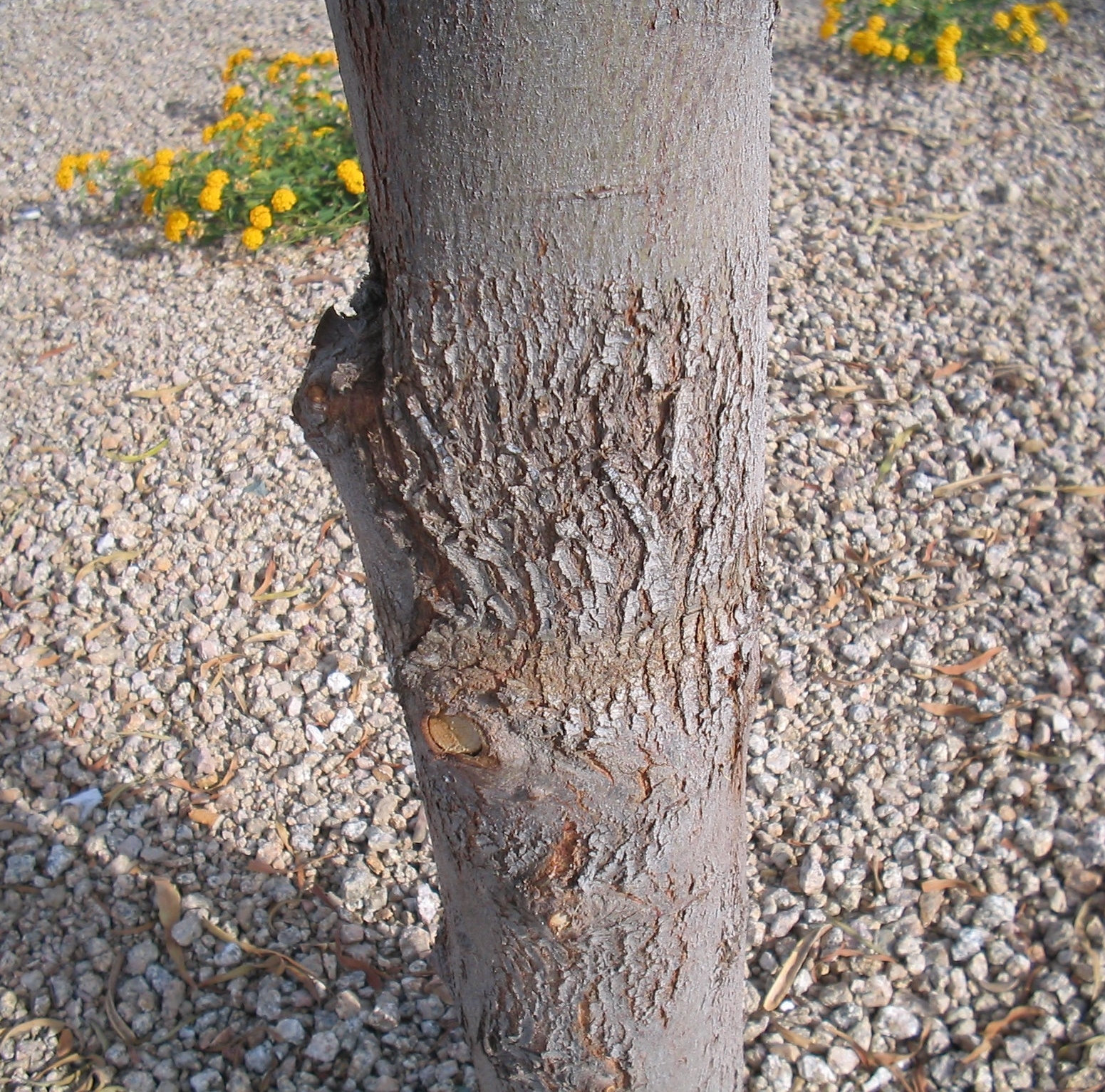
Bark

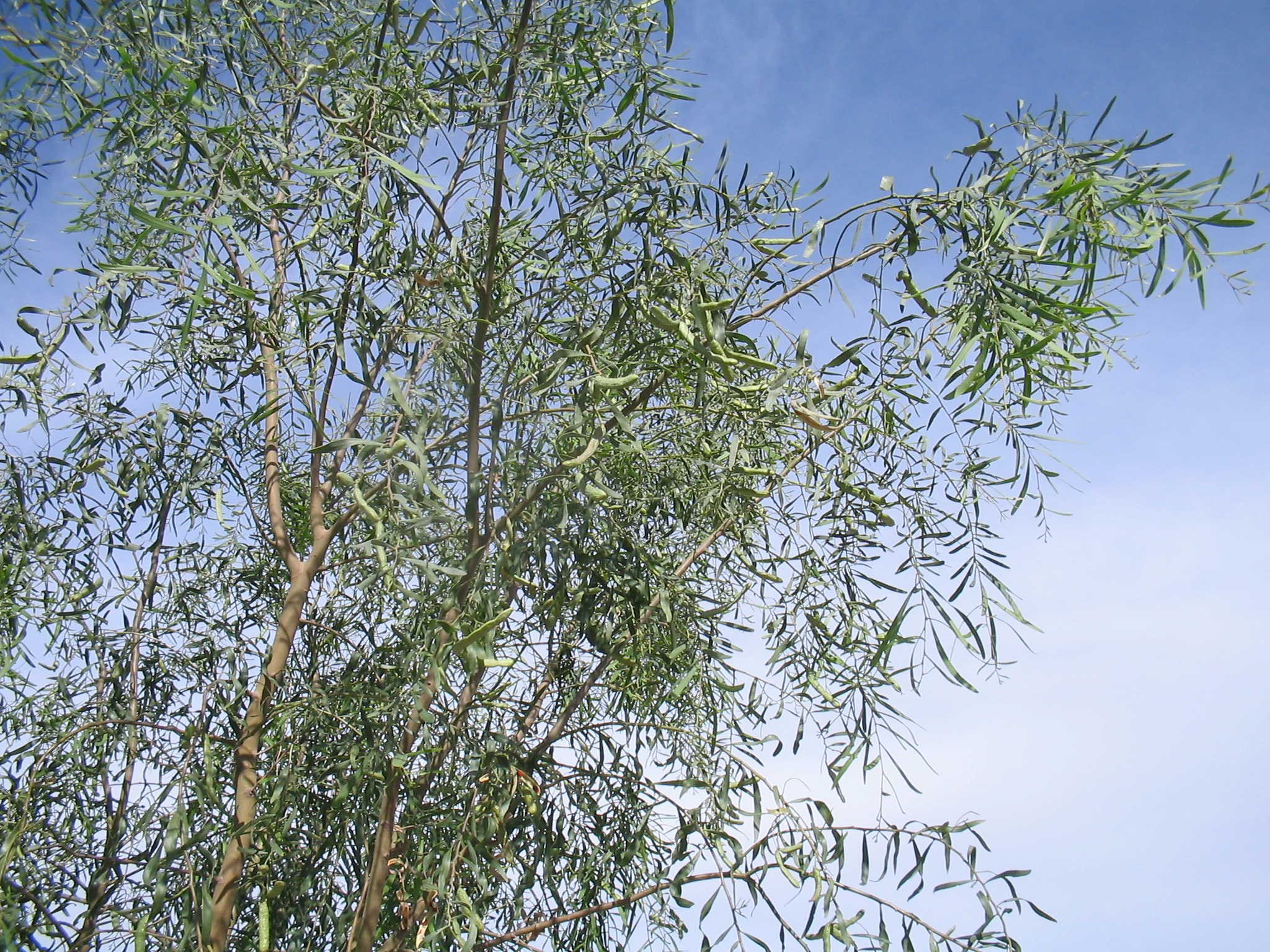
Branches with seed pods

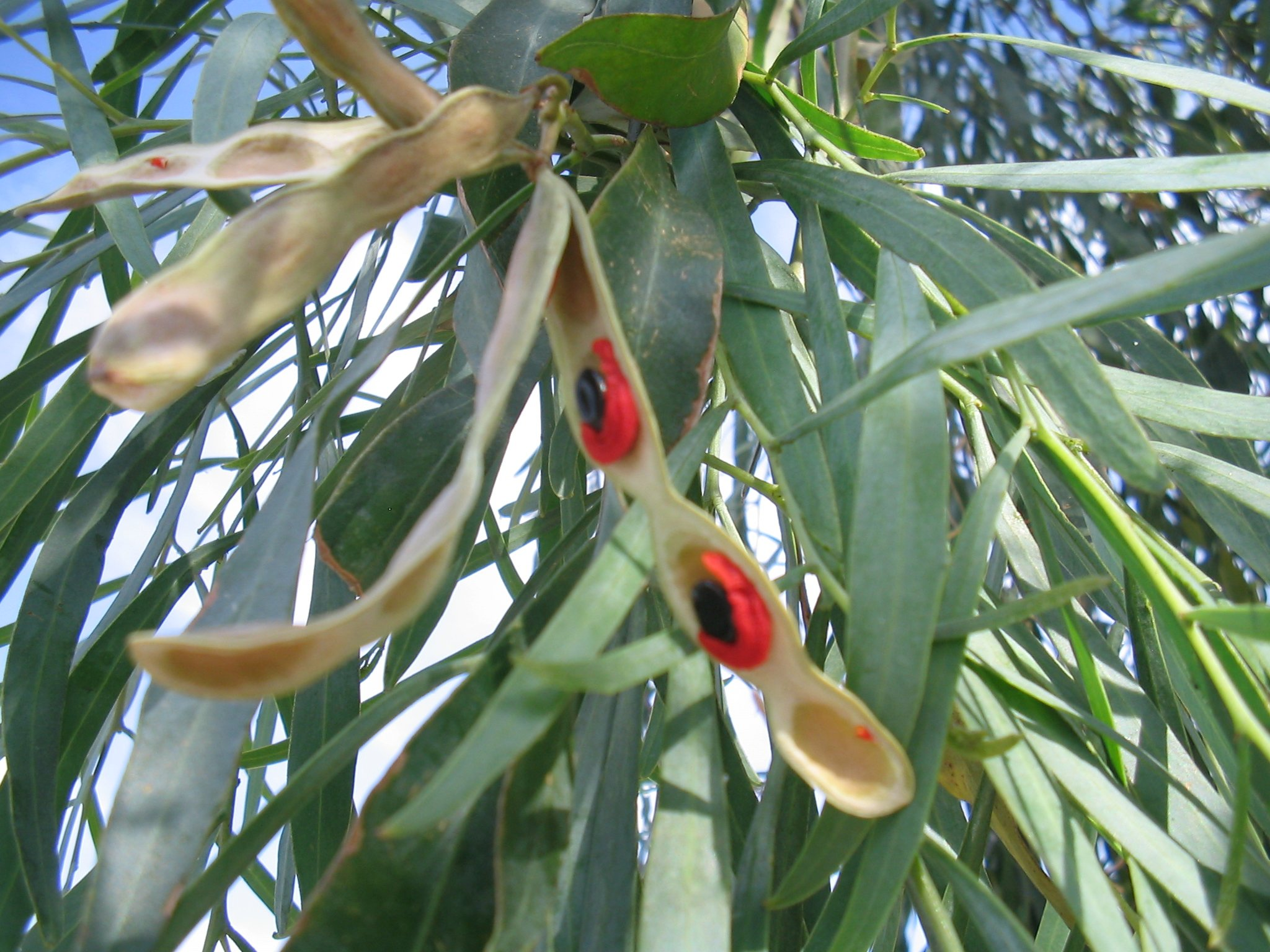
Foliage and pods with seeds

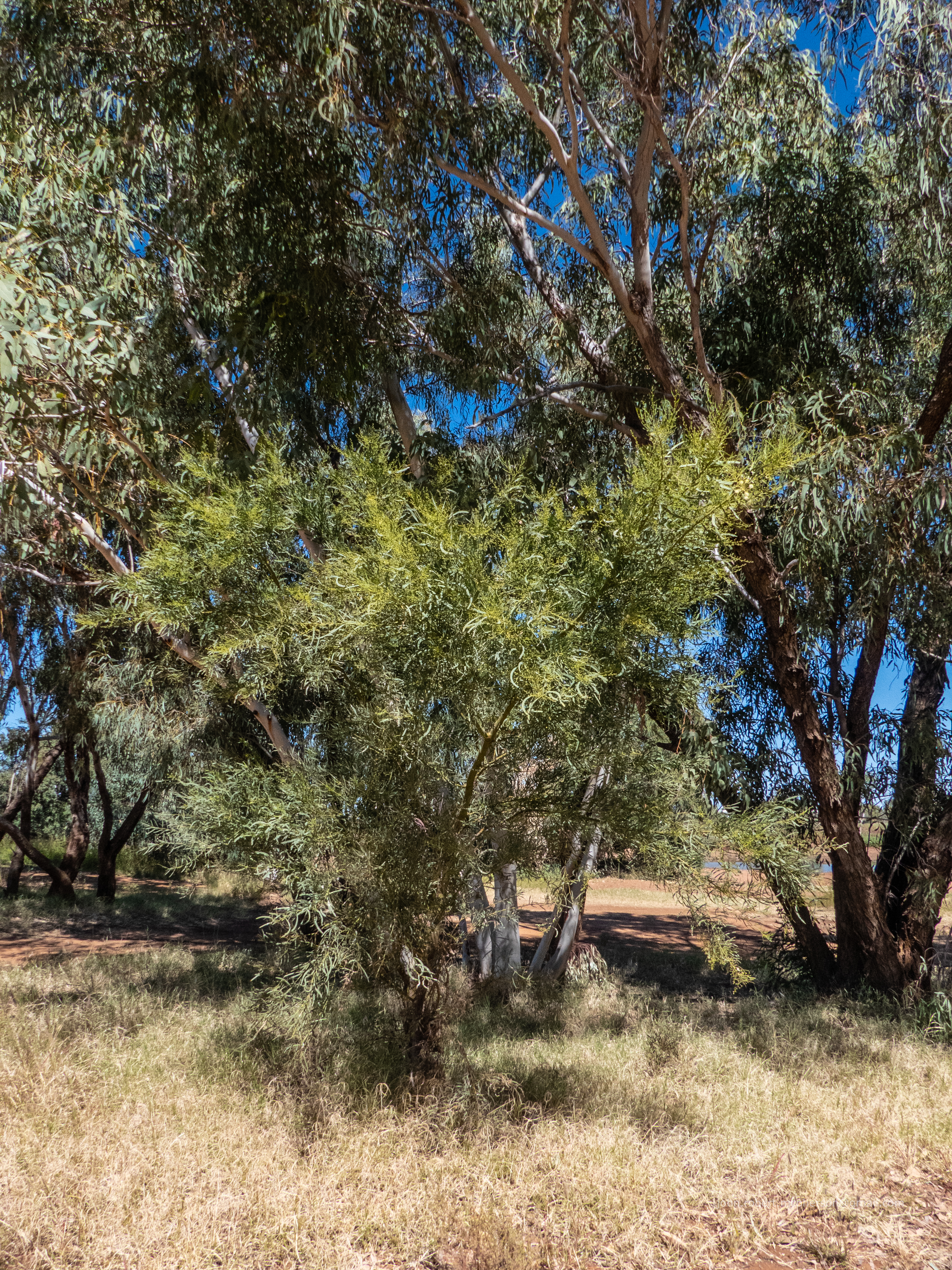
Habit on the Burke River floodplain

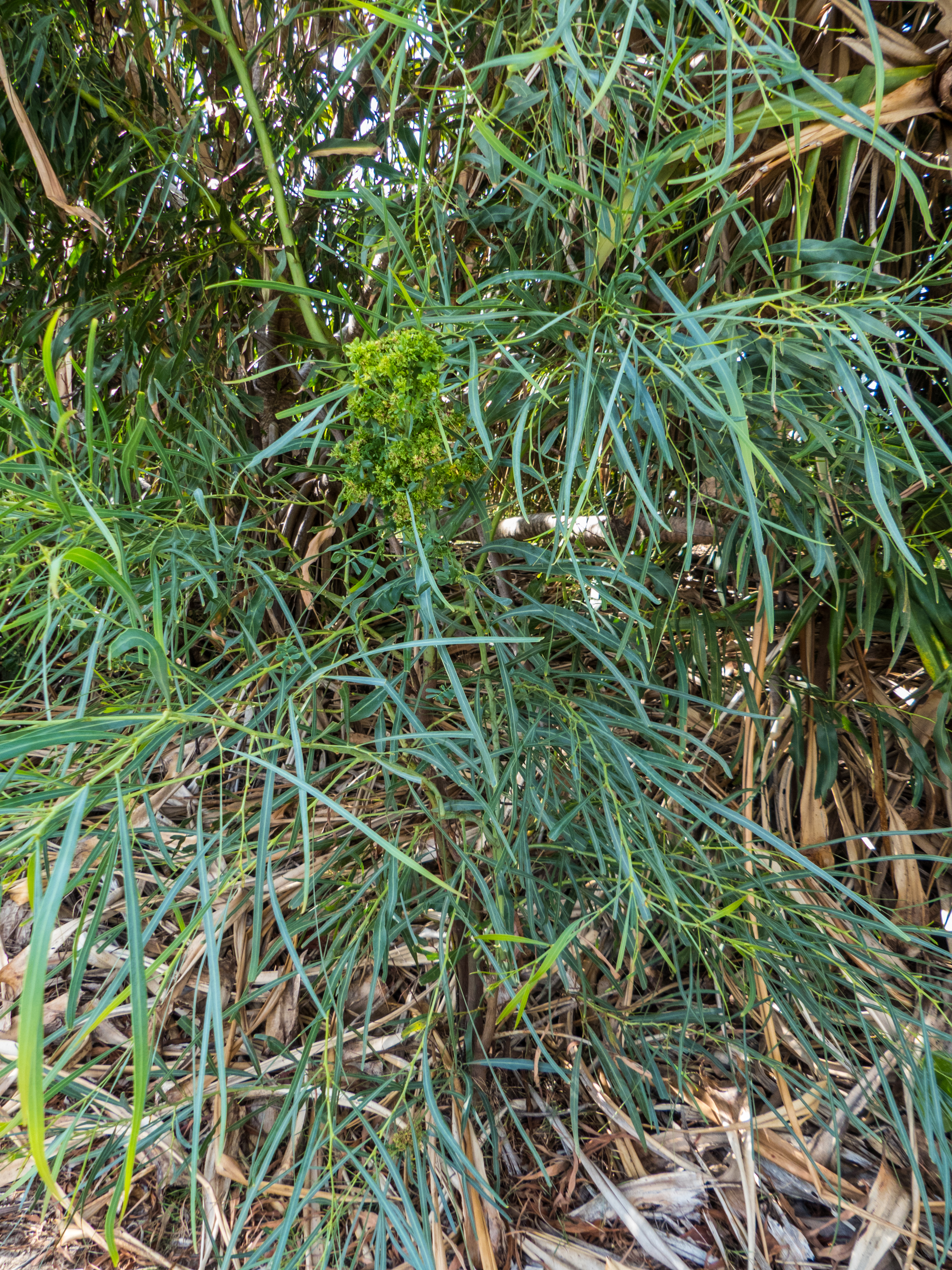
Foliage, near the Richmond River at Ballina, New South Wales.
