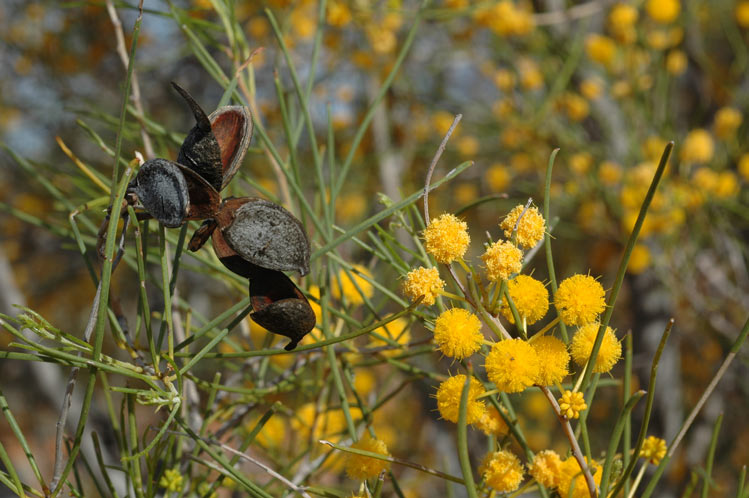
- Subsp. sclerosperma north of Yalgoo

Scientific classification
- Kingdom: Plantae
- Clade: Embryophytes
- Clade: Tracheophytes
- Clade: Spermatophytes
- Clade: Angiosperms
- Clade: Eudicots
- Clade: Rosids
- Order: Fabales
- Family: Fabaceae
- Subfamily: Caesalpinioideae
- Clade: Mimosoid clade
- Genus: Acacia
- Species: A. sclerosperma

Binomial name
- Acacia sclerosperma F.Muell.
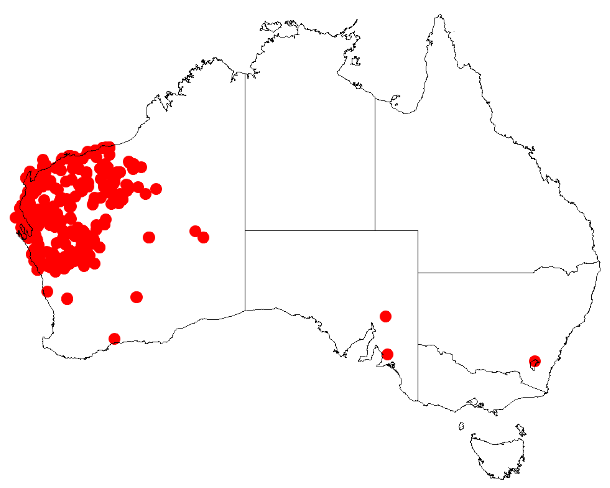
- Occurrence data from AVH

= Acacia sclerosperma =

Limestone wattle

Species of legume

Acacia sclerosperma, commonly known as limestone wattle or silver bark wattle, is a tree in the family Fabaceae. Endemic to Western Australia, it occurs on floodplains and along water-courses throughout the arid north-west corner of the State.

== Description ==
Limestone wattle grows as a spreading, tall shrub up to 4 m (13 ft) and 6 m (20 ft) wide. Like most Acacia species, it has phyllodes rather than true leaves. These are bright green, oval in cross-section, and may be up to 7 cm (2.8 in) long. The flowers are yellow, and held in cylindrical clusters about five millimetres in diameter and continuing 15 to 20 flowers. The pods are up to 4 cm (1.6 in) long, with constrictions between the seeds. It can bloom between May and August with most flowers produced between June and July.

== Taxonomy ==
There are two subspecies: Acacia sclerosperma subsp. sclerosperma and Acacia sclerosperma subsp. glaucescens. The latter is commonly known as billy blue, and is currently considered under threat, though not yet endangered. It belongs to the Acacia bivenosa group but unlike the rest of the group it has large woody seedpods. The type specimen was collected from along the Murchison River in 1881 by O.Jones.

== Distribution ==
It is found throughout the Pilbara, Midwest and northern parts of the Wheatbelt in Western Australia. The range extends from the Pilbara south to around Mingenew and Mount Magnet in the south with isolated populations found around Lake Carnegie and Wongan Hills. It grows in a variety of soil types usually as a part of shrubland and riparian woodland communities.

== See also ==
- List of Acacia species
