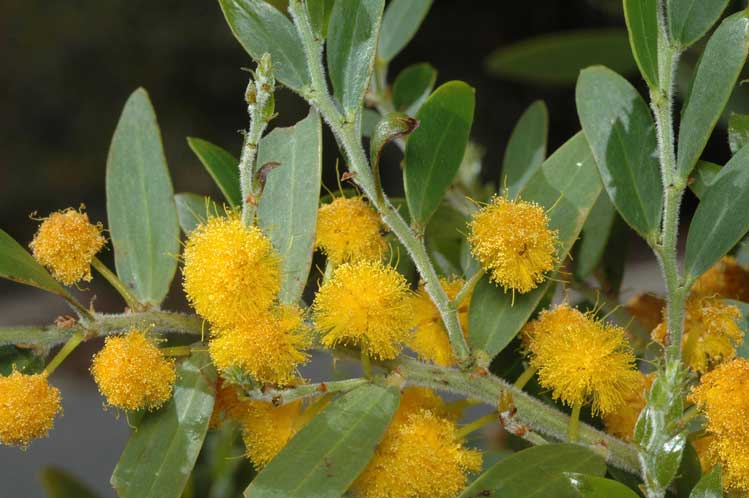
- In the Australian National Botanic Gardens

Scientific classification
- Kingdom: Plantae
- Clade: Embryophytes
- Clade: Tracheophytes
- Clade: Spermatophytes
- Clade: Angiosperms
- Clade: Eudicots
- Clade: Rosids
- Order: Fabales
- Family: Fabaceae
- Subfamily: Caesalpinioideae
- Clade: Mimosoid clade
- Genus: Acacia
- Species: A. telmica

Binomial name
- Acacia telmica A.R.Chapman & Maslin
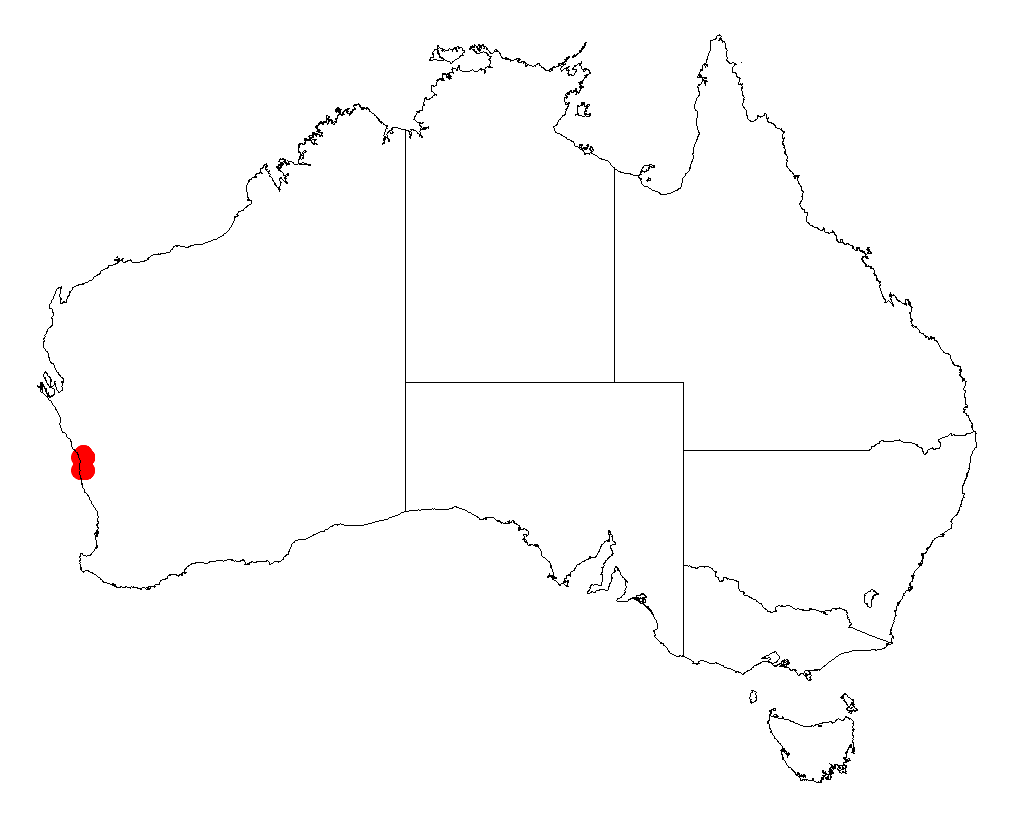
- Occurrence data from AVH

= Acacia telmica =

Species of legume

Acacia telmica is a shrub of the genus Acacia and the subgenus Phyllodineae. It is native to a small area in the Mid West region of Western Australia.

The dense rounded shrub typically grows to a height of 1 to 3 metres (3 to 10 ft). It blooms from July to September and produces yellow flowers.

== See also ==
- List of Acacia species
