= Acacia euthyphylla =

Conservation status
- Priority Three — Poorly Known Taxa (DEC)

Scientific classification
- Kingdom: Plantae
- Clade: Tracheophytes
- Clade: Angiosperms
- Clade: Eudicots
- Clade: Rosids
- Order: Fabales
- Family: Fabaceae
- Subfamily: Caesalpinioideae
- Clade: Mimosoid clade
- Genus: Acacia
- Species: A. euthyphylla

Binomial name
- Acacia euthyphylla Maslin
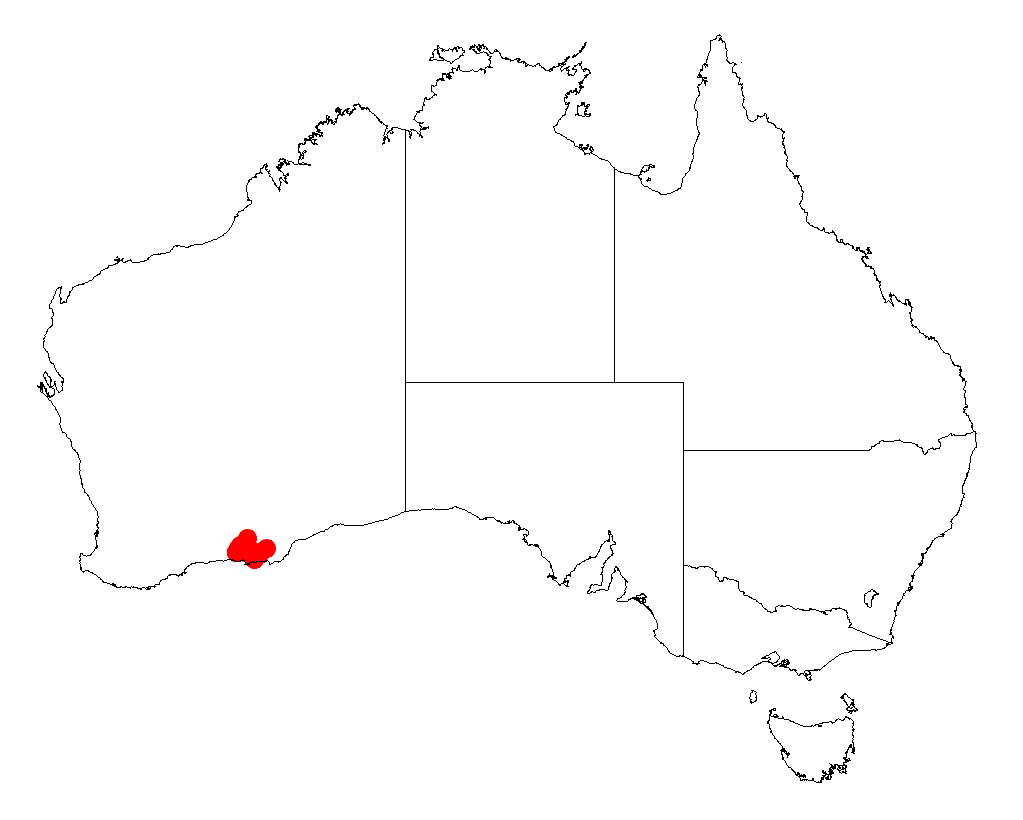
- Occurrence data from AVH

Synonyms
- Acacia aff. crassiuscula [P147] (B.R.Maslin 5804); Racosperma euthyphyllum (Maslin) Pedley

Species of legume

Acacia euthyphylla is a species of flowering plant in the family Fabaceae and is endemic to the south of Western Australia. It is a dense to medium dense, rounded to funnel-shaped shrub with finely ribbed, glabrous branchlets, erect linear phyllodes, spherical heads of golden yellow flowers and linear pods.

== Description ==
Acacia euthyphylla is a dense to medium dense rounded to funnel-shaped shrub that typically grows to a height of 1–2 m (3 ft 3 in – 6 ft 7 in) and has slightly bending, finely ribbed, glabrous branchlets. The phyllodes are erect, linear, straight to slightly curved, 40–90 mm (1.6–3.5 in) long, 2–3 mm (0.079–0.118 in) wide and slightly thickened, with a gland 10 mm (0.39 in) or more above the base of the phyllode. The flowers are borne in two spherical heads in axils on a peduncle 5–8 mm (0.20–0.31 in) long. Each head is 4–5 mm (0.16–0.20 in) in diameter with 18 to 23 golden yellow flowers. Flowering occurs in August and September and the immature pods are linear, up to 60 mm (2.4 in) long and 3.5 mm (0.14 in) wide.

== Taxonomy ==
Acacia euthyphylla was first formally described in 1999 by Bruce Maslin in the journal Nuytsia from specimens he collected 0.5 km (0.31 mi) south of the northern boundary of the Truslove water reserve in 1985. The specific epithet (euthyphylla) means 'straight-leaved' and refers to the more or less erect phyllodes.

== Distribution and habitat ==
This species of wattle grows in sand or clay loam in seasonal swamps, or around the edges of salt lakes, marshes and seasonally wet swamps between Truslove and east to Clyde Hill, (about 110 km (68 mi) east of Truslove in the Esperance Plains and Mallee bioregions of southern Western Australia.

== Conservation status ==
Acacia euthyphylla is listed as "Priority Three" by the Government of Western Australia Department of Biodiversity, Conservation and Attractions, meaning that it is poorly known and known from only a few locations but is not under imminent threat.

== See also ==
- List of Acacia species
