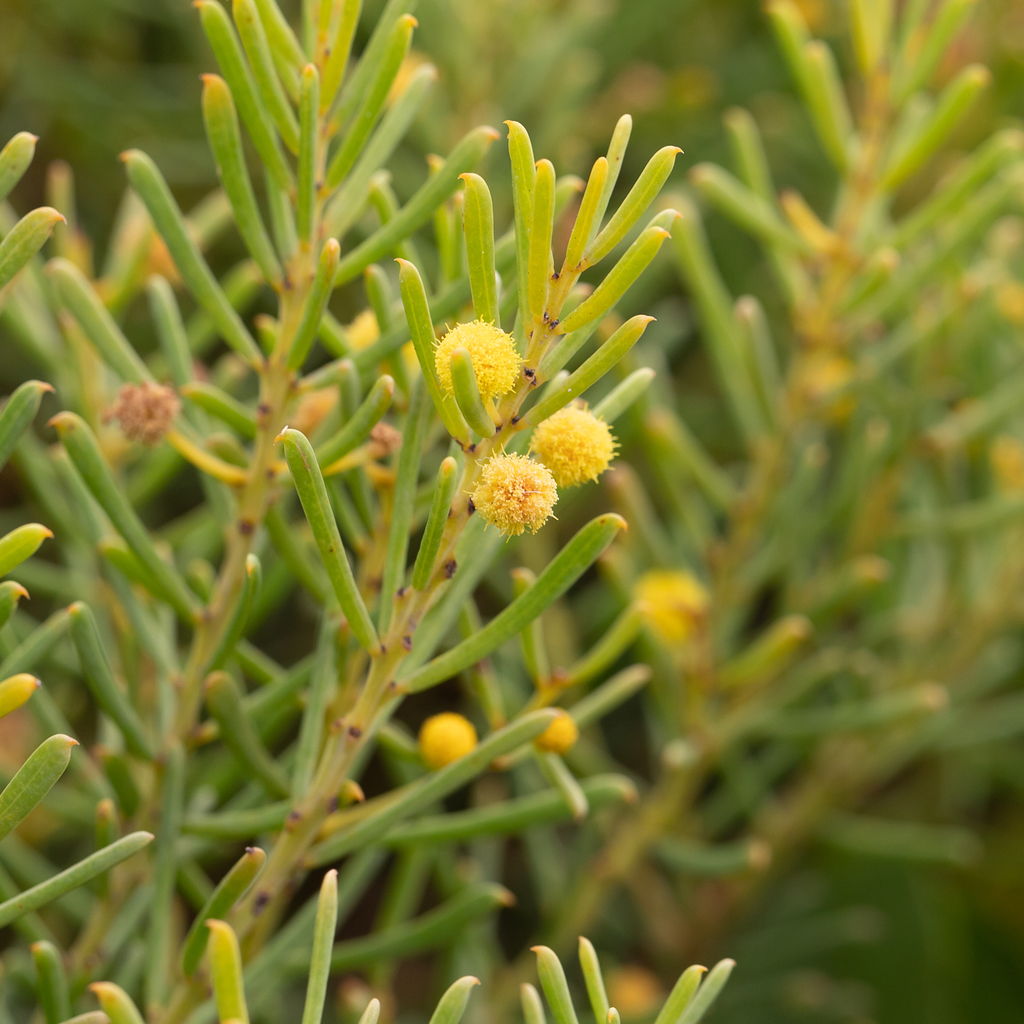
- Near Inneston on the Yorke Peninsula

Scientific classification
- Kingdom: Plantae
- Clade: Tracheophytes
- Clade: Angiosperms
- Clade: Eudicots
- Clade: Rosids
- Order: Fabales
- Family: Fabaceae
- Subfamily: Caesalpinioideae
- Clade: Mimosoid clade
- Genus: Acacia
- Species: A. nematophylla

Binomial name
- Acacia nematophylla F.Muell. ex Benth.
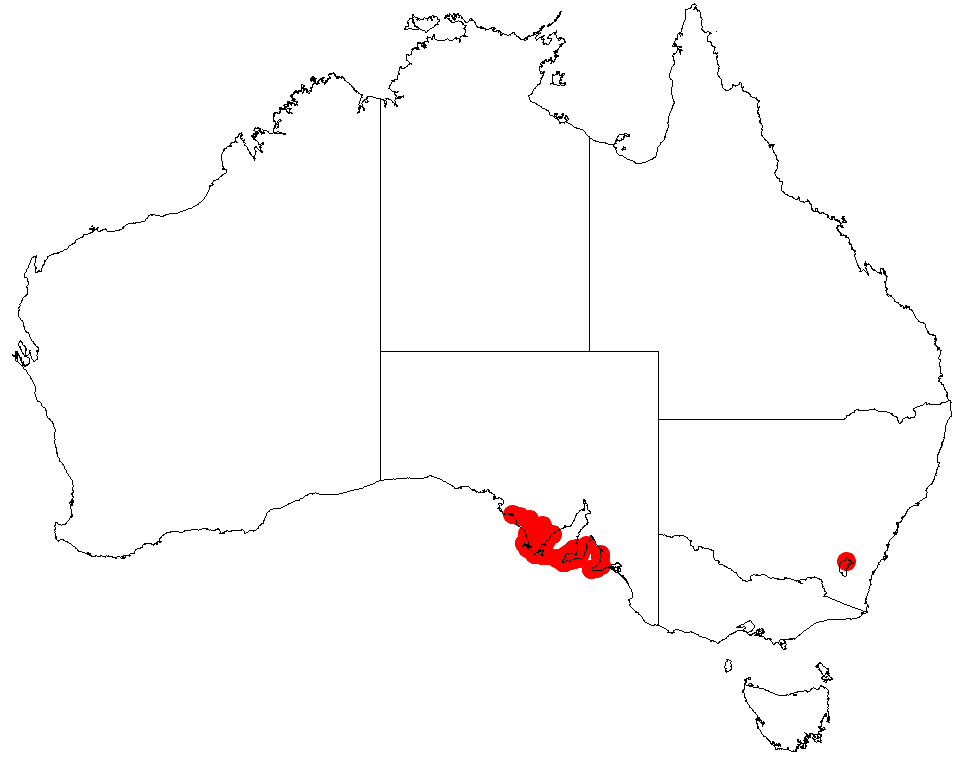
- Occurrence data from AVH

Synonyms
- Racosperma nematophyllum (F.Muell. ex Benth.) Pedley; Acacia calamifolia auct. non Sweet ex Lindl.: Whibley, D.J.E. & Symon, D.E. (1992)

= Acacia nematophylla =

Coast wallowa

Species of plant

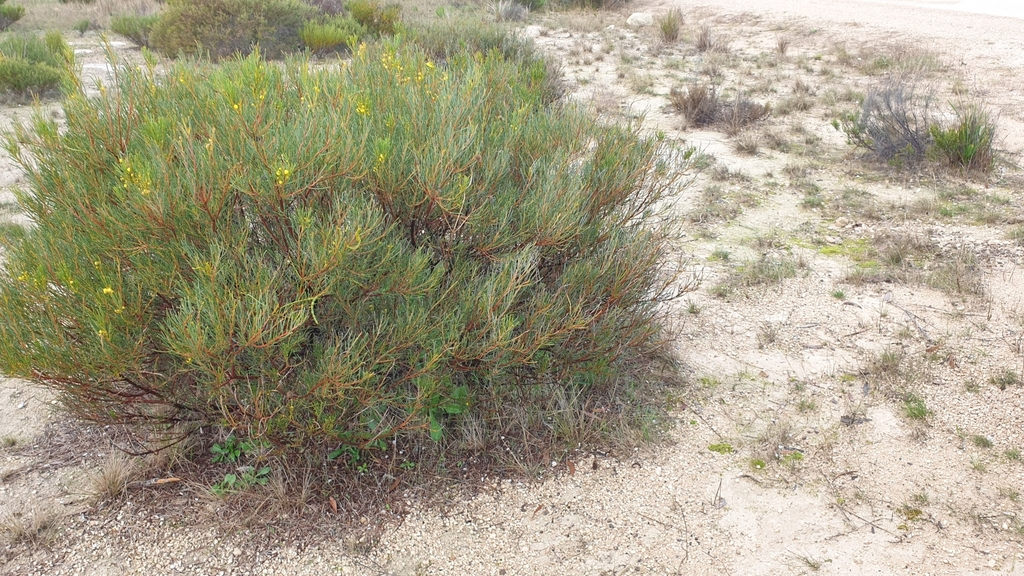
Habit near Foul Bay on the Yorke Peninsula

Acacia nematophylla, commonly known as coast wallowa, is a species of flowering plant in the family Fabaceae, and is endemic to near-coastal areas of South Australia. It is a bushy shrub with glabrous, angled branchlets, terete to flat, narrowly linear phyllodes, spherical heads of yellow flowers and erect, leathery to crusty, linear pods.

== Description ==
Acacia nematophylla is a bushy shrub that typically grows to a height of up to about 2.5 m (8 ft 2 in) and has glabrous branchlets that are angled at the outer end. The phyllodes are ascending to erect, tere' to flat, narrowly linear, straight to slightly curved, mostly 20–40 mm (0.79–1.57 in) long, 0.7–1.5 mm (0.028–0.059 in) wide with a sharply pointed or hook-shaped point on the end and four veins. The flowers are borne in a spherical head in axils on a glabrous peduncles 4–15 mm (0.16–0.59 in) long, each head with 28 to 41 yellow flowers. Flowering occurs in most months, with a peak in summer, and the pods are linear, up to 100 mm (3.9 in) long and 5–6 mm (0.20–0.24 in) wide, leathery to crusty or subwoody and glabrous. The seeds are oblong to elliptic, 4–5 mm (0.16–0.20 in) long, dul to slightly shiny brown to black with a club-shaped aril.

== Taxonomy ==
Acacia nematophylla was first formally described in 1855 by George Bentham in 1 in Linnaea: ein Journal für die Botanik in ihrem ganzen Umfange, oder Beiträge zur Pflanzenkunde from an unnpublished description by Ferdinand von Mueller. The specific epithet )(nematophylla) is taken from the Greek word nemato meaning 'thread-like' and phyllon meaning 'leaf' in reference to the shape of the phyllodes.

== Distribution and habitat ==
Coast wallowa grows on near-coastal sand dunes on the southern Eyre Peninsula, Yorke Peninsula and a few places on the Fleurieu Peninsula in South Australia.

== See also ==
- List of Acacia species
