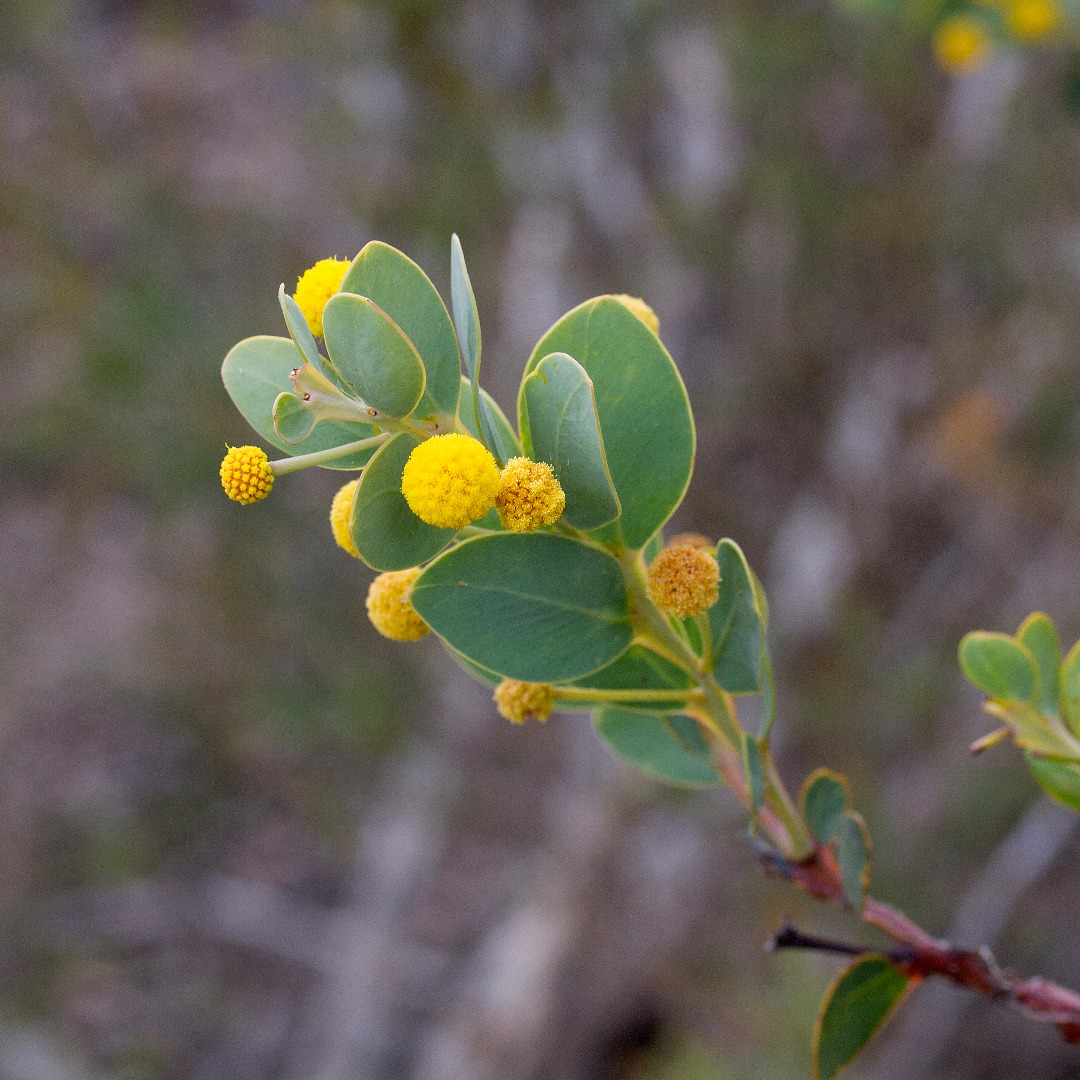
- In Lincoln National Park

Scientific classification
- Kingdom: Plantae
- Clade: Tracheophytes
- Clade: Angiosperms
- Clade: Eudicots
- Clade: Rosids
- Order: Fabales
- Family: Fabaceae
- Subfamily: Caesalpinioideae
- Clade: Mimosoid clade
- Genus: Acacia
- Species: A. anceps

Binomial name
- Acacia anceps DC.

Synonyms
- List: Acacia anceps DC. var. anceps; Acacia anceps var. angustifolia Benth.; Acacia celsiana Ser. nom. illeg.; Acacia glauca Ser. orth. var.; Acacia glaucescens F.Cels nom. illeg.; Acacia megaphylla Benth. nom. inval., pro syn.; Acacia megaphylla Benth. nom. inval., pro syn.; Acacia muelleri Benth.; Acacia pterigoidea Seem.; Racosperma anceps (DC.) Pedley; Acacia retinodes auct. non Schltdl.: Nelson, E.C. (1974)

= Acacia anceps =

Port Lincoln wattle

Species of legume

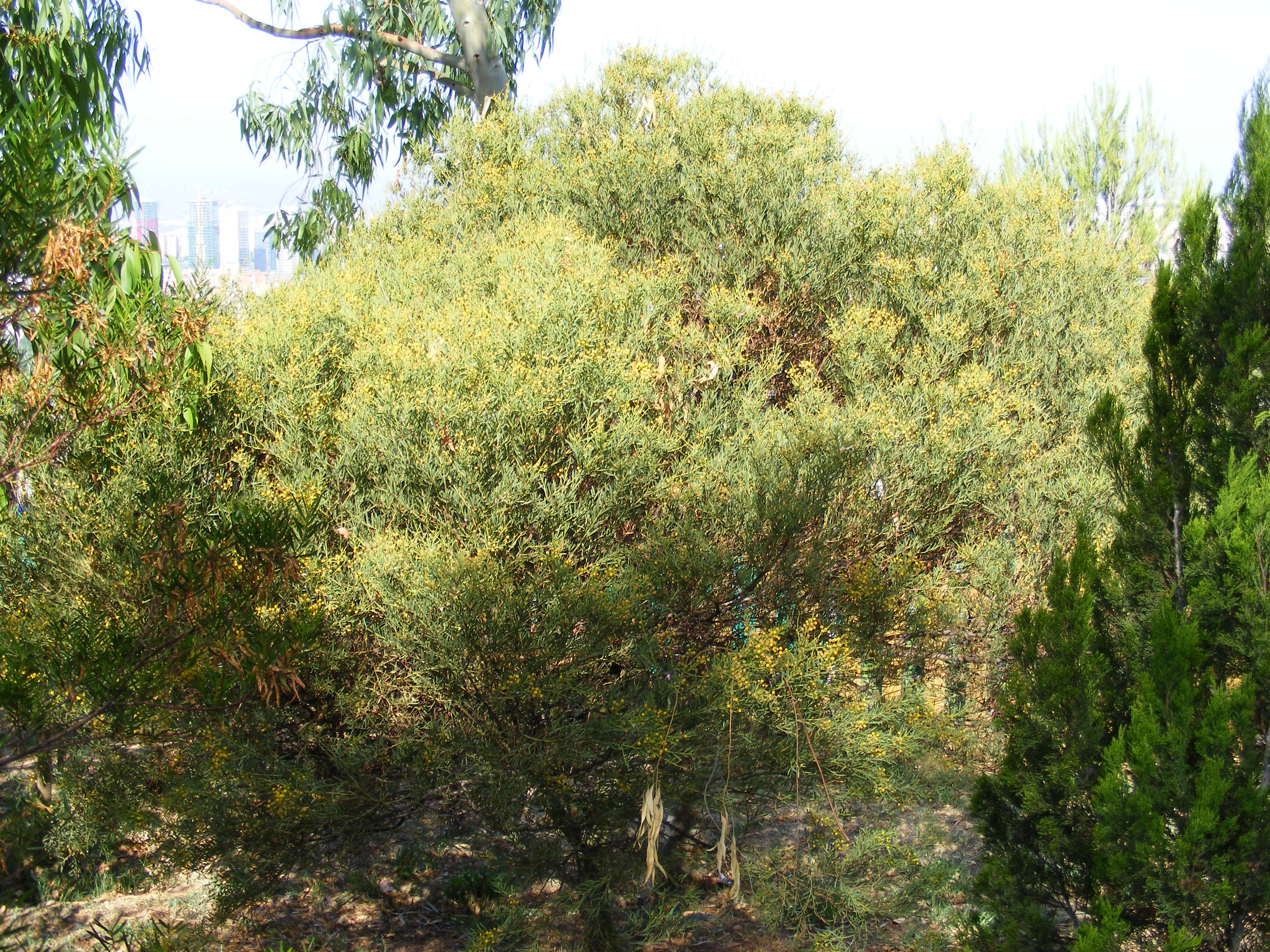
Habit in the Barcelona Botanic Garden

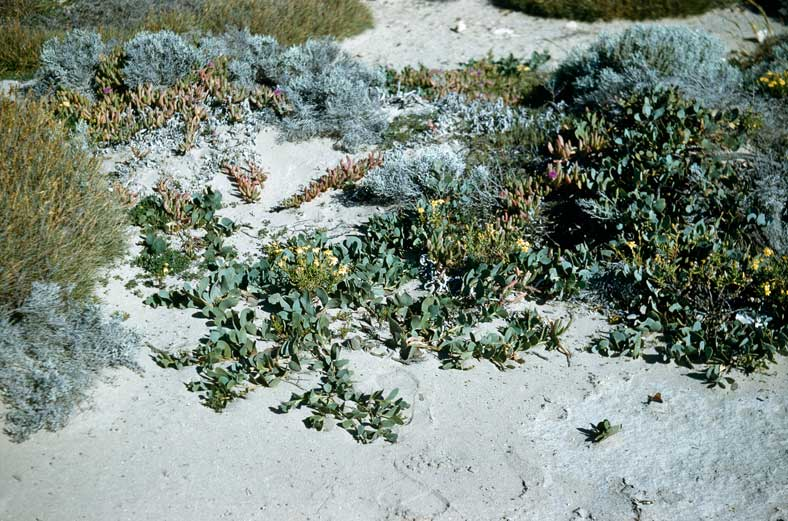
Habit at Elliston Beach

Acacia anceps, commonly known as Port Lincoln wattle or the two edged wattle, is a species of flowering plant in the family Fabaceae and is endemic to coastal areas of south-western Australia. It is a bushy, spreading shrub with glabrous branchlets angled at the ends, elliptic to lance-shaped phyllodes with the narrower end towards the base, spherical heads of 50 to 130 golden-yellow flowers, and narrowly oblong pods up to 60 mm (2.4 in) long.

== Description ==
Acacia anceps is a bushy spreading shrub that typically grows to a height of up to 1–3 m (3 ft 3 in – 9 ft 10 in) and has branchlets that are glabrous and angled near the ends. The phyllodes are usually elliptic to lance-shaped with the narrower end towards the base, mostly 25–65 mm (0.98–2.56 in) long, 8–30 mm (0.31–1.18 in) wide, and leathery, sometimes continuous with the branchlets.

The inflorescences are arranged singly in leaf axils in heads of 50 to 130 golden-yellow flowers on a stout, glabrous peduncle mostly 10–26 mm (0.39–1.02 in) long. Flowering occurs from September to February and the pods are narrowly oblong, crust-like to woody, red to brown straight to curved, normally up to 60 mm (2.4 in) long and 10–15 mm (0.39–0.59 in) wide. The seeds are oblong to elliptic, 4.5–6 mm (0.18–0.24 in) long with a reddish-brown stalk.

== Taxonomy ==
Acacia anceps was first formally described in 1825 by Augustin Pyramus de Candolle in his Prodromus Systematis Naturalis Regni Vegetabilis. The specific epithet (anceps) means 'two-sided' referring to the flattened stems.

== Distribution and habitat ==
This wattle is endemic to an area along the south coast of southern Australia, where it grows in coastal dune vegetation or open scrub from the Middle Island of the Recherche Archipelago in Western Australia to the Eyre and Yorke Peninsulas in South Australia.

== Use in horticulture ==
The plant is used as an ornamental wattle that thrives in coastal locations and is planted as a windbreak. It can be propagated from seeds or from cuttings but needs well drained soils. It will tolerate full sun or part shade and is drought tolerant.

== See also ==
- List of Acacia species
