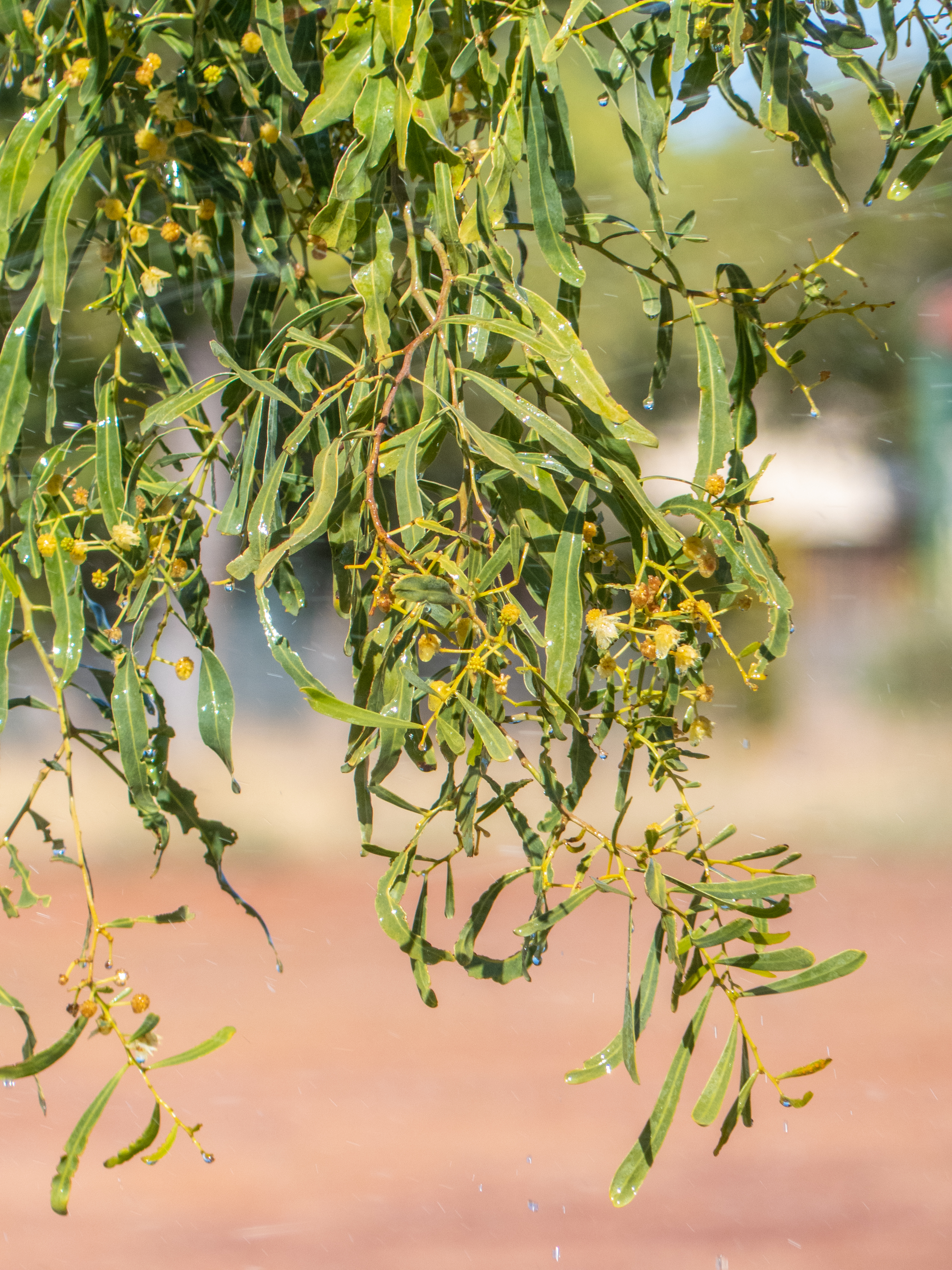

Conservation status
- Least Concern (IUCN 3.1)

Scientific classification
- Kingdom: Plantae
- Clade: Embryophytes
- Clade: Tracheophytes
- Clade: Spermatophytes
- Clade: Angiosperms
- Clade: Eudicots
- Clade: Rosids
- Order: Fabales
- Family: Fabaceae
- Subfamily: Caesalpinioideae
- Clade: Mimosoid clade
- Genus: Acacia
- Species: A. ampliceps

Binomial name
- Acacia ampliceps Maslin
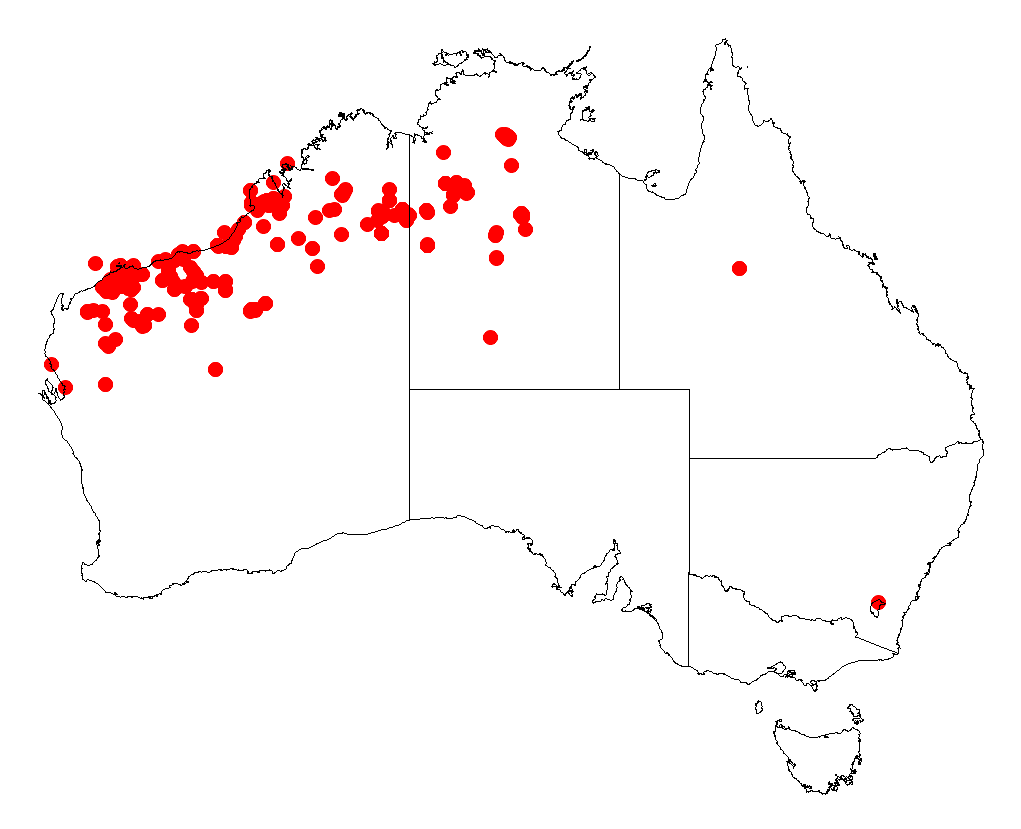
- Occurrence data from Australasian Virtual Herbarium

Synonyms
- Racosperma ampliceps (Maslin) Pedley

= Acacia ampliceps =

Salt wattle

Species of legume

Acacia ampliceps, commonly known as salt wattle or spring wattle, is a species of flowering plant in the family Fabaceae and is endemic to the north-west of Australia. It is a large, bushy shrub or small tree with often pendulous branches, pendulous, linear to lance-shaped phyllodes, white to cream-coloured flowers arranged in spherical heads, and pods up to 115 mm (4.5 in) long.

== Description ==
Acacia ampliceps is a bushy shrub or small tree that typically grows to a height of 3–5 m (9.8–16.4 ft), sometimes to 6–7 m (20–23 ft) or higher or sometimes a prostrate shrub. Its branchlets are glabrous, yellow-coloured, and often pendulous. The phyllodes are usually pendulous, variably shaped but often linear to lance-shaped, 70–250 mm (2.8–9.8 in) long and 7–30 mm (0.28–1.18 in) wide with a prominent vein and 2 glands with one of them up to 3 mm (0.12 in) above the pulvinus. The flowers are arranged in 2 to 11 heads racemes up to 100 mm (3.9 in) long, on a peduncle 5–20 mm (0.20–0.79 in) long, in the axils or on the ends of branches. Each head contains 25 to 50 white to creamy-coloured flowers. Flowering occurs from May to September, and the fruit is a pod up to 115 mm (4.5 in) long and 4–6 mm (0.16–0.24 in) wide, and appearing somewhat like a string of beads. The seeds are oblong, greyish brown to black with a scarlet aril.

== Taxonomy ==
Acacia ampliceps was first formally described by Bruce Maslin in 1974 in the journal Nuytsia from specimens he collected near the Sandfire Roadhouse in 1972. The specific epithet (ampliceps) means 'large head', alluding to the flower heads.

== Distribution ==
Salt wattle is native to areas south of Wooramel through the Pilbara district, the Great Sandy Desert and the southern Kimberley region in Western Australia, and east to Mataranka and Renner Springs in the Northern Territory. It occurs along watercourses and in floodplains, on coastal sand dunes, and salt flats, growing in sandy soils.

== See also ==
- List of Acacia species
