= Acacia maxwellii =

Scientific classification
- Kingdom: Plantae
- Clade: Tracheophytes
- Clade: Angiosperms
- Clade: Eudicots
- Clade: Rosids
- Order: Fabales
- Family: Fabaceae
- Subfamily: Caesalpinioideae
- Clade: Mimosoid clade
- Genus: Acacia
- Species: A. maxwellii

Binomial name
- Acacia maxwellii Maiden & Blakely
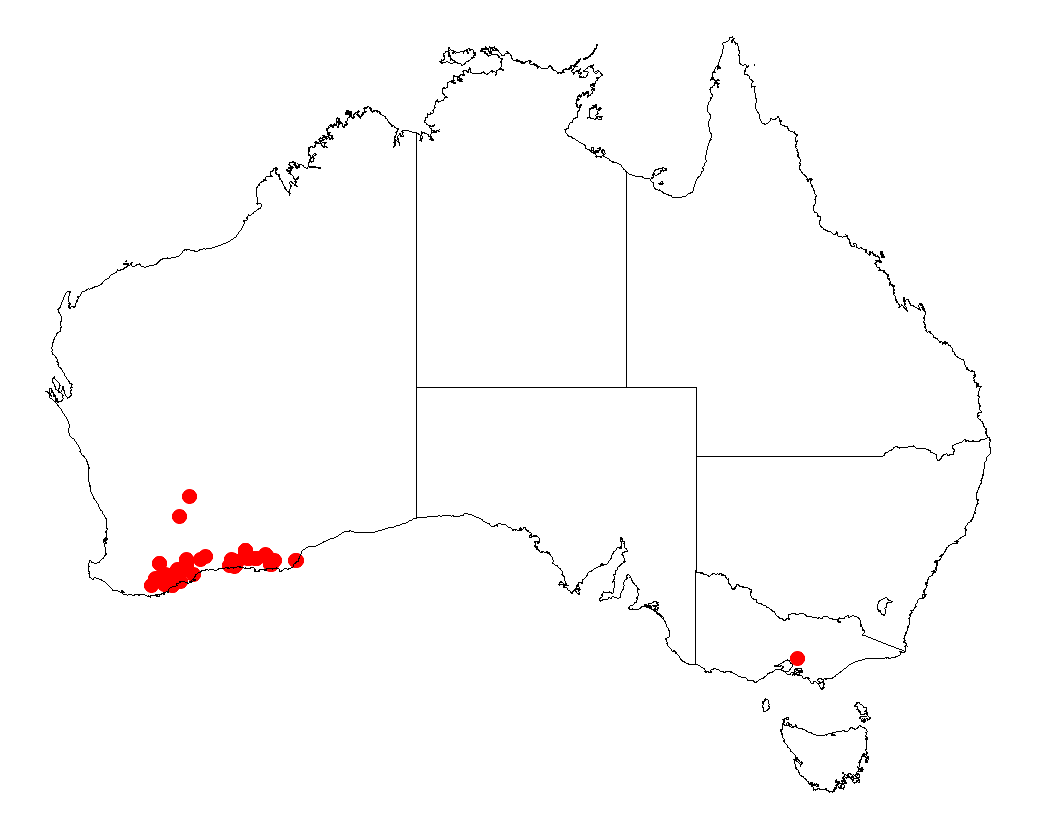
- Acacia maxwellii occurrence data from Australasian Virtual Herbarium

Synonyms
- Acacia maxwelli Maiden & Blakely orth. var.; Acacia ramosissima Benth. nom. illeg.; Racosperma maxwellii (Maiden & Blakely) Pedley

Species of legume

Acacia maxwellii is a species of flowering plant in the family Fabaceae and is endemic to the south-west of Western Australia. It is a prostrate, sometimes domed shrub with hairy branchlets, erect, linear, glabrous phyllodes, spherical heads of pale yellow to cream-coloured flowers, and linear, crusty pods.

== Description ==
Acacia maxwellii is a prostrate, sometimes domed shrub that typically grows to a height of up to 40 cm (16 in) and has branchlets covered with soft hairs. Its phyllodes are erect, linear, straight to slightly curved, 15–60 mm (0.59–2.36 in) long, 1–3 mm (0.039–0.118 in) wide and glabrous. There is usually a gland 0.5–3.5 mm (0.020–0.138 in) above the pulvinus and sometimes stipules at the base of the phyllodes. The flowers are borne in up to three spherical heads on peduncles 10–20 mm (0.39–0.79 in) long. The heads are about 5 mm (0.20 in) in diameter with 11 to 17 pale yellow to cream-coloured flowers. Flowering occurs in September and October and the pods are linear, up to 40 mm (1.6 in) long, 4–5 mm (0.16–0.20 in) wide, crusty, glabrous and dark brown. The seeds are broadly oblong to circular and bloated, about 3 mm (0.12 in) long and dull light brown with a thick aril.

== Taxonomy ==
Acacia maxwellii was first formally described in 1928 by Joseph Maiden and William Blakely in the Journal of the Royal Society of Western Australia from specimens collected in the Fitzgerald Range by George Maxwell in 1867. The specific epithet (maxwellii) honours the collector of the type specimens.

== Distribution and habitat ==
This species of wattle grows in sand, sandy clay, loamy or gravelly soils from near the Stirling Range and east to Israelite Bay, in shrub mallee and mallee heath, in the Esperance Plains, Jarrah Forest and Mallee bioregions in the south-west of Western Australia.

== See also ==
- List of Acacia species
