= Acacia startii =

Scientific classification
- Kingdom: Plantae
- Clade: Tracheophytes
- Clade: Angiosperms
- Clade: Eudicots
- Clade: Rosids
- Order: Fabales
- Family: Fabaceae
- Subfamily: Caesalpinioideae
- Clade: Mimosoid clade
- Genus: Acacia
- Species: A. startii

Binomial name
- Acacia startii A.R.Chapman & Maslin
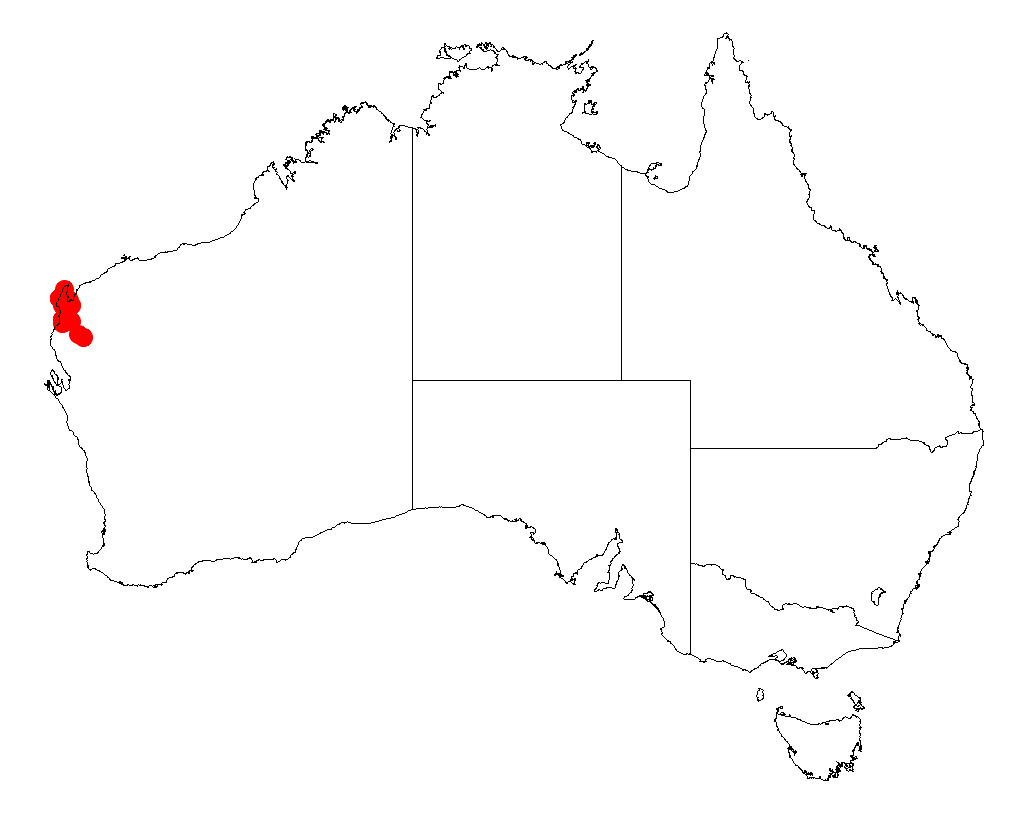
- Occurrence data from AVH

Species of legume

Acacia startii is a shrub of the genus Acacia and the subgenus Phyllodineae. It is native to an area in the Gascoyne region of Western Australia.

== Ecology ==
The dense multi-branched shrub typically grows to a height of 1 to 2 metres (3 to 7 ft). It blooms from July to August and produces green-yellow flowers.

== See also ==
- List of Acacia species
