= Tetratheca retrorsa =

Scientific classification
- Kingdom: Plantae
- Clade: Tracheophytes
- Clade: Angiosperms
- Clade: Eudicots
- Clade: Rosids
- Order: Oxalidales
- Family: Elaeocarpaceae
- Genus: Tetratheca
- Species: T. retrorsa

Binomial name
- Tetratheca retrorsa Joy Thomps., 1976

Species of flowering plant

Tetratheca retrorsa is a species of plant in the quandong family that is endemic to Australia.

== Description ==
The species grows as a spindly, sparsely-leaved, spreading shrub to 1.5 m in height. The pink flowers appear from September to October.

== Distribution and habitat ==
The range of the species lies in the Avon Wheatbelt and Jarrah Forest IBRA bioregions of south-west Western Australia. The plants grow on lateritic breakaways.
