= Tetratheca similis =

Scientific classification
- Kingdom: Plantae
- Clade: Tracheophytes
- Clade: Angiosperms
- Clade: Eudicots
- Clade: Rosids
- Order: Oxalidales
- Family: Elaeocarpaceae
- Genus: Tetratheca
- Species: T. similis

Binomial name
- Tetratheca similis Joy Thomps., 1976

Species of flowering plant

Tetratheca similis is a species of plant in the quandong family that is endemic to Australia.

== Description ==
The species grows as a spreading shrub to 30 cm in height. The pink flowers appear from August to September.

== Distribution and habitat ==
The range of the species lies in the Avon Wheatbelt and Jarrah Forest IBRA bioregions of south-west Western Australia. The plants grow in sandy clay soils with lateritic boulders.
