= Tetratheca decora =

Scientific classification
- Kingdom: Plantae
- Clade: Tracheophytes
- Clade: Angiosperms
- Clade: Eudicots
- Clade: Rosids
- Order: Oxalidales
- Family: Elaeocarpaceae
- Genus: Tetratheca
- Species: T. decora

Binomial name
- Tetratheca decora Joy Thomps., 1976

Species of flowering plant

Tetratheca decora, also known as black-eyed susan, is a species of plant in the quandong family that is endemic to Australia.

== Description ==
The species grows as a small, erect shrub to 30–40 cm in height. The deep lilac-pink flowers have petals 6–15 mm long, appearing mainly from September to November.

== Distribution and habitat ==
The plants have a scattered distribution across central eastern New South Wales from the Warrumbungles to the Nowra area, occurring in heath and dry sclerophyll forest on sandstone substrates.
