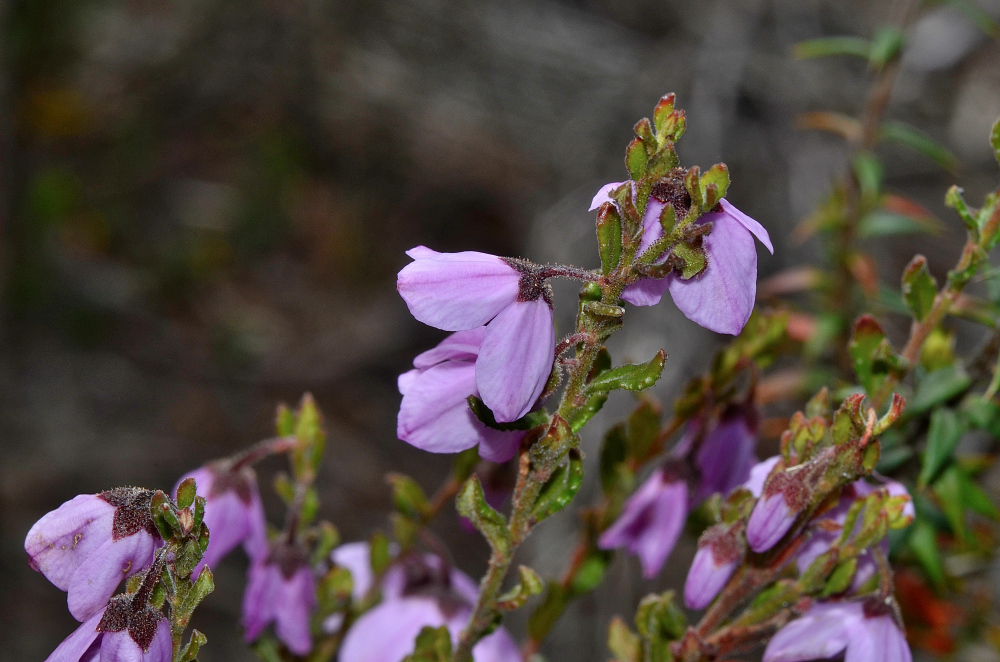
- Specimen growing in the Waverly Flora Park, Bellerive, Tasmania, Australia.

Scientific classification
- Kingdom: Plantae
- Clade: Tracheophytes
- Clade: Angiosperms
- Clade: Eudicots
- Clade: Rosids
- Order: Oxalidales
- Family: Elaeocarpaceae
- Genus: Tetratheca
- Species: T. labillardierei

Binomial name
- Tetratheca labillardierei Joy Thomps., 1976

= Tetratheca labillardierei =

Species of flowering plant

Tetratheca labillardierei, also known as Glandular Pink-Bells, is a species of plant in the quandong family that is endemic to Australia.

== Description ==
The species grows as a compact, erect shrub to 100 cm in height. The leaves are 2–20 mm long and usually less than 5 mm wide. The solitary or paired, deep lilac-pink flowers have petals 6–11 mm long, appearing from October to January.

== Distribution and habitat ==
The plants grow in heath and sclerophyll forest, from the Budawang Range of south-eastern New South Wales southwards into Victoria and Tasmania.
