= T. neglecta =

T. neglecta may refer to:

- Tapura neglecta, a plant species endemic to Gabon
- Tarentola neglecta, the Algerian wall gecko, a lizard species found in Algeria and Tunisia
- Templetonia neglecta, a flowering plant species in the genus Templetonia
- Tetratheca neglecta, Joy Thomps., a plant species in the genus Tetratheca endemic to Australia
- Tillandsia neglecta, a plant species endemic to Brazil

== See also ==
- Neglecta (disambiguation)
