= Tetratheca rupicola =

Scientific classification
- Kingdom: Plantae
- Clade: Tracheophytes
- Clade: Angiosperms
- Clade: Eudicots
- Clade: Rosids
- Order: Oxalidales
- Family: Elaeocarpaceae
- Genus: Tetratheca
- Species: T. rupicola

Binomial name
- Tetratheca rupicola Joy Thomps., 1976

Species of flowering plant

Tetratheca rupicola is a species of plant in the quandong family that is endemic to Australia.

== Description ==
The species grows as a compact or diffuse shrub to 20–40 cm in height. The solitary pink flowers have petals 6–15 mm long, appearing from October to December.

== Distribution and habitat ==
The plants grow in sandy and rocky soils in heath and sclerophyll forest in the Blue Mountains of central eastern New South Wales.
