= Tetratheca stenocarpa =

Long pink-bells

Scientific classification
- Kingdom: Plantae
- Clade: Tracheophytes
- Clade: Angiosperms
- Clade: Eudicots
- Clade: Rosids
- Order: Oxalidales
- Family: Elaeocarpaceae
- Genus: Tetratheca
- Species: T. stenocarpa

Binomial name
- Tetratheca stenocarpa J.H.Willis

Species of shrub

Tetratheca stenocarpa, commonly known as long pink-bells, is a small shrub in the family Elaeocarpaceae. It is endemic to Victoria in Australia.

== Description ==
It is a prostrate or weeping small shrub which grows to between 1 and 1.5 metres high and 0.5 to 1 metre wide. The leaves are triangular to rounded with toothed edges. These are 5 to 12 millimetres long and wide and are reduced to scales on flowering stems and are often only seen on young growth. The pale to deep lilac-pink (rarely white) bell-shaped flowers appear between July and January in their native range. These occur in clusters of 1 to 3 on petioles with dense, gland-tipped hairs.

It is similar in appearance to Tetratheca ciliata, but the latter has petioles with only a few gland-tipped hairs.

== Taxonomy ==
The species was first formally described by James Hamlyn Willis in The Victorian Naturalist in 1957. He discovered the species in 1952 near Gembrook.

== Distribution ==
The species has a restricted distribution, occurring in damp forests in hilly country to the east of Melbourne, on French Island and in a separate population in Gisborne. The species is classified as rare in Victoria. It adapts well to disturbed sites, and is often found on exposed road cuttings.

== Cultivation ==
The species is free-flowering and is suitable for moist shady positions. It can be situated under established trees or at the top of retaining walls, or used in a cottage garden setting.
