= Tetratheca paucifolia =

Scientific classification
- Kingdom: Plantae
- Clade: Tracheophytes
- Clade: Angiosperms
- Clade: Eudicots
- Clade: Rosids
- Order: Oxalidales
- Family: Elaeocarpaceae
- Genus: Tetratheca
- Species: T. paucifolia

Binomial name
- Tetratheca paucifolia Joy Thomps., 1976

Species of flowering plant

Tetratheca paucifolia is a species of plant in the quandong family that is endemic to Australia.

== Description ==
The species grows as a leafless or sparsely-leaved, multistemmed shrub to 10–45 cm in height. The pink flowers appear from July to September.

== Distribution and habitat ==
The range of the species lies in the Avon Wheatbelt, Swan Coastal Plain and Geraldton Sandplains IBRA bioregions of south-west Western Australia. The plants grow on sand, clay loam and lateritic soils on slopes and breakaways.
