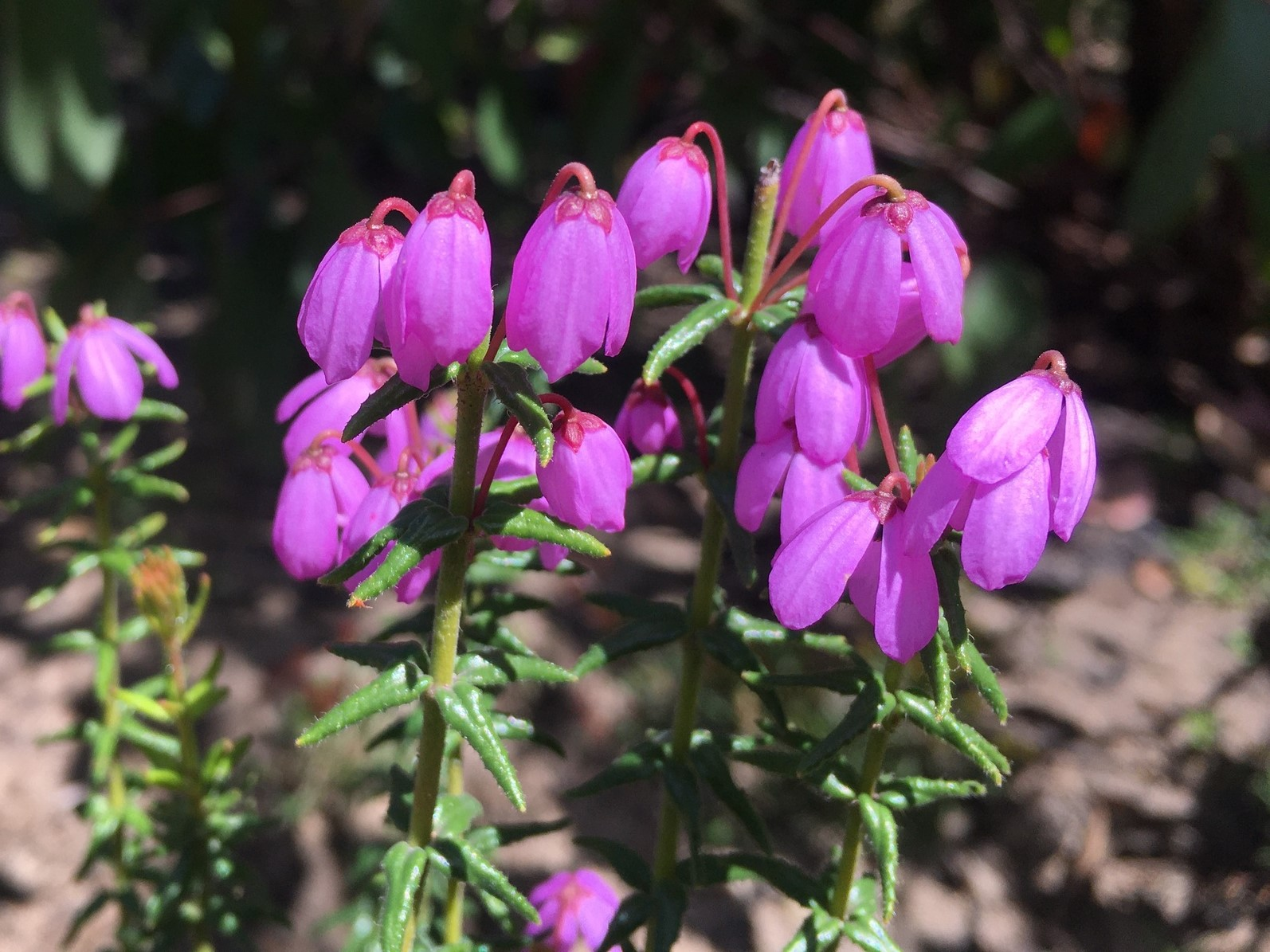

Scientific classification
- Kingdom: Plantae
- Clade: Tracheophytes
- Clade: Angiosperms
- Clade: Eudicots
- Clade: Rosids
- Order: Oxalidales
- Family: Elaeocarpaceae
- Genus: Tetratheca
- Species: T. insularis

Binomial name
- Tetratheca insularis Joy Thomps., 1976

= Tetratheca insularis =

Species of flowering plant

Tetratheca insularis is a species of plant in the quandong family that is endemic to Australia.

== Description ==
The species grows as a compact shrub, usually to 20 cm (sometimes up to 60 cm) in height. The oval leaves are 3–8 mm long and grow in whorls of 3–5. The dark lilac-pink flowers each have four 10–20 mm long petals, appearing from August to December.

== Distribution and habitat ==
The species is endemic to Kangaroo Island, South Australia, where it is found mainly on the western half of the island in mallee shrubland on laterite and ironstone soils, occasionally in Eucalyptus diversifolia mallee on limestone.
