= Tetratheca fasciculata =

Conservation status
- Extinct (EPBC Act)

Scientific classification
- Kingdom: Plantae
- Clade: Tracheophytes
- Clade: Angiosperms
- Clade: Eudicots
- Clade: Rosids
- Order: Oxalidales
- Family: Elaeocarpaceae
- Genus: Tetratheca
- Species: †T. fasciculata

Binomial name
- †Tetratheca fasciculata Joy Thomps., 1976

Species of flowering plant

Tetratheca fasciculata, also known as Cronin's Tetratheca, is an extinct species of plant in the quandong family that was endemic to Australia.

== Description ==
The species grew as a compact shrub less than 20 cm in height. The flowers were pink.

== Distribution and habitat ==
The plant was collected only twice, in the late 19th century, from the Wagin area about 230 km south-east of Perth, in the Avon Wheatbelt IBRA bioregion of south-west Western Australia.
