= Tetratheca parvifolia =

Scientific classification
- Kingdom: Plantae
- Clade: Tracheophytes
- Clade: Angiosperms
- Clade: Eudicots
- Clade: Rosids
- Order: Oxalidales
- Family: Elaeocarpaceae
- Genus: Tetratheca
- Species: T. parvifolia

Binomial name
- Tetratheca parvifolia Joy Thomps., 1976

Species of flowering plant

Tetratheca parvifolia is a species of plant in the quandong family that is endemic to Australia.

== Description ==
The species grows as a small shrub to 20–30 cm in height. The pink flowers appear in October.

== Distribution and habitat ==
The range of the species lies in the Swan Coastal Plain and Jarrah Forest IBRA bioregions of south-west Western Australia.
