= Tetratheca deltoidea =

Conservation status
- Endangered (EPBC Act)

Scientific classification
- Kingdom: Plantae
- Clade: Tracheophytes
- Clade: Angiosperms
- Clade: Eudicots
- Clade: Rosids
- Order: Oxalidales
- Family: Elaeocarpaceae
- Genus: Tetratheca
- Species: T. deltoidea

Binomial name
- Tetratheca deltoidea Joy Thomps., 1976

Species of flowering plant

Tetratheca deltoidea, also known as granite tetratheca, is a species of plant in the quandong family that is endemic to Australia.

== Description ==
The species grows as a scrambling shrub to 1 m in height. The oval leaves are 13 mm long and pale beneath. The strongly-scented dark pink flowers are 10 mm long and 7 mm wide, appearing from August to October.

== Distribution and habitat ==
The known range of the species is limited to a single site in the Mount Caroline Nature Reserve, south-west of Kellerberrin, 200 km east of Perth, in the Avon Wheatbelt IBRA bioregion of south-west Western Australia. It grows in rich, shallow, grey loam soil on a granite outcrop in Eucalyptus caesia woodland with a dense understorey of Grevillea petrophiloides, Gastrolobium spinosum, Lasiopetalum floribundum and Lepidosperma resinosum. The area has hot, dry summers and mild winters, with the average annual rainfall of 250–350 mm falling mainly in winter.

== Conservation ==
The species has been listed as Endangered under Australia's EPBC Act.
