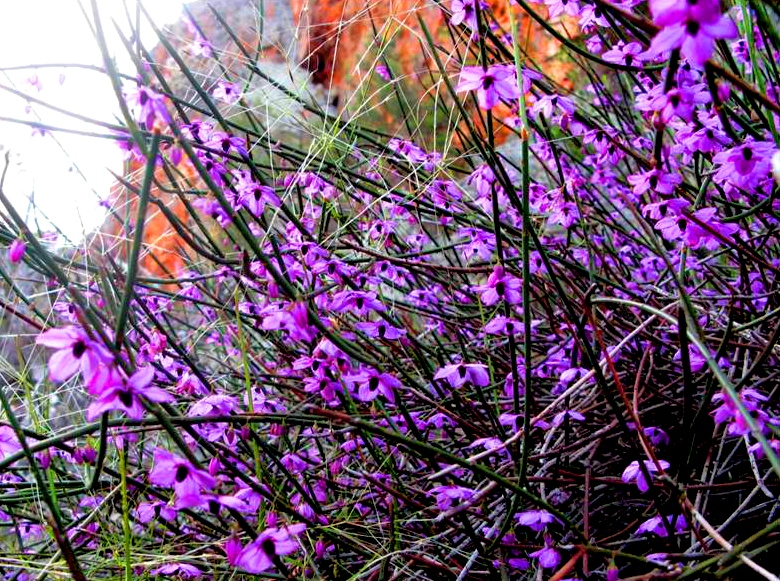
- Flowering shrub

Conservation status
- Vulnerable (EPBC Act)

Scientific classification
- Kingdom: Plantae
- Clade: Tracheophytes
- Clade: Angiosperms
- Clade: Eudicots
- Clade: Rosids
- Order: Oxalidales
- Family: Elaeocarpaceae
- Genus: Tetratheca
- Species: T. aphylla

Binomial name
- Tetratheca aphylla F.Muell., 1882

= Tetratheca aphylla =

Species of flowering plant

Tetratheca aphylla, also known as the Bungalbin Tetratheca, is a species of flowering plant in the quandong family that is endemic to Australia.

== Subspecies ==
- Tetratheca aphylla subsp. aphylla
- Tetratheca aphylla subsp. megacarpa

== Description ==
The species grows as an erect, spreading, leafless shrub to 60 cm in height. The flowers are pink or pink-purple, appearing from September to October.

== Distribution and habitat ==
The range of the species lies within the Coolgardie and Mallee IBRA bioregions of south-west Western Australia, where it occurs in the Helena Aurora Range, 50 km north-north-east of Koolyanobbing, and 80 km east of Newdegate. The plants grow in pockets of skeletal soil among banded iron formations, rock outcrops and debris, in shrubland.

== Conservation ==
The species is listed as Vulnerable under Australia's EPBC Act. The main potential threats are mining activities, inappropriate fire regimes and roadworks.
