= Tetratheca setigera =

Scientific classification
- Kingdom: Plantae
- Clade: Tracheophytes
- Clade: Angiosperms
- Clade: Eudicots
- Clade: Rosids
- Order: Oxalidales
- Family: Elaeocarpaceae
- Genus: Tetratheca
- Species: T. setigera

Binomial name
- Tetratheca setigera Endl., 1837

Synonyms
- Tetratheca elliptica Joy Thomps.; Tetratheca elongata (Steetz) Schuch.; Tetratheca setigera var. elongata Steetz

Species of flowering plant

Tetratheca setigera is a species of plant in the quandong family that is endemic to Australia.

== Description ==
The species grows as an erect or diffuse shrub to 20–80 cm in height. The pink-purple flowers appear from August to December.

== Distribution and habitat ==
The species occurs within the Esperance Plains, Jarrah Forest, Swan Coastal Plain and Warren IBRA bioregions of south-west Western Australia. The plants grow on slopes, flats and swampy areas with sandy and gravelly soils.
