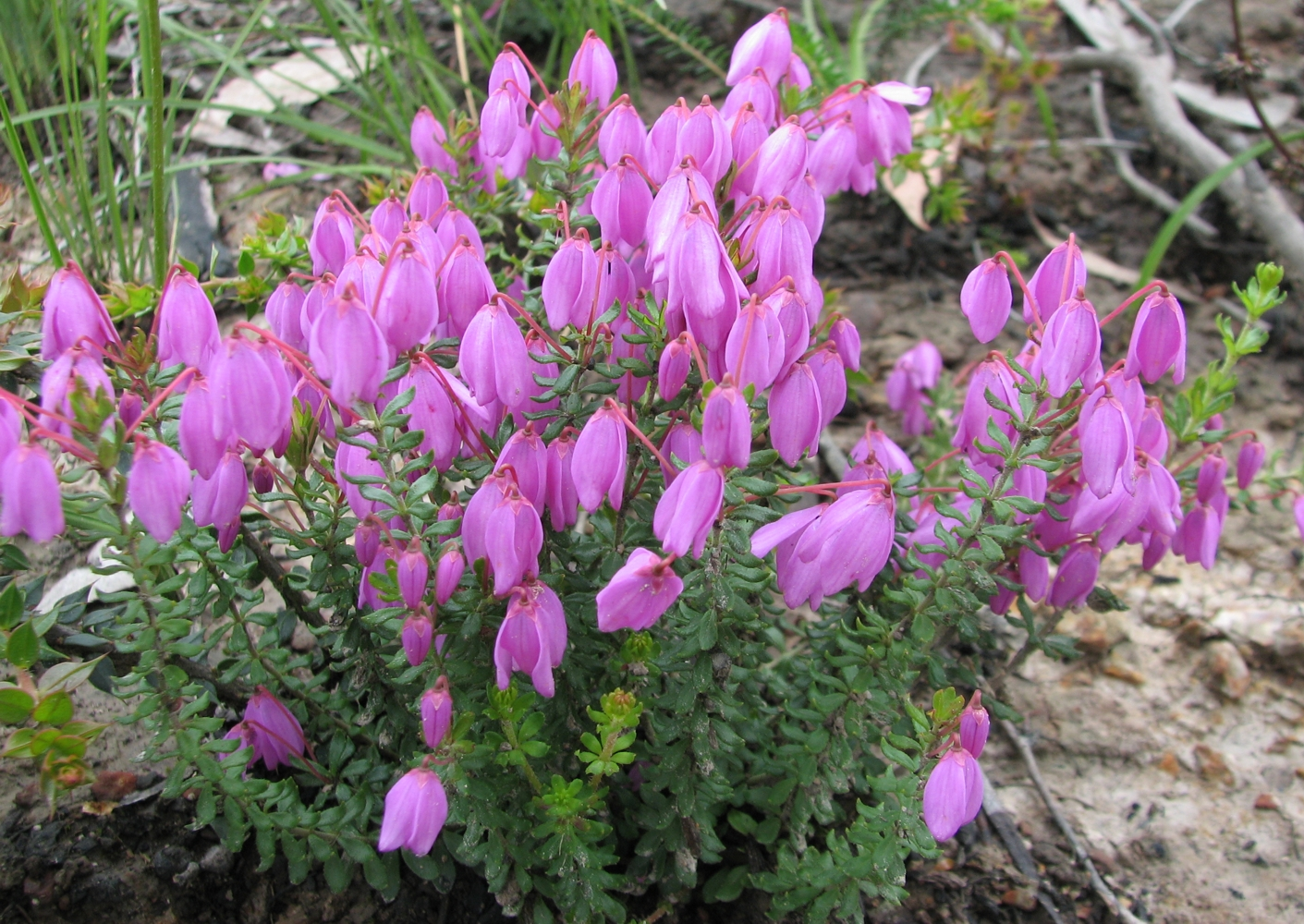
- Tetratheca bauerifolia, Kinglake National Park, Victoria

Scientific classification
- Kingdom: Plantae
- Clade: Tracheophytes
- Clade: Angiosperms
- Clade: Eudicots
- Clade: Rosids
- Order: Oxalidales
- Family: Elaeocarpaceae
- Genus: Tetratheca
- Species: T. bauerifolia

Binomial name
- Tetratheca bauerifolia F.Muell. ex Schuch.

= Tetratheca bauerifolia =

Heath pink-bells

Species of shrub

Tetratheca bauerifolia, commonly known as heath pink-bells, is a flowering plant in the family Elaeocarpaceae and is endemic to eastern Australia. It is a small compact shrub with pink-mauve flowers.

== Description ==
Tetratheca bauerifolia is a small shrub to 30 cm (12 in) high with angled or needle-shaped stems covered with bristly, short, curved or curled hairs usually less than 0.5 mm (0.020 in) long. The leaves are oval to narrow-elliptic shaped, arranged in whorls of 4-6 along the branches, usually 4–10 mm (0.16–0.39 in) long, 2–3 mm (0.079–0.118 in) wide and sessile. The flowers are borne mostly singly on a hooked peduncle, the petals mauve-pink and 6–10 mm (0.24–0.39 in) long with darker, hairless sepals that are 1.5–2 mm (0.059–0.079 in) long. Flowering occurs from September to November and the fruit is heart-shaped to more or less wedge shaped and 5–8 mm (0.20–0.31 in) long.

== Taxonomy ==
Tetratheca bauerifolia was first formally described by Victorian Government Botanist Ferdinand von Mueller in 1853 and the description was published in Synopsis Tremandrearum.

== Distribution and habitat ==
Heath pink-bells grows mostly at higher altitudes in eucalypt forests in rocky locations south of Hill End in New South Wales. A widespread species in eastern Victoria usually in rocky locations or in open forests.
