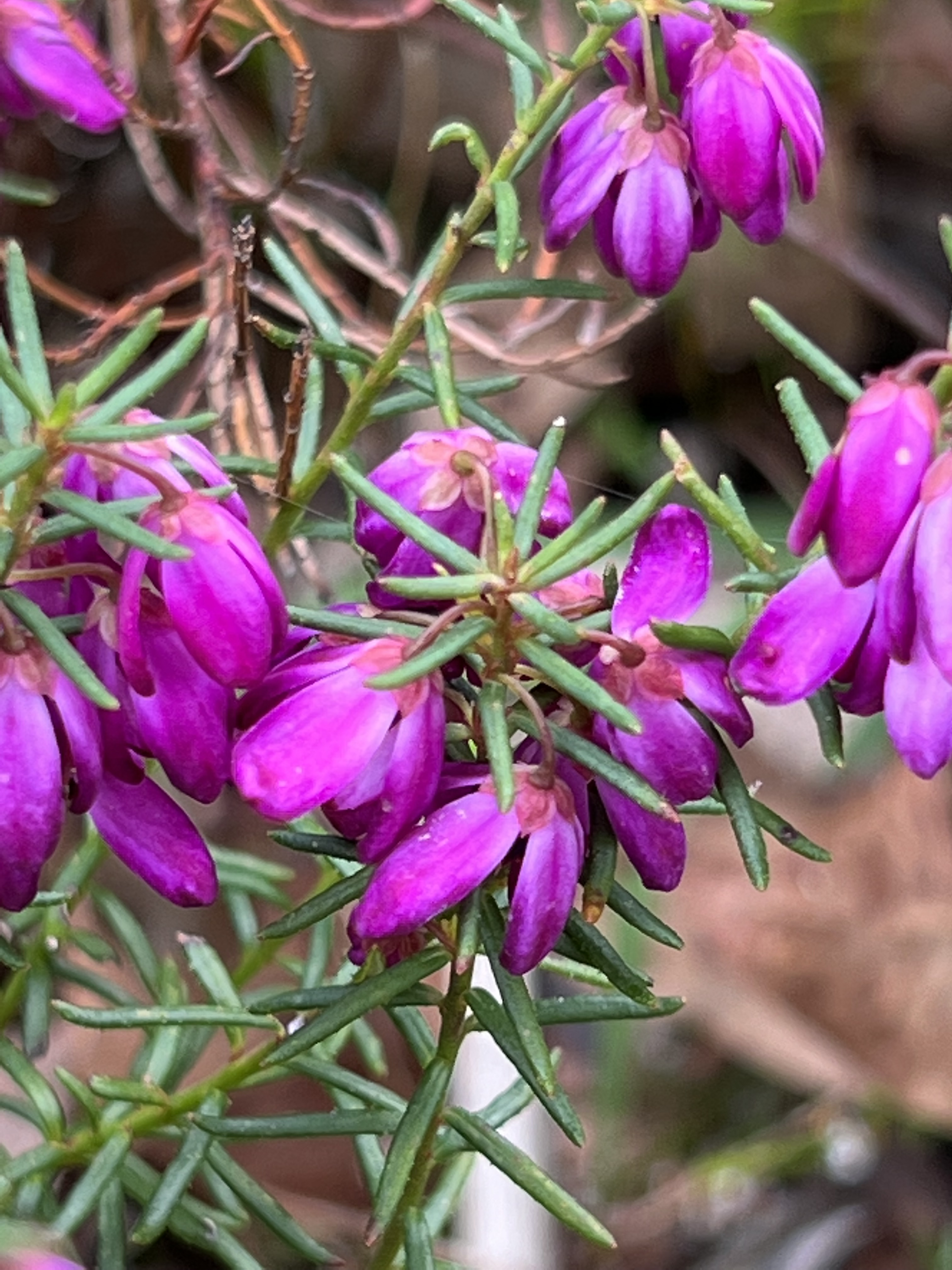

Scientific classification
- Kingdom: Plantae
- Clade: Tracheophytes
- Clade: Angiosperms
- Clade: Eudicots
- Clade: Rosids
- Order: Oxalidales
- Family: Elaeocarpaceae
- Genus: Tetratheca
- Species: T. ericifolia

Binomial name
- Tetratheca ericifolia Sm., 1805

= Tetratheca ericifolia =

Species of flowering plant

Tetratheca ericifolia is a species of flowering plant in the quandong family that is endemic to Australia.

== Description ==
The species grows as a diffuse or compact shrub to 15–40 cm in height, and with stems covered with pale brown bristles. The linear leaves are 3–10 mm long and 1–1.5 mm wide. The flowers are lilac-pink, with petals 5–12.5 mm long, appearing throughout the year, but mainly from July to December.

== Distribution and habitat ==
The species is found from Nabiac southwards to the Nimmitabel area in eastern New South Wales, where the plants grow in heathland and dry sclerophyll forest on sandy soils.
