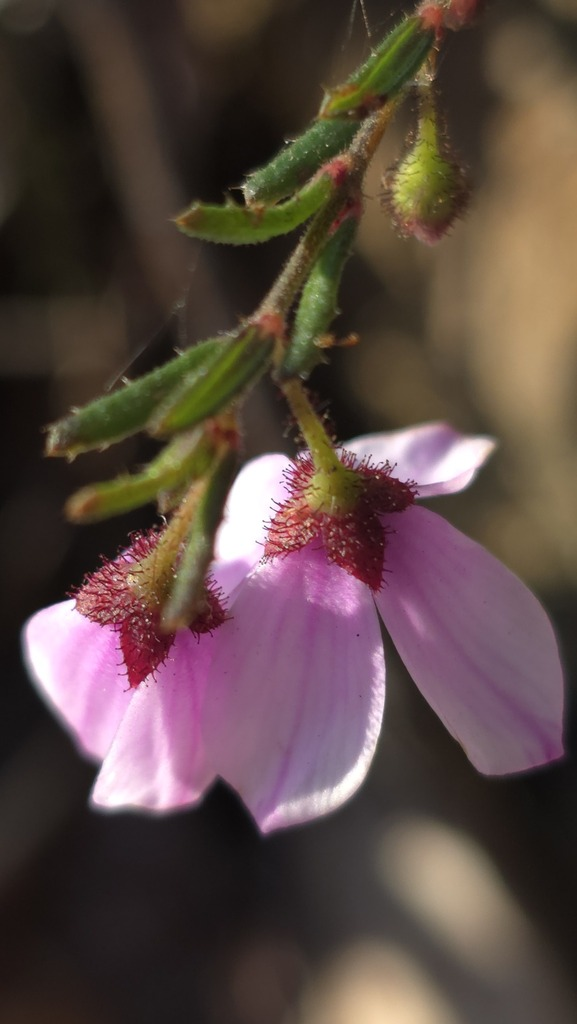

Scientific classification
- Kingdom: Plantae
- Clade: Tracheophytes
- Clade: Angiosperms
- Clade: Eudicots
- Clade: Rosids
- Order: Oxalidales
- Family: Elaeocarpaceae
- Genus: Tetratheca
- Species: T. glandulosa

Binomial name
- Tetratheca glandulosa Sm.

= Tetratheca glandulosa =

Species of shrub

Tetratheca glandulosa, also known as the glandular pink-bell, is a species of spreading shrub in the family Elaeocarpaceae, and is endemic to eastern New South Wales. It grows up to 50cm tall and produces small, deep lilac-pink flowers with four petals. The pedicel (flower stalk) and sepals are covered in distinctive dark red, gland-tipped hairs.

== Description ==
Glandular pink-bell is a small, spreading shrub which grows 20–50 cm (7.9–19.7 in) tall. It has a woody, tuberous root where stems branch out from close to the base. The stems are often entwined among other surrounding plants such as shrubs, grasses and sedges.

The leaves are alternate or opposite or rarely in whorls of three or four. They are linear and 3–20 mm long by 1–2 mm wide with recurved (rolled under) margins and stiff, occasionally gland-tipped hairs which give a "toothed" appearance. The midrib on lower surface is often glandular/hairy and the leaves are sometimes sessile (without a petiole or leaf stem.)

The flowers are mostly solitary (rarely paired) on stalks which are 3–10 mm long and covered with dark red, gland-tipped and tubercle-based hairs which distinguish it from other Tetratheca species. The sepals are 2–3 mm long and persist with the fruit. The deep lilac-pink petals are 4.5–10.5 mm long and also persist in the fruit. The ovary is hairy and there are two ovules. The fruit is 3–7 mm long and the seeds are greater than 3 mm long. Flowering mostly occurs from July to November, however flowers may still be present up until December.

== Distribution and habitat ==
Glandular pink-bell occurs in the Central Coast and Sydney Basin bioregions of New South Wales, Australia. It is found in the Local government areas of The Hills Shire, Gosford, Hawkesbury, Hornsby, Ku-ring-gai, Northern Beaches, Ryde and Wyong. Approximately 150-200 subpopulations are known, with the northernmost limit being in Yengo National Park and the southernmost being in Lane Cove National Park. It occurs as far east as Ingleside and as far inland as Wollemi National Park.

Historical collections of the species are known from areas further south including Manly and Mosman, though these populations are now deemed locally extinct.

It grows in a variety of habitats and soil types, though it is mainly found in shallow, clayey-loam soils in shale-sandstone transition habitat on Hawkesbury sandstone. It occurs on ridgetops and upper slopes in heath, scrub, open woodland and open forest. The largest populations occur in woodland ecological communities which provide a semi-shaded environment. Common woodland tree species associated with glandular pink-bell include eucalypts such as red and yellow bloodwood (Corymbia gummifera and C. eximia), scribbly gum (Eucalyptus haemastoma), grey gum (E. punctata), Snappy gum (E. racemosa) and narrow-leaved stringybark (E. sparsifolia) with an understorey of shrubs in the Proteaceae, Fabaceae and Epacridaceae families. It can also be found with Darwinia biflora, another threatened species, usually as part of the Shale/Sandstone Transition Forest community

== Taxonomy ==
Tetratheca glandulosa was first described by James Edward Smith in 1804. The specific epithet comes from Latin glandulosa, referring to the glandular hairs on the flower sepals and stalk.

== Conservation status ==
Tetratheca glandulosa is listed as "vulnerable" on the Biodiversity Conservation Act 2016 list of threatened species in New South Wales. It is currently not listed on the national EPBC Act List of Threatened Flora. It was removed from this list in December of 2013.

The exact number of mature individual plants is unknown, however it is estimated to be at approximately 11,000. These are scattered across 150-200 isolated subpopulations, where they can be locally rare, with some subpopulations containing as few as 20 plants. Threats to the species include habitat loss through degradation and land clearing, competition with invasive weeds such as African lovegrass (Eragrostis curvula), kikuyu grass (Cenchrus clandestinus) and Coolatai grass (Hyparrhenia hirta), and inappropriate fire regimes.
