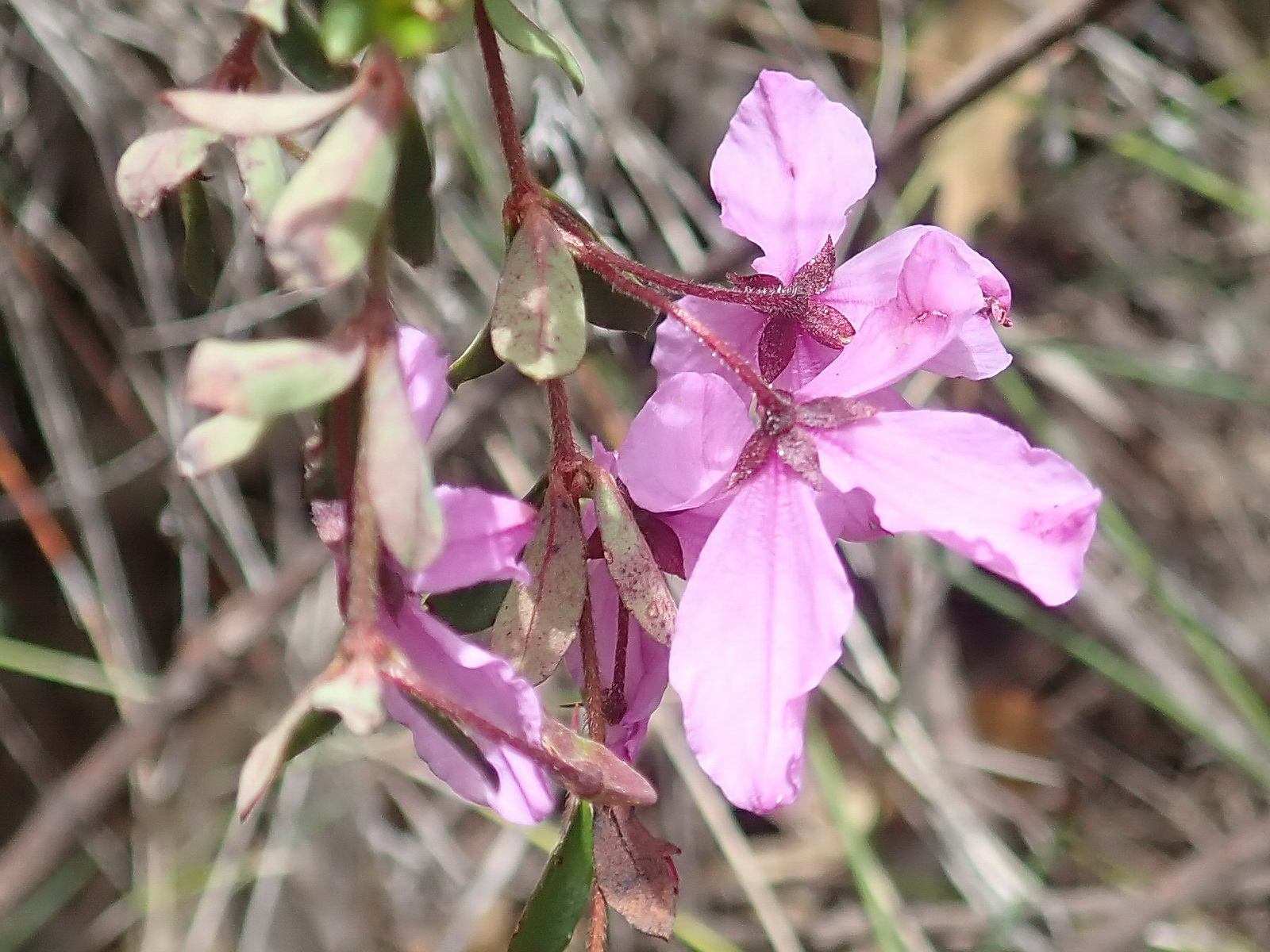
- Flowers

Scientific classification
- Kingdom: Plantae
- Clade: Tracheophytes
- Clade: Angiosperms
- Clade: Eudicots
- Clade: Rosids
- Order: Oxalidales
- Family: Elaeocarpaceae
- Genus: Tetratheca
- Species: T. shiressii

Binomial name
- Tetratheca shiressii Blakely, 1925

= Tetratheca shiressii =

Species of flowering plant

Tetratheca shiressii is a species of flowering plant in the quandong family that is endemic to Australia.

== Description ==
The species grows as a small, ascending or decumbent shrub to 30–75 cm in height. The oval leaves are 4–12 mm long and 6 mm wide. The flowers are deep lilac-pink, with petals 10–20 mm long, appearing mostly from July to October.

== Distribution and habitat ==
The range of the species includes the Watagans and the Bulli area in eastern New South Wales, where the plants grow in heath on sandy, swampy or rocky sites.
