= Tetratheca efoliata =

Scientific classification
- Kingdom: Plantae
- Clade: Tracheophytes
- Clade: Angiosperms
- Clade: Eudicots
- Clade: Rosids
- Order: Oxalidales
- Family: Elaeocarpaceae
- Genus: Tetratheca
- Species: T. efoliata

Binomial name
- Tetratheca efoliata F.Muell., 1876

Species of flowering plant

Tetratheca efoliata is a species of flowering plant in the quandong family that is endemic to Australia.

== Description ==
The species grows as a tangled leafless shrub to 10–40 cm in height. The flowers are pink-purple or white, appearing from July to December.

== Distribution and habitat ==
The range of the species lies within the Avon Wheatbelt, Coolgardie, Esperance Plains and Mallee IBRA bioregions of south-west Western Australia. The plants grow on sandplains on yellow sand and lateritic soils.
