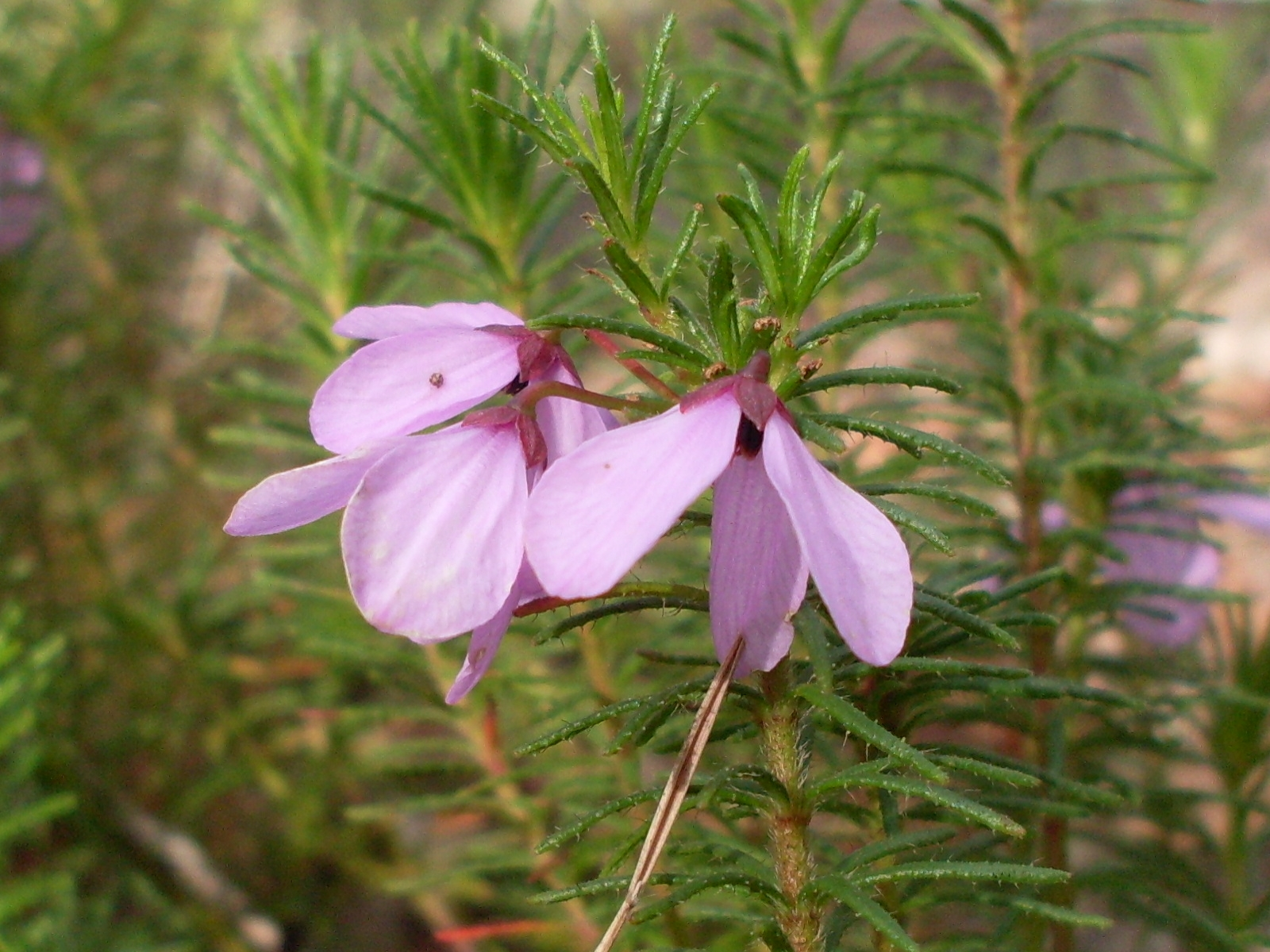
- Flowers

Scientific classification
- Kingdom: Plantae
- Clade: Tracheophytes
- Clade: Angiosperms
- Clade: Eudicots
- Clade: Rosids
- Order: Oxalidales
- Family: Elaeocarpaceae
- Genus: Tetratheca
- Species: T. neglecta

Binomial name
- Tetratheca neglecta Joy Thomps., 1976

= Tetratheca neglecta =

Species of flowering plant

Tetratheca neglecta is a species of plant in the quandong family that is endemic to Australia.

== Description ==
The species grows as a compact or diffuse shrub to 15–60 cm in height. The solitary, deep lilac-pink flowers have petals 5–10 mm long, appearing from August to November.

== Distribution and habitat ==
The plants grow in sandy heath and dry sclerophyll forest in the Sydney district of eastern New South Wales, as far south as Robertson.
