= Tetratheca exasperata =

Scientific classification
- Kingdom: Plantae
- Clade: Tracheophytes
- Clade: Angiosperms
- Clade: Eudicots
- Clade: Rosids
- Order: Oxalidales
- Family: Elaeocarpaceae
- Genus: Tetratheca
- Species: T. exasperata

Binomial name
- Tetratheca exasperata R.Butcher, 2007

Species of flowering plant

Tetratheca exasperata is a species of flowering plant in the quandong family that is endemic to Australia.

== Description ==
The species grows as a small shrub to 10–35 cm in height, with dark pink to pink-purple flowers.

== Distribution and habitat ==
The range of the species lies within the Avon Wheatbelt, Jarrah Forest and Warren IBRA bioregions of south-west Western Australia, some 200–300 km south to south-east of the city of Perth. The plants grow on white-grey sand, sandy loam, and orange-brown gravelly loam soils.
