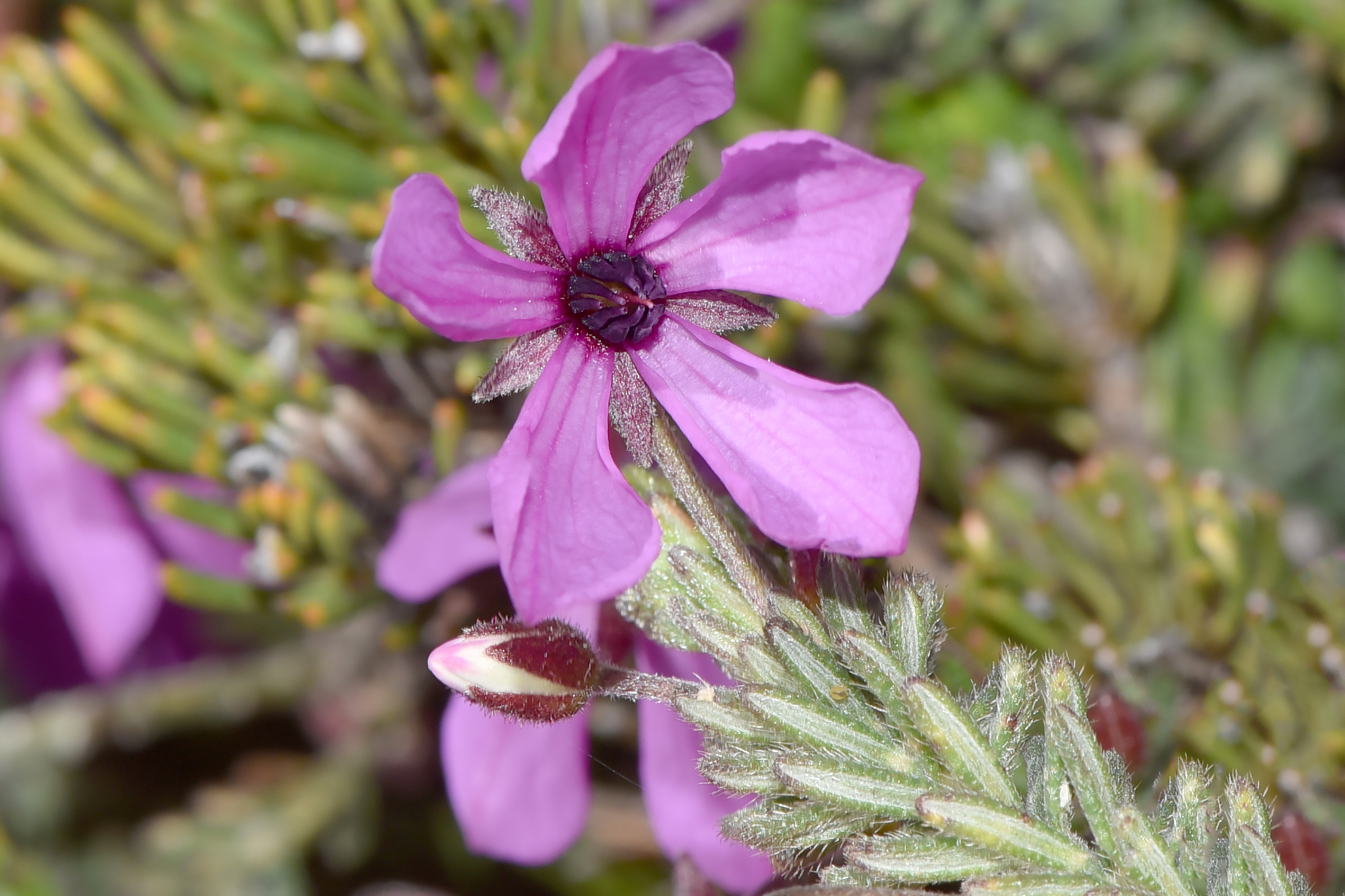

Scientific classification
- Kingdom: Plantae
- Clade: Tracheophytes
- Clade: Angiosperms
- Clade: Eudicots
- Clade: Rosids
- Order: Oxalidales
- Family: Elaeocarpaceae
- Genus: Tetratheca
- Species: T. confertifolia

Binomial name
- Tetratheca confertifolia Steetz, 1845

= Tetratheca confertifolia =

Species of flowering plant

Tetratheca confertifolia is a species of flowering plant in the quandong family that is endemic to Australia.

== Description ==
The species grows as an erect (rarely decumbent) shrub to 10–30 cm in height. The pink or white flowers appear from August to December. It's conservation code is 'Not Threatened' as per 'Conservation Codes applied to plants in Western Australia'.

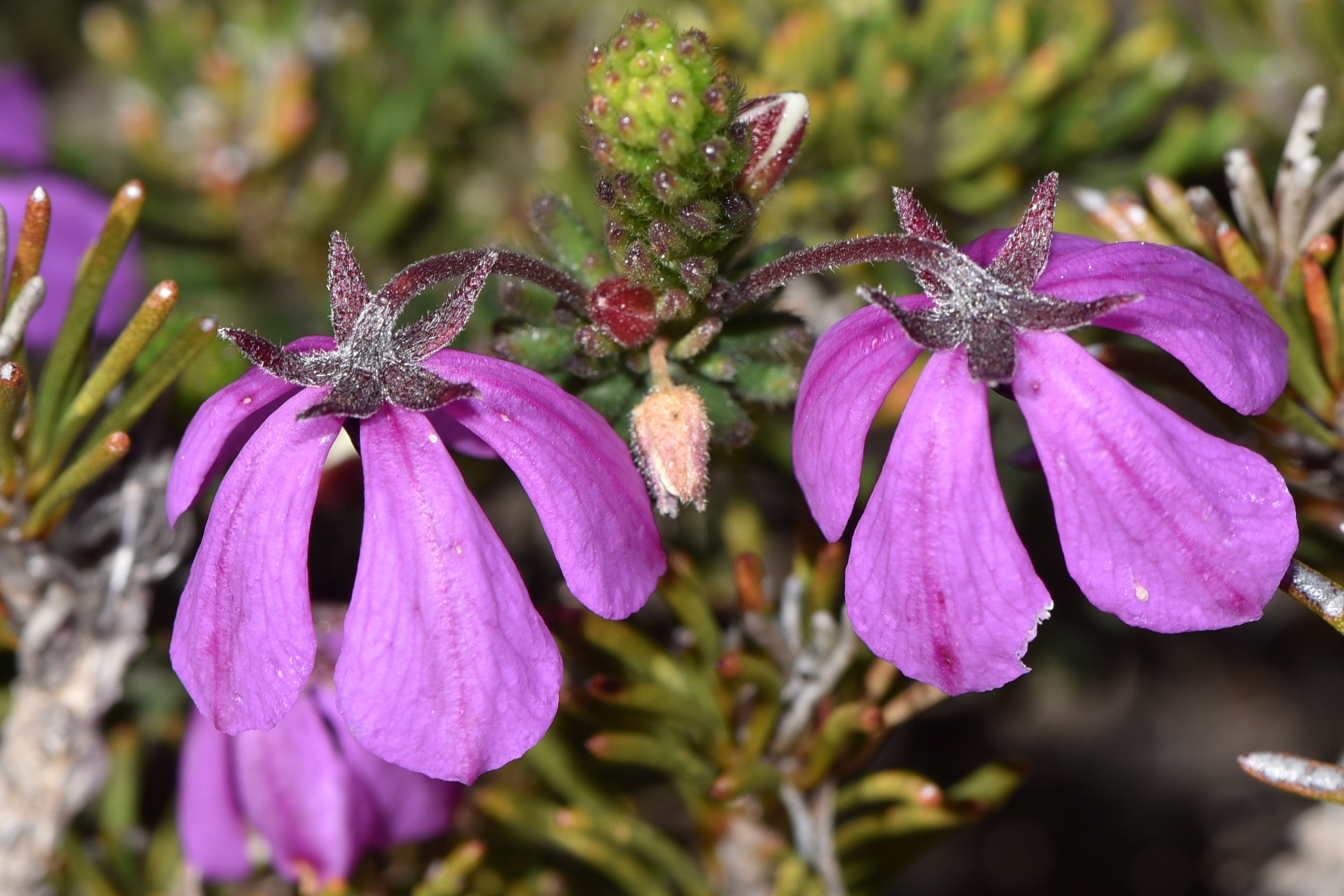
Two Tetratheca confertifolia flowers with characteristic pink petals.

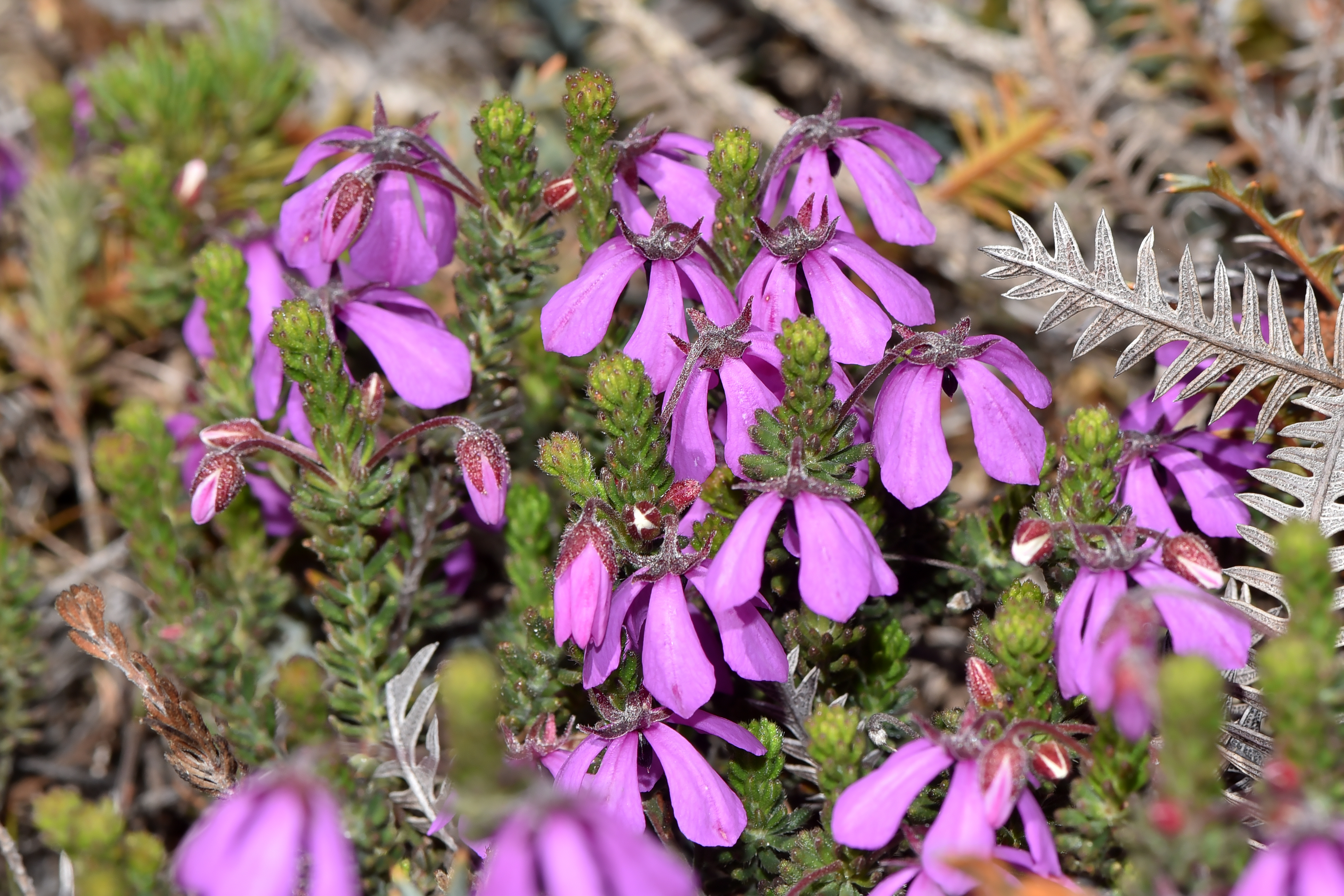
A cluster of Tetratheca confertifolia flowers growing in a natural setting.

== Distribution and habitat ==
The range of the species lies within the Avon Wheatbelt, Geraldton Sandplains, Jarrah Forest, Mallee and Swan Coastal Plain IBRA bioregions of south-west Western Australia.

Dandaragan Plateau, Geraldton Hills, Katanning, Lesueur Sandplain, Merredin, Northern Jarrah Forest, Western Mallee are IBRA subregion it is found in. The plants grow on sandy and lateritic soils.
