= Tetratheca pubescens =

Scientific classification
- Kingdom: Plantae
- Clade: Tracheophytes
- Clade: Angiosperms
- Clade: Eudicots
- Clade: Rosids
- Order: Oxalidales
- Family: Elaeocarpaceae
- Genus: Tetratheca
- Species: T. pubescens

Binomial name
- Tetratheca pubescens Turcz., 1852

Species of flowering plant

Tetratheca pubescens is a species of flowering plant in the Elaeocarpaceae family that is endemic to Australia. It grows as a slender shrub to 60 cm in height. The flowers are white, pink or purple. It grows within the Esperance Plains, Jarrah Forest and Mallee IBRA bioregions of southwest Western Australia, on rocky hillsides, gullies and creekbanks of sand, loam or clay.
