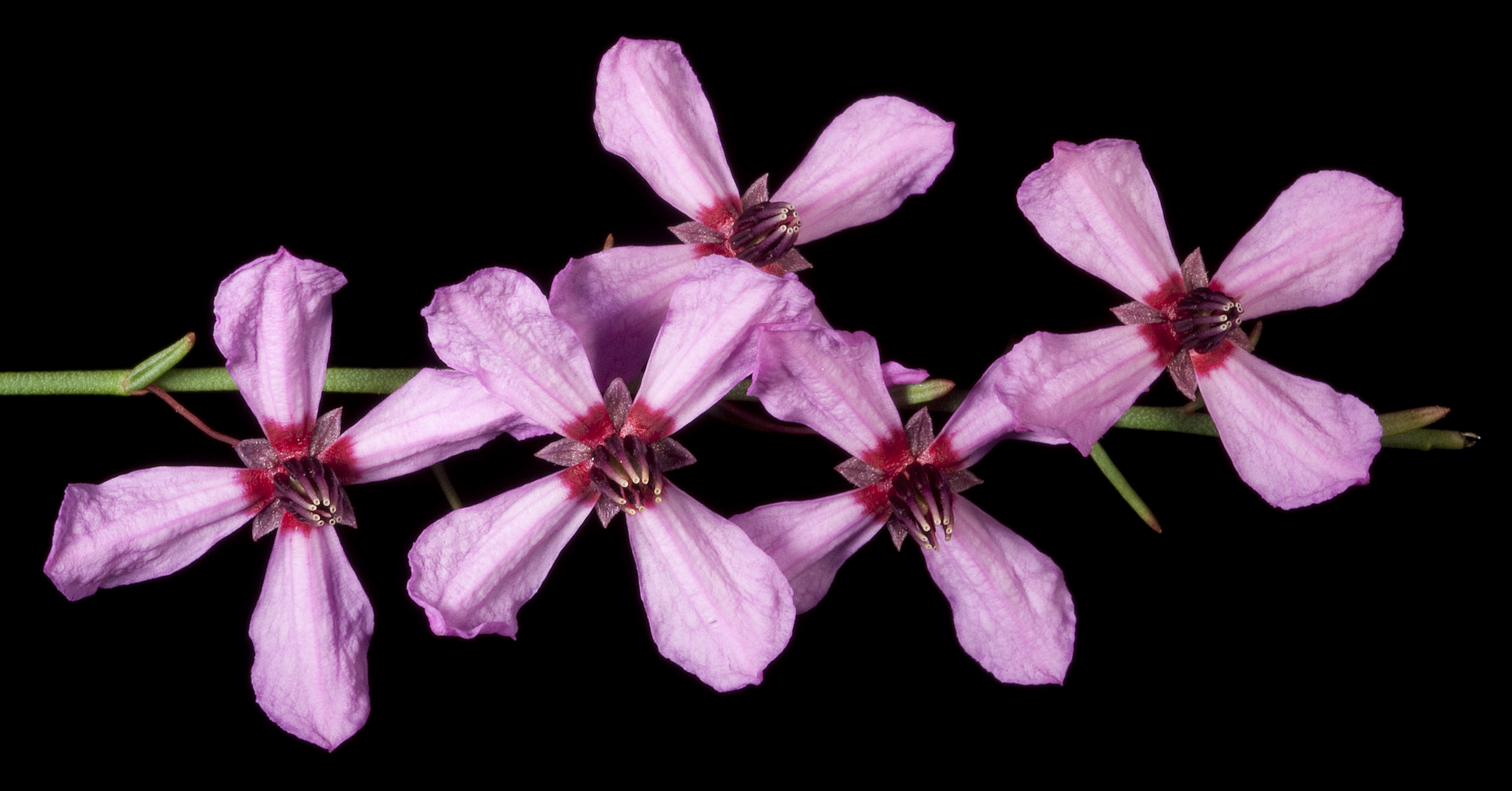
- Flowers

Scientific classification
- Kingdom: Plantae
- Clade: Tracheophytes
- Clade: Angiosperms
- Clade: Eudicots
- Clade: Rosids
- Order: Oxalidales
- Family: Elaeocarpaceae
- Genus: Tetratheca
- Species: T. virgata

Binomial name
- Tetratheca virgata Steetz, 1845

= Tetratheca virgata =

Species of flowering plant

Tetratheca virgata is a species of plant in the quandong family that is endemic to Australia.

== Description ==
The species grows as a slender, spreading shrub to 10–45 cm in height. The pink-purple flowers appear from September to November.

== Distribution and habitat ==
The species occurs within the Avon Wheatbelt and Jarrah Forest IBRA bioregions of south-west Western Australia. The plants grow on sandy, gravelly and clay soils.
