= Tetratheca filiformis =

Conservation status
- Delisted (DEC)

Scientific classification
- Kingdom: Plantae
- Clade: Tracheophytes
- Clade: Angiosperms
- Clade: Eudicots
- Clade: Rosids
- Order: Oxalidales
- Family: Elaeocarpaceae
- Genus: Tetratheca
- Species: T. filiformis

Binomial name
- Tetratheca filiformis Benth., 1863

Species of flowering plant

Tetratheca filiformis is a species of flowering plant in the quandong family that is endemic to Australia.

== Description ==
The species grows as a diffuse to prostrate shrub to 40 cm in height. The flowers are pink-purple, appearing from October to January.

== Distribution and habitat ==
The range of the species lies within the Jarrah Forest and Warren IBRA bioregions of south-west Western Australia in the local government areas of Augusta–Margaret River, Denmark, Manjimup and Nannup. The plants grow in damp, sandy areas with winter wet season rainfall.
