= Tetratheca juncea =

Conservation status
- Vulnerable (EPBC Act)

Scientific classification
- Kingdom: Plantae
- Clade: Tracheophytes
- Clade: Angiosperms
- Clade: Eudicots
- Clade: Rosids
- Order: Oxalidales
- Family: Elaeocarpaceae
- Genus: Tetratheca
- Species: T. juncea

Binomial name
- Tetratheca juncea Sm.

Species of shrub

Tetratheca juncea, commonly known as black-eyed Susan or pink bells, is a small shrub in the family Elaeocarpaceae. Endemic to New South Wales, it is not related to other plants known as Black-eyed Susan around the world.

== Description ==
Tetratheca juncea has a sprawling habit with stems, usually leafless, between 30 and 60 cm long. Stems usually have 2 to 3 narrow wings which can distinguish the plant from other Tetratheca species. Its four petalled flowers face downward and vary from white to pink to dark purple in colour.

Tetratheca juncea reproduces by spreading underground stems up to 50 cm or sexually, however this requires pollination by insects.

== Distribution and habitat ==
It is found largely in the grassy groundcover of low open forest/woodland with a mixed shrub understorey. This plant prefers cooler southerly aspects and well-drained soils, thus often occurring on ridges.

The vulnerable status of T. juncea reflects its confinement to a small area in the northern part of the Sydney Basin bioregion and the southern part of the North Coast bioregion. Within that area, however, the plant is quite plentiful. Larger populations are considered especially important for the conservation of this species.
