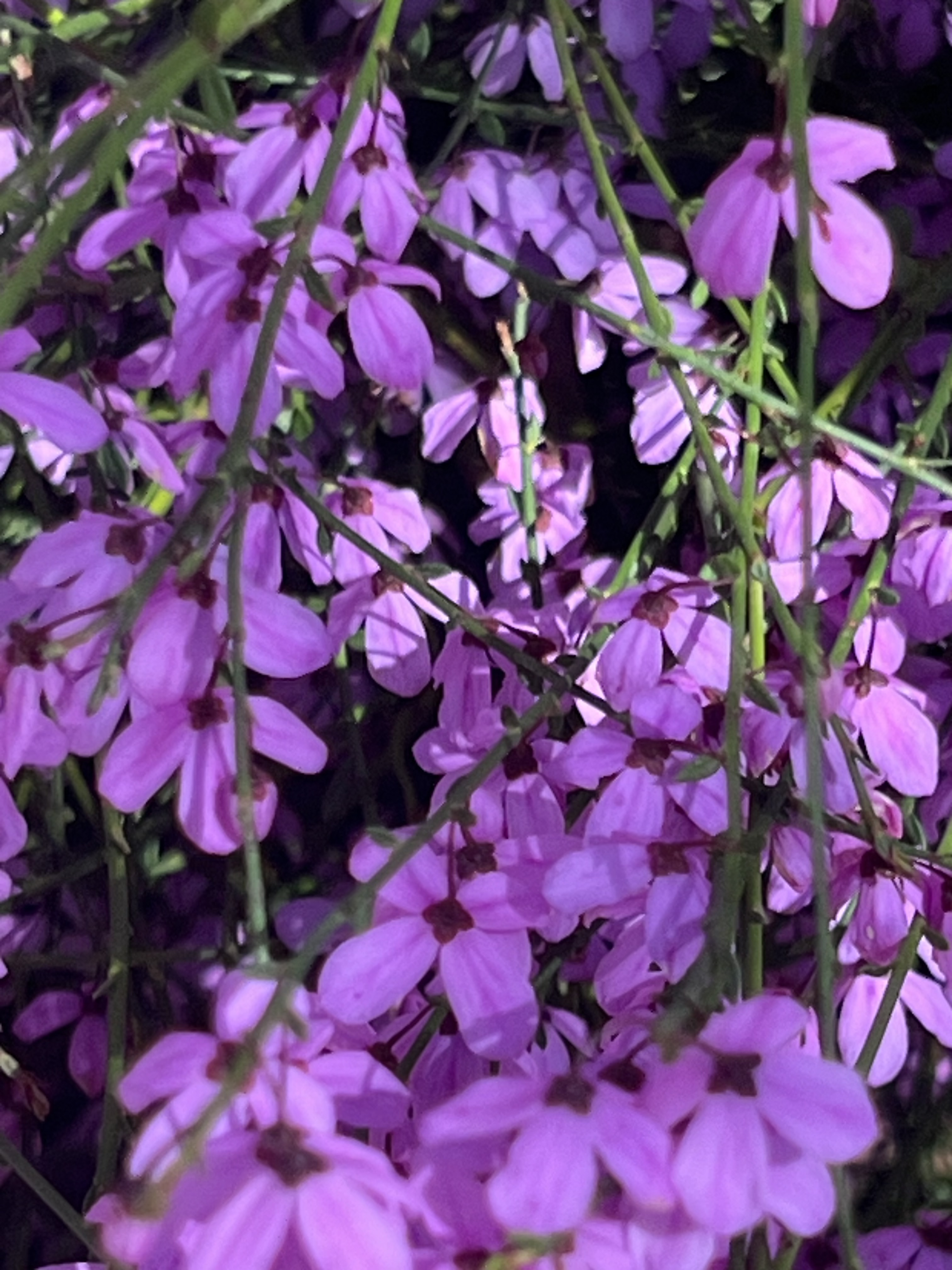

Scientific classification
- Kingdom: Plantae
- Clade: Tracheophytes
- Clade: Angiosperms
- Clade: Eudicots
- Clade: Rosids
- Order: Oxalidales
- Family: Elaeocarpaceae
- Genus: Tetratheca
- Species: T. subaphylla

Binomial name
- Tetratheca subaphylla Benth., 1863

= Tetratheca subaphylla =

Leafless pink-bells

Species of flowering plant

Tetratheca subaphylla, also known as leafless pink-bells, is a species of flowering plant in the quandong family that is endemic to Australia.

== Description ==
The species grows as a straggling or semi-prostrate shrub to 80 cm in length. The leaves are reduced to scales 1–3 mm long. The flowers are deep lilac-pink, with petals 4–10 mm long, appearing from August to February.

== Distribution and habitat ==
The range of the species includes south-eastern New South Wales and East Gippsland in Victoria, where the plants grow on rocky hillsides in eucalypt forest.
