= Tetratheca affinis =

Scientific classification
- Kingdom: Plantae
- Clade: Tracheophytes
- Clade: Angiosperms
- Clade: Eudicots
- Clade: Rosids
- Order: Oxalidales
- Family: Elaeocarpaceae
- Genus: Tetratheca
- Species: T. affinis

Binomial name
- Tetratheca affinis Endl., 1837

Species of flowering plant

Tetratheca affinis is a species of plant in the quandong family that is endemic to Australia.

== Description ==
The species grows as an erect, open and leafless shrub to 10–70 cm (occasionally up to a metre) in height. The pink-purple flowers appear from August to November.

== Distribution and habitat ==
The species occurs within the Avon Wheatbelt, Esperance Plains, Jarrah Forest, Mallee and Warren IBRA bioregions of south-west Western Australia. The plants grow on slopes, flats and swamp edges with sandy and lateritic soils.
