= Tetratheca rubioides =

Scientific classification
- Kingdom: Plantae
- Clade: Tracheophytes
- Clade: Angiosperms
- Clade: Eudicots
- Clade: Rosids
- Order: Oxalidales
- Family: Elaeocarpaceae
- Genus: Tetratheca
- Species: T. rubioides

Binomial name
- Tetratheca rubioides A.Cunn., 1825

Species of flowering plant

Tetratheca rubioides is a species of flowering plant in the quandong family that is endemic to Australia.

== Description ==
The species grows as a compact shrub to 30–60 cm in height. The linear leaves are 3–15 mm long and 1 mm wide. The flowers are deep lilac-pink, with petals 5–11 mm long, appearing mostly from October to November.

== Distribution and habitat ==
The range of the species extends from the Blue Mountains to the Braidwood district in eastern New South Wales, where the plants grow in heath and sclerophyll forest on sandstone.
