= Acacia shapelleae =

Shapelle's wattle

Conservation status
- Declared rare (DEC)

Scientific classification
- Kingdom: Plantae
- Clade: Tracheophytes
- Clade: Angiosperms
- Clade: Eudicots
- Clade: Rosids
- Order: Fabales
- Family: Fabaceae
- Subfamily: Caesalpinioideae
- Clade: Mimosoid clade
- Genus: Acacia
- Species: A. shapelleae

Binomial name
- Acacia shapelleae Maslin

Species of legume

Acacia shapelleae is a shrub of the genus Acacia, also known as Shapelle's wattle, that is native to Western Australia and is found in a small area within the Mount Manning Range Nature Reserve.

== See also ==
- List of Acacia species
