= Tetratheca pilata =

Scientific classification
- Kingdom: Plantae
- Clade: Tracheophytes
- Clade: Angiosperms
- Clade: Eudicots
- Clade: Rosids
- Order: Oxalidales
- Family: Elaeocarpaceae
- Genus: Tetratheca
- Species: T. pilata

Binomial name
- Tetratheca pilata R.Butcher, 2007

Species of flowering plant

Tetratheca pilata is a species of plant in the quandong family that is endemic to Australia.

== Description ==
The species grows as a small multistemmed shrub to 20–30 cm in height, with pale pink flowers.

== Distribution and habitat ==
The range of the species lies within the Esperance Plains IBRA bioregion of south-west Western Australia in a small area south of the town of Ongerup. The plants grow on rocky outcrops with granitic loam soils.
