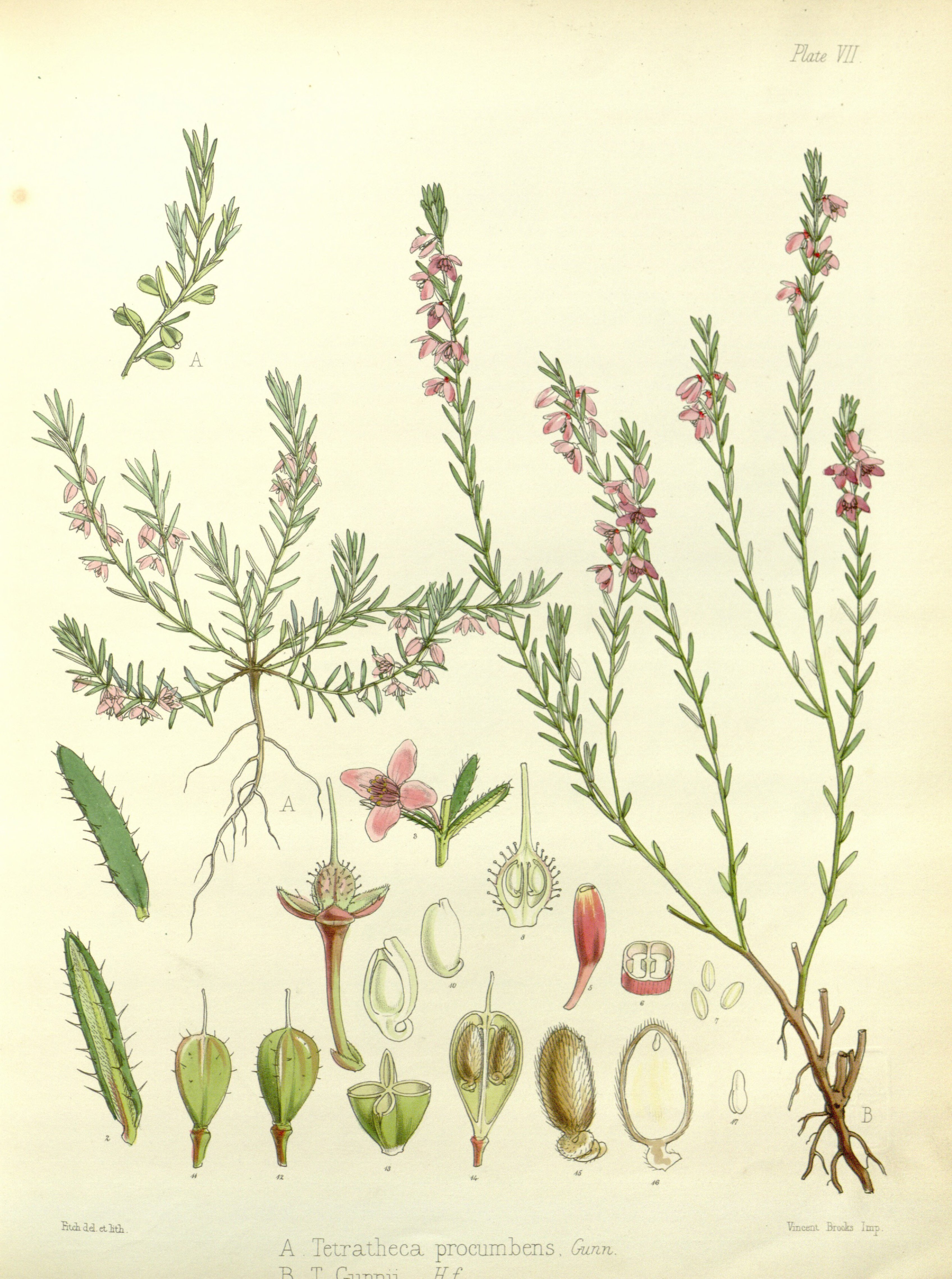
- 19th century botanical illustration by Walter Hood Fitch

Scientific classification
- Kingdom: Plantae
- Clade: Tracheophytes
- Clade: Angiosperms
- Clade: Eudicots
- Clade: Rosids
- Order: Oxalidales
- Family: Elaeocarpaceae
- Genus: Tetratheca
- Species: T. procumbens

Binomial name
- Tetratheca procumbens Gunn ex Hook.f., 1855

= Tetratheca procumbens =

Species of flowering plant

Tetratheca procumbens, also known as mountain pink-bells, is a species of flowering plant in the quandong family that is endemic to Australia.

== Description ==
The species grows as a small, procumbent to weakly ascending shrub to 5–30 cm in height. The linear leaves are 2–8 mm long and 0.5–2 mm wide. The flowers are lilac-pink or white, with petals 3–5 mm long, appearing from October to December.

== Distribution and habitat ==
The species is found in Victoria, in mountain country north of Heyfield, as well as in Tasmania, where the plants grow in low subalpine heathland on peat soils or sphagnum near bogs and streams.
