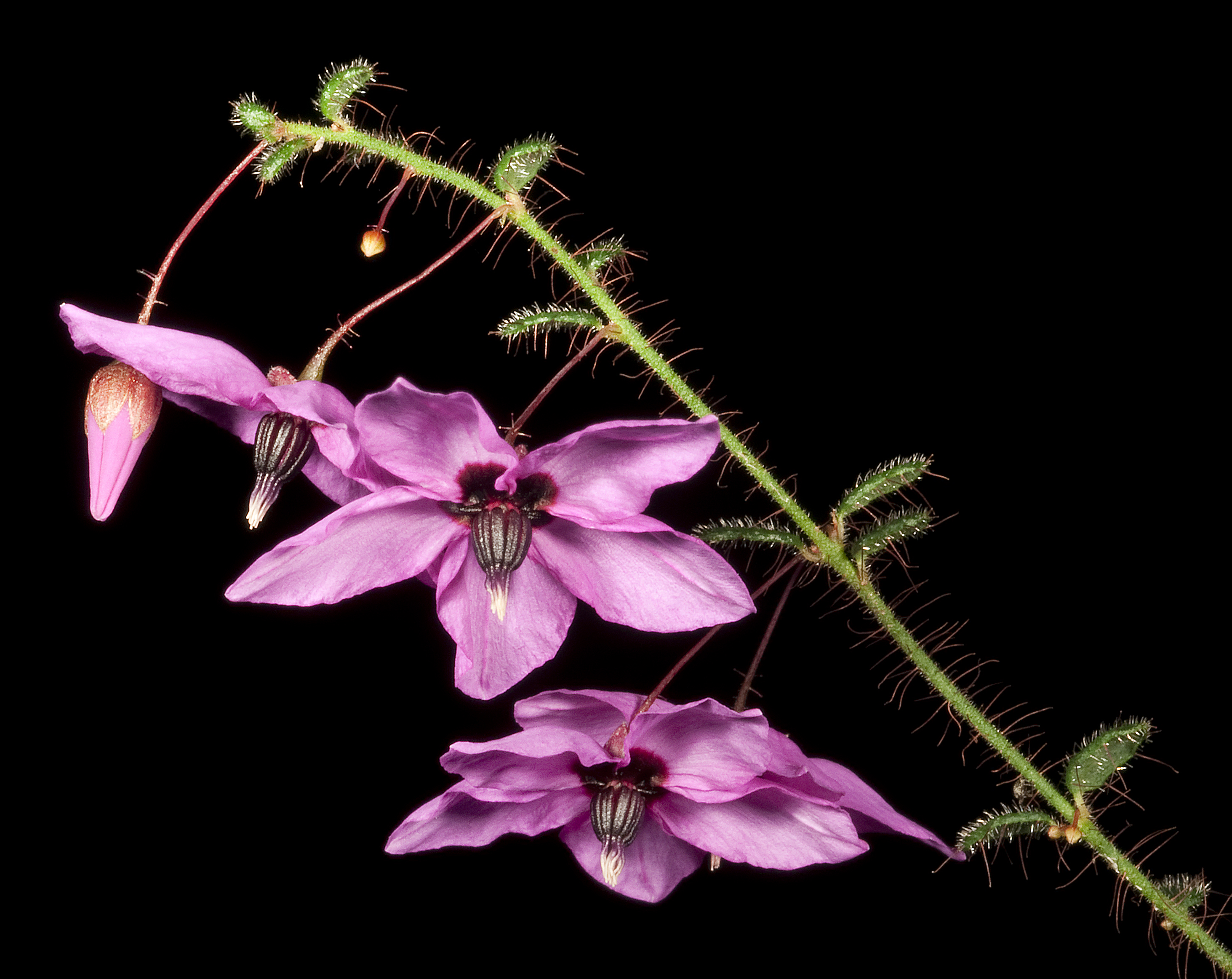

Scientific classification
- Kingdom: Plantae
- Clade: Tracheophytes
- Clade: Angiosperms
- Clade: Eudicots
- Clade: Rosids
- Order: Oxalidales
- Family: Elaeocarpaceae
- Genus: Tetratheca
- Species: T. hispidissima

Binomial name
- Tetratheca hispidissima Steetz

= Tetratheca hispidissima =

Species of shrub

Tetratheca hispidissima is an erect spreading or straggling shrub in the family Elaeocarpaceae. It is endemic to Western Australia. It grows from 0.3 m to 0.8 m high, on sandy, clayey and gravel soils on river flats and on lateritic ridges. Its pink to purple flowers may be seen from September to December.

It was first described by Joachim Steetz in 1845. There are no synonyms.

The specific epithet, hispidissima, is a superlative derived from the Latin, hispidus, meaning "hispid", "covered with coarse rigid erect hairs or bristles harsh to the touch", and thus describes the plant as being "most hairy".
