= Yilgarn (disambiguation) =

Yilgarn is a large craton which constitutes the bulk of the Western Australian land mass.

Yilgarn may also refer to:

- Shire of Yilgarn, an administrative area in Western Australia
- Yilgarn Land District, a land district in Western Australia
- Yilgarn River (Western Australia)
- Electoral district of Yilgarn (1894-1930), a former electoral district of Western Australia
- Yilgarn Goldfield, one of the Western Australian Goldfields
- Yilgarn Railway, original name of the Eastern Goldfields Railway

== See also ==
- Australian gold rushes#1887 The Yilgarn and 1888 Southern Cross
- Electoral district of Merredin-Yilgarn (1950-2008), a former electoral district of Western Australia
- Electoral district of Yilgarn-Coolgardie (1930-1950), a former electoral district of Western Australia
- Electoral district of Yilgarn-Dundas (1977-1983), a former electoral district of Western Australia
- Northern Yilgarn, an area in Western Australia
- Yilgarn Star Gold Mine
