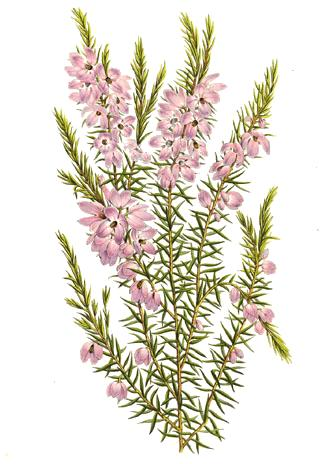

Scientific classification
- Kingdom: Plantae
- Clade: Embryophytes
- Clade: Tracheophytes
- Clade: Angiosperms
- Clade: Eudicots
- Clade: Rosids
- Order: Oxalidales
- Family: Elaeocarpaceae
- Genus: Tetratheca
- Species: T. pilosa

Binomial name
- Tetratheca pilosa Labill.

= Tetratheca pilosa =

Species of flowering plant

Tetratheca pilosa is a flowering plant in the family Elaeocarpaceae, endemic to Australia. It is a small shrub found in dry sclerophyll forests, open heathlands and woodlands of Australia. It was first recorded in 1805 by French botanist Jacques Labillardière.

== Description ==
Characterized by pink to mauve drooping (pendulous), auxiliary, solitary flowers, which are radially symmetrical, consisting of 4 sepals and 4 petals, 6 mm long. Stamens usually 8, opening by an apical pore and form a dark center to the flower above a superior ovary. Stamen tube widest between the base and the apex and are often hidden by the petals, hence the common name black eyed susan. Stems are erect, unbranched or branched from the base. Leaves are green, narrow, distinctly alternate and slightly revolute or with recurved margins. Leaves can be hairless or have non-glandular hairs. Up to 15 mm in length. Tetratheca fruit have locules that dehisce as the fruit desiccates, releasing 1 to 5 seeds.

== Distribution ==
Tetratheca pilosa is one of a few Tetratheca species that occurs in multiple states across Australia (most other species are locally endemic). It is found in Tasmania, Victoria, the south east corner of South Australia and in a few localised patches in New South Wales.

== Ecology ==
The species exists in open woodland, heathland and dry sclerophyll forests. The vegetation structure generally consists of a sparse understorey and an open canopy of Eucalyptus. Depending on substrate the canopy trees may be dominated by E. amygdalina, E. delegatensis or E. obliqua. A sparse understorey of Banksia marginata and Exocarpus cupressiformis is common. T. pilosa grows sparsely amongst other woody shrub species such as Epacris impressa, Pultenaea juniperina, Davisea latifolia. Ground cover usually consists of a sparse layer of Gonocarpus teucroides and a high coverage of fine litter and rocks.

T. pilosa does poorly when competing with other plants, but has a strong advantage in sandy, gravely, hydrophobic, acidic and nutrient poor soils. It persists on sandstone, Permian mudstone and siltstone and soils of granitic origins.

The black centre creates a target for native bees which are capable of buzz pollination. Buzz pollination requires the bee to use their flight mascles to vibrate the pollen loose, a skill which European bees do not have. Only 9% of the world plants use this form of pollination.

Tetratheca seeds are a food source for ants which collect, disperse and take the seed underground. This has multiple advantages for the plant, creating a soil seed store, protected from fire and dispersed further than wind may be able to carry the seed.
