= Tetratheca nephelioides =

Conservation status
- Critically endangered (EPBC Act)

Scientific classification
- Kingdom: Plantae
- Clade: Tracheophytes
- Clade: Angiosperms
- Clade: Eudicots
- Clade: Rosids
- Order: Oxalidales
- Family: Elaeocarpaceae
- Genus: Tetratheca
- Species: T. nephelioides

Binomial name
- Tetratheca nephelioides R.Butcher, 2007

Species of flowering plant

Tetratheca nephelioides is a species of plant in the quandong family that is endemic to Australia.

== Description ==
The species grows as a small, erect, clumped shrub to 40 cm in height and 80 cm wide. The deep mauve to magenta flowers appear in September.

== Distribution and habitat ==
The range of the species lies within the Geraldton Sandplains IBRA bioregion of south-west Western Australia, some 240 km north of the city of Perth near the town of Eneabba. The plants grow on sandy, clayey, gravelly and lateritic soils.

== Conservation ==
The species has been listed as Critically Endangered under Australia's EPBC Act. Threats include disturbance from power line and firebreak maintenance activities.
