= Tetratheca paynterae =

Conservation status
- Endangered (EPBC Act)

Scientific classification
- Kingdom: Plantae
- Clade: Tracheophytes
- Clade: Angiosperms
- Clade: Eudicots
- Clade: Rosids
- Order: Oxalidales
- Family: Elaeocarpaceae
- Genus: Tetratheca
- Species: T. paynterae

Binomial name
- Tetratheca paynterae Alford, 1995

Species of flowering plant

Tetratheca paynterae, also known as Paynter's Tetratheca, is a species of plant in the quandong family that is endemic to Australia. There are two recognised subspecies.

== Subspecies ==
- T. paynterae subsp. paynterae
- T. paynterae subsp. cremnobata

== Description ==
The species grows as an erect or spreading shrub to 0.15–1 m in height. The leaves are 0.8–2.5 mm long and less than a millimetre wide. The flowers occur in clusters, each flower having five petals 5–13 mm long and 3–8 mm wide, deep pink in colour with a yellow spot at the base. The fruits are 5–8 mm long and 4–6 mm wide. Peak flowering takes place from September to November.

== Distribution and habitat ==
The known range of the species is limited to two sites 80–110 km north of Koolyanobbing in the Coolgardie IBRA bioregion of Western Australia. It grows in sparse, open scrub, in shallow pockets of red loam soil in rock crevices and on cliffs and ridges in exposed areas on banded ironstone hills.

== Conservation ==
The species has been listed as Endangered under Australia's EPBC Act.
