= Swainsona tanamiensis =

Scientific classification
- Kingdom: Plantae
- Clade: Tracheophytes
- Clade: Angiosperms
- Clade: Eudicots
- Clade: Rosids
- Order: Fabales
- Family: Fabaceae
- Subfamily: Faboideae
- Genus: Swainsona
- Species: S. tanamiensis

Binomial name
- Swainsona tanamiensis Joy Thomps.

Species of plant

Swainsona tanamiensis is a species of flowering plant in the family Fabaceae and is endemic to north-western Australia. It is a prostrate or erect perennial plant with imparipinnate leaves with 5 to 13 broadly egg-shaped to elliptic, or almost round leaflets, and racemes of up to 8 purple flowers.

== Description ==
Swainsona tanamiensis is a prostrate or erect perennial plant that typically grows to a height of up to about 25 cm (9.8 in), and has many hairy stems. Its leaves are imparipinnate, about 30–80 mm (1.2–3.1 in) long with 5 to 13 broadly egg-shaped to elliptic or almost round leaflets, the side leaflets mostly 1–15 mm (0.039–0.591 in) long and 3–8 mm (0.12–0.31 in) wide. There is a stipule mostly about 8 mm (0.31 in) long at the base of the petiole. The flowers are arranged in racemes 20–120 mm (0.79–4.72 in) long with up to 8 flowers on a peduncle 0.5–1.0 mm (0.020–0.039 in) wide, each flower about 15 mm (0.59 in) long on a pedicel about 2–3 mm (0.079–0.118 in) long. The sepals are joined at the base, forming a tube 2.0–2.5 mm (0.079–0.098 in) long, the sepal lobes about as long or somewhat shorter than the tube. The petals are purple, the standard petal 10–15 mm (0.39–0.59 in) long and 8–10 mm (0.31–0.39 in) wide, the wings 8–14 mm (0.31–0.55 in) long, and the keel about 10–15 mm (0.39–0.59 in) long and 3–6 mm (0.12–0.24 in) deep. Flowering occurs from April to July, and the fruit is mostly 15–30 mm (0.59–1.18 in) long and 3–4 mm (0.12–0.16 in) wide.

== Taxonomy and naming ==
Swainsona tanamiensis was first formally described in 1993 by Joy Thompson in the journal Telopea from specimens collected by William Robert Barker near Lake Ruth in the Tanami Desert in 1975. The specific epithet (tanamiensis) refers the Tanami Desert.

== Distribution and habitat ==
This species of pea grows in clay or sandy soil on floodplains, and the edges of salt lakes in the Dampierland, Gascoyne, Great Sandy Desert, Pilbara and Tanami bioregions of Western Australia and the Northern Territory.
