= Tetratheca nuda =

Scientific classification
- Kingdom: Plantae
- Clade: Tracheophytes
- Clade: Angiosperms
- Clade: Eudicots
- Clade: Rosids
- Order: Oxalidales
- Family: Elaeocarpaceae
- Genus: Tetratheca
- Species: T. nuda

Binomial name
- Tetratheca nuda Lindl., 1839

Species of flowering plant

Tetratheca nuda is a species of flowering plant in the quandong family that is endemic to Australia.

== Description ==
The species grows as a slender, leafless shrub to 10–40 cm in height. The pink or white flowers appear from August to November.

== Distribution and habitat ==
The range of the species lies within the Jarrah Forest and Swan Coastal Plain IBRA bioregions of south-west Western Australia, on granite outcrops, slopes and plains in the vicinity of the city of Perth, on sandy, lateritic and loam soils.
