= Tetratheca erubescens =

Scientific classification
- Kingdom: Plantae
- Clade: Tracheophytes
- Clade: Angiosperms
- Clade: Eudicots
- Clade: Rosids
- Order: Oxalidales
- Family: Elaeocarpaceae
- Genus: Tetratheca
- Species: T. erubescens

Binomial name
- Tetratheca erubescens J.P.Bull, 2007

Species of flowering plant

Tetratheca erubescens is a species of flowering plant in the quandong family that is endemic to Australia.

== Etymology ==
The specific epithet erubescens (‘blushing’) refers to the appearance of the flowers.

== Description ==
The species grows as a low, tangled shrub to 50 cm in height and 1.5 m wide. The flowers are white, pink or mauve, with darker flecks and speckles.

== Distribution and habitat ==
The range of the species lies within the Coolgardie IBRA bioregion of south-west Western Australia, where it is limited to the Koolyanobbing Range. The plants grow in rock crevices among hill crests, slopes and cliffs, on red-brown sandy and gravelly soils and ironstone.
