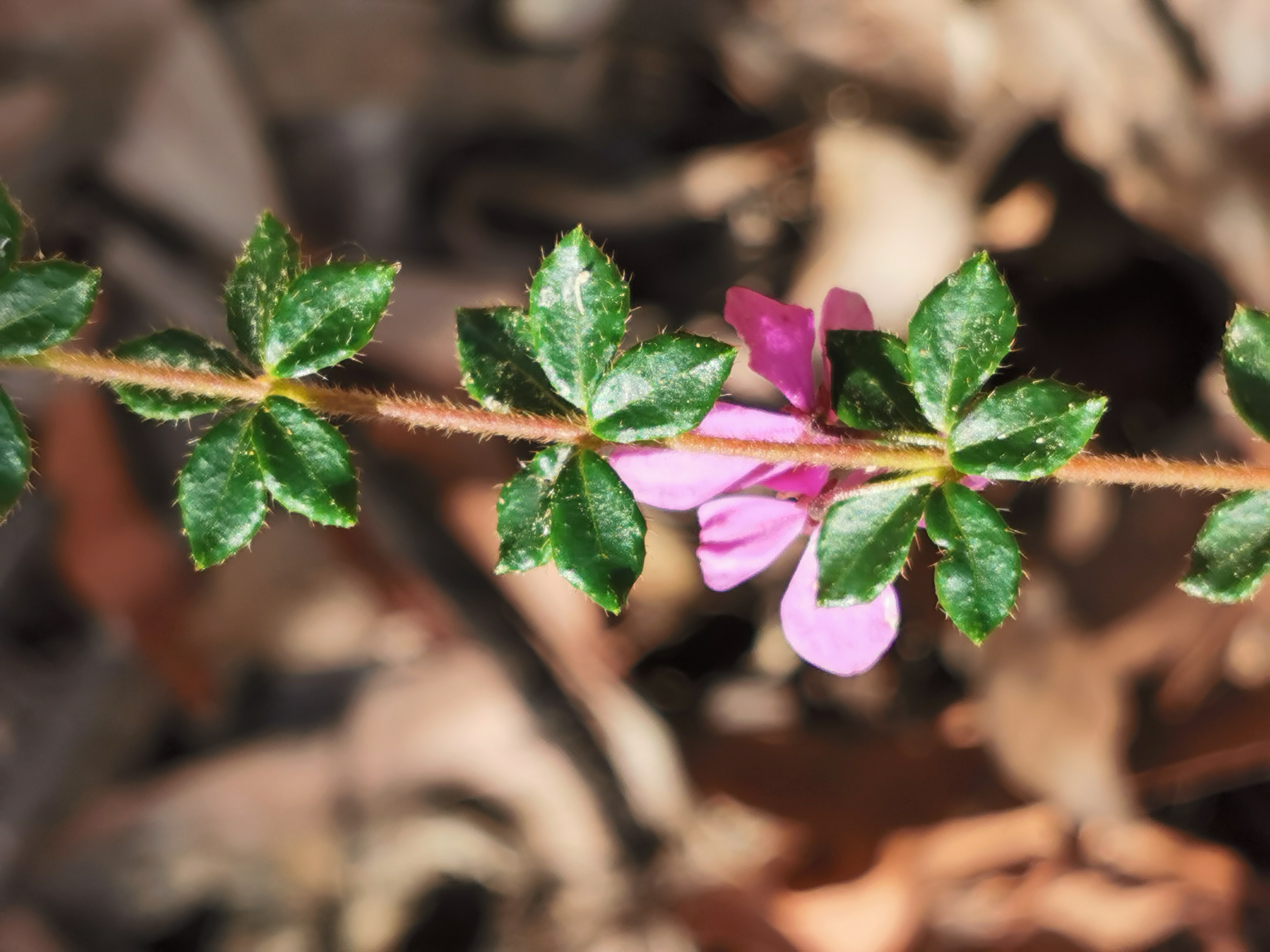
- D'Aguilar National Park: upper surfaces of leaves & flower
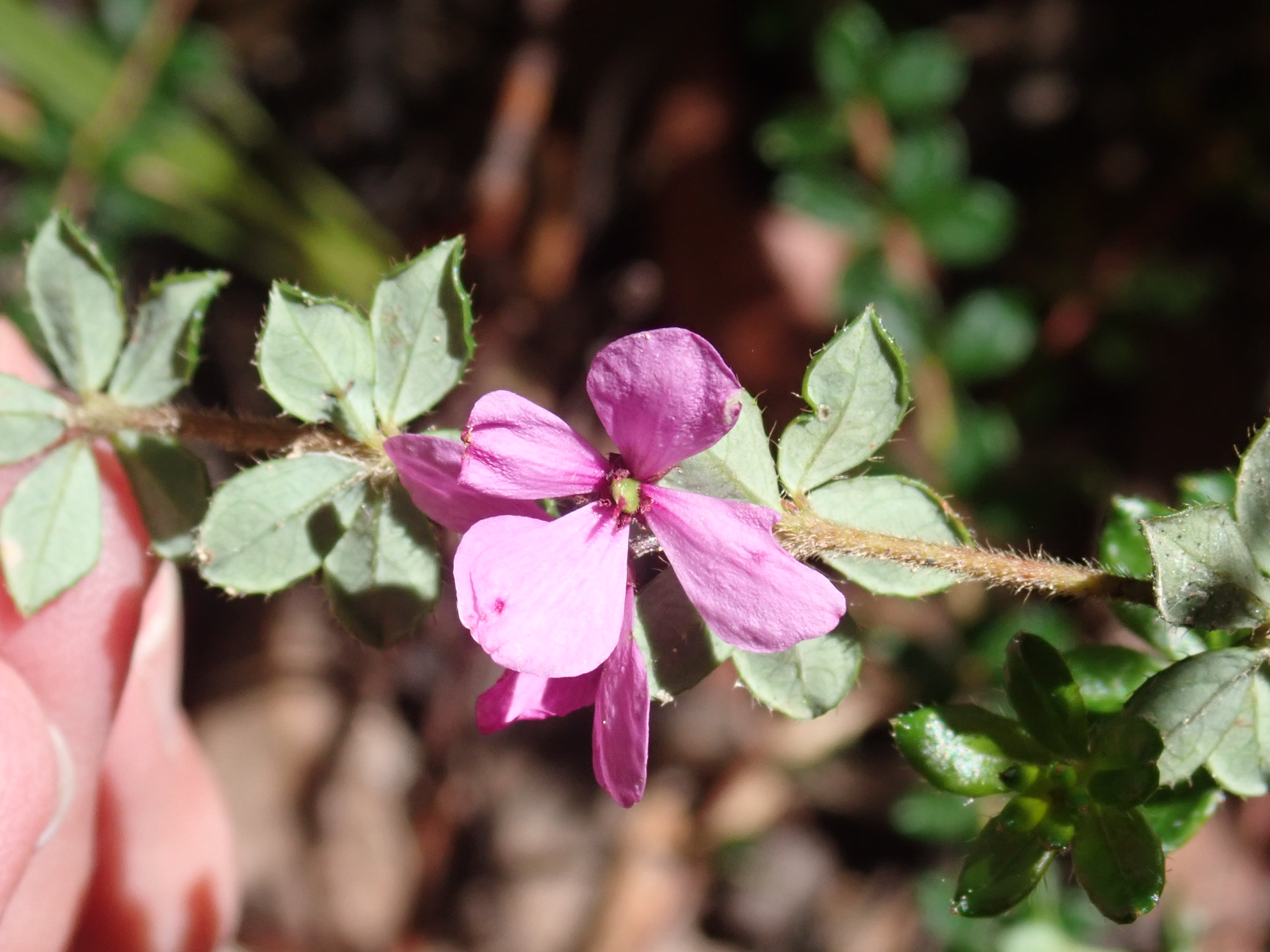
- discolorous lower sides of leaves & inside of flower

Scientific classification
- Kingdom: Plantae
- Clade: Tracheophytes
- Clade: Angiosperms
- Clade: Eudicots
- Clade: Rosids
- Order: Oxalidales
- Family: Elaeocarpaceae
- Genus: Tetratheca
- Species: T. thymifolia

Binomial name
- Tetratheca thymifolia Sm.

= Tetratheca thymifolia =

Species of shrub

Tetratheca thymifolia, commonly known as black-eyed Susan or thyme pink-bells, is a small shrub in the family Elaeocarpaceae found in southeastern Australia.

It was first described by English botanist James Edward Smith in 1804. Its species name is derived from the Latin word folium "leaf" and thymus like the plant of that name. The genus name is derived from the Ancient Greek tetra "four", and theke "sac, box" and relates to the four-celled anthers.

Tetratheca thymifolia grows as a tough-stemmed shrub up to a metre (3 ft) high. Flowering occurs mainly from September to November but individual flowers can be seen at any time of year. The 2.5 cm (1 in) diameter flowers have a strong fragrance on hot days.

The species occurs in southeastern Queensland, through New South Wales and into East Gippsland in eastern Victoria, where it is found in heathland or eucalyptus woodland on sandy soils.

Introduced to horticulture in 1824 in England, Tetratheca thymifolia has been cultivated to some degree since. Several forms have been selected for horticulture, including T. 'Bicentennial Belle', which originates from a naturally occurring population near Bega, New South Wales. This form reaches 0.7 m tall by up to 0.9 m wide, and is freely suckering. It was registered with the Australian Cultivar Registration Authority in 1985 by Austraflora Nursery in Montrose, Victoria. It flowers all year, with peaks in spring and autumn., and has larger flowers than the species. Overall, Tetratheca thymifolia does best in well-drained acidic soils in a sunny or semi-shaded aspect, and tolerates light frosts. It is grown in container gardens or rockeries.
