= Tetratheca gunnii =

Conservation status
- Critically endangered (EPBC Act)

Scientific classification
- Kingdom: Plantae
- Clade: Tracheophytes
- Clade: Angiosperms
- Clade: Eudicots
- Clade: Rosids
- Order: Oxalidales
- Family: Elaeocarpaceae
- Genus: Tetratheca
- Species: T. gunnii

Binomial name
- Tetratheca gunnii Hook.f.

Species of herb

Tetratheca gunnii, commonly known as shy susan, is a perennial herb in the family Elaeocarpaceae. It is endemic to the foothills of the Dazzler Range near Beaconsfield in Tasmania. It grows to between 15 and 50 cm high and has leaves that are up to 5 mm long. The flowers, which are pale lilac to deep pink, appear in spring.

Tetratheca gunnii relies on native bees for pollination.

Associated species include Eucalyptus amygdalina, Eucalyptus ovata, Euryomyrtus ramosissima, Epacris virgata and Hibbertia riparia.
