= Tetratheca pilifera =

Scientific classification
- Kingdom: Plantae
- Clade: Tracheophytes
- Clade: Angiosperms
- Clade: Eudicots
- Clade: Rosids
- Order: Oxalidales
- Family: Elaeocarpaceae
- Genus: Tetratheca
- Species: T. pilifera

Binomial name
- Tetratheca pilifera Lindl., 1840

Species of flowering plant

Tetratheca pilifera is a species of flowering plant in the quandong family that is endemic to Australia.

== Description ==
The species grows as a spreading shrub to 10–30 cm in height. The purple flowers appear from August to October.

== Distribution and habitat ==
The range of the species lies within the Jarrah Forest and Swan Coastal Plain IBRA bioregions of south-west Western Australia, on gravelly soils on the northern and north-eastern outskirts of the city of Perth.
