= T. juncea =

T. juncea may refer to:

- Tetrarrhena juncea, a true grass
- Tetratheca juncea, a shrub endemic to New South Wales
- Tillandsia juncea, a New World plant
- Typha juncea, a wetland plant
