= Tetratheca phoenix =

Scientific classification
- Kingdom: Plantae
- Clade: Tracheophytes
- Clade: Angiosperms
- Clade: Eudicots
- Clade: Rosids
- Order: Oxalidales
- Family: Elaeocarpaceae
- Genus: Tetratheca
- Species: T. phoenix

Binomial name
- Tetratheca phoenix R.Butcher, 2007

Species of flowering plant

Tetratheca phoenix is a species of flowering plant in the quandong family that is endemic to Australia.

== Description ==
The species grows as a small shrub to 25 cm in height, with dark pink-magenta flowers.

== Distribution and habitat ==
The range of the species lies within the Jarrah Forest IBRA bioregion of south-west Western Australia in a small area some 70 km south of the city of Perth on the Darling Scarp. The plants are known only from Mount Cooke, where theygrow near large rock outcrops on brown granitic gravelly loam soils.
