= Tetratheca halmaturina =

Scientific classification
- Kingdom: Plantae
- Clade: Tracheophytes
- Clade: Angiosperms
- Clade: Eudicots
- Clade: Rosids
- Order: Oxalidales
- Family: Elaeocarpaceae
- Genus: Tetratheca
- Species: T. halmaturina

Binomial name
- Tetratheca halmaturina J.M.Black, 1924

Species of flowering plant

Tetratheca halmaturina, also known as curly pink-bells, is a species of plant in the quandong family that is endemic to Australia.

== Description ==
The species grows as a compact shrub, usually to 20 cm (sometimes up to 50 cm) in height. The oval to rhomboidal leaves are 2–4 mm long and are often reduced to triangular scales on the upper branches. The dark pink flowers each have five 8–13 mm long petals, appearing from July to December.

== Distribution and habitat ==
The species is endemic to Kangaroo Island, South Australia, where it is found mainly in the northern and western parts of the island in shrubland.
