= Tetratheca harperi =

Conservation status
- Vulnerable (EPBC Act)

Scientific classification
- Kingdom: Plantae
- Clade: Tracheophytes
- Clade: Angiosperms
- Clade: Eudicots
- Clade: Rosids
- Order: Oxalidales
- Family: Elaeocarpaceae
- Genus: Tetratheca
- Species: T. harperi

Binomial name
- Tetratheca harperi F.Muell., 1865

Species of flowering plant

Tetratheca harperi, also known as Jackson Tetratheca, is a species of flowering plant in the quandong family that is endemic to Australia.

== Description ==
The species grows as a multi-stemmed shrub to 20–40 cm in height. The tiny leaves are 2 mm long, and mature branches are leafless. The flowers each have four or five pink petals 12 mm long and 6 mm wide, and appear from July to November.

== Distribution and habitat ==
The species is only known from Mount Jackson, north of the town of Southern Cross, within the Coolgardie IBRA bioregion of south-west Western Australia. The plants grow on stony loam soils in crevices on rocky outcrops.

== Conservation ==
The species has been listed as Vulnerable under Australia's EPBC Act. Threats include mineral exploration and mining, invasive weeds, inappropriate fire regimes and grazing by feral goats.
