= Swainsona rotunda =

Scientific classification
- Kingdom: Plantae
- Clade: Tracheophytes
- Clade: Angiosperms
- Clade: Eudicots
- Clade: Rosids
- Order: Fabales
- Family: Fabaceae
- Subfamily: Faboideae
- Genus: Swainsona
- Species: S. rotunda

Binomial name
- Swainsona rotunda Joy Thomps.

Species of plant

Swainsona rotunda is a species of flowering plant in the family Fabaceae and is endemic to inland areas of northern Western Australia. It is a prostrate herb with imparipinnate leaves with about 7 narrowly lance-shaped leaflets, and racemes of up to 4 lilac-coloured flowers.

== Description ==
Swainsona rotunda is prostrate herb with imparipinnate leaves up to 25 mm (0.98 in) long with about 7 narrowly lance-shaped leaflets, the side leaflets mostly 5–10 mm (0.20–0.39 in) long and mostly about 1.5 mm (0.059 in) wide. There is a stipule 1–2 mm (0.039–0.079 in) long at the base of the petiole. The flowers are arranged in racemes 15–25 mm (0.59–0.98 in) long with about 7 flowers on a peduncle less than 0.5 mm (0.020 in) wide, each flower about 4 mm (0.16 in) long on a pedicel about 0.5 mm (0.020 in) long. The sepals are joined at the base, forming a tube about 1 mm (0.039 in) long, the sepal lobes about as long as the tube. The petals are lilac-coloured, the standard petal about 4 mm (0.16 in) long and wide, the wings about 4 mm (0.16 in) long, and the keel about 4 mm (0.16 in) long and 1.5 mm (0.059 in) deep. Flowering has been observed in August, and the fruit is more or less round, about 7 mm (0.28 in) long and wide.

== Taxonomy and naming ==
Swainsona rotunda was first formally described in 1993 by Joy Thompson in the journal Telopea from specimens in 1975. The specific epithet (rotunda) means "round", referring to the shape of the fruit.

== Distribution and habitat ==
This species of pea grows in red, sandy loam in the Gascoyne and Murchison bioregions of northern inland Western Australia.
