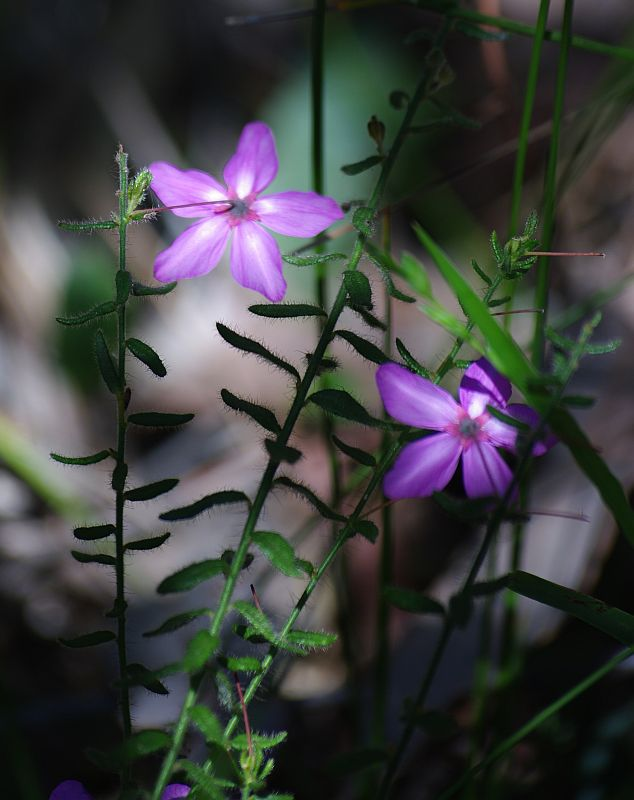

Scientific classification
- Kingdom: Plantae
- Clade: Tracheophytes
- Clade: Angiosperms
- Clade: Eudicots
- Clade: Rosids
- Order: Oxalidales
- Family: Elaeocarpaceae
- Genus: Tetratheca
- Species: T. hirsuta

Binomial name
- Tetratheca hirsuta Lindl.

Synonyms
- Tetratheca aculeata Steetz; Tetratheca epilobioides Steetz; Tetratheca viminea Lindl.

= Tetratheca hirsuta =

Species of shrub

Tetratheca hirsuta, commonly known as black-eyed Susan, is a small shrub in the family Elaeocarpaceae. Endemic to the south-west of Western Australia, it is not related to other plants known as black-eyed Susan around the world.

== Description ==
Tetratheca hirsuta has an erect, climbing habit, growing to between 0.1 and 0.9 (4–36 in) metres high. It has a woody rootstock from which arise multiple rough stems which are hairy at their upper ends. The green hairy leaves are arranged alternately, oppositely or in whorls and measure 0.5–2.5 cm (0.2–1 in) by 0.5–1 cm (0.2–0.4 in). Pink flowers appear between July and December in the species' native range. They appear on stalks around 3 cm (1.2 in) in length and are 2 cm (0.8 in) in diameter. They have five deep pink or purple-tinted petals.

== Taxonomy ==
The species was first formally described by English botanist John Lindley in 1839 in A sketch of the vegetation of the Swan River colony The specific name hirsuta is Latin "hairy". The genus name is derived from the Ancient Greek tetra "four", and theke "sac, box" and relates to the four-celled anthers.

== Distribution and habitat ==
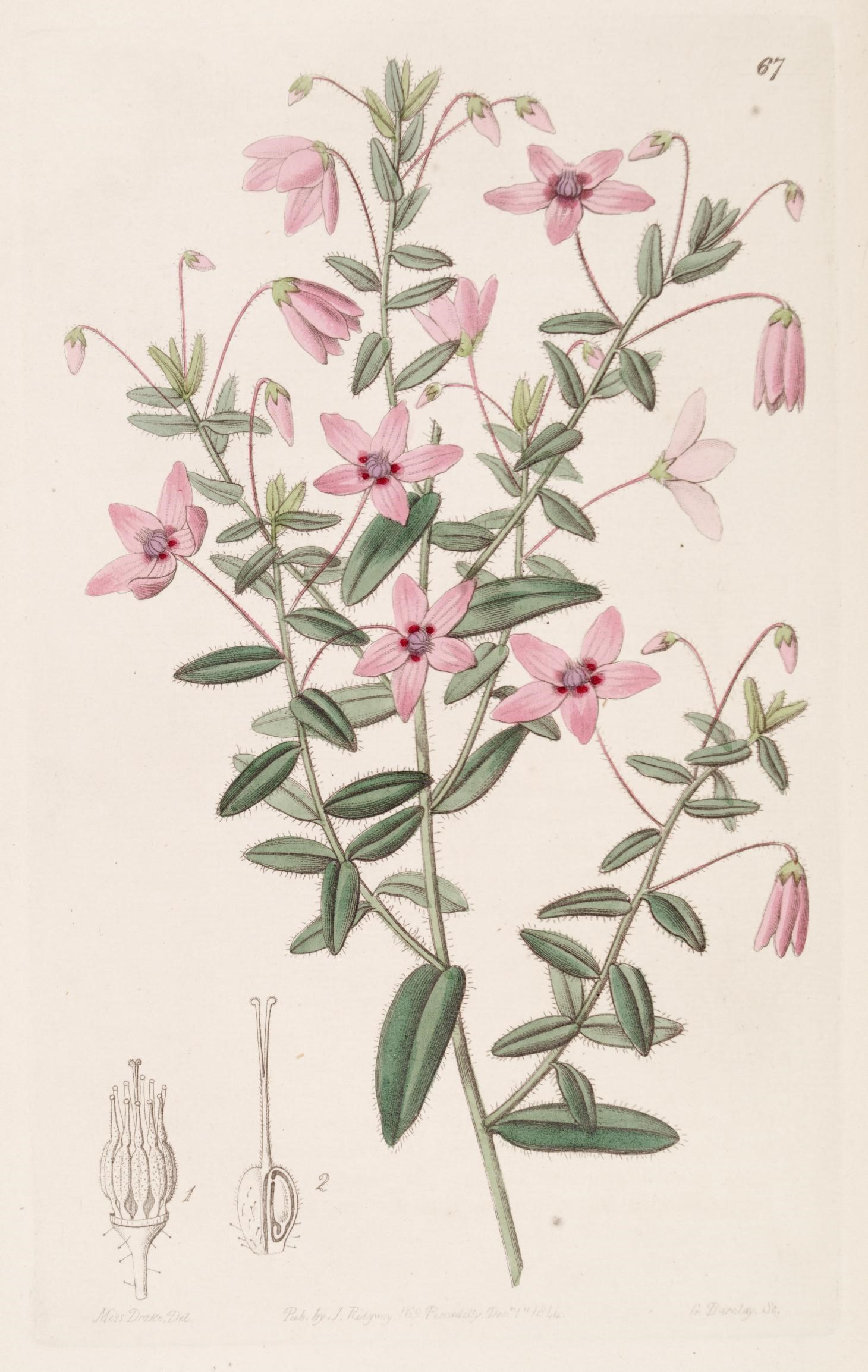
Illustration from 1844

Tetratheca hirsuta is found on lateritic gravelly soils in open woodland and heath in southwestern Western Australia, in the Darling, Avon and western Eyre districts.

== Cultivation ==
First cultivated in England in 1843 (as T. rubriseta), Tetratheca hirsuta is rarely cultivated but has horticultural potential, for rockeries. It prefers acidic soils and sunny or part-shaded aspect. Pruning stems to just above ground level can rejuvenate the plant.
