= Dubouzetia =

Scientific classification
- Kingdom: Plantae
- Clade: Embryophytes
- Clade: Tracheophytes
- Clade: Spermatophytes
- Clade: Angiosperms
- Clade: Eudicots
- Clade: Rosids
- Order: Oxalidales
- Family: Elaeocarpaceae
- Genus: Dubouzetia; Pancher ex Brongn. & Gris

Type species
- Dubouzetia campanulata Pancher ex Brongn. & Gris

Species
- See text

Genus of flowering plants

Dubouzetia is a genus of about eleven species known to science, growing from shrubs up to large trees, in Papuasia and Australasia and constituting part of the plant family Elaeocarpaceae.

They grow naturally in New Caledonia, New Guinea, the Moluccas, and in Australia in the Northern Territory and north-eastern Queensland.

Some species grow from understorey trees up to large trees in the natural habitats of rainforests, some species grow up to smaller shrubs in drier forests and in Australia two rare species occur, only known from sandstone rocky outcrops.

In Australia, the very restricted north-eastern Queensland endemic species D. saxatilis has official recognition of its risk of extinction in the wild by the Queensland state government's official "vulnerable" species conservation status.

== Naming and classification ==
In 1861 European science formally named and described this genus and its New Caledonia type species D. campanulata, authored by the French botanists Adolphe-Théodore Brongniart & Jean Antoine Arthur Gris.

Many species' formal names and descriptions were published since that time, together with a few revisions of the genus or parts of it.

== Species ==
- Dubouzetia acuminata Sprague – New Caledonia endemic
- Dubouzetia australiensis Coode – Northern Territory endemic, Australia
- Dubouzetia campanulata Pancher ex Brongn. & Gris – New Caledonia endemic
- Dubouzetia caudiculata Sprague syn.: D. leionema Sprague – New Caledonia endemic
- Dubouzetia confusa Guillaumin & Virot – New Caledonia endemic
- Dubouzetia dentata A.C.Sm. – Seram Island, Moluccas endemic
- Dubouzetia elegans Brongn. & Gris – New Guinea, New Caledonia
  - var. elegans, syn.: D. parviflora Brogn. & Gris – New Caledonia endemic
  - var. novoguineensis (A.C.Sm.) Tirel, syn.: D. novoguineensis A.C.Sm. – New Guinea
- Dubouzetia galorei Coode – New Guinea endemic
- Dubouzetia guillauminii Virot – New Caledonia endemic
- Dubouzetia kairoi Coode – New Guinea endemic
- Dubouzetia saxatilis A.R.Bean & Jessup - north-eastern Qld endemic, Australia
