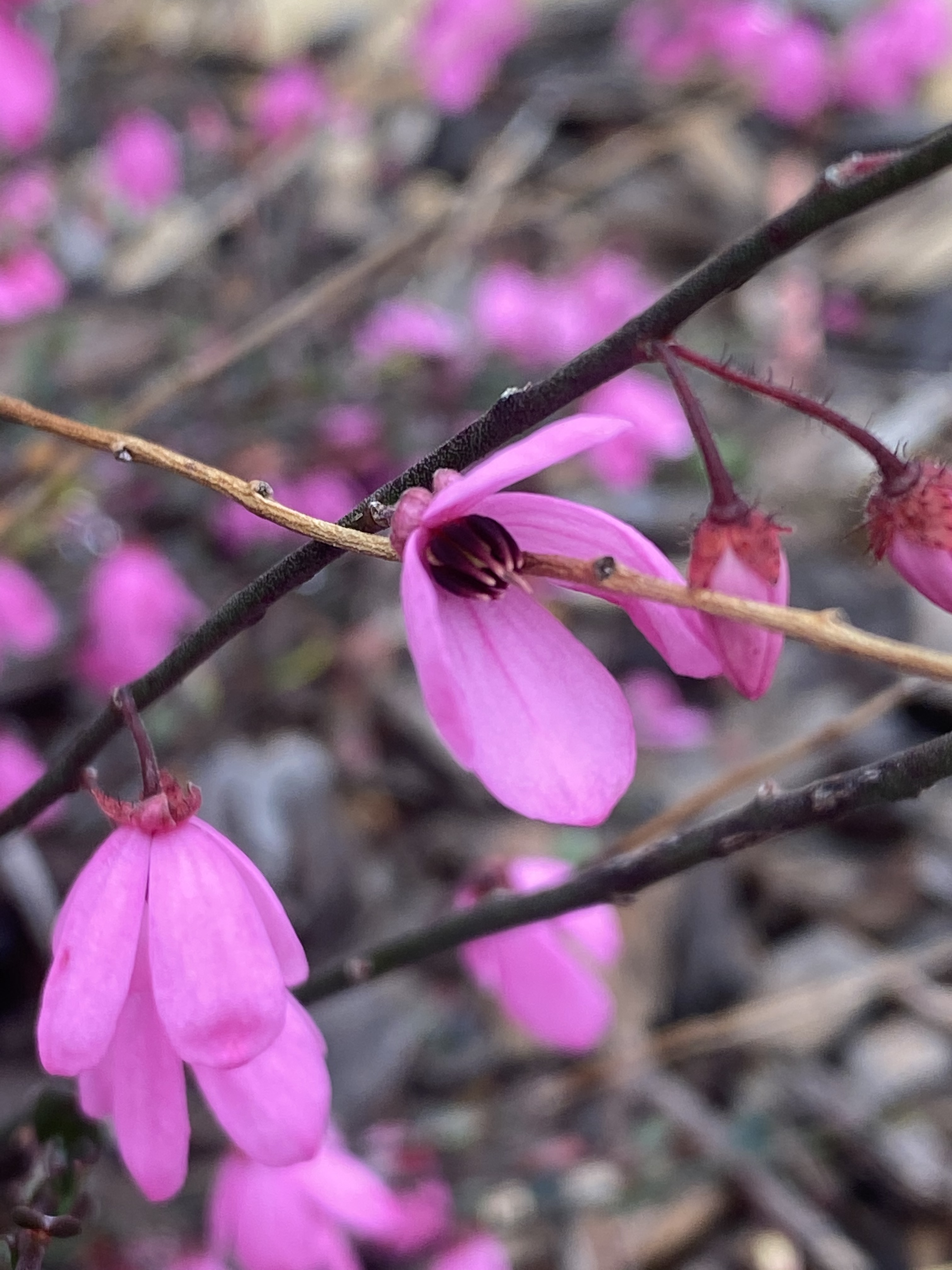

Scientific classification
- Kingdom: Plantae
- Clade: Tracheophytes
- Clade: Angiosperms
- Clade: Eudicots
- Clade: Rosids
- Order: Oxalidales
- Family: Elaeocarpaceae
- Genus: Tetratheca
- Species: T. ciliata

Binomial name
- Tetratheca ciliata Lindl.

= Tetratheca ciliata =

Pink bells

Species of plant

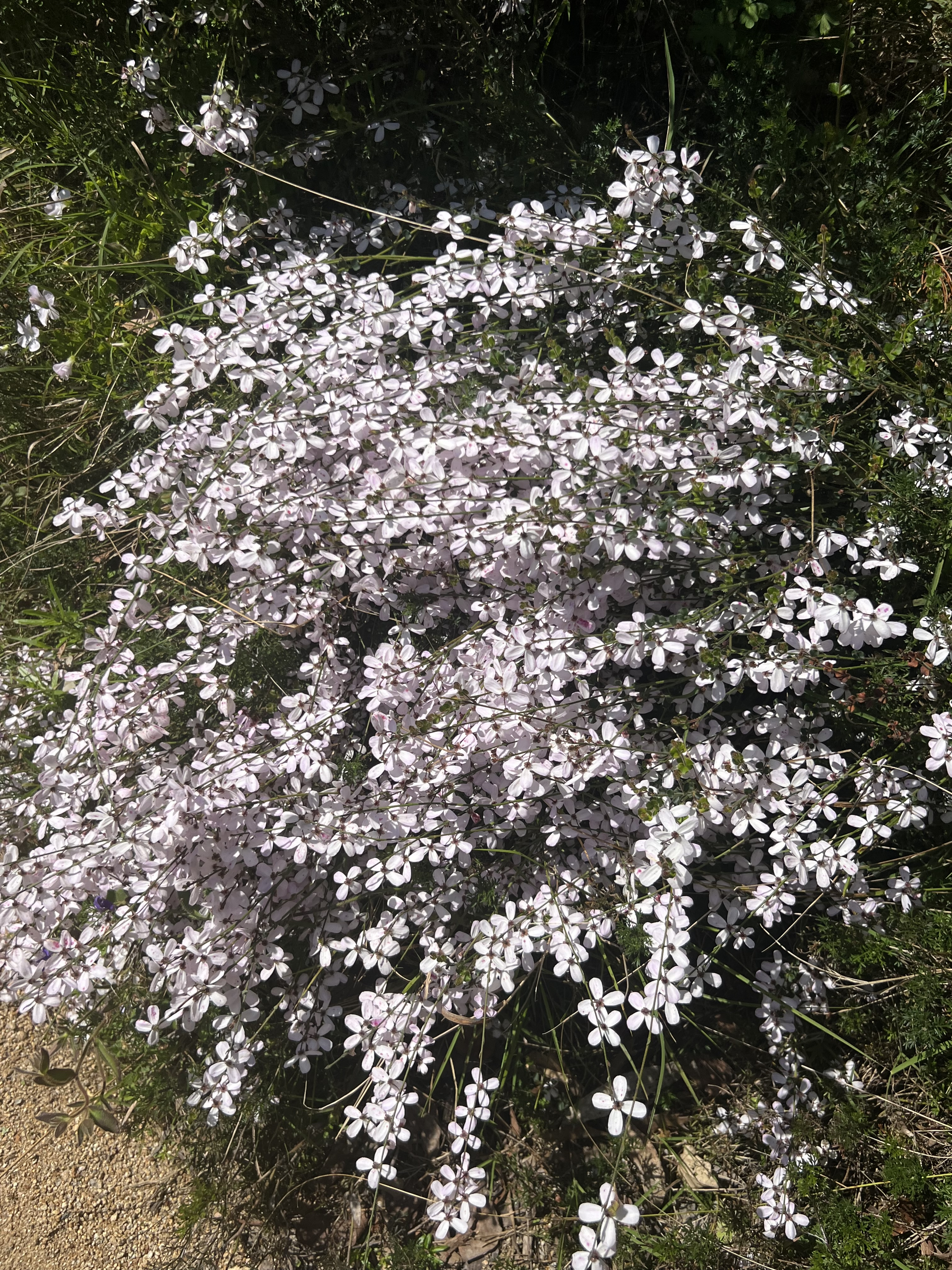
White form

Tetratheca ciliata, commonly known as pink bells, is a small shrub in the family Elaeocarpaceae. It is endemic to southern Australia.

It is a small shrub which may grow up to 100 cm high. Deep lilac pink flowers appear between October and November in the species' native range.

The species was first formally described by English botanist John Lindley in 1838 in Three Expeditions into the interior of Eastern Australia.

It occurs in Western Australia, South Australia, Tasmania, Victoria and New South Wales.
