= Sericolea =

Scientific classification
- Kingdom: Plantae
- Clade: Tracheophytes
- Clade: Angiosperms
- Clade: Eudicots
- Clade: Rosids
- Order: Oxalidales
- Family: Elaeocarpaceae
- Genus: Sericolea; Schltr.

Genus of plants

Sericolea is a genus of flowering plants belonging to the family Elaeocarpaceae.

Its native range is New Guinea.

Species:

- Sericolea arfakensis Gibbs
- Sericolea brassii A.C.Sm.
- Sericolea calophylla (Ridl.) Schltr.
- Sericolea chrysotricha Schltr.
- Sericolea collinsii Coode
- Sericolea coodei Balgooy
- Sericolea decandra A.C.Sm.
- Sericolea gaultheria (F.Muell.) Schltr.
- Sericolea gracilis (Lauterb.) Schltr.
- Sericolea leptophylla Kaneh. & Hatus.
- Sericolea micans Schltr.
- Sericolea novoguineensis Gibbs
- Sericolea ovalifolia (Wernham ex Ridl.) Gibbs
- Sericolea pachyphylla Coode
- Sericolea papuana (F.Muell.) Steenis
- Sericolea pullei (Lauterb.) Schltr.
- Sericolea ridleyana (Wernham ex Ridl.) Schltr.
- Sericolea salicina Schltr.
