= Black-eyed Susan =

Black-eyed Susan may refer to:

== Flowers ==
- Rudbeckia hirta, a member of the sunflower tribe of the large family Asteraceae
- A number of other members of the genus Rudbeckia
- Hibiscus trionum in the family Malvaceae
- The black-eyed susan vine, Thunbergia alata, in the family Acanthaceae
- Some members of the Australian plant genus Tetratheca, particularly Tetratheca hirsuta, a member of the family Elaeocarpaceae

== Theatre and film ==
- Black-Eyed Susan; or, All in the Downs, an 1829 play by Douglas William Jerrold
- Black-Eyed Susan (film), a 1913 film adaptation directed by Percy Nash
- Black-Eyed Susan (actress) (alsi known as Susan Carlson), avant-garde stage actor

== Music ==
- "Black-eyed Susan" or "All in the Downs", is a sea song by John Gay (1685–1732), more fully titled "Sweet William's Farewell to Black-Eyed Susan"
- "Blackeyed Susan", a song by The Triffids from The Black Swan
- The Blackeyed Susans, an Australian band, named after the Triffids song
- Blackeyed Susan (band), a Philadelphia-area band formed by "Dizzy" Dean Davidson after he left Britny Fox in 1989
- "Black-eyed Susan", a Morrissey song released as a B-Side to "Sunny" and later on My Early Burglary Years
- "Black Eyed Susan", a Paul Westerberg song from his album 14 Songs
- "Black-Eyed Susan" (song), a 1994 song by Prairie Oyster
- "Black Eyed Susan", a song from the album Mockingbird Time by The Jayhawks
- "Black Eyed Susans", a song by Brett Kissel from The Compass Project - West Album

== Others ==
- another name for Sussex pond pudding
- Black-Eyed Susan Stakes

== See also ==
- Susan
