= Mount Manning Range Nature Reserve =

Protected area in Western Australia

- IUCN category Ia (strict nature reserve)
- Location within Western Australia
- Location: Western Australia
- Nearest city: Southern Cross
- Coordinates: 30°04′S 119°44′E
- Area: 36,607 ha (141.34 sq mi)
- Established: 2010
- Governing body: Department of Biodiversity, Conservation and Attractions

Mount Manning Range Nature Reserve is a nature reserve in the Goldfields region of Western Australia north of Southern Cross in the area known as the Northern Yilgarn, in the Coolgardie bioregion. It originally covered an area of 170,000 hectares (420,000 acres), but, as of 2022, its size stands at 36,607 hectares (90,460 acres).

The Mount Manning Range is located inside the reserve.

On 14 May 2007 EPA Bulletin 1256 proposed an A Class Nature Reserve to be established.

It was announced in September 2010.

The reserve is one of a number of reserves being incorporated into the Northern Yilgarn Conservation Reserves Management Plan. The other reserves are Mount Elvire Conservation Park, Die Hardy Range Nature Reserve, Diemals/Mount Jackson/Windaring, and Juardi Conservation Park.

Additionally, a Mount Manning Range Conservation Park also exists, which was established in 2005 with a size of 146,935 hectares (363,080 acres).
