= Northern Yilgarn =

Northern Yilgarn is an area at the juncture of the Shire of Yilgarn, Shire of Menzies and Shire of Coolgardie in Western Australia, north of Koolyanobbing.

It is an area with rich mineral deposits, including uranium.

It lies at the area located east of the eastern Wheatbelt region, and is a significant area for conservation reserves.

Existing or proposed reserves include:

- Jaurdi Conservation Park
- Helena and Aurora Range Nature reserve
- Mount Manning Nature Reserve
- Die Hardy/Jackson/Windarling Range Nature Reserve
- Mount Elvire Conservation Park
