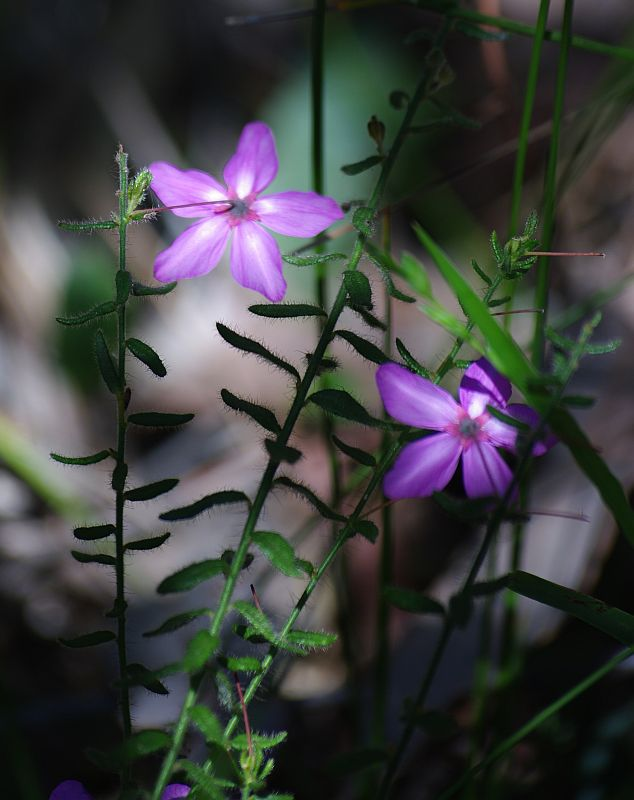
- Tetratheca hirsuta

Scientific classification
- Kingdom: Plantae
- Clade: Tracheophytes
- Clade: Angiosperms
- Clade: Eudicots
- Clade: Rosids
- Order: Oxalidales
- Family: Elaeocarpaceae
- Genus: Tetratheca; Sm.

Species
- See text

= Tetratheca =

Family of shrubs

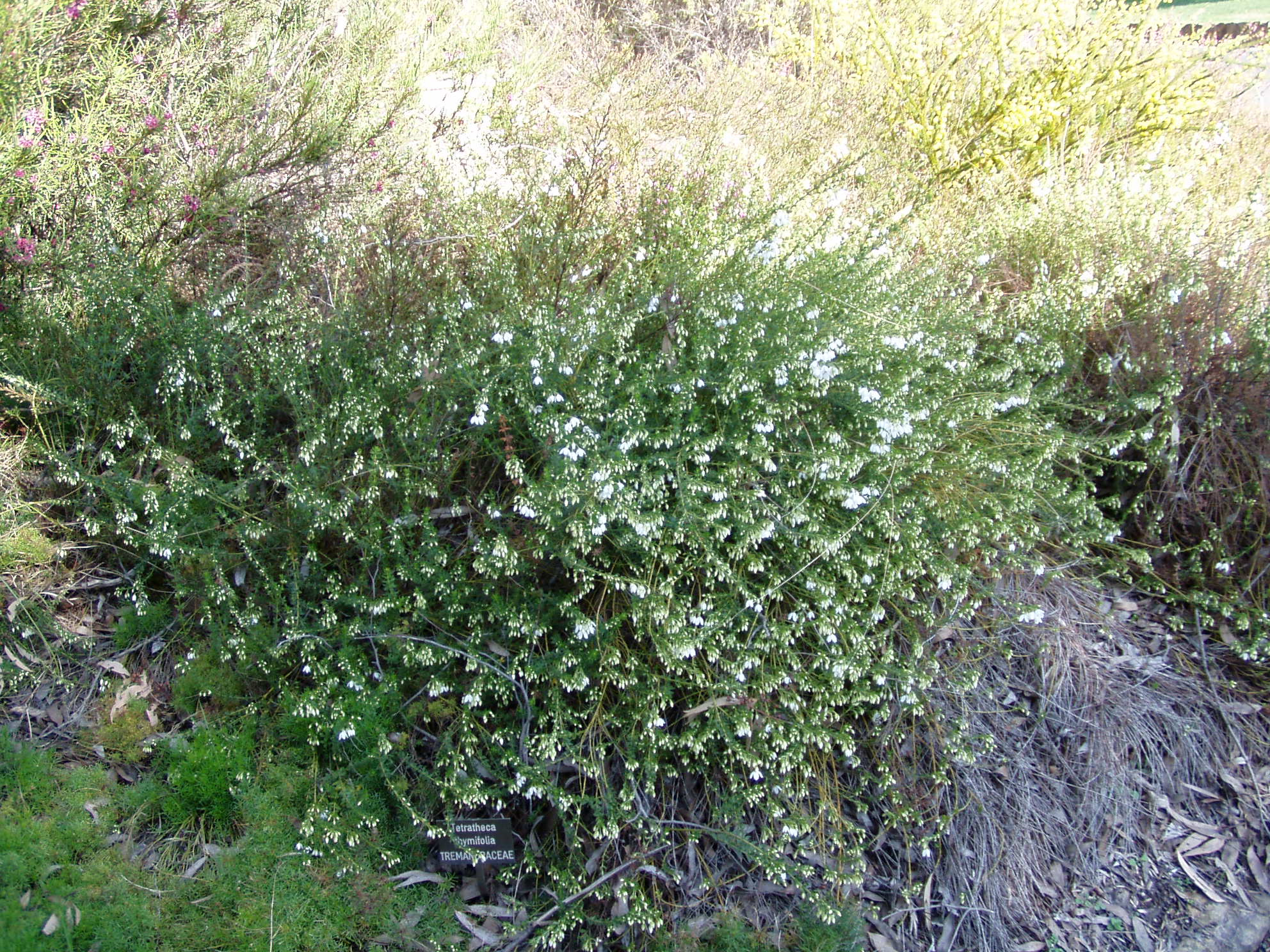
Tetratheca thymifolia

Tetratheca is a genus of around 50 to 60 species of shrubs endemic to Australia. It is classified in the botanical family Elaeocarpaceae, now known to encompass the family Tremandraceae, which the genus originally belonged to. It occurs throughout extratropical Australia, and has been recorded in every mainland state except the Northern Territory.

== Origin and evolution ==
The origin of the genus is thought to be south-western Western Australia, radiating eastward. The distribution of Tetratheca is mainly across the temperate southern part of the continent. Most species are localised endemics and are highly disjunct from each other. Very few are widespread across Australia; none occurs in the Nullarbor Plain and only seven are found on both the western and the south-eastern sides. (McPherson, 2008). The formation of the Nullarbor is thought to have created a barrier to dispersal between the east and west.

It is estimated that the family Elaeocarpaceae is 120 million years old and Tetratheca estimated to be around 37 to 39 million years old, with major diversification over the Miocene and evolving much faster than their relatives, many of which are rainforest species. This coincides with the rapid radiation and diversification of other sclerophyllous groups.

== Species ==
Species include:

- Tetratheca affinis Endl.
- Tetratheca aphylla F.Muell. - Bungalbin tetratheca
- Tetratheca bauerifolia F.Muell. ex Schuch. - heath pink-bells
- Tetratheca ciliata Lindl. - pink-bells
- Tetratheca confertifolia Steetz
- Tetratheca decora Joy Thomps.
- Tetratheca deltoidea Joy Thomps.
- Tetratheca efoliata F.Muell.
- Tetratheca elliptica Joy Thomps.
- Tetratheca ericifolia Sm.
- Tetratheca erubescens J.P.Bull
- Tetratheca exasperata R.Butcher
- Tetratheca fasciculata Joy Thomps. - Cronin's tetratheca
- Tetratheca filiformis Benth.
- Tetratheca glandulosa Sm.
- Tetratheca gunnii Hook.f. - shy susan
- Tetratheca halmaturina J.M.Black - curly pink-bells
- Tetratheca harperi F.Muell. - Jackson tetratheca
- Tetratheca hirsuta Lindl. - black-eyed susan
- Tetratheca hispidissima Steetz
- Tetratheca insularis Joy Thomps.
- Tetratheca juncea Sm.
- Tetratheca labillardierei Joy Thomps.
- Tetratheca neglecta Joy Thomps.
- Tetratheca nephelioides R.Butcher
- Tetratheca nuda Lindl.
- Tetratheca parvifolia Joy Thomps.
- Tetratheca paucifolia Joy Thomps.
- Tetratheca paynterae Alford
- Tetratheca phoenix R.Butcher
- Tetratheca pilata R.Butcher
- Tetratheca pilifera Lindl.
- Tetratheca pilosa Labill. - hairy pink-bells
- Tetratheca procumbens Hook.f. - mountain pink-bells
- Tetratheca pubescens Turcz.
- Tetratheca remota Joy Thomps.
- Tetratheca retrorsa Joy Thomps.
- Tetratheca rubioides A.Cunn.
- Tetratheca rupicola Joy Thomps.
- Tetratheca setigera Endl.
- Tetratheca shiressii Blakely
- Tetratheca similis Joy Thomps.
- Tetratheca stenocarpa J.H.Willis - long pink-bells
- Tetratheca subaphylla Benth. - leafless pink-bells
- Tetratheca thymifolia Sm. - black-eyed susan, thyme pink-bells
- Tetratheca virgata Steetz
