= Joy Thompson =

Australian botanist (1923–2018)

- Born: Joy Gardiner-Garden; 3 October 1923; Manly, Sydney
- Died: 15 August 2018 (aged 94); Moss Vale
- Education: Sydney University
- Spouse: Max Thompson
- Scientific career
- Fields: Botany
- Author abbrev. (botany): Joy Thomps. (INPI), J.Garden (INPI)

Joy Thompson (born Joy Gardiner-Garden, 1923, died 2018) was an Australian botanist. Her main research areas were taxonomy and Myrtaceae.

== Life and career ==
Thompson's university studies occurred during the second world war and in university vacations she worked in the Land Army near Maitland. She graduated in 1946 with a B.Sc. (Agric) from the University of Sydney, and went to work at the New South Wales Herbarium (then a part of the NSW department of Agriculture). She was Honorary Secretary of the Systematic Botany Committee of ANZAAS from 1952 to 1954.

In 1956 she married Max Thompson and, as a public servant, resigned from her position as was required at the time. Ten years later, after the birth of her two children, she returned to work at the Herbarium, in a part-time position. On her retirement in 1982, she became an Honorary Research Associate, and until 2009, continued to work in this role, making the 2.5 hour train journey from Mittagong once a week.

The standard author abbreviation Joy Thomps. is used to indicate this person as the author when citing a botanical name. The INPI also gives the abbreviation J. Garden.

== Some publications ==
- 1993. A revision of the genus Swainsona (Fabaceae). Telopea 5(3): 427-581
- 1992. (with J. Everett) New alpine and subalpine species in Craspedia sens. strict. (Asteraceae: Gnaphalieae). Telopea 5(1): 45-51
- 1991. Swainsona pyrophila (Fabaceae), a new name and synonymisation. Telopea 4(2): 359-359
- 1990. New species and new combinations in the genus Swainsona (Fabaceae) in New South Wales. Telopea 4(1): 1-5
- 1989. (with J.R. Clarkson) A revision of the genus Neofabricia (Myrtaceae). Telopea 3(3): 291-300
- 1989. A revision of the genus Leptospermum (Myrtaceae). Telopea 3(3): 301-449
- 1986. (with L.A.S. Johnson) Callitris glaucophylla Australia's 'White Cypress Pine' - a new name for an old species. Telopea 2(6): 731-736
- 1983. Redefinitions and nomenclatural changes within the Leptospermum suballiance of Myrtaceae. Telopea 2(4): 379–383
- 1981. A key to the plants of the subalpine and alpine zones of the Kosciusko region. Telopea 2(3): 219–297
- 1981. (with Max Gray)A check-list of the subalpine and alpine species found in the Kosciusko region of New South Wales. Telopea 2(3): 299–346
- 1976. A Revision of the Genus Tetratheca (Tremandraceae). Telopea 1(3): 139–215

=== Books ===
- 1993. A Revision of the Genus Swainsona (Fabaceae). Telopea (Sydney) 5 (3): 156 pp.
- 1986. A Revision of the Genus Leptospermum: Including a Discussion of the Variation Contained Within the Genus and Its Probable Significance as Indicating the Origin, Subsequent Evolution and Spread of the Group. Editor Univ. of Sydney, 678 pp.
- 1978. Polygalaceae. Flora of New South Wales 112: 118 pp.
- 1961. Papilionaceae. Flora of New South Wales 101: 91 pp.

== Honours ==
=== Eponymy ===
- (Myrtaceae) Gaudium (genus name latin for "joy") M. M. Heslewood & P. G. Wilson
- (Oxalidaceae) Oxalis thompsoniae B.J.Conn & P.G.Richards
- (Poaceae) Agrostis thompsoniae S.W.L.Jacobs
