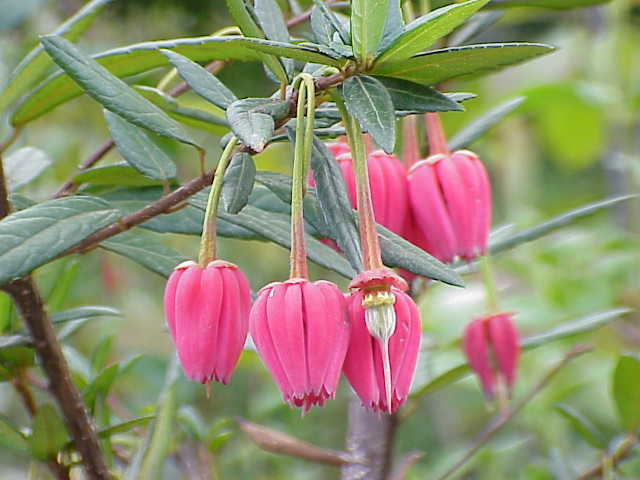
- Crinodendron hookerianum

Scientific classification
- Kingdom: Plantae
- Clade: Embryophytes
- Clade: Tracheophytes
- Clade: Angiosperms
- Clade: Eudicots
- Clade: Rosids
- Order: Oxalidales
- Family: Elaeocarpaceae; Juss. ex DC.

Genera
- See text

= Elaeocarpaceae =

Elaeocarpaceae Temporal range: Santonian–Recent

Family of flowering plants

Elaeocarpaceae is a family of flowering plants. The family contains approximately 615 species of trees and shrubs in 12 genera. The largest genera are Elaeocarpus, with about 350 species, and Sloanea, with about 120.

The species of Elaeocarpaceae are mostly tropical and subtropical, with a few temperate-zone species. Most species are evergreen. They are found in Madagascar, Southeast Asia, Australia, New Zealand, West Indies, and South America.

Plants in this family have simple leaves, usually arranged alternately, sometimes in opposite pairs or whorled, often clustered at the ends of the branches, usually with a toothed edge but sometimes reduced to scales. The flowers are arranged in leaf axils, singly or in groups and are radially symmetrical. The flowers usually have both male and female organs, four or five sepals and four or five petals. In some genera, there are twice as many stamens as petals and in others, there may be many stamens. In most species, the anther is much longer than the filament of the stamen. The fruit is a capsule, a drupe or a berry.

A phylogeny of the family, based on DNA sequences was published in 2006.

== Genera ==
Twelve genera of Elaeocarpaceae are accepted by Plants of the World Online as at August 2021:

- Aceratium DC.
- Aristotelia L'Hér.
- Crinodendron Molina
- Dubouzetia Pancher ex Brongn. & Gris
- Elaeocarpus Burm. ex L.
- Peripentadenia L.S.Sm.
- Platytheca Steetz
- Sericolea Schltr.
- Sloanea L.
- Tetratheca Sm.
- Tremandra R.Br. ex DC.
- Vallea Mutis ex L.f.
