= Tremandraceae =

Plant family

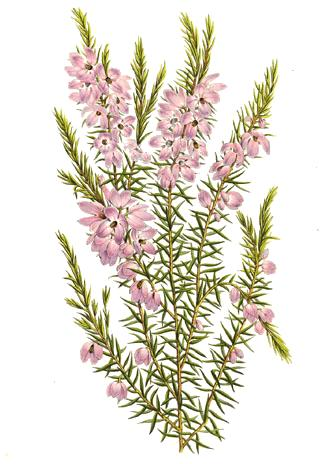
Tetratheca pilosa

Tremandraceae R.Br. ex DC. is the name of a defunct family of flowering plants. It contained three genera: Platytheca, Tetratheca, and Tremandra. In 2006, a molecular phylogenetic study showed that Tremandraceae is embedded in Elaeocarpaceae. Recognizing Tremandraceae as a separate family would make Elaeocarpaceae paraphyletic.

Tremandraceae was first recognized by Robert Brown in 1814, as Tremandreae, before the suffix - aceae was used to denote plant families. Brown's name was not validly published, but the name was validated by Augustin Pyramus de Candolle in 1824. The name Tremandreae is still sometimes used for this group, but at the taxonomic rank of tribe.
