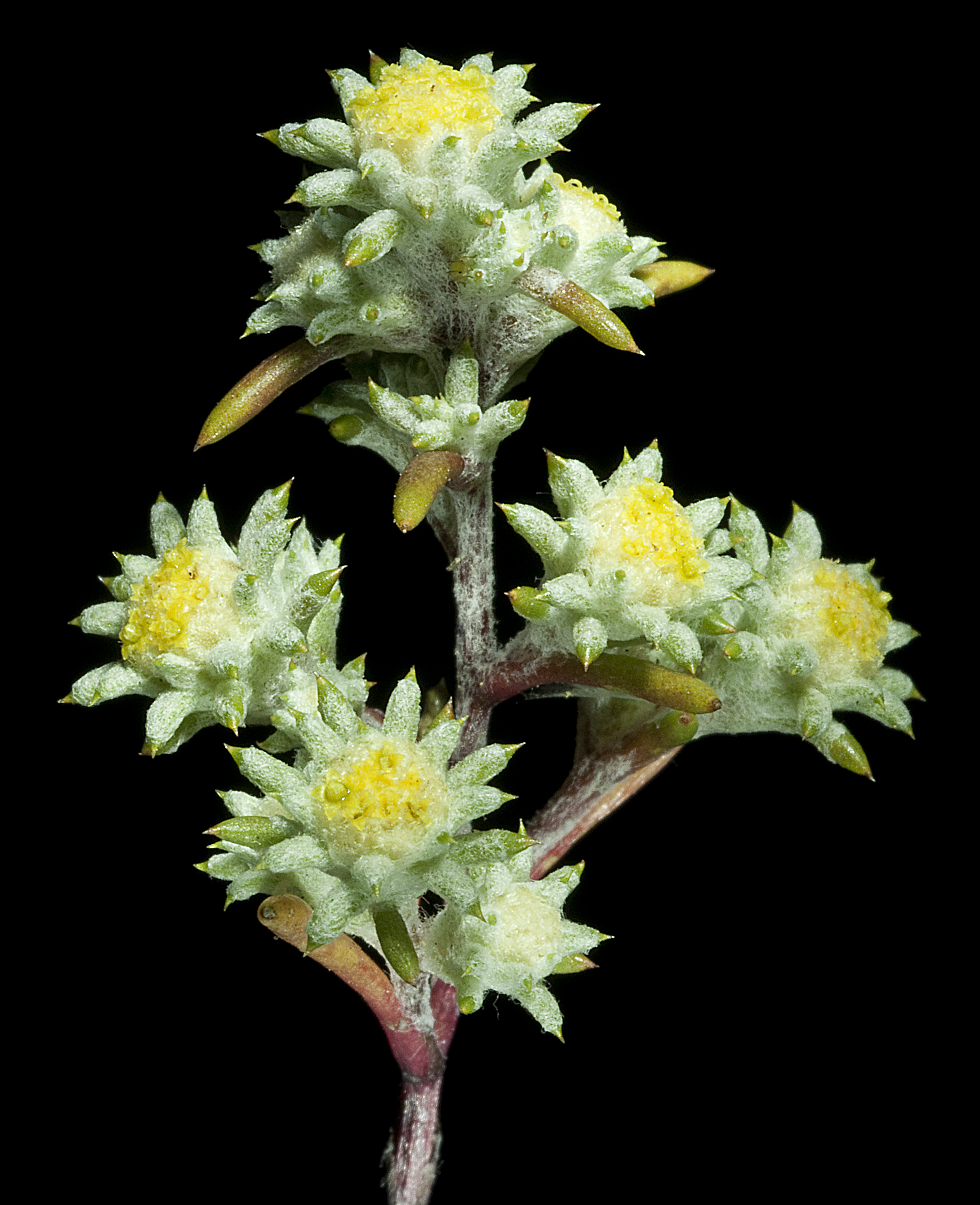

Scientific classification
- Kingdom: Plantae
- Clade: Tracheophytes
- Clade: Angiosperms
- Clade: Eudicots
- Clade: Asterids
- Order: Asterales
- Family: Asteraceae
- Genus: Pogonolepis
- Species: P. stricta

Binomial name
- Pogonolepis stricta Steetz

= Pogonolepis stricta =

Species of flowering plant

Pogonolepis stricta is a species of flowering plant in the family Asteraceae. The species is endemic to Western Australia. It was first described by Joachim Steetz in 1845.

It is an annual herb, with yellow flowers (from August to November), growing to heights of 1 cm to 20 cm high on a variety of soils.
