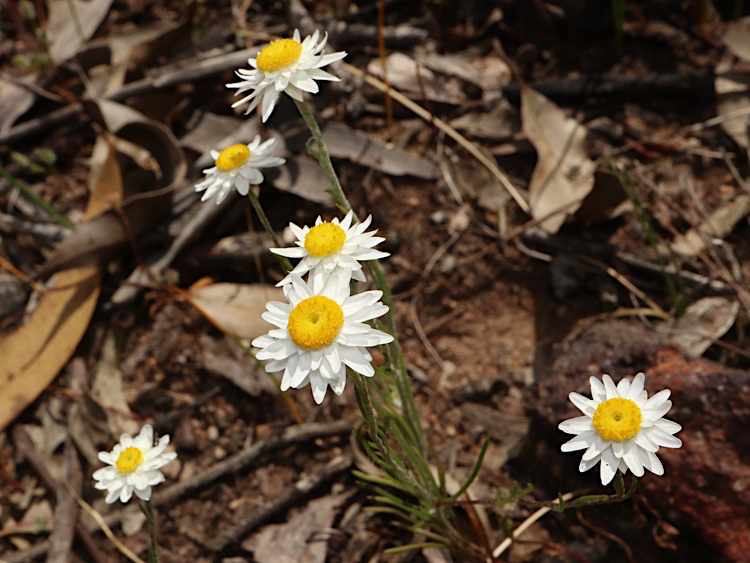

Scientific classification
- Kingdom: Plantae
- Clade: Tracheophytes
- Clade: Angiosperms
- Clade: Eudicots
- Clade: Asterids
- Order: Asterales
- Family: Asteraceae
- Genus: Hyalosperma
- Species: H. simplex

Binomial name
- Hyalosperma simplex (Steetz.) Paul G.Wilson

= Hyalosperma simplex =

Species of plant

Hyalosperma simplex is a flowering plant in the family Asteraceae. It is an upright, annual herb with stems branching from the base and yellow or white flowers and is endemic to Western Australia.

== Description ==
Hyalosperma simplex is an upright, annual herb up to 10–15 cm (3.9–5.9 in) high with simple stems or sparingly branched from the base with a cottony appearance. The leaves are arranged opposite, rounded on one side, flat on the other, about 10 mm (0.39 in) long, pointed, occasional cottony hairs to smooth. The single yellow or white flower heads are at the end of branches and up to 2 cm (0.79 in) in diameter. The involucral bracts are in several rows, outer bracts ellitic-shaped, dry, light brown with occasional wooly hairs at the base. Flowering occurs from September to December and the fruit is an achene oblong to egg-shaped, 1–2 mm (0.039–0.079 in) long, surface rough with small, rounded protuberances or smooth, red-brown and about 15 mm (0.59 in) in diameter.

== Taxonomy and naming ==
This species was first described 1845 by Joachim Steetz who gave it the name Helipterum simplex. In 1989 Paul Graham Wilson changed the name to Hyalosperma simplex and the change was published in the journal Nuytsia. The specific epithet (simplex) means "simple, not divided" referring to the stems.

== Distribution and habitat ==
Hyalosperma simplex grows on sandy clay, loam or clay in wet locations including swamps and winter wet areas near and south of Perth in Western Australia.
