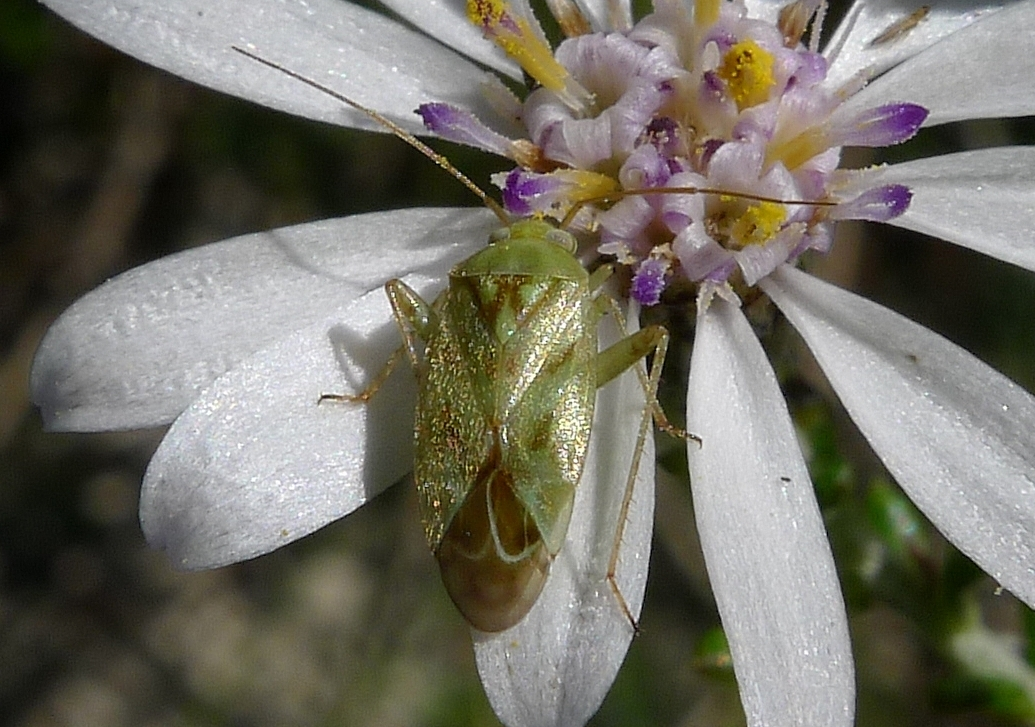

Scientific classification
- Kingdom: Plantae
- Clade: Tracheophytes
- Clade: Angiosperms
- Clade: Eudicots
- Clade: Asterids
- Order: Asterales
- Family: Asteraceae
- Genus: Olearia
- Species: O. paucidentata

Binomial name
- Olearia paucidentata (Steetz) Benth.

Synonyms
- List: Aster paucidentatus (Steetz) F.Muell. Eurybia paucidentata Steetz Eurybia paucidentata Steetz Eurybia paucidentata var. glabrata Steetz Eurybia paucidentata var. hispida Steetz Eurybia paucidentata Steetz var. paucidentata Eurybia paucidentata var. subracemosa Steetz Olearia paucidentata var. latifolia Benth. Olearia paucidentata (Steetz) F.Muell. ex Benth. var. paucidentata Shawia paucidentata (Steetz) Sch.Bip.

= Olearia paucidentata =

Species of Asteraceae

Olearia paucidentata, the autumn scrub daisy, is a species of flowering plant in the family Asteraceae and is endemic to the south-west of Western Australia. It is a shrub with variably-shaped leaves, and white, mauve or blue and mauve or yellow, daisy-like inflorescences.

== Description ==
Olearia paucidentata is a shrub that typically grows to a height of up to 1.2 m (3 ft 11 in), its stems and leaves somewhat sticky. The leaves are variably shaped, usually elliptic, egg-shaped, spoon-shaped, wedge-shaped or linear, 1–35 mm (0.039–1.378 in) long and 0.5–10 mm (0.020–0.394 in) wide on a petiole about 2 mm (0.079 in) long. Some leaves have up to four lobes on the edges. The heads or daisy-like "flowers" are arranged in panicles on the ends of branches on a short peduncle and are 10–25 mm (0.39–0.98 in) in diameter with a conical, top-shaped or cup-shaped involucre at the base. Each head has twelve to sixteen white, mauve or blue ray florets, the ligule 4.6–6.0 mm (0.18–0.24 in) long, surrounding 13 to 56 mauve or yellow disc florets. Flowering occurs throughout the year and the fruit is an achene 1.0–1.2 mm (0.039–0.047 in) long, the pappus with 21 to 33 long bristles and 10 to 16 short ones.

== Taxonomy ==
This daisy was first formally described in 1845 by Joachim Steetz who gave it the name Eurybia paucidentata in Johann Georg Christian Lehmann's Plantae Preissianae. In 1867 George Bentham changed the name to Olearia paucidentata in Flora Australiensis. The specific epithet (paucidentata) means "few-toothed", referring to the leaves.

== Distribution and habitat ==
Autumn scrub daisy is widespread and common in the south-west of Western Australia, where it grows in open forest, often in damp places like river banks and swamps.
