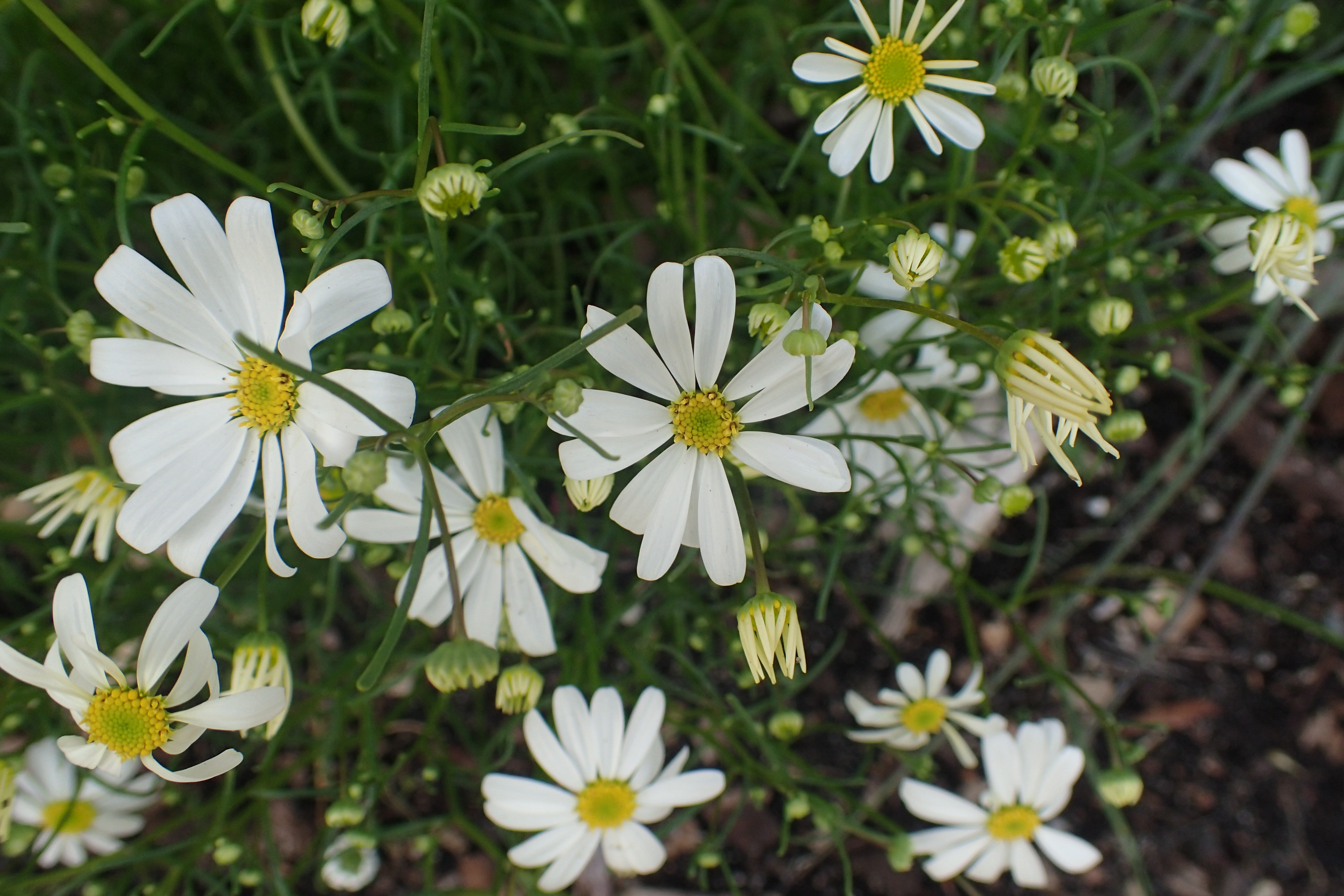

Scientific classification
- Kingdom: Plantae
- Clade: Tracheophytes
- Clade: Angiosperms
- Clade: Eudicots
- Clade: Asterids
- Order: Asterales
- Family: Asteraceae
- Genus: Brachyscome
- Species: B. bellidioides

Binomial name
- Brachyscome bellidioides Steetz

= Brachyscome bellidioides =

Species of flowering plant

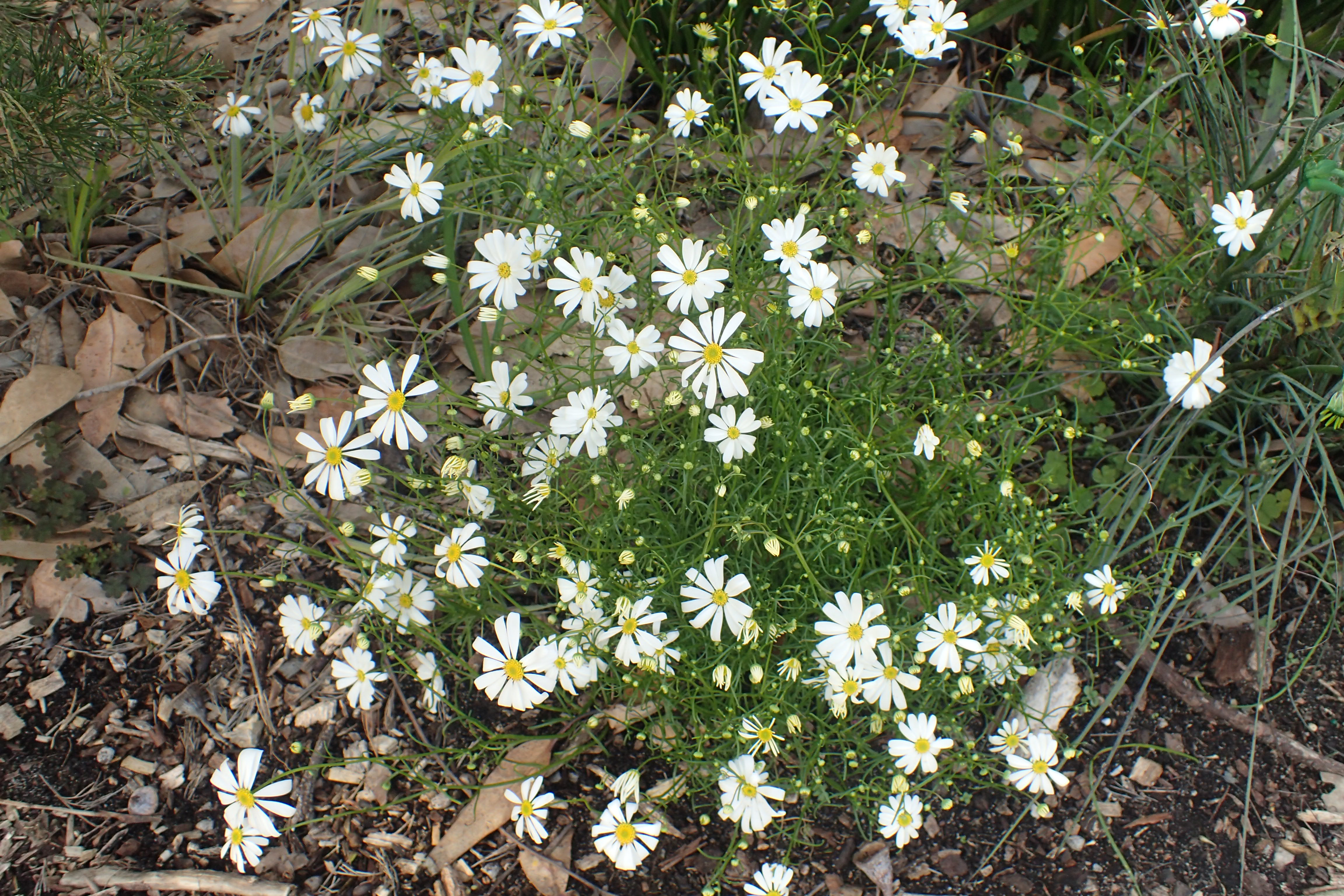
Habit in Kings Park

Brachyscome bellidioides is a species of flowering plant in the family Asteraceae and is endemic to the southwest of Western Australia. It is an annual herb with linear leaves and yellow and white daisy-like flowers.

== Description ==
Brachyscome bellidioides is a glabrous annual herb that typically grows to a height of 50–180 mm (2.0–7.1 in) tall. The leaves are mostly at, or near the base of the plant, linear to narrowly lance-shaped or narrowly elliptic, 4–30 mm (0.16–1.18 in) long and 0.8–2.2 mm (0.031–0.087 in) wide with one or two short teeth or lobes. The heads or daisy-like "flowers" have about 15 thin, leaf-like involucral bracts at the base, each head with about 15 to 26 white ray florets, the ligule 5–18 mm (0.20–0.71 in) long and 0.8–1.3 mm (0.031–0.051 in) wide, surrounding yellow disc florets. Flowering occurs from August to October and the fruit is a cypsela about 1.0–1.4 mm (0.039–0.055 in) long.

== Taxonomy and naming ==
Brachyscome bellidioides was first formally described in 1845 by Joachim Steetz in Lehmann's Plantae Preissianae. The specific epithet (bellidioides) means Bellis-like.

== Distribution and habitat ==
This species of daisy usually grows on sand in heathland and is found in near-coastal areas between Jurien Bay and King George Sound in the Jarrah Forest, Swan Coastal Plain and Warren bioregions of south-western Western Australia.

== Conservation status ==
Brachyscome bellidioides is listed as "not threatened" by the Government of Western Australia Department of Biodiversity, Conservation and Attractions.
