= Asteridea =

Asteridea may refer to:

- Sea star
- Asteridea (plant), a genus of plants in the family Asteraceae
