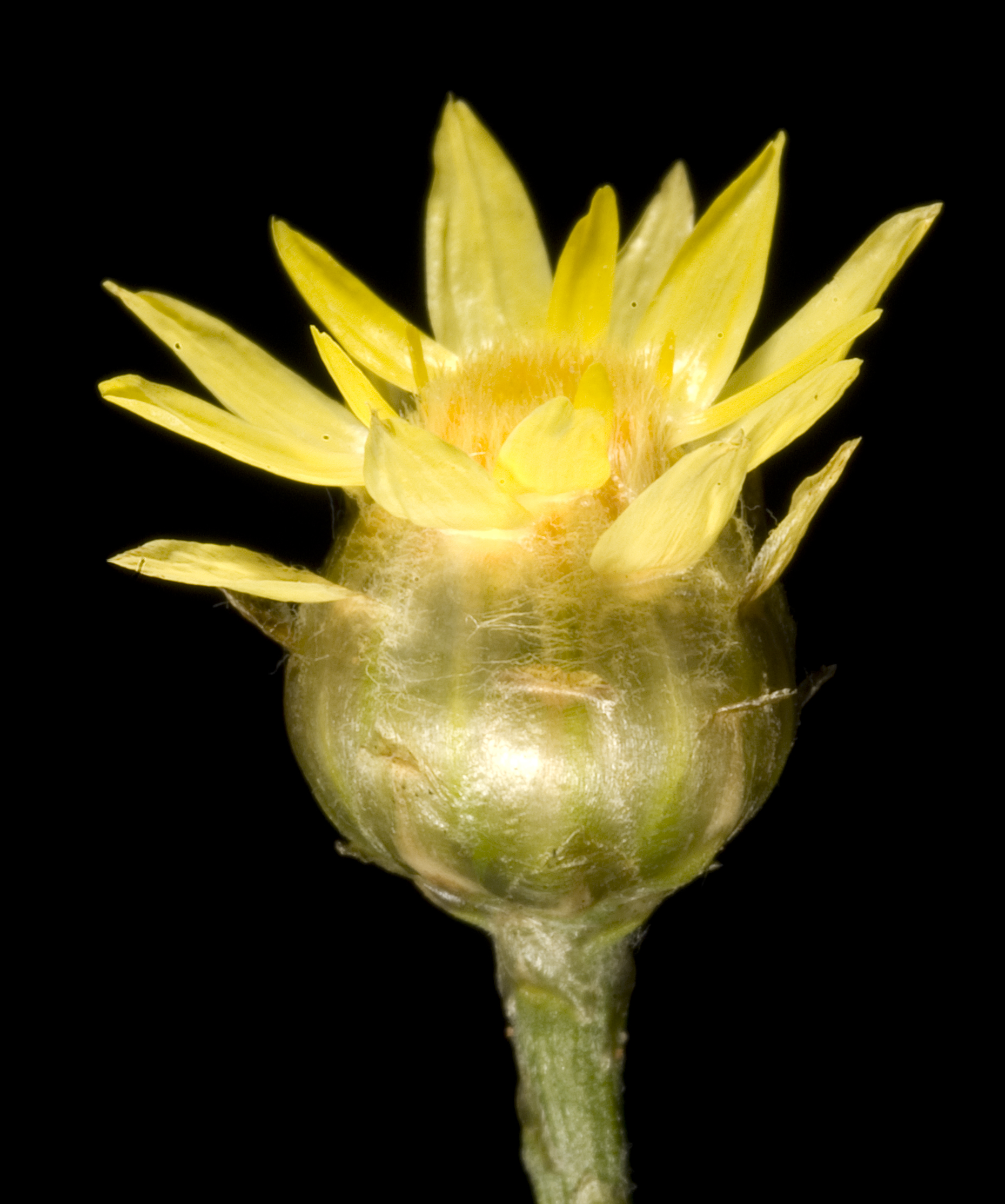

Scientific classification
- Kingdom: Plantae
- Clade: Tracheophytes
- Clade: Angiosperms
- Clade: Eudicots
- Clade: Asterids
- Order: Asterales
- Family: Asteraceae
- Genus: Hyalosperma
- Species: H. glutinosum

Binomial name
- Hyalosperma glutinosum Steetz

= Hyalosperma glutinosum =

Species of plant

Hyalosperma glustinosum is a plant in the Asteraceae family, native to Australia and found in all mainland states and territories except the Northern Territory. (However NSW PlantNET also excludes Queensland.) It was first described in 1845 by Joachim Steetz.

It is an erect annual herb, growing from 10 to 20 cm high. Its yellow flowers are seen from July to November.
