= Asteridea nivea =

Scientific classification
- Kingdom: Plantae
- Clade: Tracheophytes
- Clade: Angiosperms
- Clade: Eudicots
- Clade: Asterids
- Order: Asterales
- Family: Asteraceae
- Genus: Asteridea
- Species: A. nivea

Binomial name
- Asteridea nivea (Steetz) Kroner
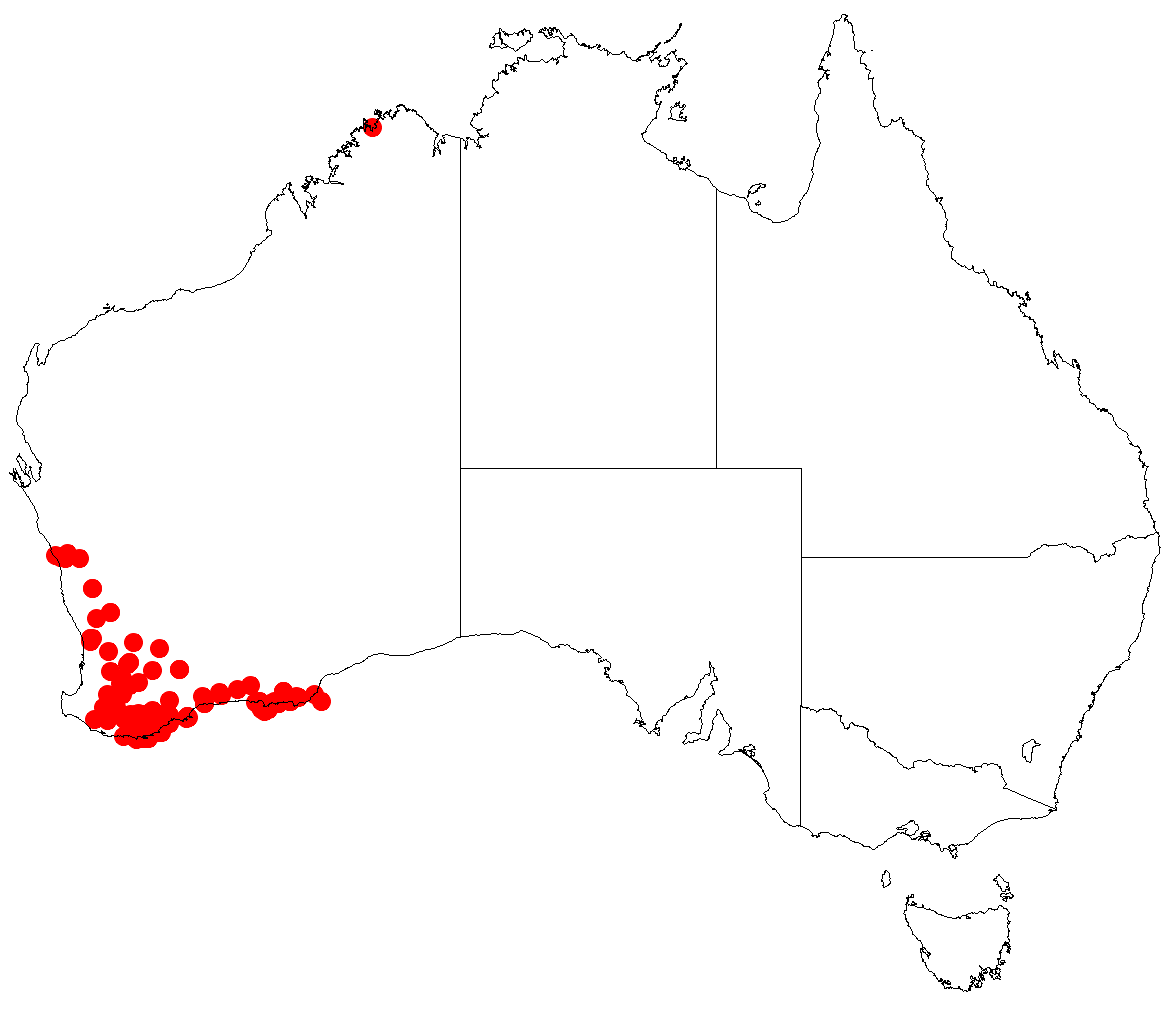
- Occurrence data from AVH

Synonyms
- Asteridea stricta A.Gray; Athrixia nivea Druce; Athrixia nivea Domin; Athrixia stricta Benth. Athrixia stricta var. suffruticosa Benth. Chrysodiscus niveus Steetz

Species of flowering plant

Asteridea nivea is a herb in the Asteraceae family, which is endemic to Western Australia. It was first described in 1845 by Joachim Steetz as Chrysodiscus niveus. In 1980, G. Kroner assigned it to the genus, Asteridea, giving it the name Asteridea nivea. It is a perennial herb, sometimes erect, sometimes low-spreading which grows on sandy soils often over granite, laterite, or limestone to heights from 10 cm to 60 cm, in rock crevices, on ridges and coastal cliffs. Its white to white-pink flowers may seen from April to May or August to September in Beard's South-West Province, that is, the IBRA regions of Avon Wheatbelt, Esperance Plains, Geraldton Sandplains, Jarrah Forest, Mallee, and Warren.
