= Tremandra diffusa =

Scientific classification
- Kingdom: Plantae
- Clade: Tracheophytes
- Clade: Angiosperms
- Clade: Eudicots
- Clade: Rosids
- Order: Oxalidales
- Family: Elaeocarpaceae
- Genus: Tremandra
- Species: T. diffusa

Binomial name
- Tremandra diffusa R.Br ex DC.

Species of flowering plant

Tremandra diffusa is a species of flowering plant in the family Elaeocarpaceae. It is a small shrub with white flowers and green oval shaped leaves.

== Description ==
Tremandra diffusa is a small, sprawling shrub to 0.05–0.3 m (2.0 in – 11.8 in) high. It has dark green, broad egg-shaped leaves 6–18 mm (0.24–0.71 in) long, 4–15 mm (0.16–0.59 in) wide, more or less smooth on upper surface, underside sparsely covered with short star-shaped hairs, occasionally toothed margins and a petiole about 1 mm (0.039 in) long. The small white flowers are up to 8 mm (0.31 in) wide with pale anthers. The pedicel thread-like and sometimes longer than the leaves. The fruit is a hairy, twin capsule. Flowering occurs from September to January.

== Taxonomy and naming ==
Tremandra diffusa was first formally described in 1824 by Augustin Pyramus de Candolle from an unpublished description by Robert Brown and de Candolle's description was published in Prodromus Systematis Naturalis Regni Vegetabilis. The specific epithet (diffusa) is derived from the Latin diffusus meaning "spread out", "extended" or "diffuse", usually referring to the habit.

== Distribution and habitat ==
The species is found in the south-west corner of Western Australia growing on flatlands, outcrops and road verges in loam, sand and lateritic soil.
