= Ambassa hochstetteri =

Conservation status
- Least Concern (IUCN 3.1)

Scientific classification
- Kingdom: Plantae
- Clade: Tracheophytes
- Clade: Angiosperms
- Clade: Eudicots
- Clade: Asterids
- Order: Asterales
- Family: Asteraceae
- Subfamily: Vernonioideae
- Tribe: Vernonieae
- Genus: Ambassa; Steetz
- Species: A. hochstetteri

Binomial name
- Ambassa hochstetteri (Sch.Bip. ex Hochst.) Steetz

Synonyms
- Cacalia hochstetterii (Sch.Bip. ex Hochst.) Kuntze; Cacalia jugalis (Oliv. & Hiern) Kuntze; Vernonia dekindtii O.Hoffm.; Vernonia hochstetteri Sch.Bip. ex Hochst. (1841) (basionym); Vernonia hochstetteri var. dekindtii (O.Hoffm.) C.Jeffrey; Vernonia hochstetteri var. kivuensis (Humbert & Staner) C.Jeffrey; Vernonia jugalis Oliv. & Hiern; Vernonia kivuensis Humbert & Staner; Vernonia koestlinii Hochst.

Species of flowering plant

Ambassa hochstetteri is a species of flowering plant in the family Asteraceae. It is the sole species in genus Ambassa. It is a shrub or tree native to central and eastern tropical Africa, ranging from Gabon and Angola to Tanzania and Ethiopia. It grows in Afromontane moist forest and bushlands from 1000–2400 metres elevation.
