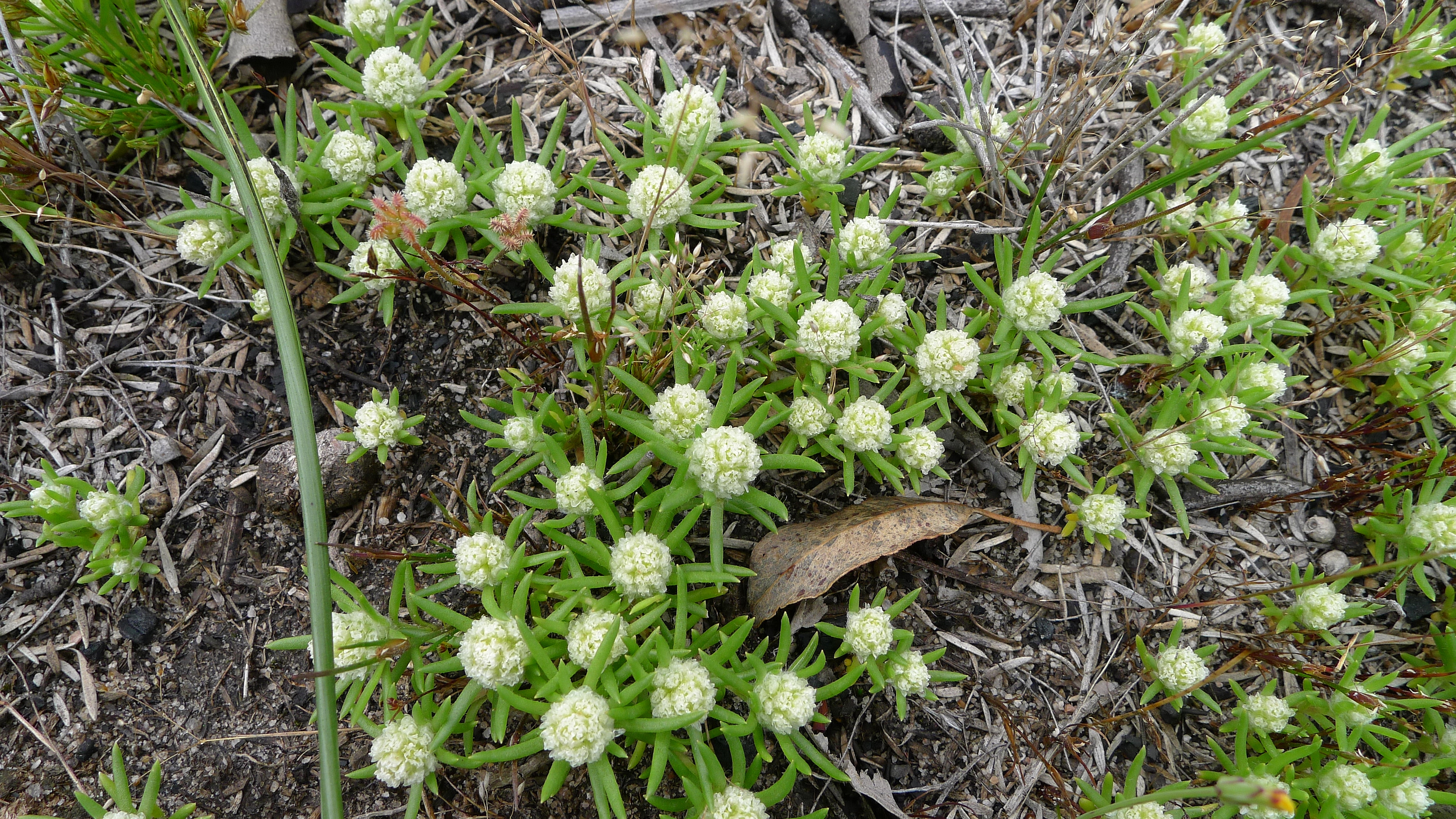

Scientific classification
- Kingdom: Plantae
- Clade: Tracheophytes
- Clade: Angiosperms
- Clade: Eudicots
- Clade: Asterids
- Order: Asterales
- Family: Asteraceae
- Genus: Hyalosperma
- Species: H. demissum

Binomial name
- Hyalosperma demissum (A.Gray) Paul G.Wilson

= Hyalosperma demissum =

Moss sunray

Species of plant

Hyalosperma demissum, commonly known as moss sunray, is a flowering plant in the family Asteraceae. It is a small, annual herb with whitish yellow flowers and is endemic to Australia.

== Description ==
Hyalosperma demissum is a rounded, small annual to 5–20 mm (0.20–0.79 in) high and sparsely covered with long, soft, straight hairs or smooth. The leaves are linear and more or less triangular in cross-section, about 5 mm (0.20 in) long, about 0.2 mm (0.0079 in) wide and gradually tapering to a point. The whitish-yellow flowers are in dense clusters amongst the foliage, the bracts are arranged in 3-4 rows, broadly oblong to oval shaped, outer bracts 2–2.5 mm (0.079–0.098 in) long, almost translucent, light green, silvery or light yellowish brown. The florets are in groupings of 15-25 and the corolla has 3 or 4 lobes. Flowering occurs from September to December and the fruit is a dry, one-seeded, compressed, egg-shaped, warty and about 0.7 mm (0.028 in) long.

== Taxonomy and naming ==
This species was described in 1852 by Asa Gray and given the name Pteropogon demissus. In 1989 Paul G.Wilson changed the name to Hyalosperma demissum and the description was published in Nuytsia. The specific epithet (demissum) means "low-lying".

== Distribution and habitat ==
Moss-sunray grows on clay, loam, sand plains, shallow rocky soils and winter-wet locations in Western Australia, Tasmania, New South Wales, Victoria and South Australia.
