= Asteridea archeri =

Conservation status
- Priority One — Poorly Known Taxa (DEC)

Scientific classification
- Kingdom: Plantae
- Clade: Tracheophytes
- Clade: Angiosperms
- Clade: Eudicots
- Clade: Asterids
- Order: Asterales
- Family: Asteraceae
- Genus: Asteridea
- Species: A. archeri

Binomial name
- Asteridea archeri P.S.Short

Species of flowering plant

Asteridea archeri is a herb in the family Asteraceae, which is endemic to Western Australia. It was first described in 2000 by Philip Short. It is found growing on gypsum dunes in salt lakes to heights from 20 cm to 1 m. Its white flowers may seen from September to October in Beard's Eremaean Province. There are no synonyms.
