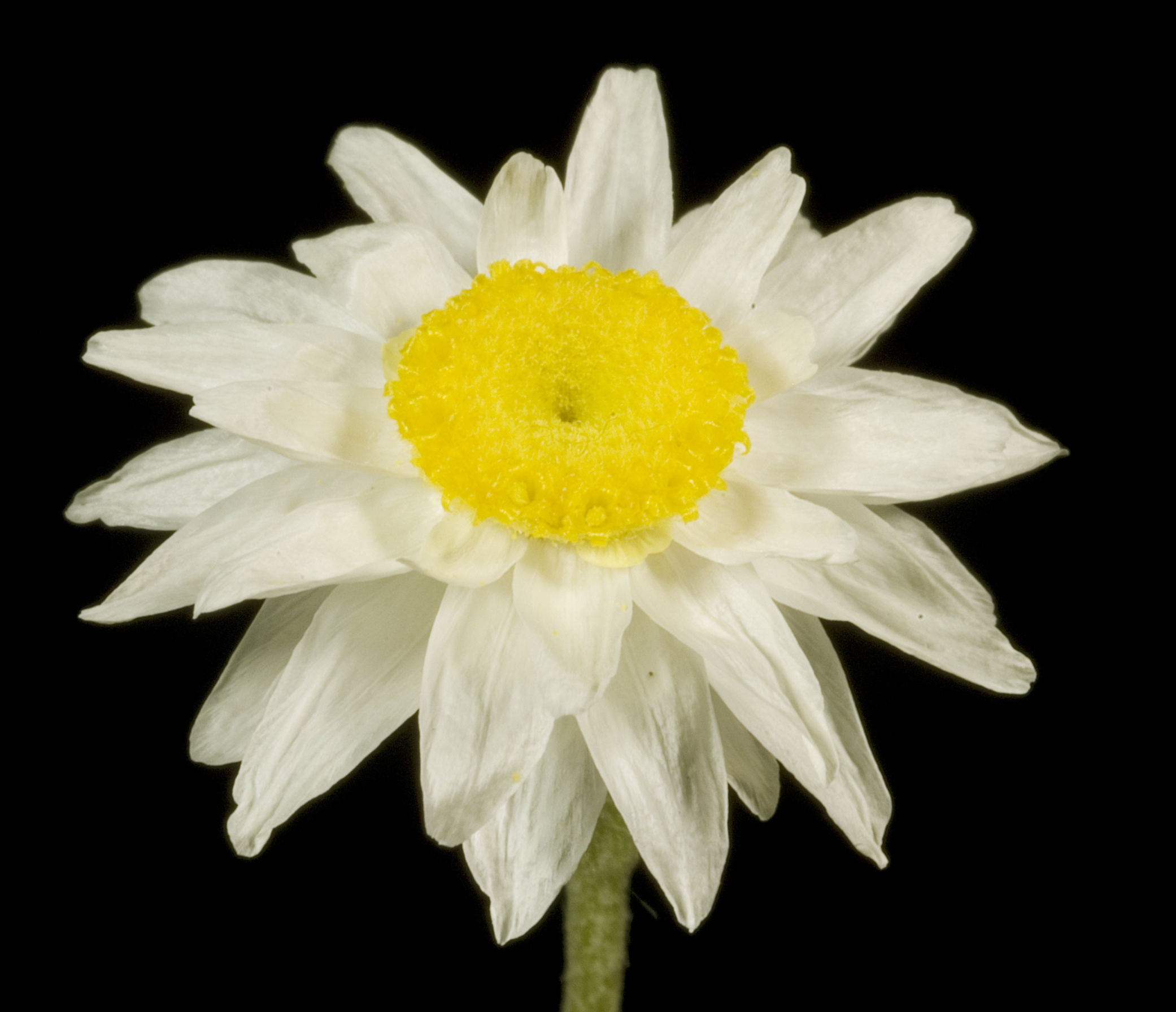

Scientific classification
- Kingdom: Plantae
- Clade: Tracheophytes
- Clade: Angiosperms
- Clade: Eudicots
- Clade: Asterids
- Order: Asterales
- Family: Asteraceae
- Genus: Hyalosperma
- Species: H. cotula

Binomial name
- Hyalosperma cotula (Benth.) Paul G.Wilson

Synonyms
- Helichrysum cotula Benth. Argyrocome cotula Kuntze; Helipterum citrinum Steetz; Helipterum cotula DC. Helipterum cotula var. ramosissimum Helipterum cotula var. simplex Roccardia cotula (DC.) Voss

= Hyalosperma cotula =

Species of plant

Hyalosperma cotula is a plant in the Asteraceae family, native to Western Australia, South Australia, and Victoria. It was first described in 1837 by George Bentham as Helichrysum cotula, but was transferred to the genus, Hyalosperma, in 1989 by Paul Wilson.

It is a slender, erect, annual herb, growing from 0.05 to 0.25 m high, in damp places. The white /yellow flowers may be seen from July to December.
