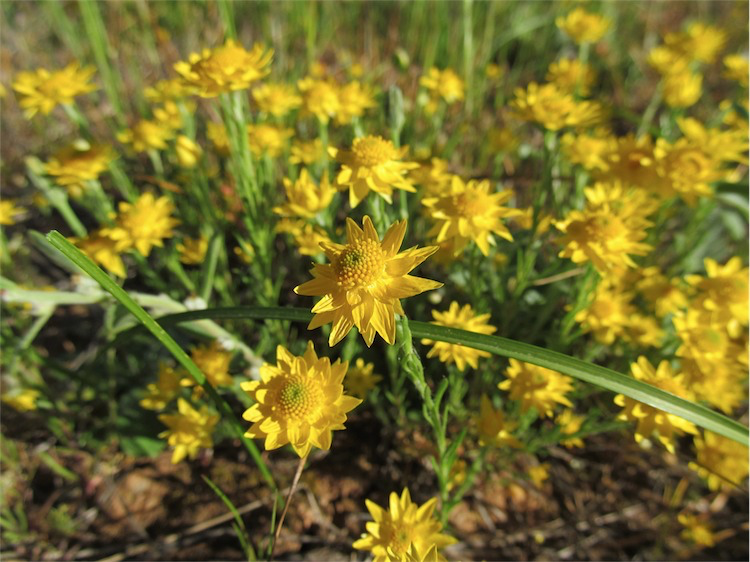

Scientific classification
- Kingdom: Plantae
- Clade: Tracheophytes
- Clade: Angiosperms
- Clade: Eudicots
- Clade: Asterids
- Order: Asterales
- Family: Asteraceae
- Genus: Hyalosperma
- Species: H. praecox

Binomial name
- Hyalosperma praecox (F.Muell.) Paul G.Wilson

= Hyalosperma praecox =

Fine-leaf sunray

Species of plant

Hyalosperma praecox commonly known as fine-leaf sunray, is a flowering plant in the family Asteraceae. It is an upright, annual herb with stems branching from the base and yellow or white flowers and grows in New South Wales and Victoria.

== Description ==
Hyalosperma praecox is an upright, multi-stemmed annual 10–20 cm (3.9–7.9 in) high with stems arising from the base. The leaves are narrow, green, 5–40 mm (0.20–1.57 in) long, decreasing in size toward the apex, upper leaves with a dry appendage, and tapering to a point. The white or yellow flowers are borne singly, bracts in several rows, outer bracts about 5 mm (0.20 in) long, inner bracts about 7–10 mm (0.28–0.39 in) long, corolla has five lobes and about 2 mm (0.079 in) long. Flowering occurs in spring and the fruit is an oval-shaped cypsela about 1 mm (0.039 in) long and may be either smooth or warty.

== Taxonomy and naming ==
This species was first described by Ferdinand von Mueller and given the name Helipterum praecox. In 1989 Paul Graham Wilson changed the name to Hyalosperma praecox and the description was published in Nuytsia. The specific epithet (praecox) means "early".

== Distribution and habitat ==
Fine-leaf sunray grows in open forests or grasslands on sand or heavy loam soils in New South Wales and Victoria.
