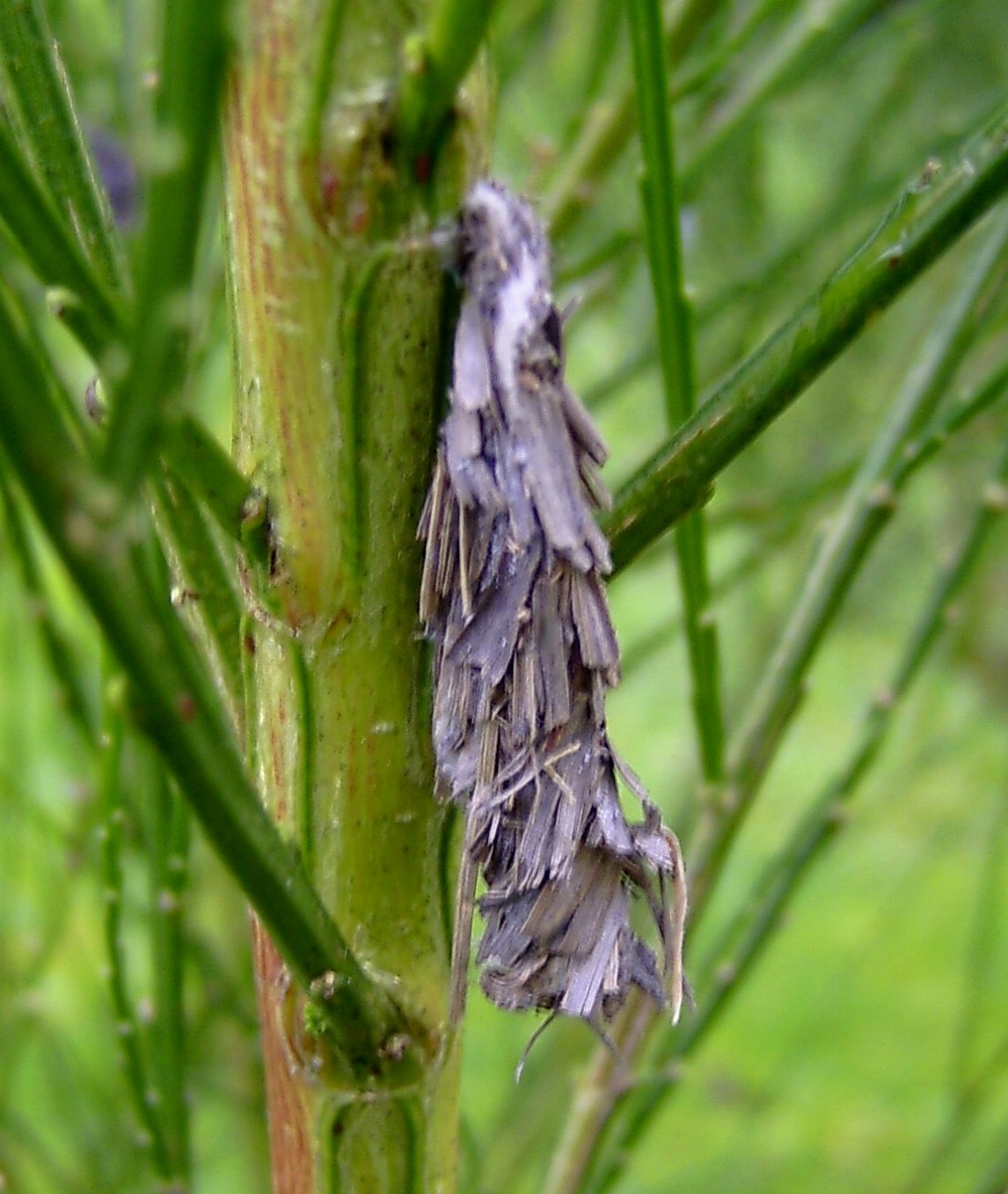
- Case
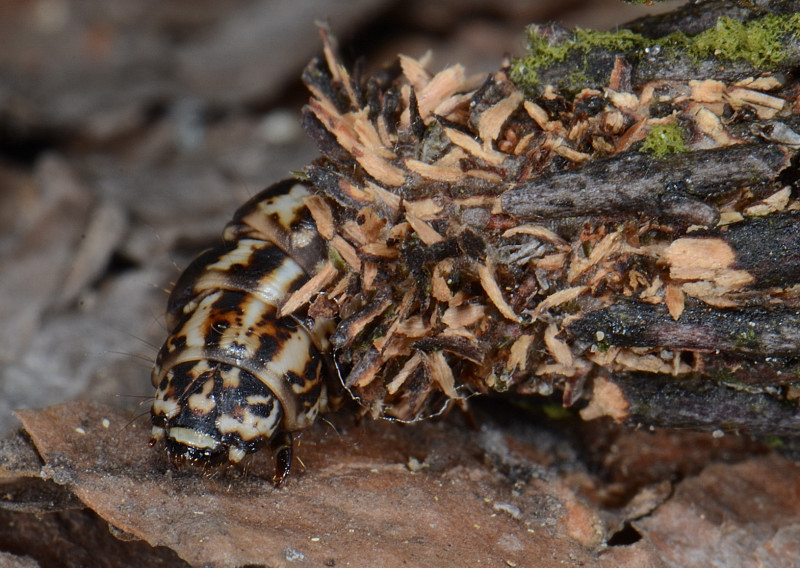
- Larva

Scientific classification
- Domain: Eukaryota
- Kingdom: Animalia
- Phylum: Arthropoda
- Class: Insecta
- Order: Lepidoptera
- Family: Psychidae
- Genus: Pachythelia
- Species: P. villosella

Binomial name
- Pachythelia villosella (Ochsenheimer, 1810)

Synonyms
- Psyche villosella Ochsenheimer, 1810

= Pachythelia villosella =

Species of moth

Pachythelia villosella is a moth of the Psychidae family. It is found in Europe.

The wingspan is 13–15 mm for males. Head, thorax, and abdomen pale brownish-ochreous. Forewings and hindwings thinly haired, dark brown or grey brown; veins and base of cilia darker. Females are wingless and have a rounded frontal prominence. Adults are on wing in June and July.

The larvae feed on Calluna and Sarothamnus species from within a case.
