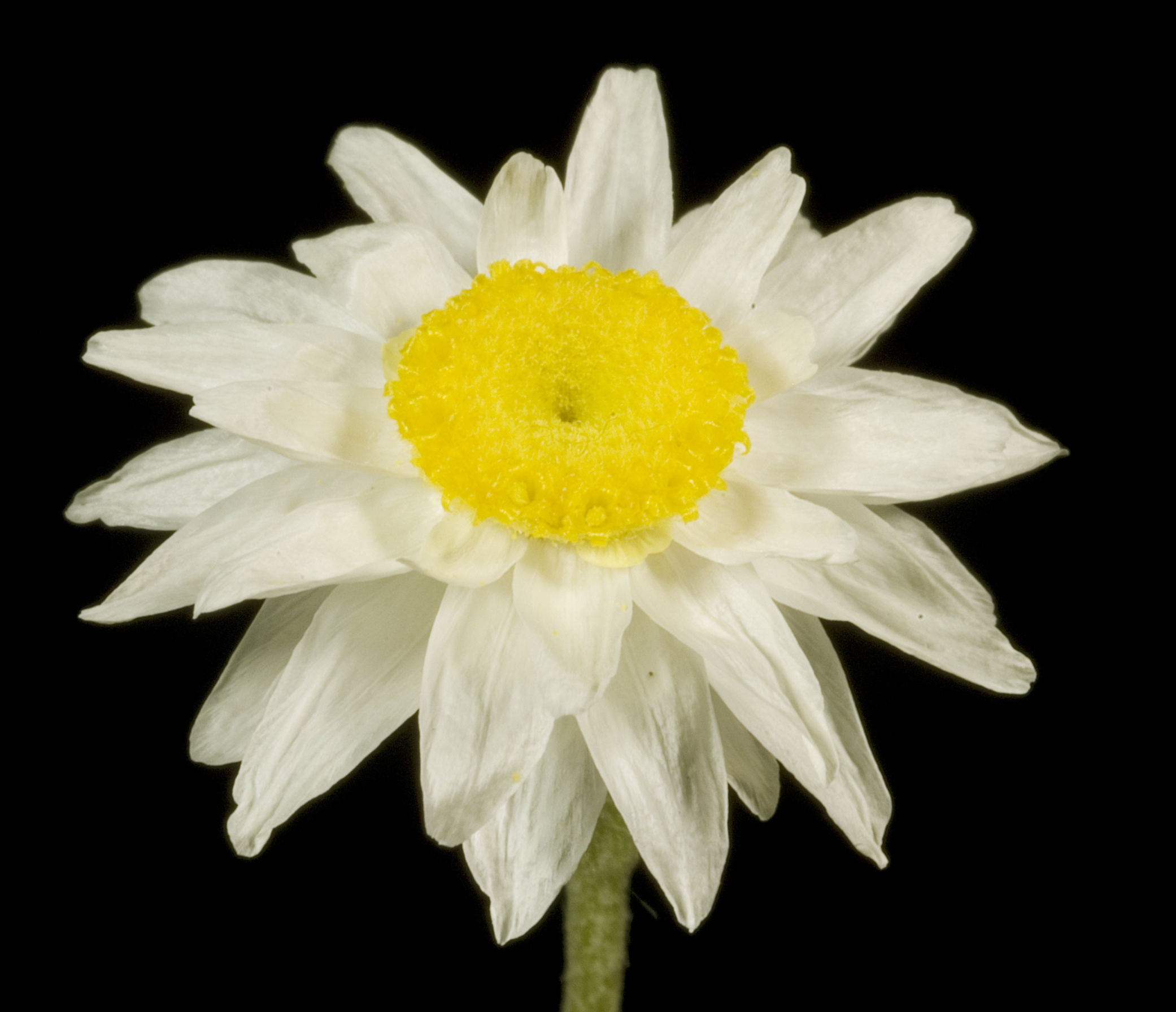
- Hyalosperma cotula

Scientific classification
- Kingdom: Plantae
- Clade: Tracheophytes
- Clade: Angiosperms
- Clade: Eudicots
- Clade: Asterids
- Order: Asterales
- Family: Asteraceae
- Subfamily: Asteroideae
- Tribe: Gnaphalieae
- Genus: Hyalosperma; Steetz

Synonyms
- Helipterum section Pachypterum Steetz

= Hyalosperma =

Genus of flowering plants

Hyalosperma is a genus of Australian flowering plants in the family Asteraceae.

Species

The species occur in all 6 states of Australia but not in the Northern Territory.

- Hyalosperma cotula (Benth.) Paul G.Wilson
- Hyalosperma demissum (A.Gray) Paul G.Wilson - Moss Sunray
- Hyalosperma glutinosum Steetz - Golden Sunray
- Hyalosperma praecox (F.Muell.) Paul G.Wilson - Mayweed Sunray
- Hyalosperma pusillum (Turcz.) Paul G.Wilson
- Hyalosperma semisterile (F.Muell.) Paul G.Wilson - Orange Sunray
- Hyalosperma simplex (Steetz) Paul G.Wilson
- Hyalosperma stoveae (D.A.Cooke) Paul G.Wilson - Dwarf Sunray
- Hyalosperma strictum Steetz
- Hyalosperma zacchaeus (S.Moore) Paul G.Wilson
