= Chthonocephalus tomentellus =

Scientific classification
- Kingdom: Plantae
- Clade: Tracheophytes
- Clade: Angiosperms
- Clade: Eudicots
- Clade: Asterids
- Order: Asterales
- Family: Asteraceae
- Genus: Chthonocephalus
- Species: C. tomentellus

Binomial name
- Chthonocephalus tomentellus (F.Muell.) Benth.

Species of flowering plant

Chthonocephalus tomentellus is an annual herb in the family Asteraceae. It is endemic to Western Australia, occurring in saline depressions. Yellow flowers are produced between August and November (late winter to late spring) in its native range. The species was first formally described as Lachnothalamus tomentellus by botanist Ferdinand von Mueller in 1863 in Fragmenta Phytographiae Australiae from a type specimen collected near the mouth of the Murchison River.
