= Siemssenia =

Scientific classification
- Kingdom: Plantae
- Clade: Tracheophytes
- Clade: Angiosperms
- Clade: Eudicots
- Clade: Asterids
- Order: Asterales
- Family: Asteraceae
- Subfamily: Asteroideae
- Tribe: Gnaphalieae
- Genus: Siemssenia; Steetz

Species
- Siemssenia capillaris Steetz; Siemssenia microcephala (Benth.) Jeane

Genus of flowering plants

Siemssenia is a genus of flowering plants in the family Asteraceae. It includes two species native to Australia.

- Siemssenia capillaris Steetz
- Siemssenia microcephala (Benth.) Jeane
