= Asteridea asteroides =

Scientific classification
- Kingdom: Plantae
- Clade: Tracheophytes
- Clade: Angiosperms
- Clade: Eudicots
- Clade: Asterids
- Order: Asterales
- Family: Asteraceae
- Genus: Asteridea
- Species: A. asteroides

Binomial name
- Asteridea asteroides (Turcz.) Kroner
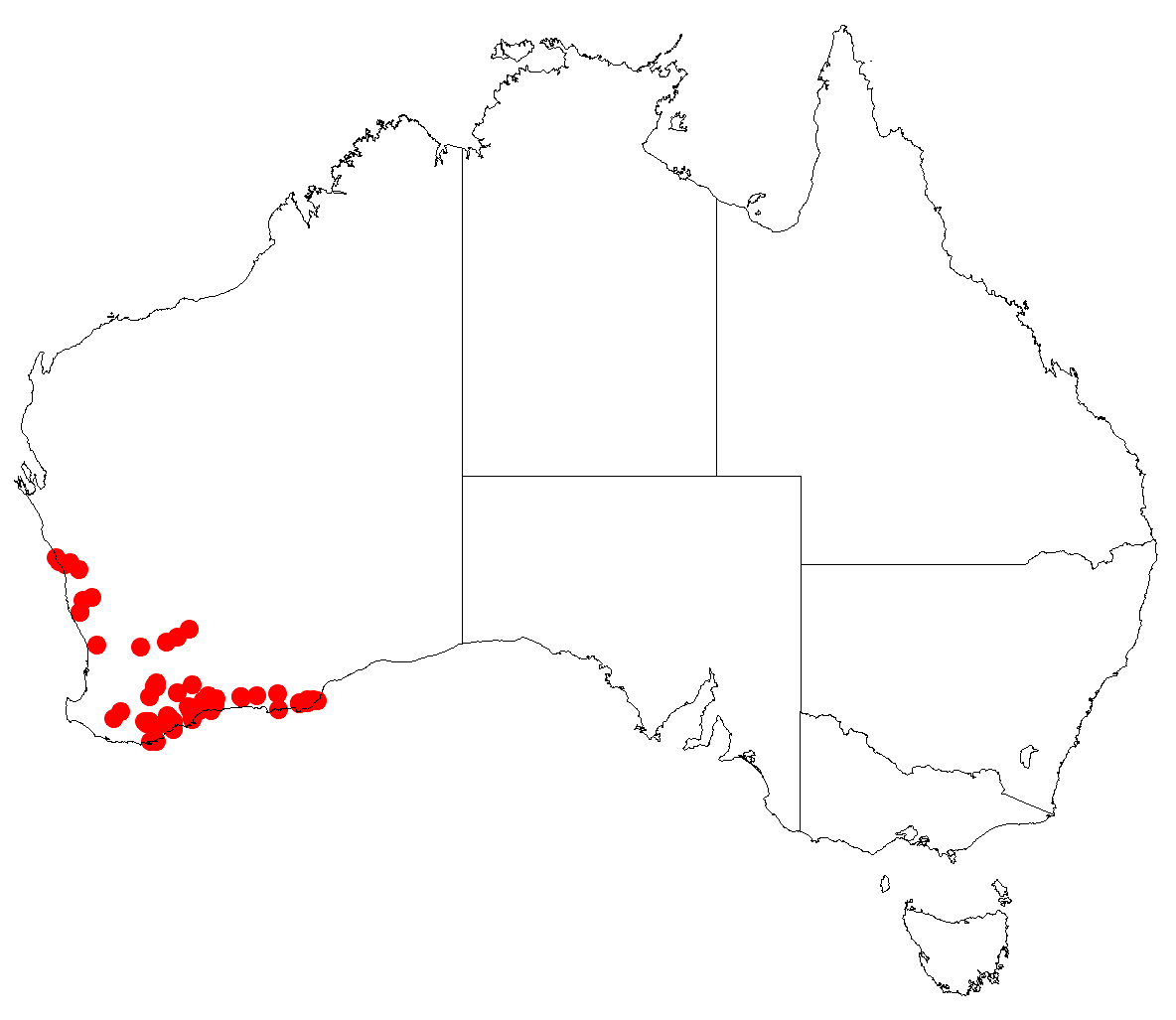
- Occurrence data from AVH

Synonyms
- Asteridea multiceps A.Gray; Athrixia asteroides (Turcz.) C.A.Gardner; Athrixia multiceps Benth. Athrixia multiceps var. tenella Benth. Trichostegia asteroides Turcz.

Species of flowering plant

Asteridea asteroides is a herb in the Asteraceae family, which is endemic to Western Australia. It was first described in 1853 by Nikolai Turczaninow as Trichostegia asteroides. In 1980, G. Kroner assigned it to the genus, Asteridea, giving it the name Asteridea asteroides. It is a perennial herb, growing on sand or gravelly sand to heights of from 5 cm to 30 cm. Its white flowers may seen from August to November in Beard's South-West Province.
