= Chthonocephalus =

Scientific classification
- Kingdom: Plantae
- Clade: Tracheophytes
- Clade: Angiosperms
- Clade: Eudicots
- Clade: Asterids
- Order: Asterales
- Family: Asteraceae
- Subfamily: Asteroideae
- Tribe: Gnaphalieae
- Genus: Chthonocephalus; Steetz

Synonyms
- Chamaesphaerion A.Gray

Genus of flowering plants

Chthonocephalus is a genus of annual herbs in the family Asteraceae. The genus is endemic to Australia, with species occurring in all mainland states.

Species

- Chthonocephalus muellerianus P.S.Short
- Chthonocephalus multiceps J.H.Willis
- Chthonocephalus oldfieldianus P.S.Short
- Chthonocephalus pseudevax Steetz - Wooly Groundheads
- Chthonocephalus spathulatus P.S.Short
- Chthonocephalus tomentellus (F.Muell.) Benth.
- Chthonocephalus viscosus P.S.Short
