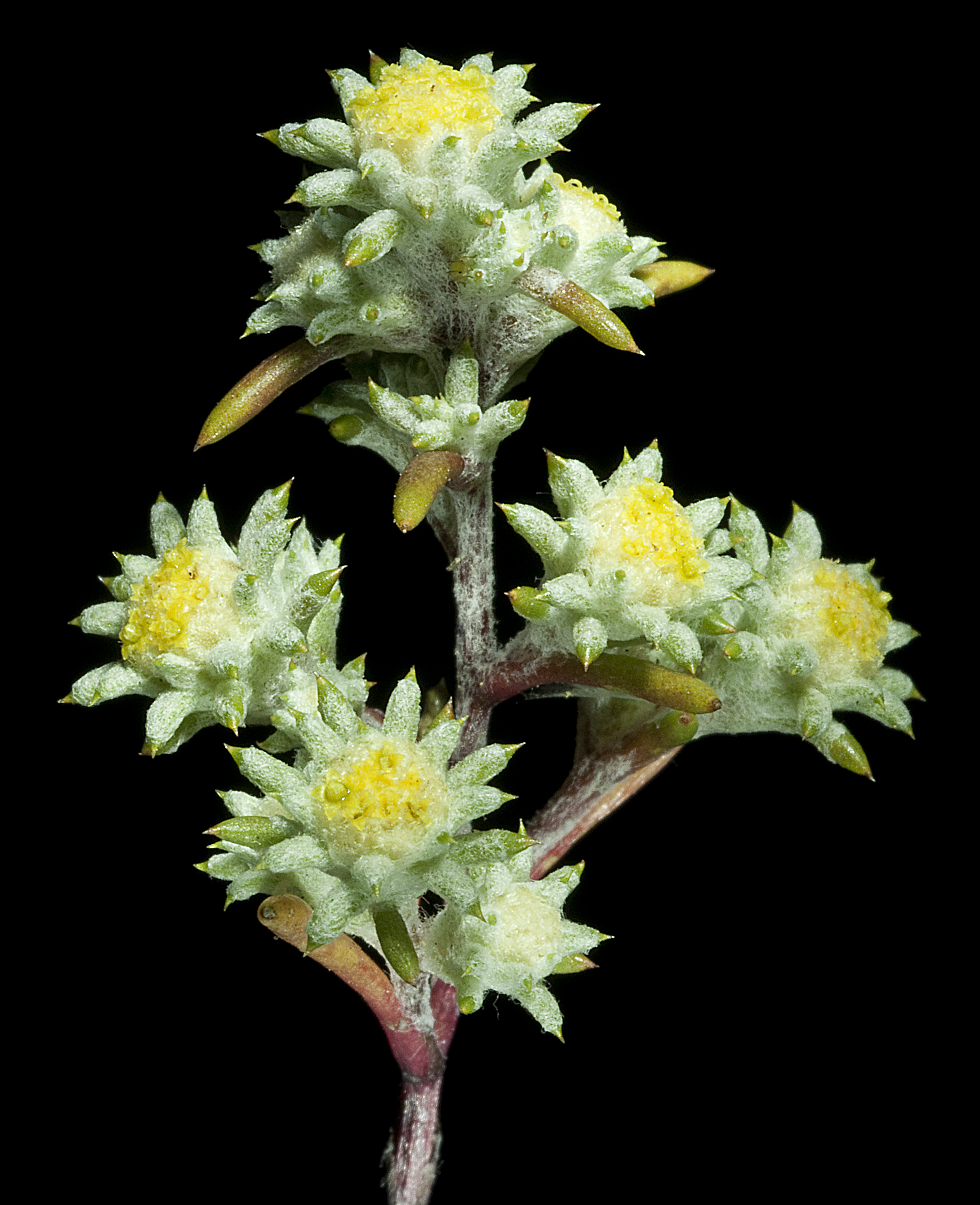
- Pogonolepis stricta

Scientific classification
- Kingdom: Plantae
- Clade: Tracheophytes
- Clade: Angiosperms
- Clade: Eudicots
- Clade: Asterids
- Order: Asterales
- Family: Asteraceae
- Subfamily: Asteroideae
- Tribe: Gnaphalieae
- Genus: Pogonolepis; Steetz

Type species
- Pogonolepis stricta Steetz

Synonyms
- Skirrhophorus sect. Pogonolepis (Steetz) A.Gray

= Pogonolepis =

Genus of plants

Pogonolepis is a genus of Australian plants in the tribe Gnaphalieae within the family Asteraceae.

== Species ==
As of August 2023, Plants of the World Online accepts four species:

- Pogonolepis lanigera (Ewart & Jean White) P.S.Short - Western Australia
- Pogonolepis smegma (Joseph Dixon) P.S.Short - Eastern Australia
- Pogonolepis muelleriana (Sond.) P.S.Short - New South Wales, Victoria, South Australia, Western Australia
- Pogonolepis stricta Steetz - Western Australia

As of August 2023, other sources list only three species, omitting Pogonolepis lanigera, which is treated as a synonym of Pogonolepis stricta.
