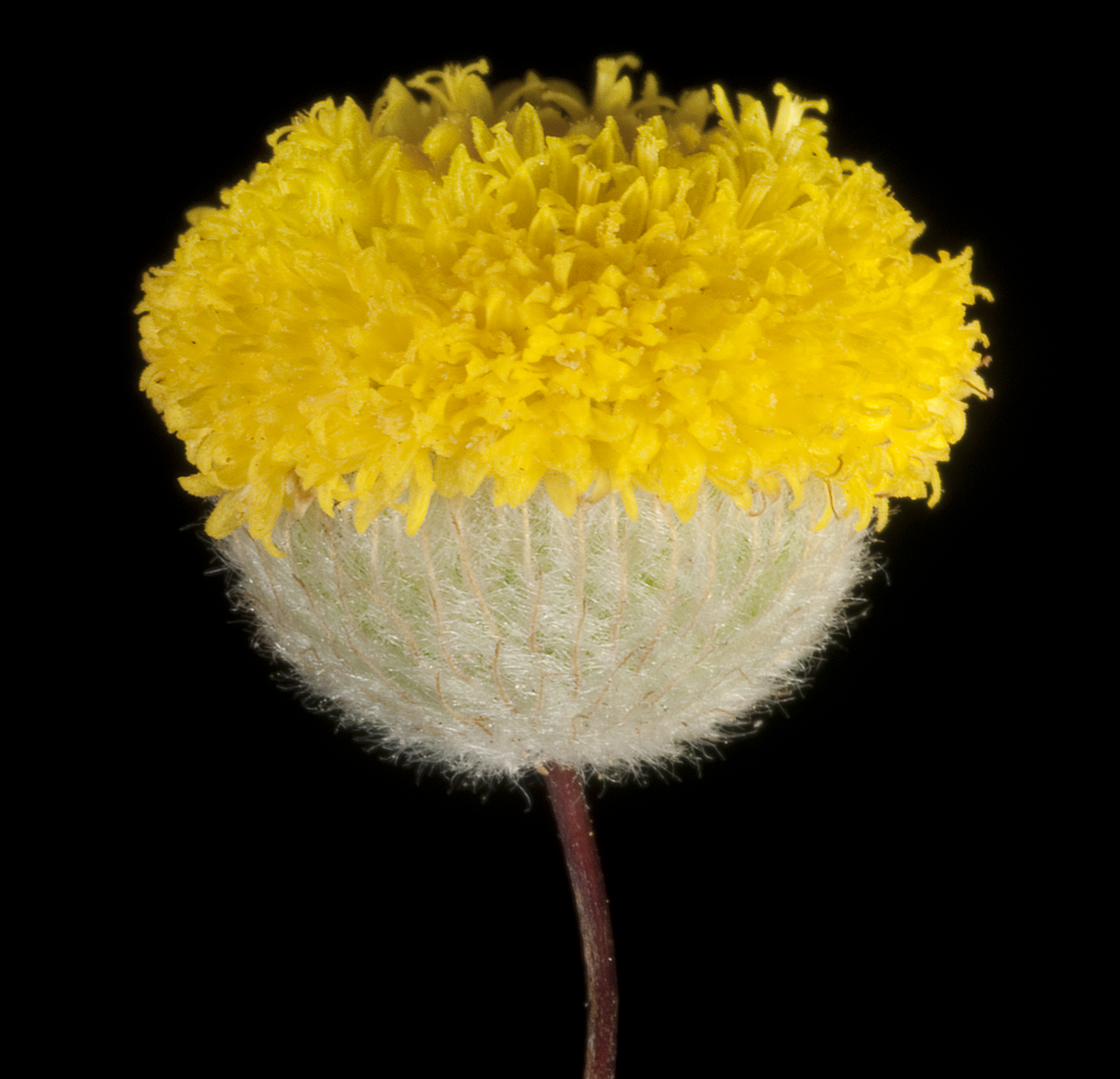
- Asteridea chaetopoda

Scientific classification
- Kingdom: Plantae
- Clade: Embryophytes
- Clade: Tracheophytes
- Clade: Spermatophytes
- Clade: Angiosperms
- Clade: Eudicots
- Clade: Asterids
- Order: Asterales
- Family: Asteraceae
- Genus: Asteridea
- Species: A. chaetopoda

Binomial name
- Asteridea chaetopoda Lindl.
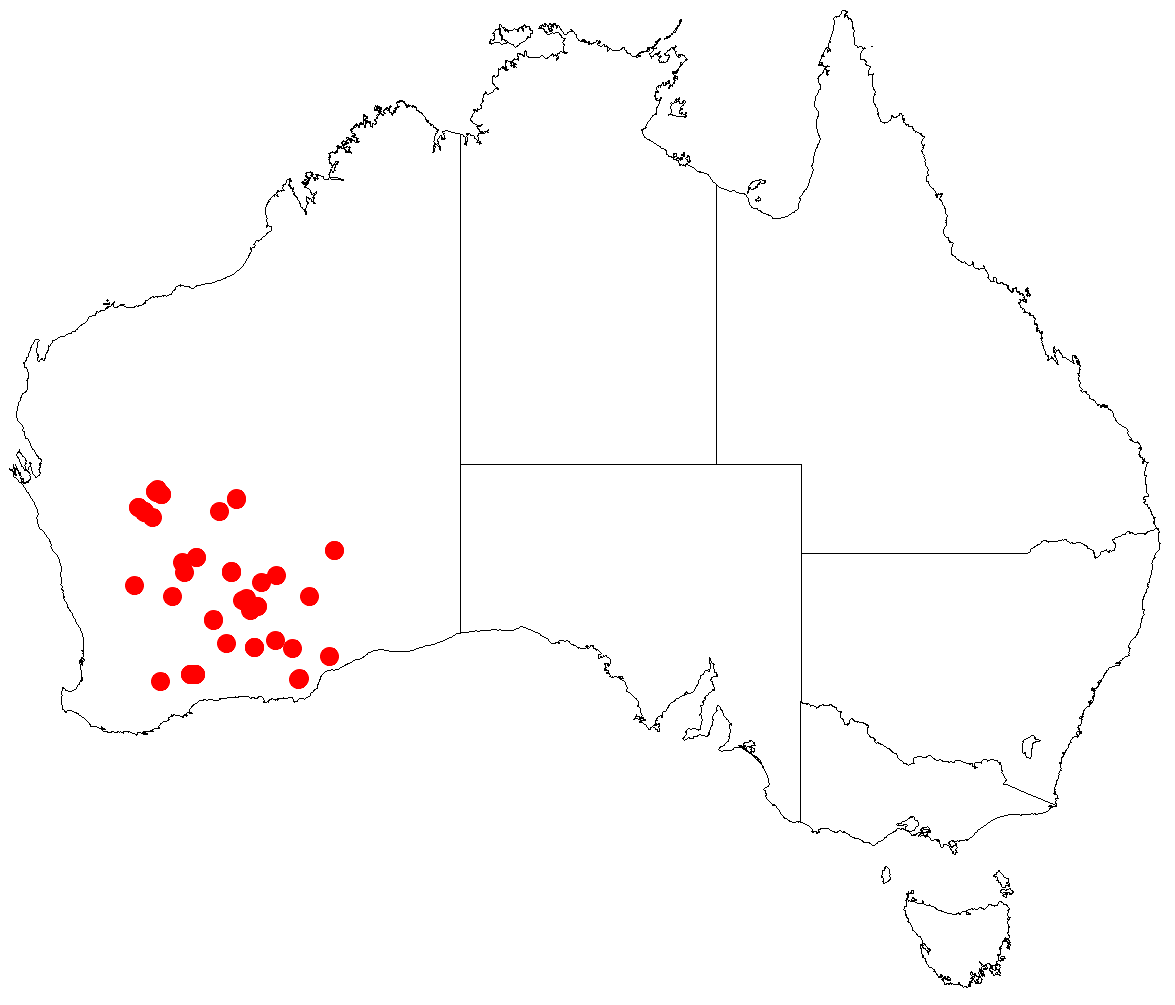
- Occurrence data from Australasian Virtual Herbarium\AVH

Synonyms
- Athrixia chaetopoda F.Muell.

= Asteridea chaetopoda =

Species of flowering plant

Asteridea chaetopoda is a species of herb in the Asteraceae family, which is endemic to Western Australia, in the south-west. It was first described in 1876 as Athrixia chaetopoda by Ferdinand von Mueller, and allocated to the genus, Asteridea, in 1980 by G. Kroner. It is a perennial herb, growing on sandy soils, on limestone and on gypsum, to heights from 5 cm to 30 cm. Its yellow flowers may seen from August to November on salt lakes, stony rises, and dunes of Beard's Eremaean and South-West Provinces.
