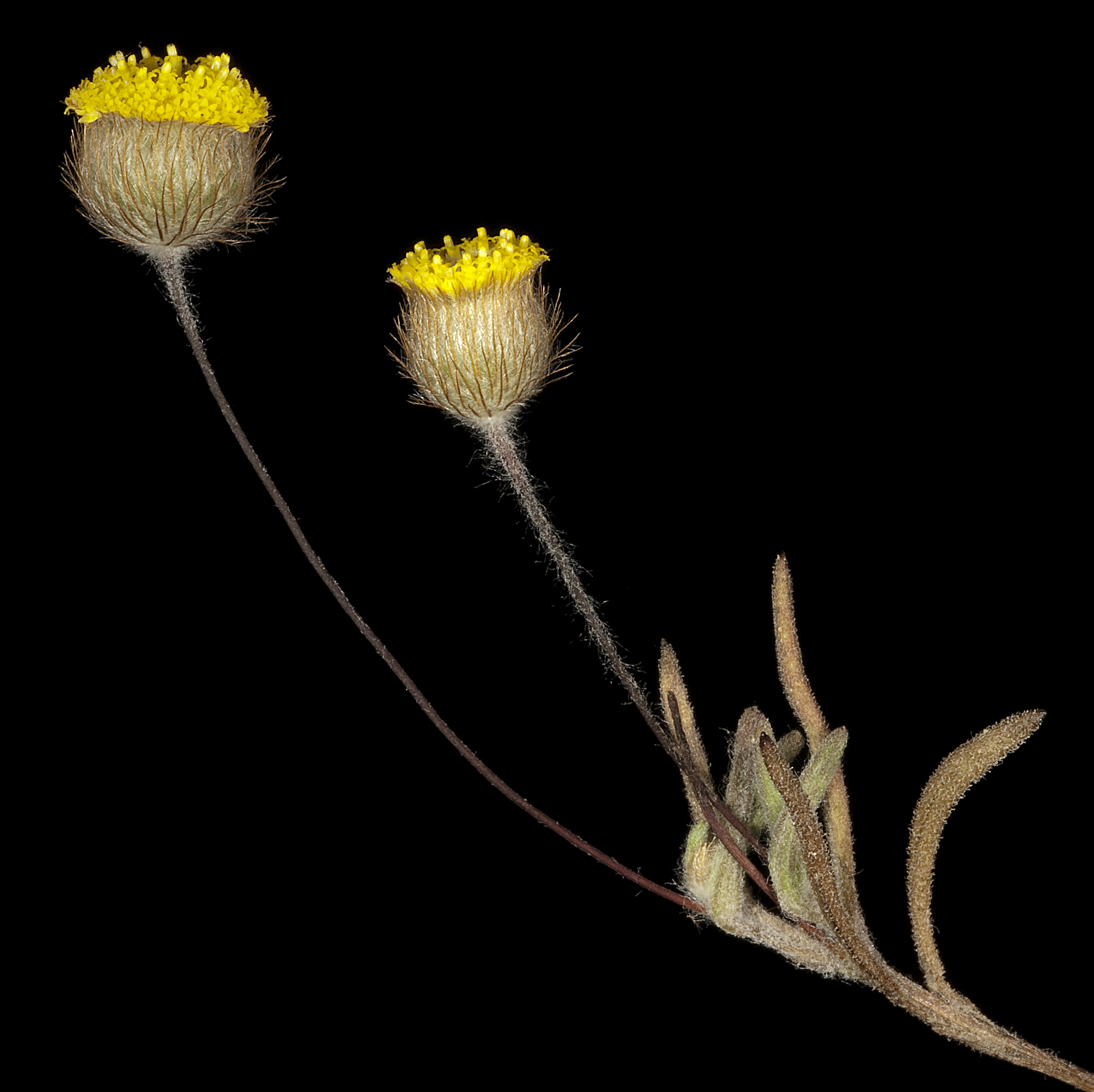
- Asteridea athrixioides

Scientific classification
- Kingdom: Plantae
- Clade: Tracheophytes
- Clade: Angiosperms
- Clade: Eudicots
- Clade: Asterids
- Order: Asterales
- Family: Asteraceae
- Genus: Asteridea
- Species: A. athrixioides

Binomial name
- Asteridea athrixioides (Sond. & F.Muell.) Kroner
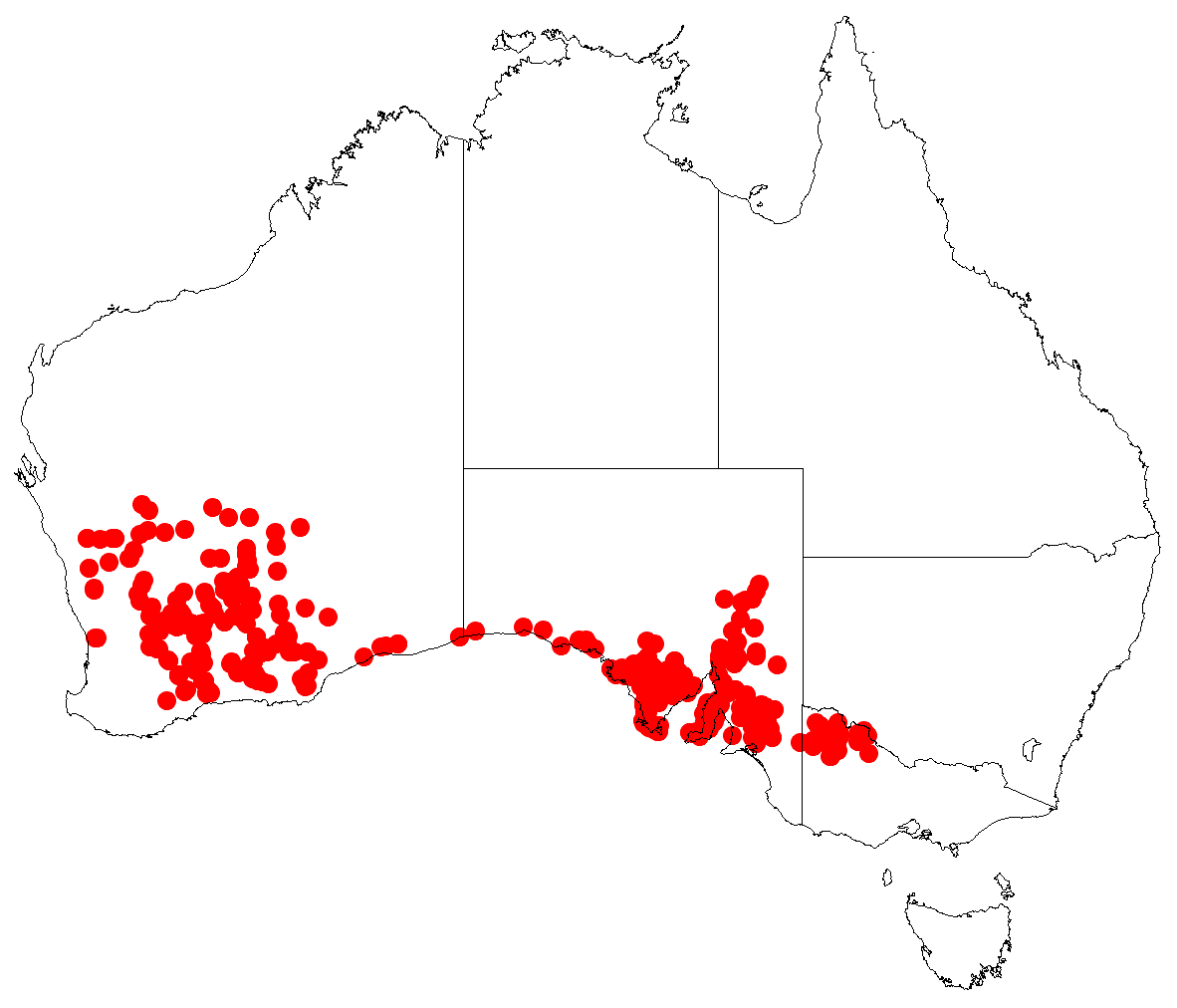
- Occurrence data from AVH

Synonyms
- Athrixia athrixioides Druce; Athrixia tenella Benth. Panaetia athrixioides Sond. & F.Muell.

= Asteridea athrixioides =

Species of flowering plant

Asteridea athrixioides is a herb in the Asteraceae family, which is endemic to Australia, and found in Western Australia, South Australia and Victoria. It was first described in 1853 by Otto Sonder and Ferdinand von Mueller as Panaetia athrixioides, who described it from specimen(s) collected in the Port Lincoln district. In 1980, G. Kroner assigned it to the genus, Asteridea, giving it the name Asteridea athrixioides. It is an annual herb, growing on calcareous, sandy or clay soils to heights of from 5 cm to 20 cm. Its yellow flowers may seen from July to November on saline on allvial flats, rocky hills and undulating plains.
