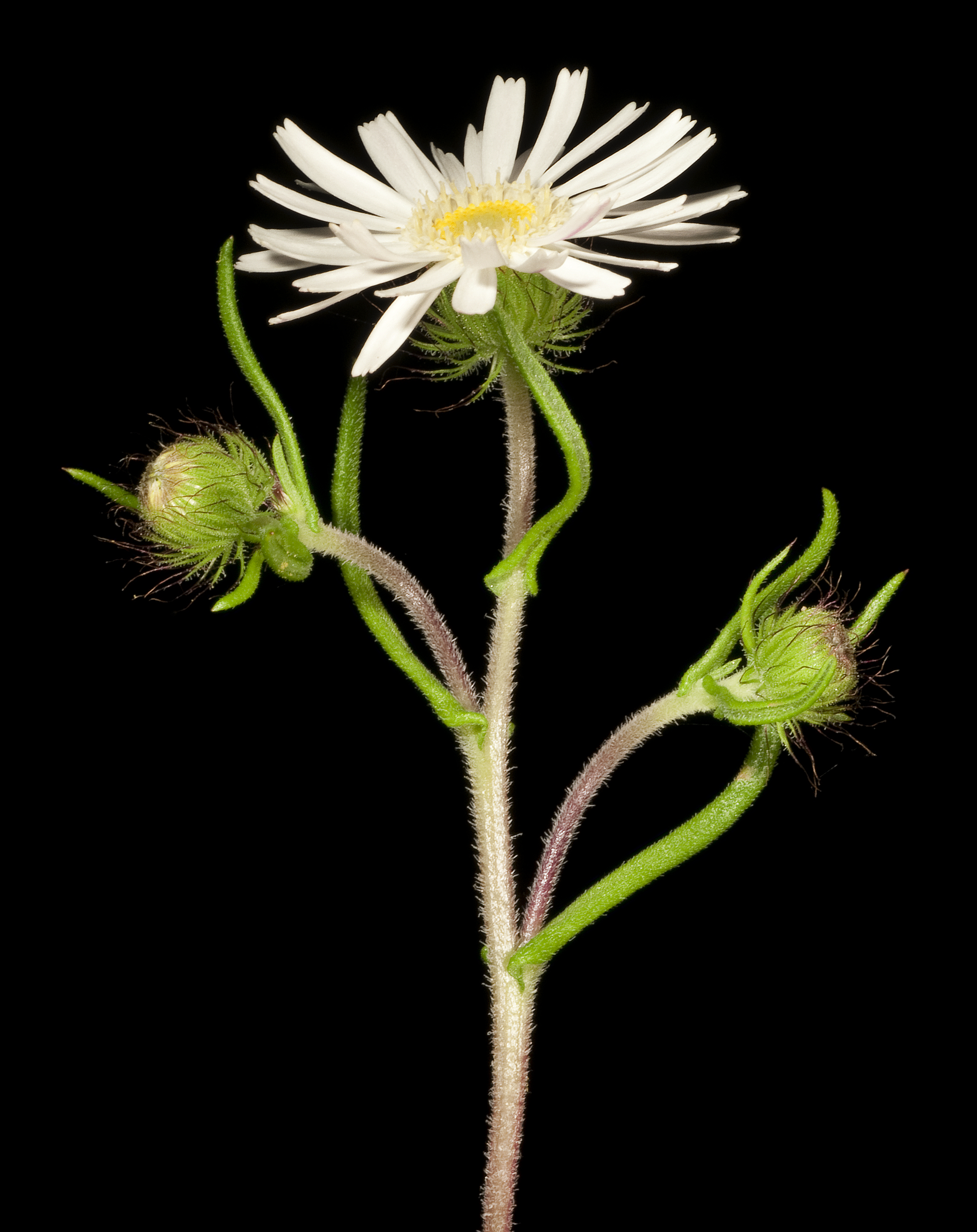

Scientific classification
- Kingdom: Plantae
- Clade: Tracheophytes
- Clade: Angiosperms
- Clade: Eudicots
- Clade: Asterids
- Order: Asterales
- Family: Asteraceae
- Genus: Asteridea
- Species: A. pulverulenta

Binomial name
- Asteridea pulverulenta Lindl.
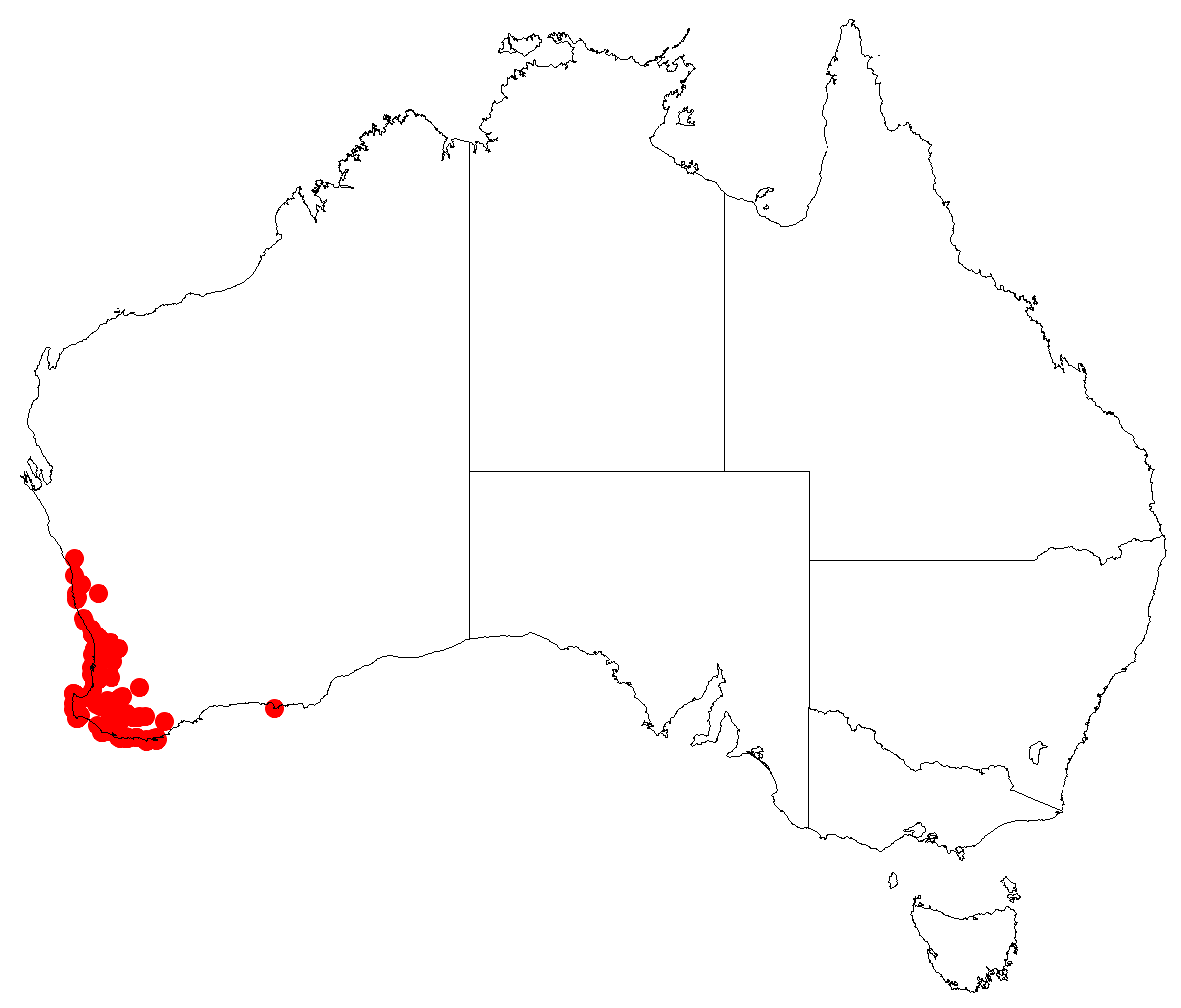
- Occurrence data from AVH

Synonyms
- Athrixia australis Steetz; Athrixia pulverulenta Druce

= Asteridea pulverulenta =

Species of flowering plant

Asteridea pulverulenta (common name - common bristle daisy) is a species of flowering plant in the Asteraceae family, which is endemic to Western Australia, in the south-west. It was first described in 1839 by John Lindley.

== Description ==
It is an annual herb, growing on sandy soils to heights of from 5 cm to 70 cm. Its white flowers may seen from October to January on coastal dunes and sandplains.

Lindley describes the plant as having a dusty indumentum ("undique pilis mollibus ramentaceis pulverulenta"), and uses the adjective, pulverulenta ("powdered, dusty"), as the epithet to describe this characteristic of the plant.
