= Asteridea croniniana =

Conservation status
- Priority One — Poorly Known Taxa (DEC)

Scientific classification
- Kingdom: Plantae
- Clade: Tracheophytes
- Clade: Angiosperms
- Clade: Eudicots
- Clade: Asterids
- Order: Asterales
- Family: Asteraceae
- Genus: Asteridea
- Species: A. croniniana

Binomial name
- Asteridea croniniana (F.Muell.) Kroner

Synonyms
- Athrixia croniniana F.Muell.

Species of flowering plant

Asteridea croniniana is a herb in the Asteraceae family, which is endemic to Western Australia. It is an annual herb, growing to a height of 8 cm.

== Etymology ==
It was first validly published in 1888 by Ferdinand von Mueller as Athrixia croniniana, but Mueller gave the first description slightly earlier in the Victorian Naturalist 5: 54, from a specimen found near the source of the Blackwood River by a Miss Cronin, from whom it derives its specific epithet, croniniana. In 1980, G. Kroner assigned it to the genus, Asteridea, giving it the name Asteridea croniniana.
