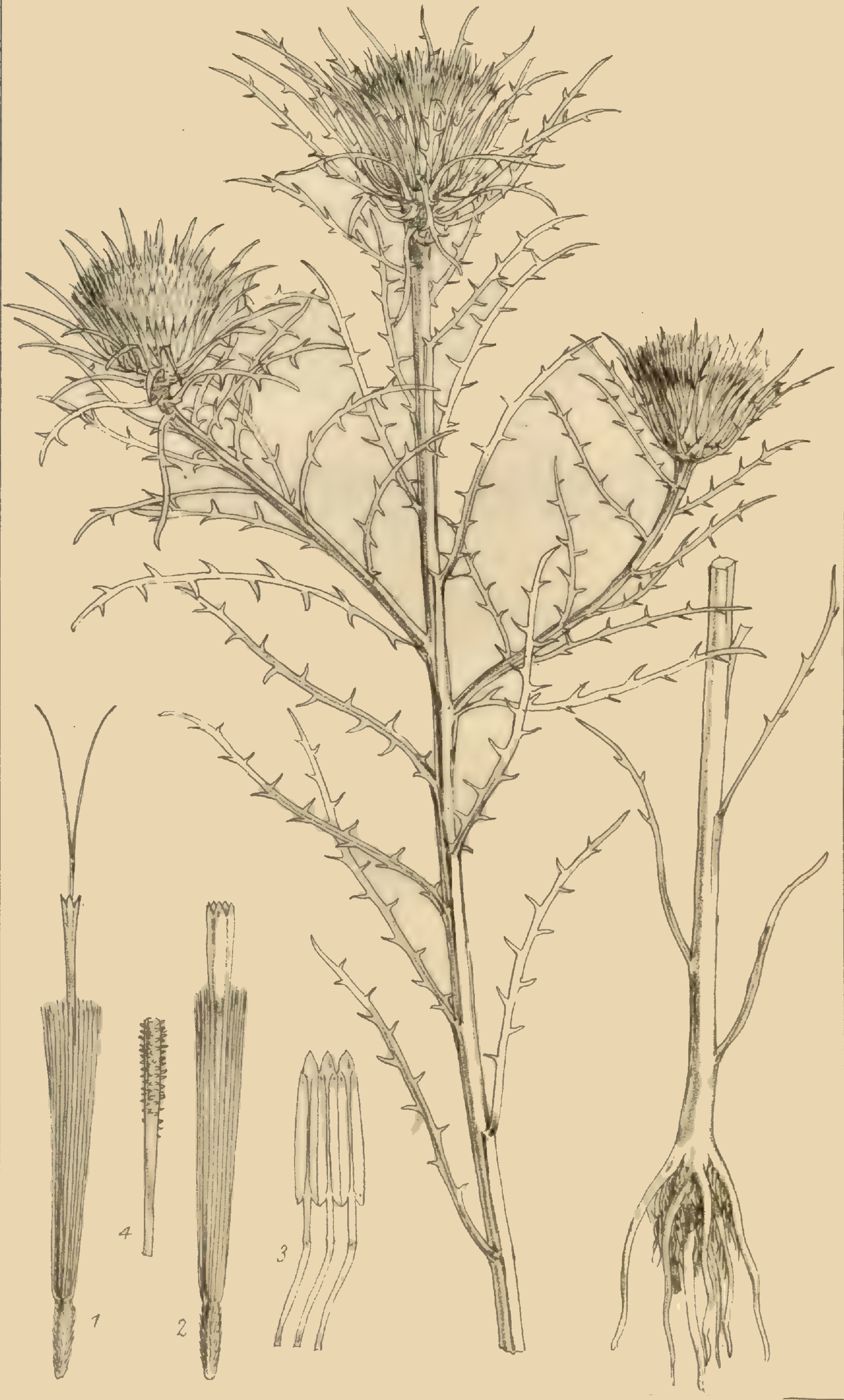
- Illustration accompanying the protologue of Adelostigma senegalensis

Scientific classification
- Kingdom: Plantae
- Clade: Tracheophytes
- Clade: Angiosperms
- Clade: Eudicots
- Clade: Asterids
- Order: Asterales
- Family: Asteraceae
- Subfamily: Asteroideae
- Tribe: Inuleae
- Genus: Adelostigma; Steetz

Type species
- Adelostigma athrixioides Steetz

Synonyms
- Cancellaria Sch.Bip. ex Oliv.

= Adelostigma =

Genus of flowering plants

Adelostigma is a genus of flowering plants in the daisy family described as a genus in 1864. It is native to Africa.

Species

- Adelostigma athrixioides Steetz - Mozambique
- Adelostigma senegalensis Benth. - Guinea, Guinea-Bissau, Mali, Senegal, Sierra Leone
