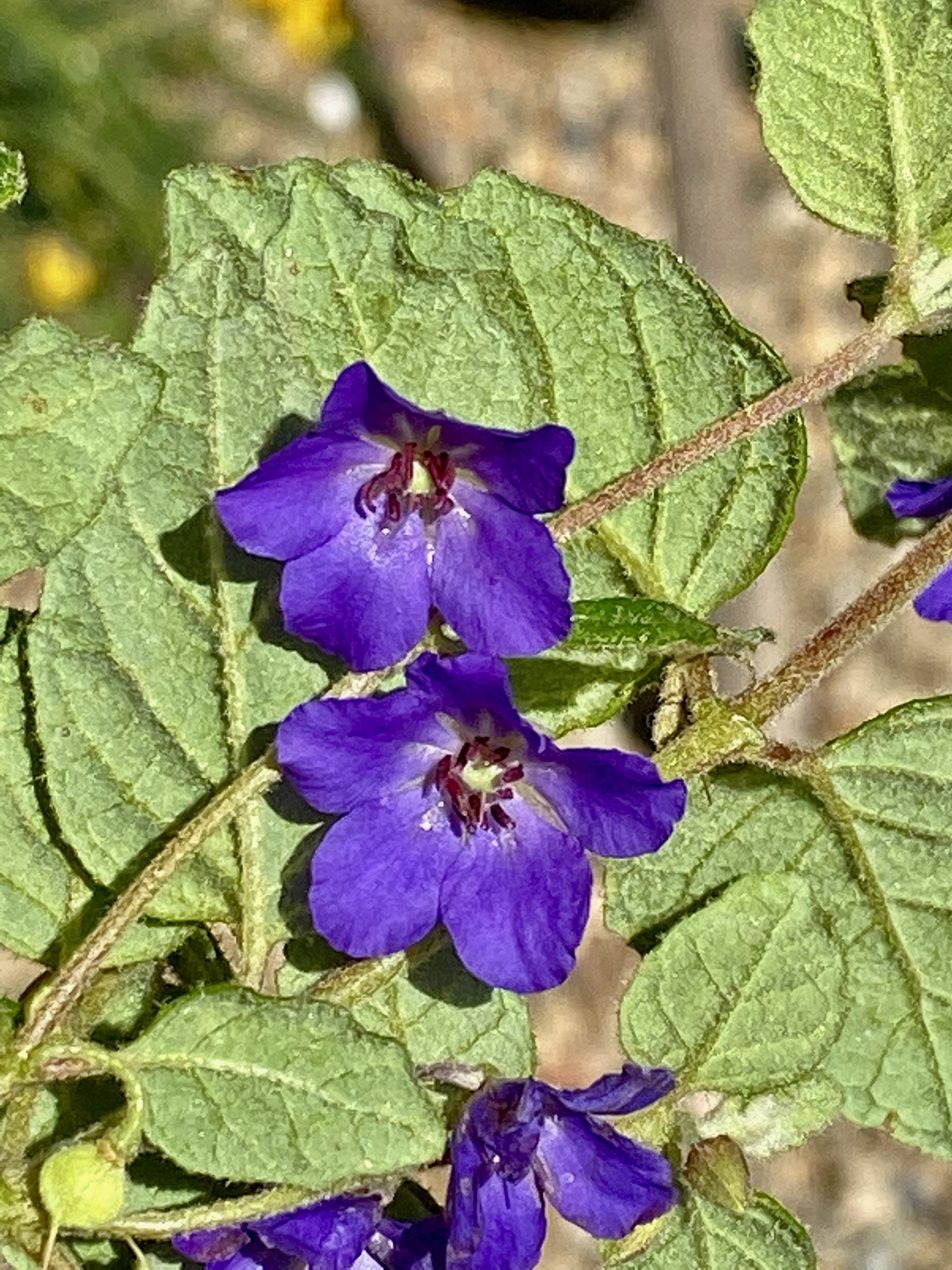

Scientific classification
- Kingdom: Plantae
- Clade: Tracheophytes
- Clade: Angiosperms
- Clade: Eudicots
- Clade: Rosids
- Order: Oxalidales
- Family: Elaeocarpaceae
- Genus: Tremandra
- Species: T. stelligera

Binomial name
- Tremandra stelligera R.Br ex DC.

= Tremandra stelligera =

Species of flowering plant

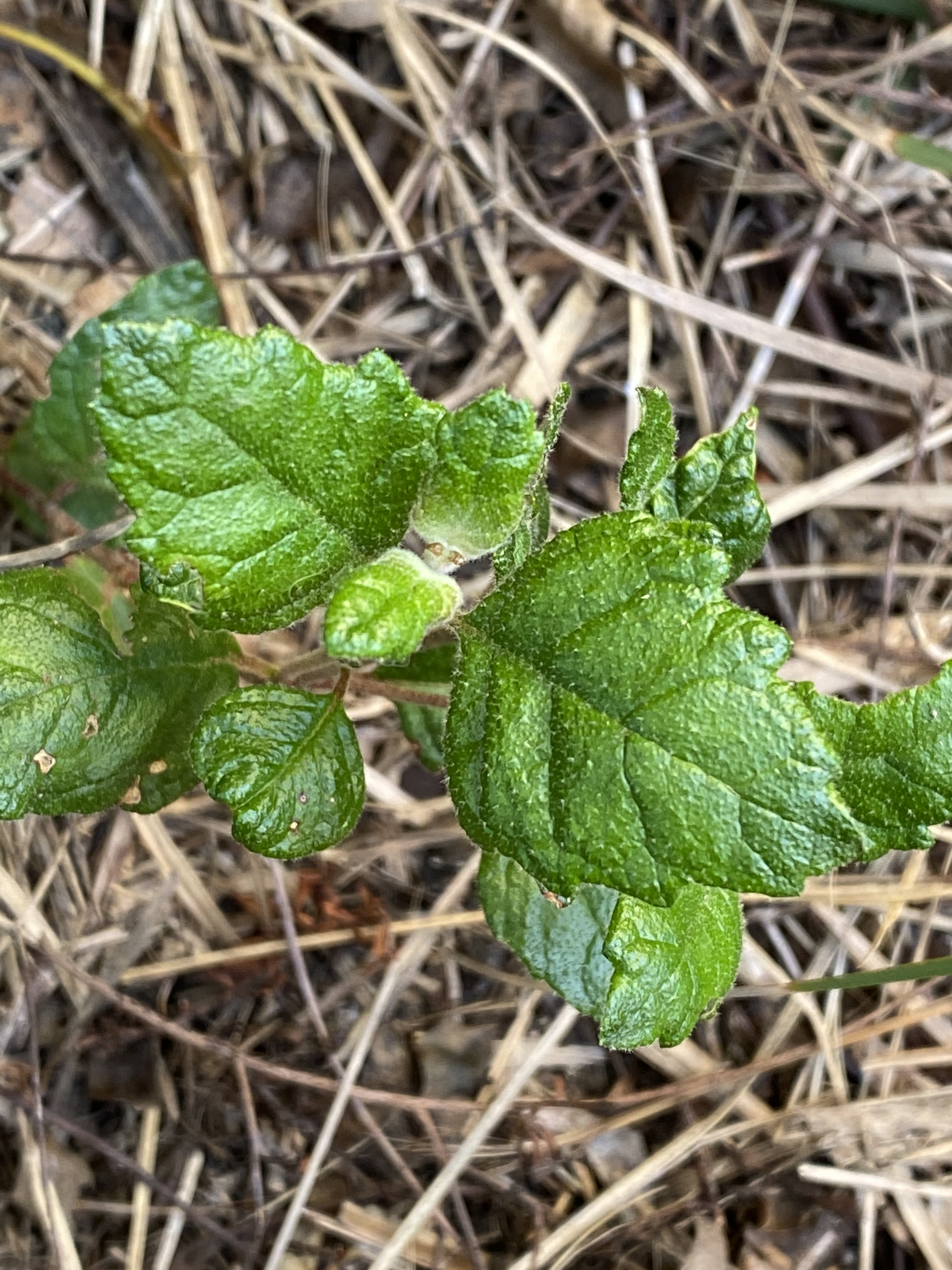
foliage

Tremandra stelligera is a flowering plant in the family Elaeocarpaceae. It is a small upright shrub with pink, purple or blue flowers, dark green oval shaped leaves and is endemic to Western Australia.

== Description ==
Tremandra stelligera is an upright, sprawling shrub up to 2 m (6 ft 7 in) high. It has dark green egg-shaped leaves to 5 cm (2.0 in) long, 4 cm (1.6 in) wide, hairs on upper and lower surface with sporadically toothed margins. The pink, blue or purple flowers may have either four or five petals 1.6 cm (0.63 in) wide on a hairy pedicel. Flowering occurs from January to May or July to December.

== Taxonomy and naming ==
Tremandra stelligera was first formally described in 1824 by Augustin Pyramus de Candolle from an unpublished description by Robert Brown and de Candolle's description was published in Prodromus Systematis Naturalis Regni Vegetabilis. The specific epithet (stelligera) is derived from the Latin stelliger for "star-bearing" and "starry", referring to the stellate hairs.

== Distribution and habitat ==
The species is found in the south-west corner of Western Australia in a variety of habitats on loam and sandy soils.
