= Asteridea morawana =

Conservation status
- Priority One — Poorly Known Taxa (DEC)

Scientific classification
- Kingdom: Plantae
- Clade: Tracheophytes
- Clade: Angiosperms
- Clade: Eudicots
- Clade: Asterids
- Order: Asterales
- Family: Asteraceae
- Genus: Asteridea
- Species: A. morawana

Binomial name
- Asteridea morawana P.S.Short
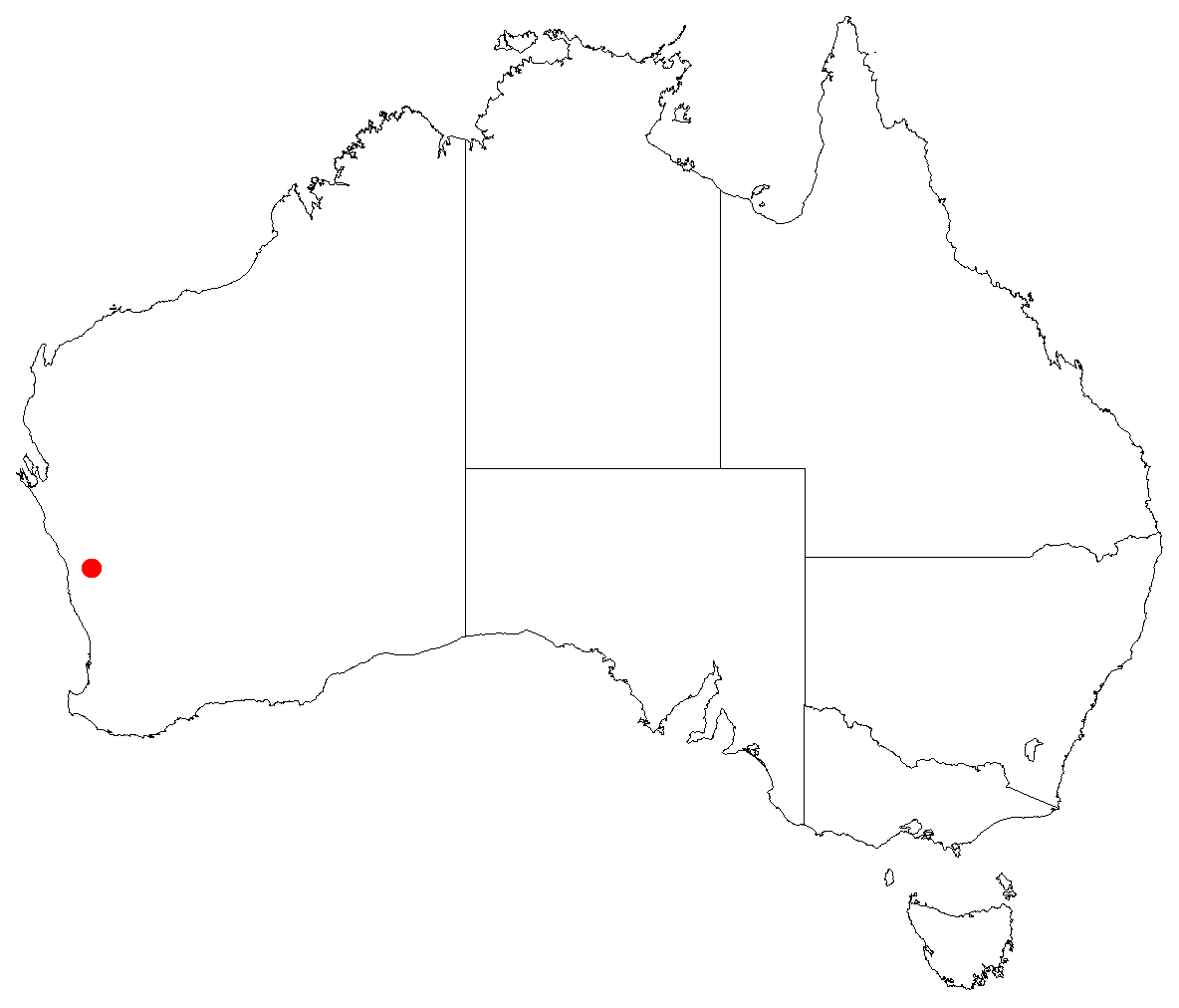
- Occurrence data from AVH

Species of flowering plant

Asteridea morawana is a herb in the Asteraceae family, which is endemic to Western Australia. It was first described in 2000 by Philip Short.

== Description ==
It is an erect, annual herb found growing on loam over limestone. Its yellow flowers may seen in November in the IBRA region of the Avon Wheatbelt. There are no synonyms.
