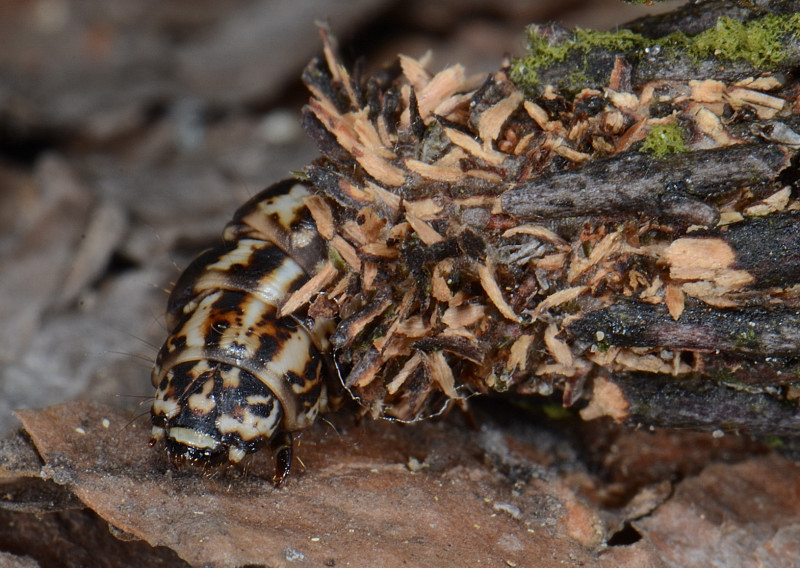
- Pachythelia villosella

Scientific classification
- Kingdom: Animalia
- Phylum: Arthropoda
- Clade: Pancrustacea
- Class: Insecta
- Order: Lepidoptera
- Family: Psychidae
- Subfamily: Oiketicinae
- Tribe: Acanthopsychini
- Genus: Pachythelia; Westwood, 1848

= Pachythelia =

Genus of moths

Pachythelia is a genus of moths in the family Psychidae.
