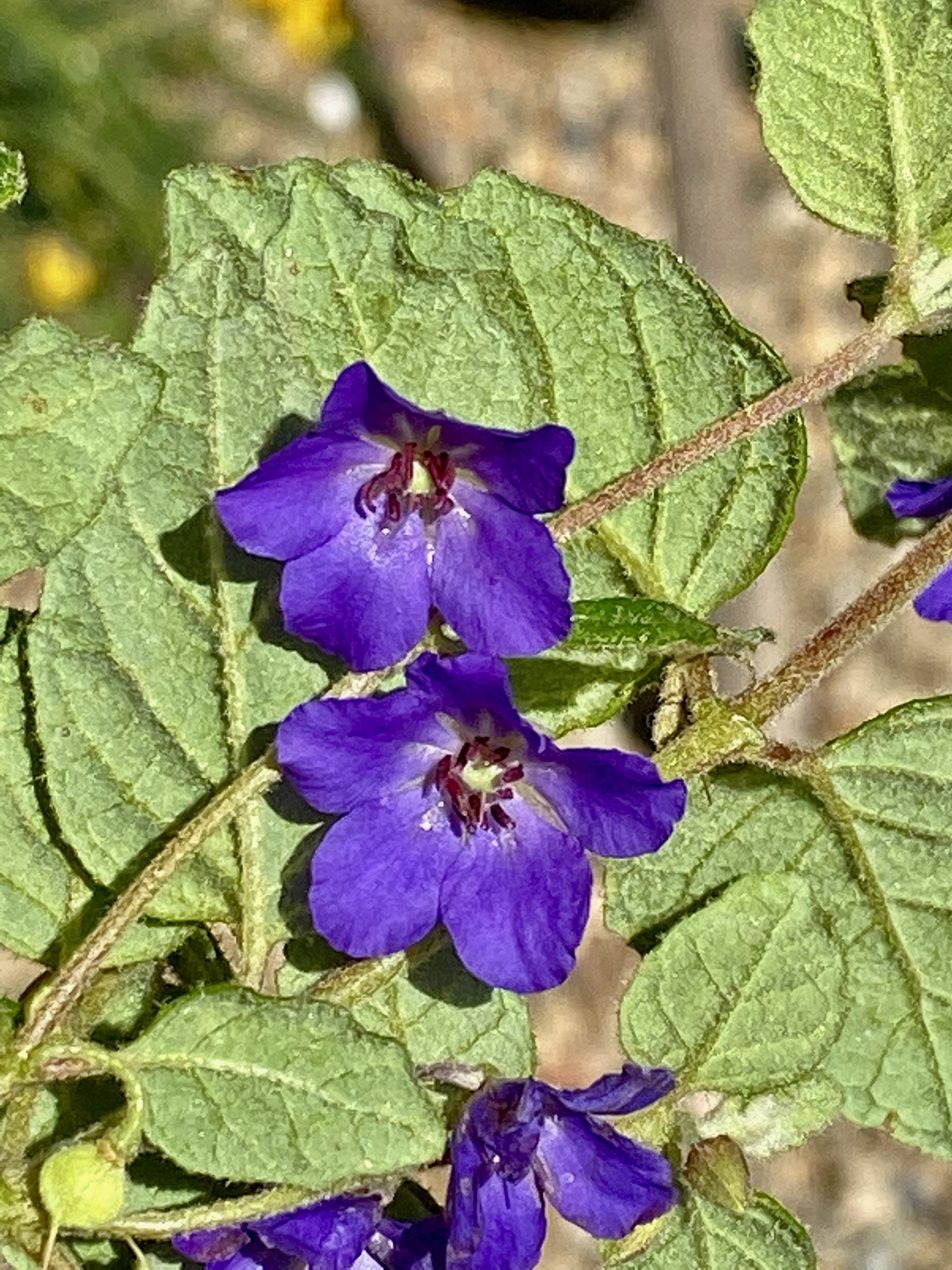
- Tremandra stelligera

Scientific classification
- Kingdom: Plantae
- Clade: Tracheophytes
- Clade: Angiosperms
- Clade: Eudicots
- Clade: Rosids
- Order: Oxalidales
- Family: Elaeocarpaceae
- Genus: Tremandra; R.Br ex DC.

Type species
- Tremandra stelligera

= Tremandra =

Genus of flowering plants

Tremandra is a genus of flowering plants in the family Elaeocarpaceae. It contains two species, both endemic to Western Australia.

== Description ==
Plants in the genus Tremandra are shrubs to 0.1–2 m (3.9 in – 6 ft 6.7 in) high with small to medium sized leaves arranged in opposite pairs and on a petiole. The leaves are simple, flat, heart or egg-shaped and may be rounded at the base. The mature leaves are smooth or covered with soft hairs on the upper surface, the underside covered in fine, soft hairs. The leaf margins are flat and scalloped. The single flowers are borne on a thread-like peduncle in leaf axils with 5 small to medium sized bracts. The sepals and petals are whorled around the centre floral receptacle. The fruit are a hairy capsule 2–7 mm (0.079–0.276 in) long containing 2 seeds that are dispersed at maturity.

== Taxonomy and naming ==
The genus Tremandra was first formally described in 1824 by Augustin Pyramus de Candolle from an unpublished description by Robert Brown and de Candolle's description was published in Prodromus Systematis Naturalis Regni Vegetabilis. The specific epithet (Tremandra) is derived from the Greek for "hole" and "anther", referring to the anthers bursting open through a hole.

== Species list ==
The following species names are accepted by the Australian Plant Census as at January 2020:

- Tremandra diffusa R.Br ex DC.;
- Tremandra stelligera R.Br ex DC..

== Distribution ==
Both species of Tremandra are found in the south-west of Western Australia.
