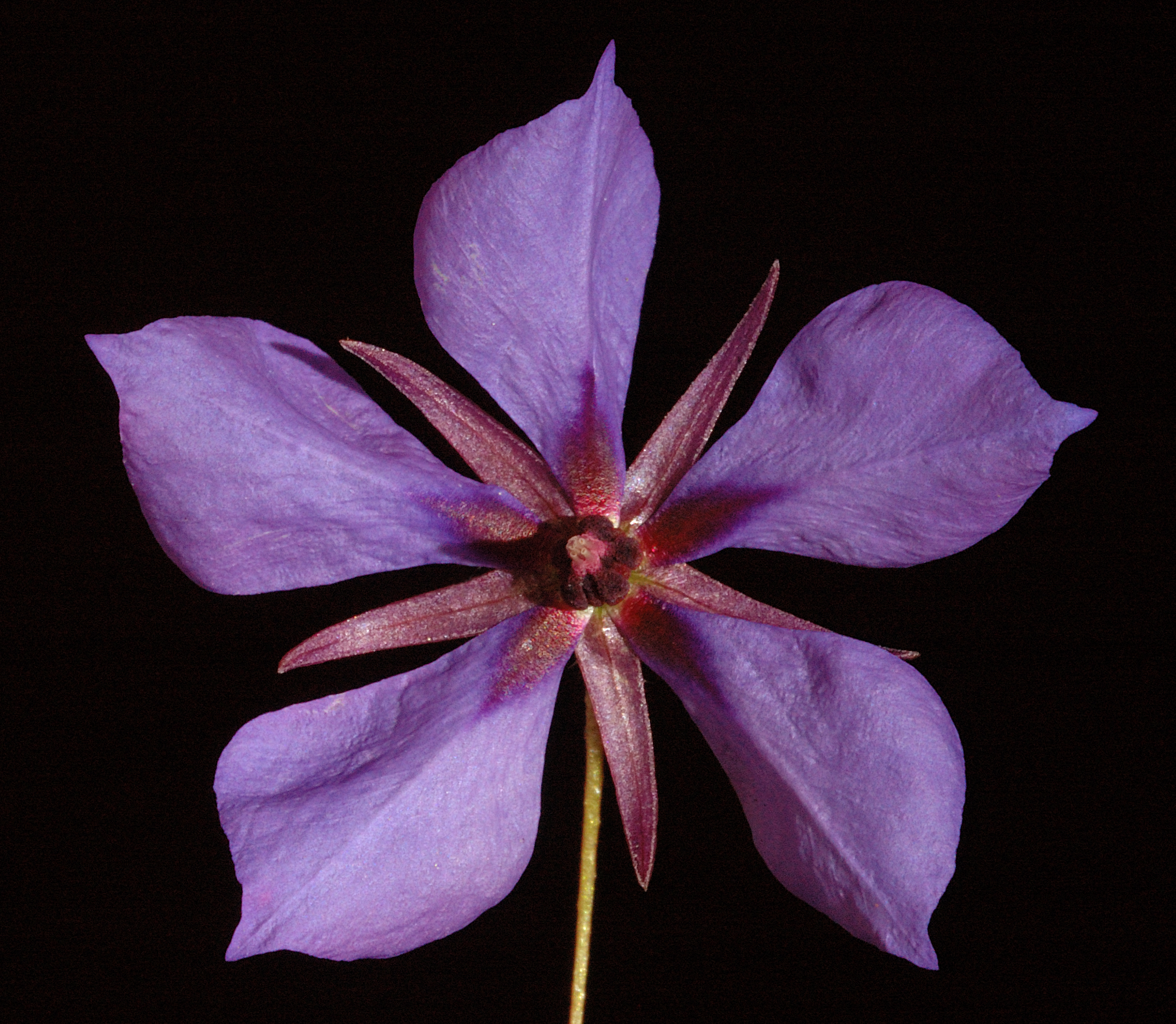
- Platytheca galioides

Scientific classification
- Kingdom: Plantae
- Clade: Tracheophytes
- Clade: Angiosperms
- Clade: Eudicots
- Clade: Rosids
- Order: Oxalidales
- Family: Elaeocarpaceae
- Genus: Platytheca; Steetz

Species
- See text

= Platytheca =

Family of shrubs

Platytheca is a genus of small shrubs in the family Elaeocarpaceae from the south-west of Western Australia. The genus was formally described by Joachim Steetz, his description published in Plantae Preissianae in 1845.

Species include:

- Platytheca anasima R.Butcher
- Platytheca galioides Steetz
- Platytheca juniperina Domin
- Platytheca sp. Sabina (G.J. & B.J. Keighery)
