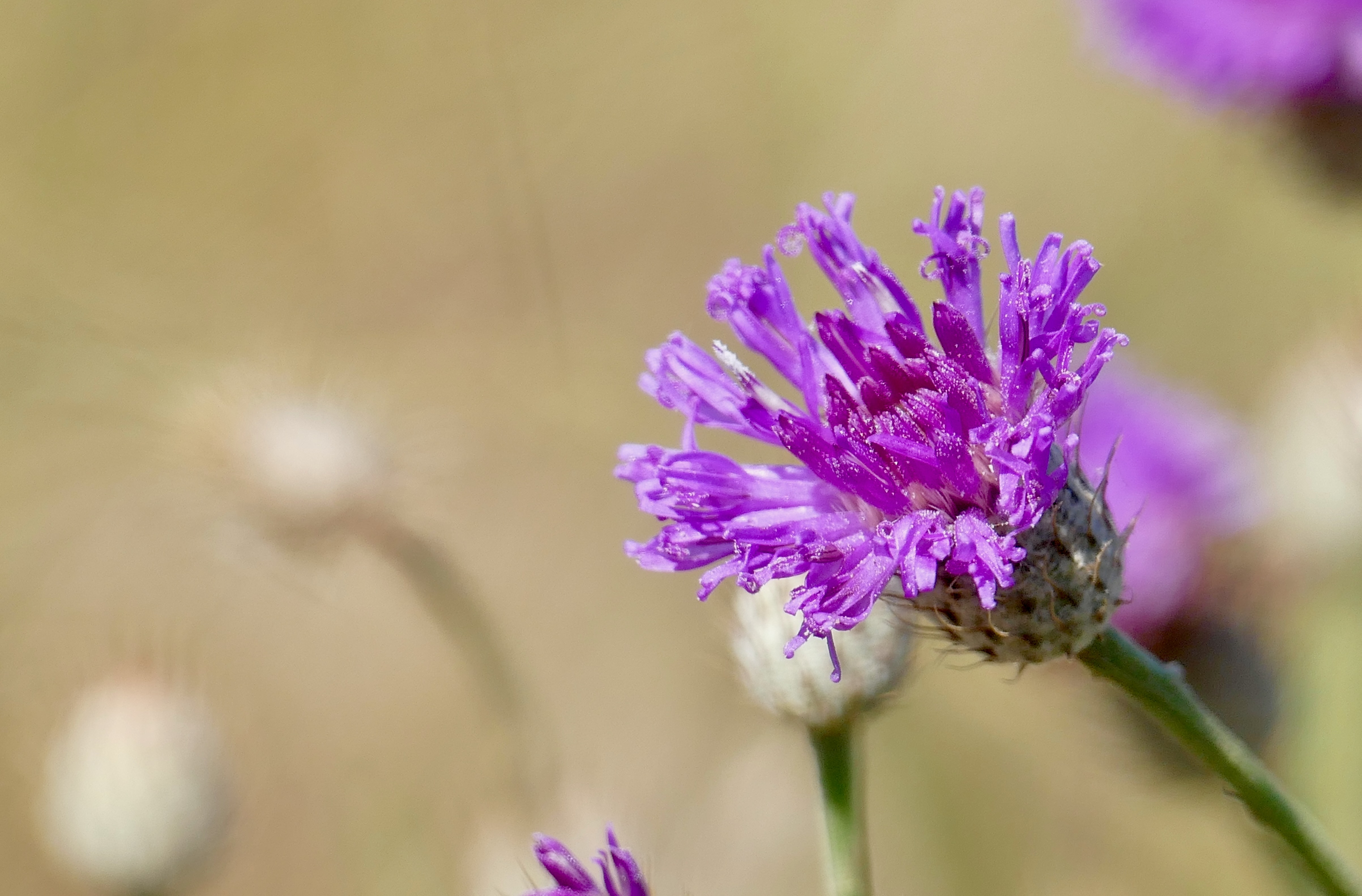
- Crystallopollen angustifolium

Scientific classification
- Kingdom: Plantae
- Clade: Embryophytes
- Clade: Tracheophytes
- Clade: Spermatophytes
- Clade: Angiosperms
- Clade: Eudicots
- Clade: Asterids
- Order: Asterales
- Family: Asteraceae
- Genus: Crystallopollen; Steetz

= Crystallopollen =

Genus of flowering plants

Crystallopollen is a genus of flowering plants belonging to the family Asteraceae.

Its native range is Tropical and Southern Africa.

Species:

- Crystallopollen angustifolium Steetz
- Crystallopollen bainesii (Oliv. & Hiern) J.C.Manning
- Crystallopollen chloropappum (Baker) J.C.Manning
- Crystallopollen jelfiae (S.Moore) J.C.Manning
- Crystallopollen mbalense (G.V.Pope) J.C.Manning
- Crystallopollen rhodesianum (S.Moore) J.C.Manning
- Crystallopollen serratuloides (DC.) J.C.Manning
- Crystallopollen sylvicola (G.V.Pope) J.C.Manning
