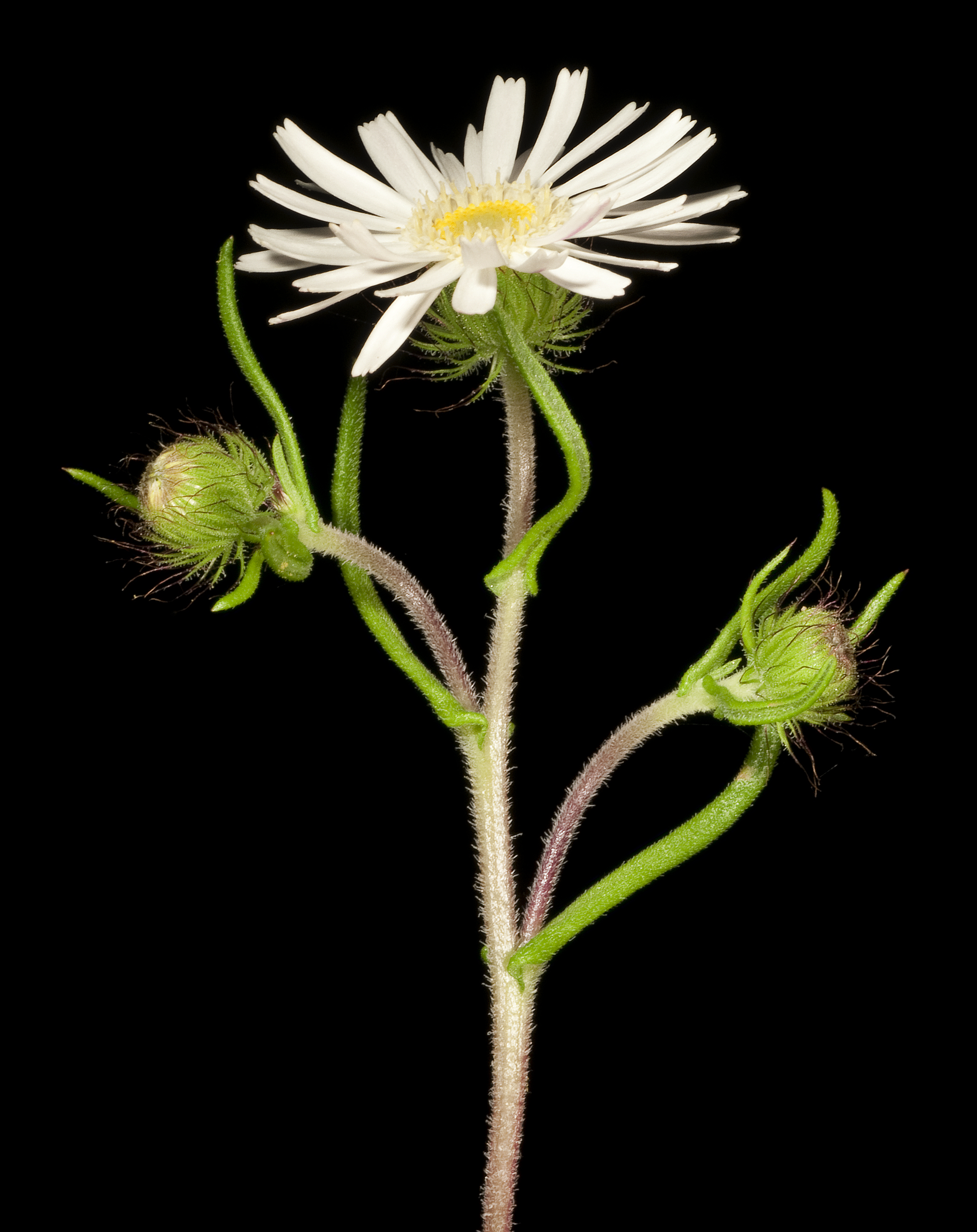
- Asteridea pulverulenta

Scientific classification
- Kingdom: Plantae
- Clade: Tracheophytes
- Clade: Angiosperms
- Clade: Eudicots
- Clade: Asterids
- Order: Asterales
- Family: Asteraceae
- Subfamily: Asteroideae
- Tribe: Gnaphalieae
- Genus: Asteridea; Lindl. (1839)

Type species
- Asteridea pulverulenta Lindl.

Synonyms
- Chrysodiscus Steetz (1845); Trichostegia Turcz. (1851)

= Asteridea (plant) =

Genus of flowering plants

Asteridea is a genus of flowering plants in the family Asteraceae. Evidence suggests that the genus, Asteridea, is monophyletic.

== Species ==
Accepted species. all of which are endemic to Australia, and found in Western Australia, South Australia, and Victoria.

- Asteridea archeri P.S.Short
- Asteridea asteroides (Turcz.) Kroner
- Asteridea athrixioides (Sond. & F.Muell.) Kroner
- Asteridea chaetopoda (F.Muell.) Kroner
- Asteridea croniniana (F.Muell.) Kroner
- Asteridea morawana P.S.Short
- Asteridea nivea (Steetz) Kroner
- Asteridea pulverulenta Lindl.

Plants of the World Online also lists Asteridea gracilis as accepted, but neither FloraBase nor CHAH accept this species.
