= Joachim Steetz =

English naturalist and botanist (1804–1862)

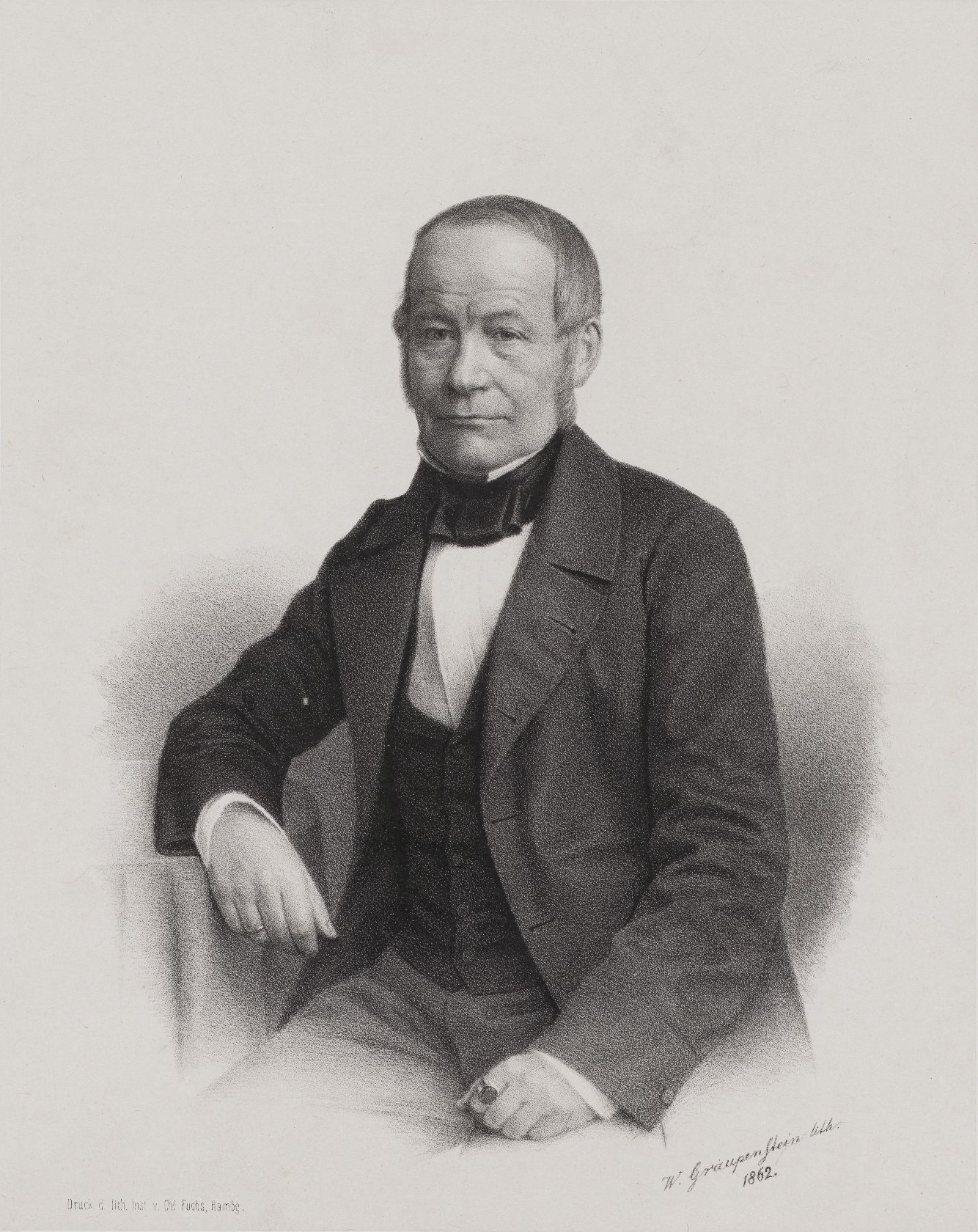
- Steetz in 1862
- Born: 12 November 1804; Hamburg, Germany
- Died: 24 March 1862 (aged 57)
- Spouse: m. Johanne Henriette Moller 23 July 1842
- Scientific career
- Fields: Medical doctor, botanist, zoologist
- Author abbrev. (botany): Steetz

Joachim Steetz (12 November 1804 – 24 March 1862) was a German botanist. His herbarium, comprising more than 5000 specimens from over 160 collectors and 30 countries was purchased in 1863 by Victorian Government Botanist Ferdinand von Mueller for the sum of 80 pounds. The collection is currently housed at the National Herbarium of Victoria. The herbarium was compiled by Steetz over more than thirty years and comprises 160 collectors from more than 30 countries, including type specimens from plant collectors of the time including:

- Nils Johan Andersson (Galápagos Islands)
- Nikolaus Binder
- Christian Friedrich Ecklon (South Africa)
- Joseph Dalton Hooker
- Johann Wilhelm Karl Moritz
- Wilhelm Peters
- Ludwig Preiss (Western Australia)
- Anton Rochel (The Banat)
- Moritz Richard Schomburgk
- Berthold Carl Seemann
- Charles Wilkins Short (North America)
- Franz Sieber
- Theodor Siemssen
- Andrew Sinclair
- Thomas Thomson
- Nikolai Turczaninow (Russia)
- Jens Vahl (Arctic)
- Karl Ludwig Philipp Zeyher (South Africa)

== Standard author abbreviation ==
The standard author abbreviation Steetz is used to indicate this person as the author when citing a botanical name.

== Selected publications ==
- 1847: "Revisio generis Comesperma Labill. et synopsis Lasiopetalearum et Biittneriearum in Nova Hollandia indigenarum." (Hamburg). [Preprint of Lehmann op. cit. 2: 291–315, 316–317 (?- 367, including Fleischeria) (2–5 Aug. 1848) n.v., see Stafleu & Cowan 1985.]
- 1848: "Nekrolog. Entomol. Zeitung" 9(7): 194–198. – Obituary of Wilhelm von Winthem (1799–1847).
- 1853. "Die Familie der Tremandreen und ihre Verwandtschaft zu der Familie der Lasiopetaleen." (Hamburg). [Sept.-Oct. 1853.]
- 1854: "Tremandreae". In Lehmann, J.G.C. (ed.), "Plantae Preissianae" (Hamburg). 1: 211–223. [9–11 Feb. 1845.]
- 1854: "Compositae". In Lehmann op. cit. 1: 417–490. [pp. 417–480, 14–16 Aug.; pp. 481–490, 3–5 Nov.]
- 1854: "Compositae". In Seemann, B. (ed.), " The botany of the voyage of H.M.S. Herald" (Lovell Reeve: London), pp. 139–160. [Feb. 1854; part of the " Flora of the Isthmus of Panama".]
- 1854: "Ein deutsches Urtheil über eine englische Kritik". Bonplandia 2(14): 169–170. [15 July 1854.]
- 1854: "Trigonopterum" Steetz in Andersson, Kongl. Vetensk. Acad. Handl. 1853: 183 (1854). [c. 7 Sept. 1854.]
- 1854: "Dr Steetz fiber den Begriff von Species". Bonplandia 2(21): 244–246. [1 Nov. 1854.]
- 1854: "Zuriickweisung, Dem Redacteur der ‘Bonplandia’". Bonplandia 2(21): 246–247. [1 Nov. 1854.]
- 1855: Fried. E. L. von Fischer. Bonplandia: 3(2): 18–21. [1 Feb. 1855.] – Obituary of F.E.L. von Fischer (1782–1854).
- 1855: "Gardeners’ Chronicle’s ‘Bad German habit’". Dem Redacteur der Bonplandia. Bonplandia 3(11): 147–155. [15 June 1855.]
- 1855: "Replik. Dem Redacteur der Bonplandia". Bonplandia 3(13&14): 203–205. [15 July 1855.]
- 1856: "Klotzsch’s Angreifer. Dem Redacteur der Bonplandia". Bonplandia 4(17): 280–281. [1 Sept. 1856.]
- 1857: "Klotzsch’s Begoniaceen. Dem Redacteur der Bonplandia". Bonplandia 5(4): 60–65. [1 March 1857.]
- 1857: "Compositae". In Seemann, B. op. cit. pp. 384–395. [Jan.-Jun. 1857; part of the " Flora of the Island of Hongkong".]
- 1857: "Duhaldea Chinensis, De Cand. Ein Beitrag zur Systematik der Compositae". Bonplandia 5(19): 305–310. [1 Nov. 1857.]
- 1858: "Elvira biflora, DC. und Unxia digyna, Steetz. Dem Redacteur der Bonplandia". Bonplandia 6: 128- 131. [15 April 1858.]
- 1863: "Streptoglossa Steetz in F. Muell", Trans. Bot. Soc. Edinburgh 7: 492–495.
- 1864: "Compositae". In Peters, W. C. H. (ed.), "Naturwissenschaftliche Reise nach Mossambique" (Berlin). 6: 305–500.

== Named by Steetz ==
=== Genera ===
- Adelostigma Steetz
- Ambassa Steetz
- Anisolepis Steetz
- Chrysodiscus Steetz
- Chthonocephalus Steetz
- Crystallopollen Steetz
- Gongrothamnus Steetz
- Gymnogyne Steetz
- Gynaphanes Steetz
- Hyalosperma Steetz
- Hypericophyllum Steetz
- Lysistemma Steetz
- Menotriche Steetz
- Pachysurus Steetz
- Pachythelia Steetz
- Platytheca Steetz
- Pleiotaxis Steetz
- Pogonolepis Steetz
- Pterochaeta Steetz
- Punduana Steetz
- Rhynchostemon Steetz
- Schoenia Steetz
- Siemssenia Steetz
- Silphiosperma Steetz
- Streptoglossa Steetz ex F.Muell.
- Trigonopterum Steetz
- Tuberostylis Steetz
- Xipholepis Steetz

== Named in honor of Steetz ==
=== Genera ===
- Steetzia Lehm.
- Steetzia Sonder

=== Species ===
- Achyrocline steetzii Vatke
- Aster steetzii F. Muell.
- Baccharis steetzi Andersson
- Bothriocline steetziana Wild & Pope
- Eupatorium steetzii Robinson
- Helichrysum steetzii Tovey & Morris
- Nidorella steetzii J.A. Schmidt
- Senecio steetzii Bolle
- Sphaeranthus steetzii Oliver & Hiern
- Streptoglossa steetzii F. Muell.
- Vernonia steetziana Oliver & Hiern
- Waitzia steetziana Lehm.
