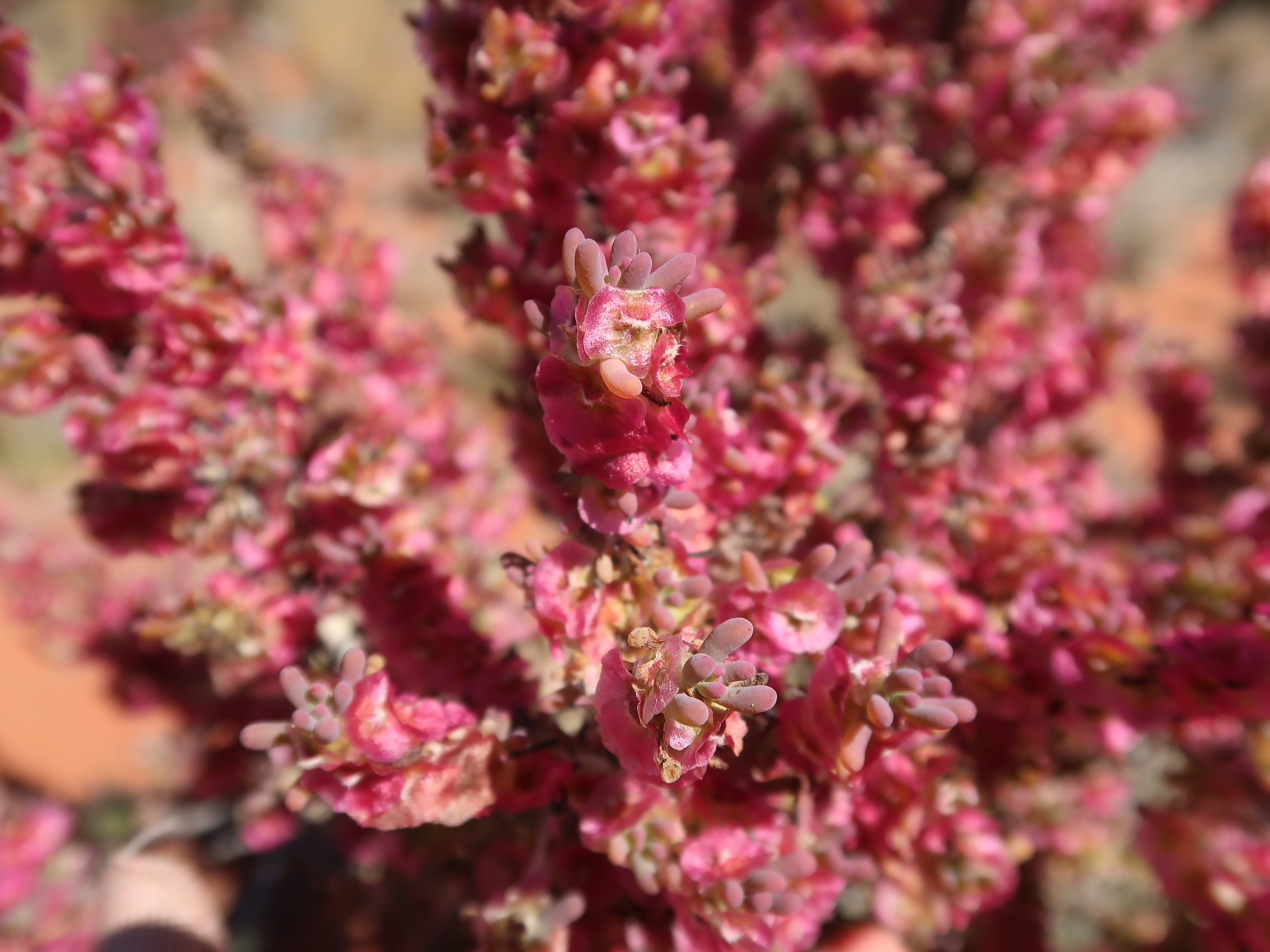

Scientific classification
- Kingdom: Plantae
- Clade: Tracheophytes
- Clade: Angiosperms
- Clade: Eudicots
- Order: Caryophyllales
- Family: Amaranthaceae
- Genus: Maireana
- Species: M. erioclada

Binomial name
- Maireana erioclada (Benth.) Paul G.Wilson
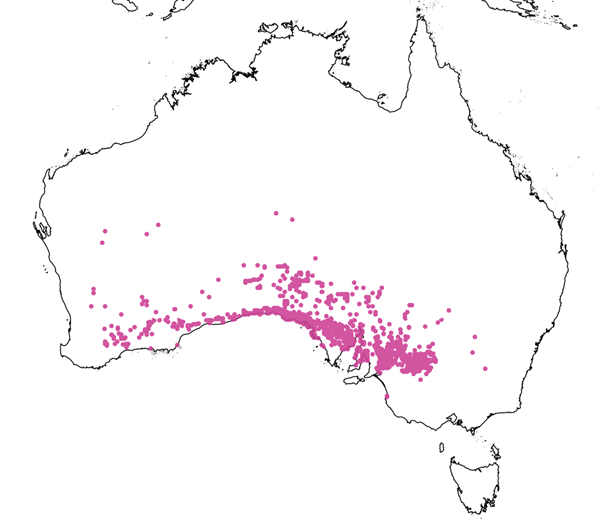
- Distribution map of M. erioclada, according to verified spatial information from the Living Atlas of Australia, October 2022

Synonyms
- Kochia erioclada (Benth.) Gauba; Kochia triptera var. erioclada Benth.

= Maireana erioclada =

Species of Australian plant

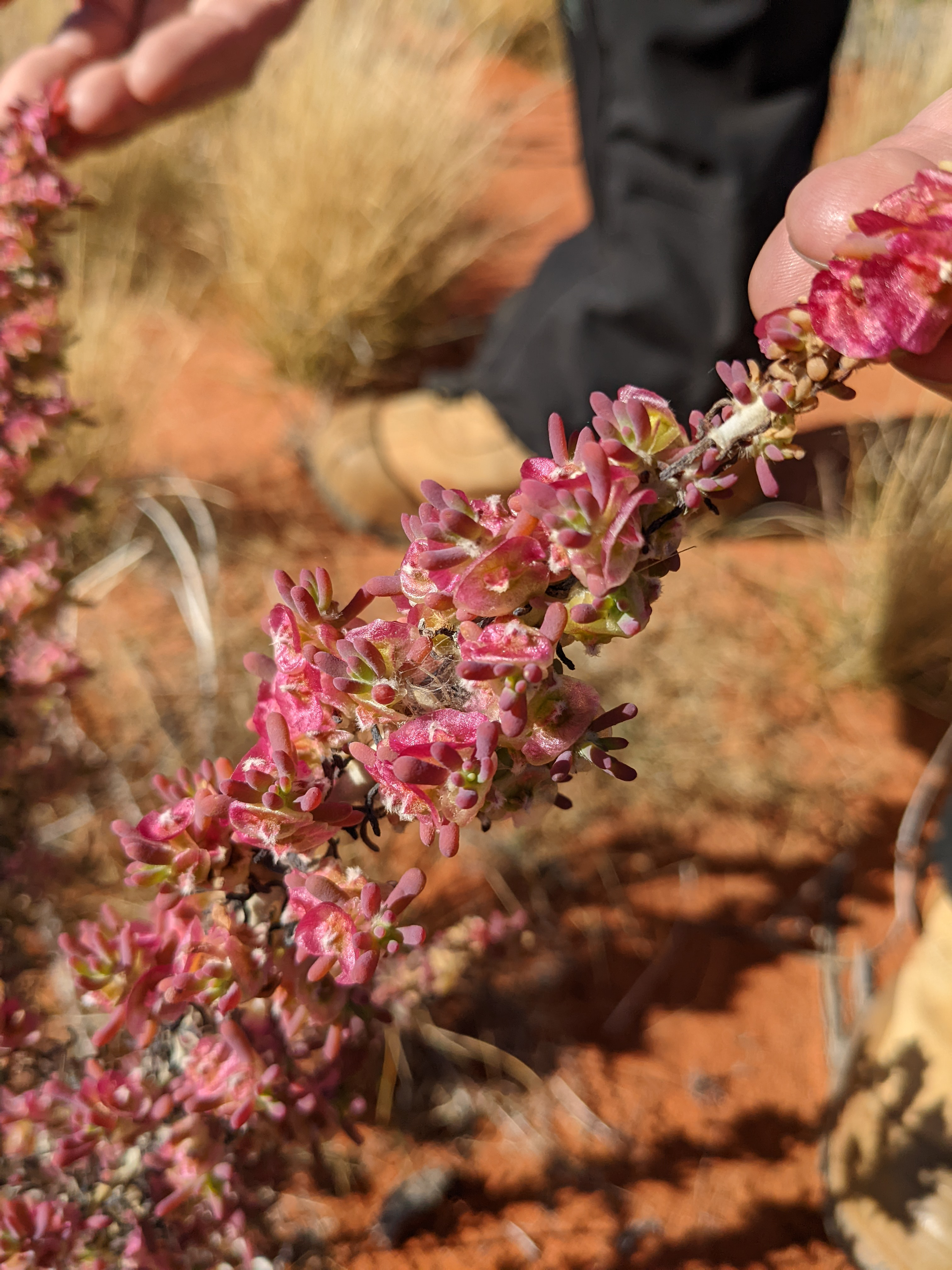
Habit at Roxby Downs Station

Maireana erioclada, commonly known as rosy bluebush or fleshy bluebush, is a species of flowering plant in the family Amaranthaceae and is endemic to southern continental Australia. It is a bushy, spreading, glaucous shrub with hairy branches, fleshy, club-shaped to narrowly egg-shaped leaves, bisexual flowers arranged singly, and a glabrous fruiting perianth with a narrowly funnel-shaped tube with horizontal wings.

== Description ==
Maireana erioclada is a perennial, bushy, glaucous shrub that typically grows to a height of up to 60 cm (24 in). Its leaves are narrowly oval with the narrower end towards the base to club-shaped, up to 10 mm (0.39 in) long, glabrous and with a rounded end. The flowers are bisexual, and arranged singly in leaf axils. The fruiting perianth is bright red or pink, maturing to dull brown, with a narrowly funnel-shaped tube with 5 vertical wings fused to a horizontal wing, 12 mm (0.47 in) in diameter. The fruiting perianths appear between August and November.

== Taxonomy ==
This species was first formally described in 1870 by English botanist George Bentham who gave it the name Kochia triptera var. erioclada in his Flora Australiensis. Bentham's description was based on two collections: one from Western Australia, chosen in 1848 by Erwin Gauba in 1948 as the lectotype and one collected in the "Murray desert" by Ferdinand von Mueller. In 1975, Paul Wilson raised the variety to species status as Maireana erioclada in the journal Nuytsia.

This species is similar to Maireana pentatropis, but has five wings joined to the tube throughout its length, but some specimens suggest possibly hybridisation between the two species

== Distribution and habitat ==
Maireana erioclada is native to Western Australia, South Australia, New South Wales and Victoria where it grows on red-brown soils and on sandy loams on flat ground or in saline depressions. In Victoria, the species occurs in the far north-west of the state in mallee communities, extends to the edges of salt pans. The species is noted to invade disturbed areas along roadsides.
