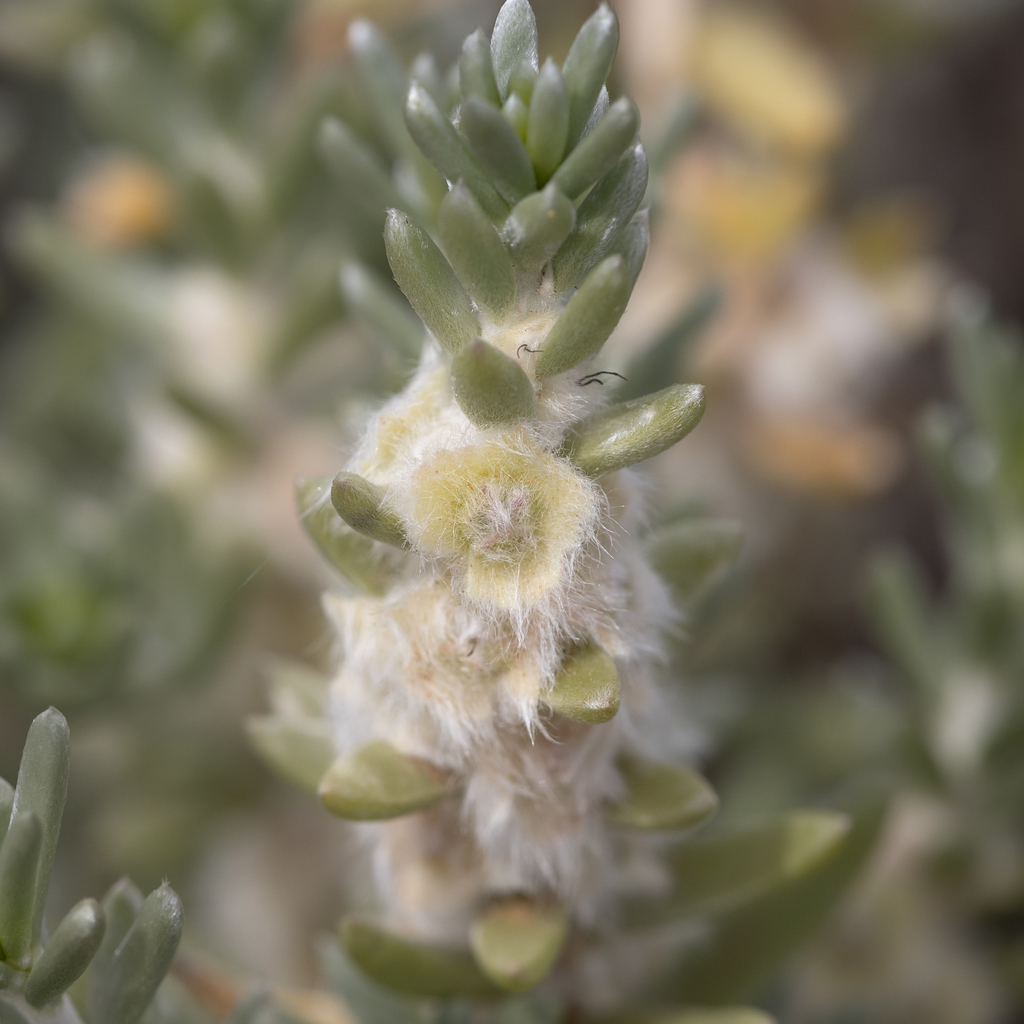

Scientific classification
- Kingdom: Plantae
- Clade: Tracheophytes
- Clade: Angiosperms
- Clade: Eudicots
- Order: Caryophyllales
- Family: Amaranthaceae
- Genus: Maireana
- Species: M. eriantha

Binomial name
- Maireana eriantha (F.Muell.) Paul G.Wilson

Synonyms
- Kochia concava Ising; Kochia eriantha F.Muell.; Kochia villosa var. eriantha (F.Muell.) C.Moore

= Maireana eriantha =

Species of plant

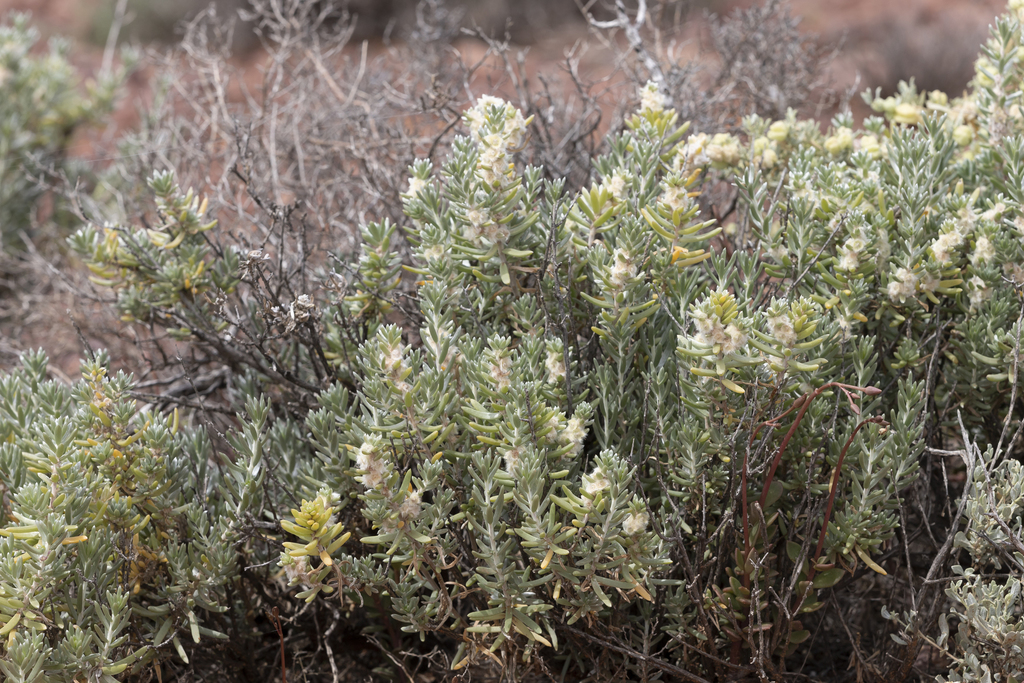
Habit near Lake Dutton

Maireana eriantha, commonly known as woolly bluebush, is a species of flowering plant in the family Amaranthaceae and is endemic to Australia. It is a mainly a dioecious shrub with hairy branches, fleshy, very narrowly oblong leaves, flowers arranged singly or in pairs, and a silky-woolly fruiting perianth with a thin-walled tube with leathery wings.

== Description ==
Maireana eriantha is an erect, dioecious shrub that grows to a height of up to 50 cm (20 in), its branches covered with woolly hairs. Its leaves are fleshy, very narrowly oblong, three-sided in cross-section, 10–30 mm (0.39–1.18 in) long, 1.5–3 mm (0.059–0.118 in) wide and densely covered with silky hairs. The flowers are arranged singly or in pairs in leaf axils. The fruiting perianth is silky-woolly, forming a soft ball about 10 mm (0.39 in) in diameter, the tube broadly top-shaped to cup-shaped, about 3 mm (0.12 in) high, with leathery wings divided into 5 lobes.

== Taxonomy ==
This species was first described in 1859 by Ferdinand von Mueller who gave it the name Kochia eriantha in the Votes and Proceedings of the Legislative Assembly of the Victorian Government. In 1975, Paul G. Wilson transferred the species to Maireana as M. eriantha in the journal Nuytsia. The specific epithet (eriantha) means 'wool-flowered'.

== Distribution and habitat ==
Woolly bluebush mainly grows on rocky hills and plains and is common north of Port Augusta in South Australia and in adjacent areas of Queensland, the Northern Territory and New South Wales.

== Conservation status ==
Maireana eriantha is listed as "near threatened" under the Northern Territory Government Territory Parks and Wildlife Conservation Act but as of "least concern" under the Queensland Government Nature Conservation Act 1992.
