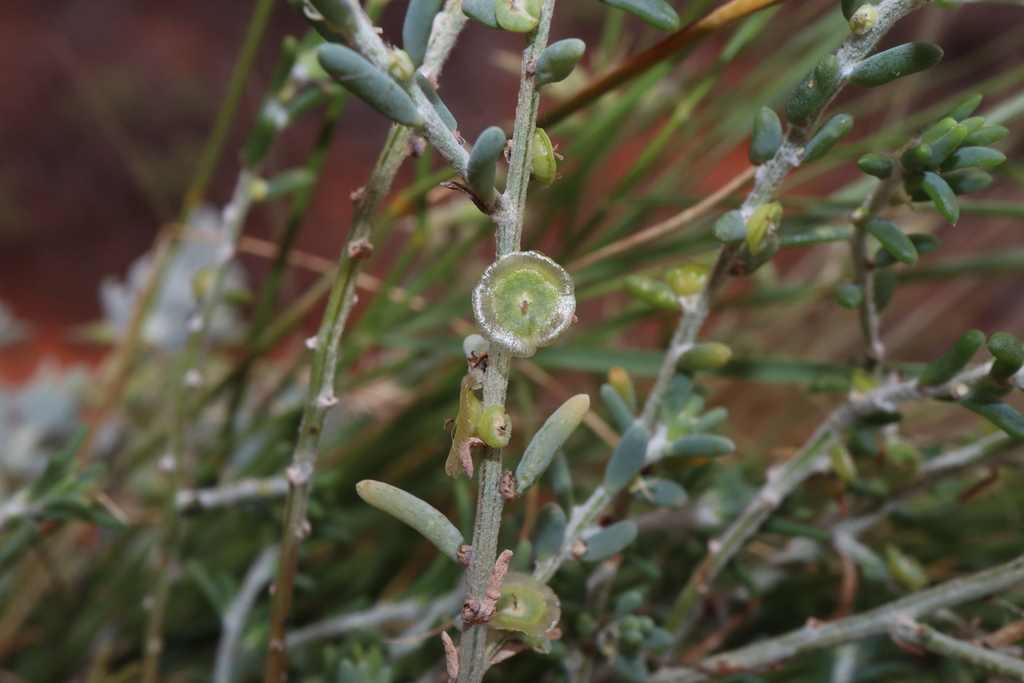

Scientific classification
- Kingdom: Plantae
- Clade: Tracheophytes
- Clade: Angiosperms
- Clade: Eudicots
- Order: Caryophyllales
- Family: Amaranthaceae
- Genus: Maireana
- Species: M. microcarpa

Binomial name
- Maireana microcarpa (Benth.) Paul G.Wilson

Synonyms
- Kochia microcarpa (Benth.) Paul G.Wilson; Kochia villosa var. microcarpa Benth.

= Maireana microcarpa =

Species of plant in the amaranth family

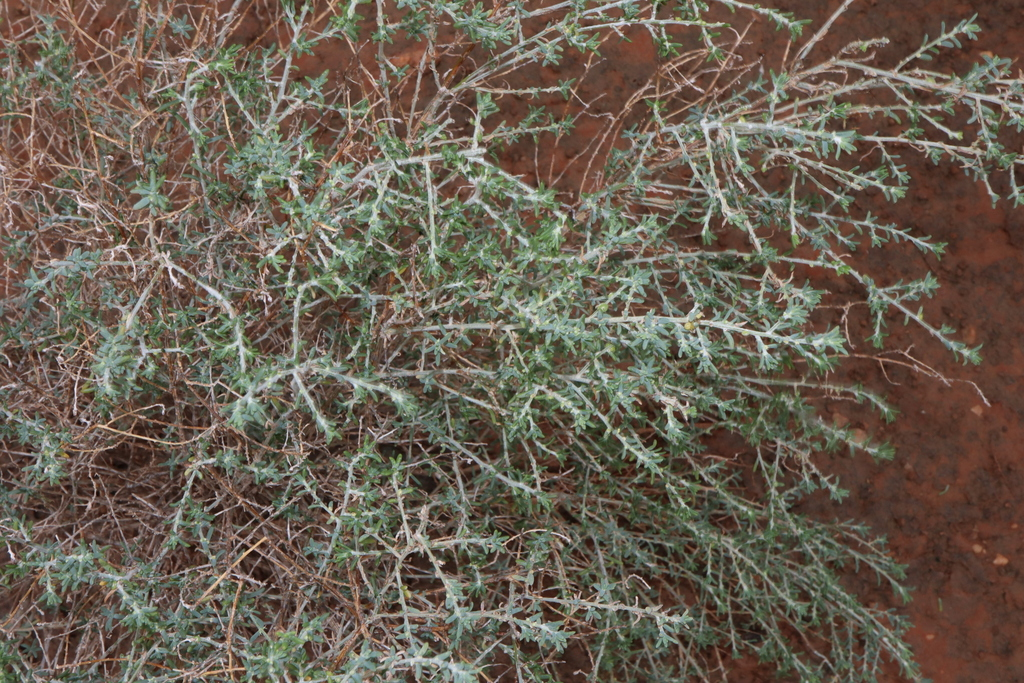
Habit near Mutawintji in far western N.S.W.

Maireana microcarpa, commonly known as swamp bluebush, is a species of flowering plant in the family Amaranthaceae and is endemic to south-eastern, continental Australia. It is a weakly upright shrub with slender branches covered with woolly white hairs when young, fleshy, terete leaves, flowers arranged singly and a dark brown or pale, tube-shaped fruiting perianth with a simple wing.

== Description ==
Maireana microcarpa is a weakly upright shrub that typically grows to a height of up to about 40 cm (16 in) and has slender branches that are loosely covered with woolly white hairs when young. The leaves are fleshy, arranged alternately, subterete to egg-shaped with the narrower end towards the base, mostly 3–5 mm (0.12–0.20 in) long and glabrous. The flowers are arranged singly, bisexual and glabrous, the fruiting perianth glabrous with a shortly cup-shaped tube 1.5 mm (0.059 in) high and 2 mm (0.079 in) in diameter, ribbed and crust-like, with a wing 5–6 mm (0.20–0.24 in) in diameter with a radial slit.

== Taxonomy ==
This species was first formally described in 1870 by George Bentham who gave it the name Kochia villosa var. microcarpa in his Flora Australiensis. In 1975, Paul Wilson transferred the species to Maireana as M. microcarpa in the journal Nuytsia. The specific epithet (microcarpa) means 'small-fruited'.

== Distribution and habitat ==
Swamp bluebush usually grows on claypans in western New South Wales, northern South Australia, southern Northern Territory and south-western Queensland.

== Conservation status ==
Maireana microcarpa is listed as "near threatened' under the Northern Territory Government Territory Parks and Wildlife Conservation Act but as of "least concern" in Queensland under the Nature Conservation Act 1992.
