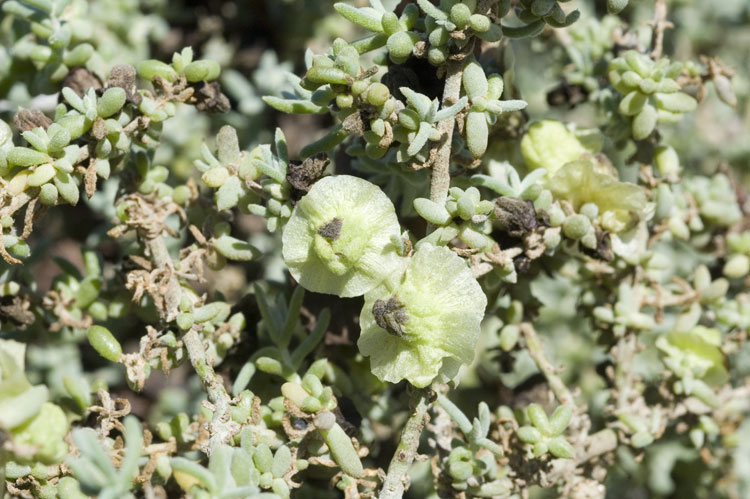
- In the Australian Arid Lands Botanic Garden

Scientific classification
- Kingdom: Plantae
- Clade: Embryophytes
- Clade: Tracheophytes
- Clade: Angiosperms
- Clade: Eudicots
- Order: Caryophyllales
- Family: Amaranthaceae
- Genus: Maireana
- Species: M. rohrlachii

Binomial name
- Maireana rohrlachii (Paul.G.Wilson) Paul.G.Wilson

Synonyms
- Kochia rohrlachii Paul G.Wilson

= Maireana rohrlachii =

Species of plant

Maireana rohrlachii, commonly known as Rohrlach's bluebush, is a species of flowering plant in family Amaranthaceae and is endemic to south-eastern continental Australia. It is an intricately branched shrub with its branchlets covered with woolly hairs, mostly unisexual flowers and a glabrous fruiting perianth with a broadly top-shaped to hemispherical tube and a thinly papery wing.

== Description ==
Maireana rohrlachii is an intricately branched shrub or subshrub that typically grows to a height of up to 1 m (3 ft 3 in) and has thin branches with woolly hairs. Its leaves are arranged alternately, fleshy, oval to narrowly spindle-shaped, 3–8 mm (0.12–0.31 in) long. The flowers are unisexual and arranged singly and glabrous, the fruiting perianth glabrous and pale brown why dry. The tube is broadly top-shaped to hemispherical, about 2 mm (0.079 in) high and 3 mm (0.12 in) in diameter, thin-walled and easily crushed. The wing is thinly papery, horizontal and 12–16 mm (0.47–0.63 in) in diameter.

== Taxonomy and naming ==
This species was first formally described in 1965 by Paul Graham Wilson who gave it the name Kochia rohrlachii in the supplement to J.M.Black's Flora of South Australia from a specimen collected in 1959 near Buckleboo on the Eyre Peninsula. In 1975, Wilson transferred the species to Maireana as M. rohrlachii in the journal Nuytsia. The specific epithet, rohrlachii, honours Kenneth Desmond Rohrlach, who collected the type specimens.

== Distribution and habitat ==
Rohrlach's bluebush is mainly found in the Gawler bioregion of South Australia, the north-west of Victoria where it is not common, and the south-west plains of New South Wales.
