= Maireana planifolia =

Scientific classification
- Kingdom: Plantae
- Clade: Tracheophytes
- Clade: Angiosperms
- Clade: Eudicots
- Order: Caryophyllales
- Family: Amaranthaceae
- Genus: Maireana
- Species: M. planifolia

Binomial name
- Maireana planifolia (F.Muell.) Paul G.Wilson

Synonyms
- Kochia planifolia F.Muell.; Kochia tomentosa var. platyphylla Ising

Species of plant in the amaranth family

Maireana planifolia, commonly known as low bluebush is a species of flowering plant in the family Amaranthaceae, and is endemic to western parts of Australia. It is an openly-branched shrub with woolly branches, flattened, egg-shaped leaves, flowers arranged singly or in pairs, and a straw-coloured fruiting perianth with a translucent horizontal wing.

== Description ==
Maireana planifolia is an openly-branched shrub that typically grows to a height of about 1 m (3 ft 3 in), its branches covered with woolly hairs. Its leaves are narrowly egg-shaped with the narrower end towards the base, mostly 8–15 mm (0.31–0.59 in) long and covered with soft hairs pressed against the surface. The flowers are arranged singly or in pairs and are glabrous. The fruiting perianth is straw-coloured to pale brown with a top-shaped, thin-walled tube, and a translucent horizontal wing 10–14 mm (0.39–0.55 in) in diameter.

== Taxonomy ==
This species was first formally described in 1859 by Ferdinand von Mueller who gave it the name in his Kochia planifolia in his Fragmenta Phytographiae Australiae from specimens collected by Augustus Oldfield. In 1975, Paul G. Wilson transferred the species to Maireana as M. planifolia in the journal Nuytsia. The specific epithet (planifolia) means 'flat-leaved', referring to the fruiting perianth.

== Distribution and habitat ==
Low bluebush grows on the rocky slopes of hills in sand and in mulga scrub between latitudes 22°S and 31°S in Western Australia, in the southern half of the Northern Territory and in the north of South Australia.
