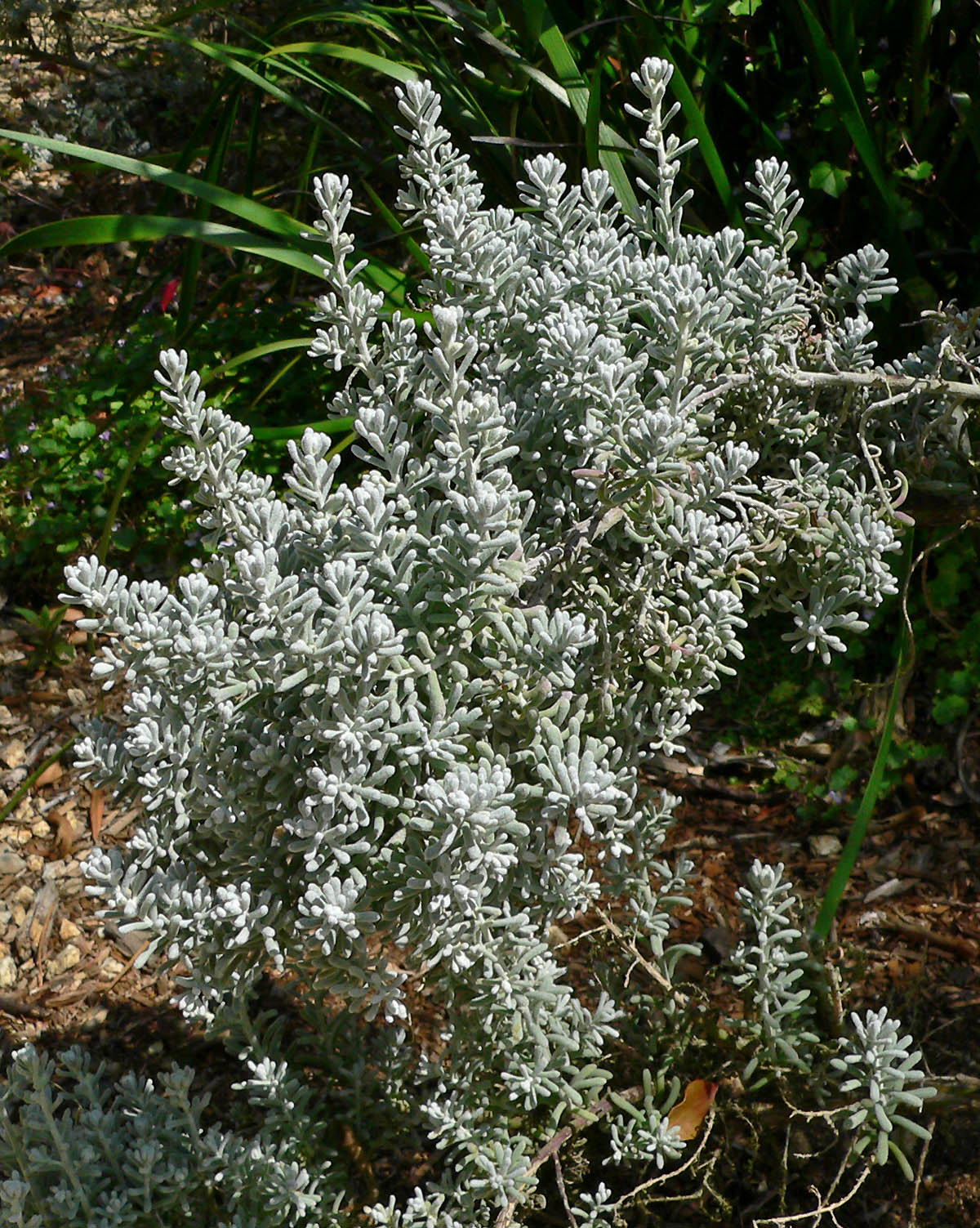
- Maireana sedifolia

Scientific classification
- Kingdom: Plantae
- Clade: Tracheophytes
- Clade: Angiosperms
- Clade: Eudicots
- Order: Caryophyllales
- Family: Amaranthaceae
- Subfamily: Camphorosmoideae
- Tribe: Camphorosmeae
- Genus: Maireana; Moq.

Synonyms
- List: Bassia sect. Maireana (Moq.) Volkens; Bassia sect. Spinosissimae Ising; Duriala (R.H.Anderson) Ulbr.; Enchylaena sect. Heterochlamys F.Muell.; Heterochlamys F.Muell. nom. inval., nom. nud.; Kochia sect. Austrokochia Ulbr.; Kochia sect. Duriala R.H.Anderson nom. inval.; Kochia sect. Maireana (Moq.) F.Muell.; Kochia auct. non Roth: Brown, R. (27 March 1810); Kochia auct. non Roth: Bentham, G. (1870), Flora Australiensis; Kochia auct. non Roth: Black, J.M. (January 1948), Casuarinaceae-Euphorbiaceae. Flora of South Australia; Kochia auct. non Roth: Willis, J.H. (1973), A Handbook to Plants in Victoria

= Maireana =

Genus of flowering plants

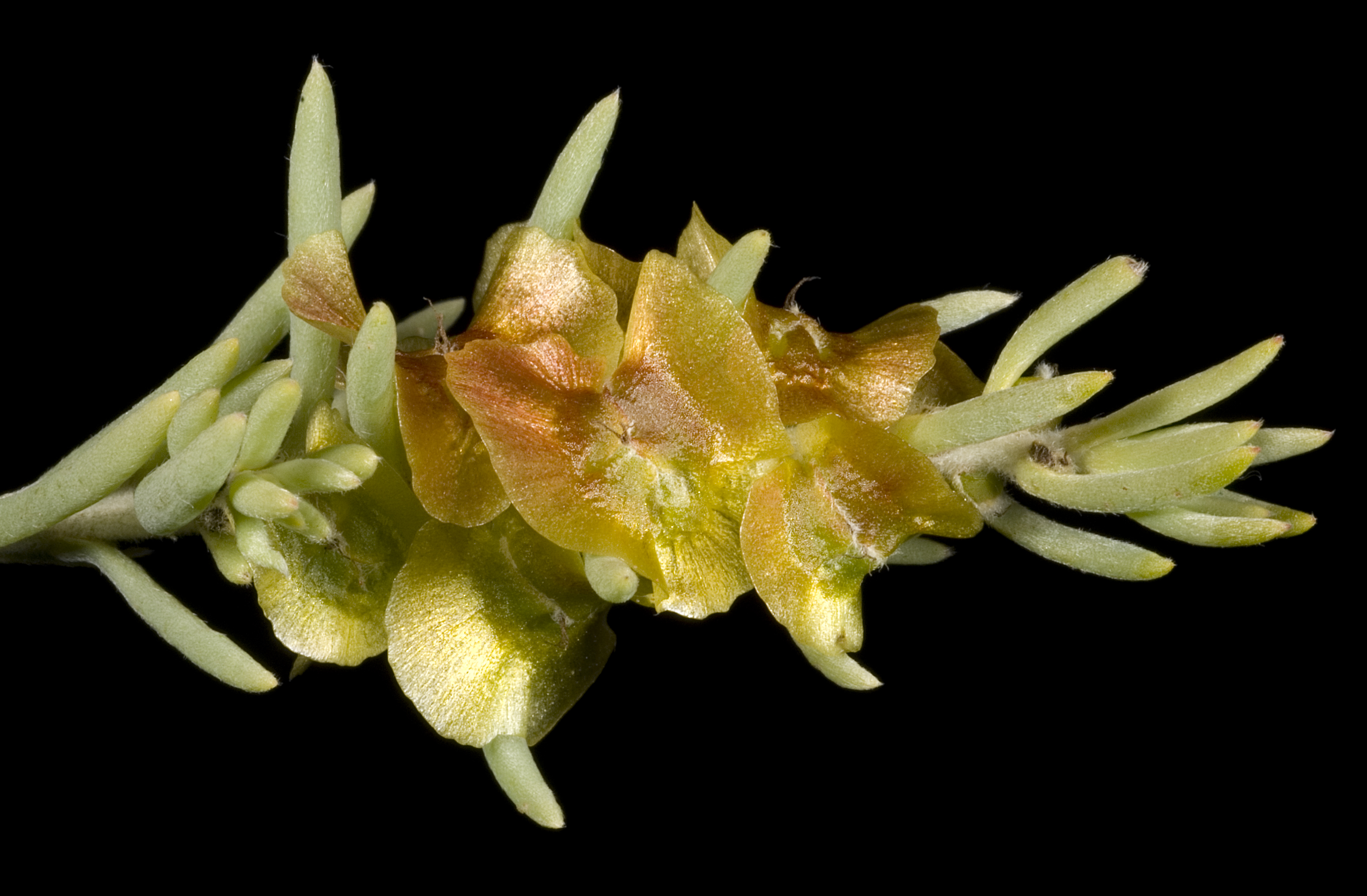
Fruit of Maireana georgei

Maireana is a genus of around 58 species of flowering plants commonly known as bluebushes, in the family Amaranthaceae that are endemic to Australia. Plants in the genus Maireana are herbaceous to woody perennial plants or small shrubs with often fleshy or succulent leaves, sessile flowers with five petals and five stamens, and the fruit is a utricle containing a single seed.

== Description ==
Plants in the genus Maireana are herbaceous to woody perennials or small shrubs that are glabrous or sometimes covered with woolly hairs. The leaves are globe-shaped to terete or narrowly oblong, often fleshy or succulent. The flowers are sessile, arranged singly or in pairs in leaf axils and are dioecious or hermaphrodite with five petals and five stamens opposite the petals. The ovary is more or less spherical with a short style and two or three linear stigmas. The perianth of the fruit has a wing, sometimes divided into separate leathery wings, at the base lobes that more or less obscure the utricle. The utricle is disc-like, top-shaped or spherical and contains a single seed.

== Taxonomy ==
The genus Maireana was first formally described in 1840 by the botanist, Moquin-Tandon and named to honour Joseph François Maire (1780–1867), an amateur botanist who befriended him during the author's first visit to Paris in 1834. The type species is Maireana tomentosa.

== Distribution ==
Species of Maireana, known as bluebushes, are found in all mainland states of Australia.

=== Species list ===
The following species of Maireana are accepted by the Australian Plant Census as at April 2025:

- Maireana amoena (Diels) Paul G.Wilson (W.A.)
- Maireana aphylla (R.Br.) Paul G.Wilson - cotton bush or leafless bluebush (N.T., W.A., S.A., Qld., Vic, N.S.W.)
- Maireana appressa (Benth.) Paul G.Wilson – grey bluebush (W.A., S.A., N.T., Qld., N.S.W., Vic.)
- Maireana astrotricha (L.A.S.Johnson) Paul G.Wilson – low bluebush, southern bluebush, grey bluebush (N.S.W., Qld., N.T.)
- Maireana atkinsiana (W.Fitzg.) Paul G.Wilson (W.A.)
- Maireana brevifolia (R.Br.) Paul G.Wilson - small-leaf bluebush, eastern cotton bush, short-leaf bluebush (W.A., N.T., S.A., Qld., N.S.W., Vic.)
- Maireana campanulata Paul G.Wilson – bell-fruit bluebush (S.A., N.T., Qld., N.S.W.)
- Maireana cannonii (J.M.Black) Paul G.Wilson – Cannon's bluebush (S.A.)
- Maireana carnosa (Moq.) Paul G.Wilson – cottony bluebush (W.A., N.T., S.A., Qld.)
- Maireana cheelii (R.H.Anderson) Paul G.Wilson – chariot wheels (N.S.W., Vic.)
- Maireana ciliata (F.Muell.) Paul G.Wilson – fissure weed, hairy bluebush (N.T., S.A., Qld., N.S.W., Vic.)
- Maireana convexa Paul G.Wilson – mulga bluebush (W.A.)
- Maireana coronata (J.M.Black) Paul G.Wilson – crown fissure-weed (N.T., S.A., Qld., N.S.W.)
- Maireana decalvans (Gand.) Paul G.Wilson – black cottonbush (N.S.W., Vic., Qld., S.A.)
- Maireana dichoptera (F.Muell.) Paul G.Wilson (Qld., N.T.)
- Maireana diffusa Paul G.Wilson (W.A.)
- Maireana enchylaenoides (F.Muell.) Paul G.Wilson – wingless bluebush, wingless fissure-weed (Qld., N.S.W., Vic., S.A., W.A.)
- Maireana eriantha (F.Muell.) Paul G.Wilson – woolly bluebush (S.A., N.T., N.S.W., Qld.)
- Maireana erioclada (Benth.) Paul G.Wilson – rosy bluebush, fleshy bluebush (N.S.W., N.T., S.A., Vic.)
- Maireana eriosphaera Paul G.Wilson (W.A.)
- Maireana excavata (J.M.Black) Paul G.Wilson
- Maireana georgei (Diels) Paul G.Wilson - slit-wing bluebush or satiny bluebush (N.T.)
- Maireana glomerifolia (F.Muell. & Tate) Paul G.Wilson – ball-leaf bluebush (W.A.)
- Maireana humillima (F.Muell.) Paul G.Wilson (Qld., N.S.W., Vic.)
- Maireana integra (Paul G.Wilson) Paul G.Wilson – entire-wing bluebush (W.A.,S.A., N.T., Qld., N.S.W.)
- Maireana lanosa (Lindl.) Paul G.Wilson – woolly bluebush (W.A.,S.A., N.T., Qld., N.S.W.)
- Maireana lobiflora (Benth.) Paul G.Wilson – lobed bluebush (W.A.,S.A., N.T., Qld., N.S.W.,Vic.)
- Maireana luehmannii (F.Muell.) Paul G.Wilson – Luehman's bluebush (W.A., N.T., S.A., Qld.)
- Maireana marginata (Benth.) Paul G.Wilson (W.A.)
- Maireana melanocarpa Paul G.Wilson – black-fruit bluebush (S.A.)
- Maireana melanocoma (F.Muell.) Paul G.Wilson – pussy bluebush (W.A.)
- Maireana microcarpa (Benth.) Paul G.Wilson – swamp bluebush (N.T., S.A., Qld., N.S.W.)
- Maireana microphylla (Moq.) Paul G.Wilson – cotton bush, small-leaf bluebush, eastern cottonbush (Qld., N.S.W., Vic.)
- Maireana murrayana (Ewart & B.Rees) Paul G.Wilson (W.A.)
- Maireana obrienii N.G.Walsh (Vic., N.S.W., Qld.)
- Maireana oppositifolia (F.Muell.) Paul G.Wilson – heathy bluebush (W.A., S.A., Vic.)
- Maireana ovata (Ising) Paul G.Wilson (N.S.W., S.A., N.T.)
- Maireana pentagona (R.H.Anderson) Paul G.Wilson – hairy bluebush, slender fissure-weed (N.S.W., Vic., S.A., Qld., W.A.)
- Maireana pentatropis (Tate) Paul G.Wilson – erect mallee bluebush (N.S.W., Vic., S.A., W.A., N.T.)
- Maireana planifolia (F.Muell.) Paul G.Wilson – low bluebush (W.A., S.A., N.T.)
- Maireana platycarpa Paul G.Wilson – shy bluebush (W.A.)
- Maireana polypterygia (Diels) Paul G.Wilson – many-winged bluebush, Gascoyne bluebush (W.A.)
- Maireana prosthecochaeta (F.Muell.) Paul G.Wilson (W.A.)
- Maireana pyramidata (Benth.) Paul G.Wilson – sago bush, black bluebush, shrubby bluebush (W.A., N.T., S.A., Qld., N.S.W., Vic.)
- Maireana radiata (Paul G.Wilson) Paul G.Wilson – grey bluebush (W.A., S.A., Vic., N.S.W.)
- Maireana rohrlachii (Paul G.Wilson) Paul G.Wilson – Rohrlach's bluebush (S.A., Vic., N.S.W.)
- Maireana schistocarpa Paul G.Wilson – split-fruit bluebush (N.T., S.A., Qld., N.S.W.)
- Maireana scleroptera (J.M.Black) Paul G.Wilson – hard-wing bluebush (S.A., N.T., W.A.)
- Maireana sedifolia (F.Muell.) Paul G.Wilson - pearl bluebush, pearl saltbush, hoary bluebush (N.S.W., Vic., S.A., N.T., W.A.)
- Maireana spongiocarpa (F.Muell.) Paul G.Wilson – spongy-fruit bluebush (Qld., N.S.W., NT, S.A.)
  - Maireana sp. Patience (C.P.Campbell 1052) WA Herbarium
  - Maireana sp. Rainbow Valley (A91207) NT Herbarium
- Maireana stipitata Paul G.Wilson (W.A.)
- Maireana suaedifolia (Paul G.Wilson) Paul G.Wilson – lax bluebush (W.A., S.A.)
- Maireana thesioides (C.A.Gardner) Paul G.Wilson – mulga bluebush, lax bluebush (W.A.)
- Maireana tomentosa Moq. – felty bluebush (W.A., N.T., S.A., N.S.W.)
  - Maireana tomentosa Moq. subsp. tomentosa (W.A., N.T.)
  - Maireana tomentosa subsp. urceolata Paul G.Wilson (S.A., N.S.W.)
- Maireana trichoptera (J.M.Black) Paul G.Wilson – mallee bluebush, pink-seeded bluebush, downy bluebush, spike bluebush (W.A., N.T., S.A., N.S.W., Vic.)
- Maireana triptera (Benth.) Paul G.Wilson – three-wing bluebush (W.A., S.A., N.T., Qld., N.S.W., Vic.)
- Maireana turbinata Paul G.Wilson – satiny bluebush (W.A., S.A., N.T., Qld., N.S.W., Vic.)
- Maireana villosa (Lindl.) Paul G.Wilson – silky bluebush, common bluebush (W.A., S.A., N.T., Qld., N.S.W.)
