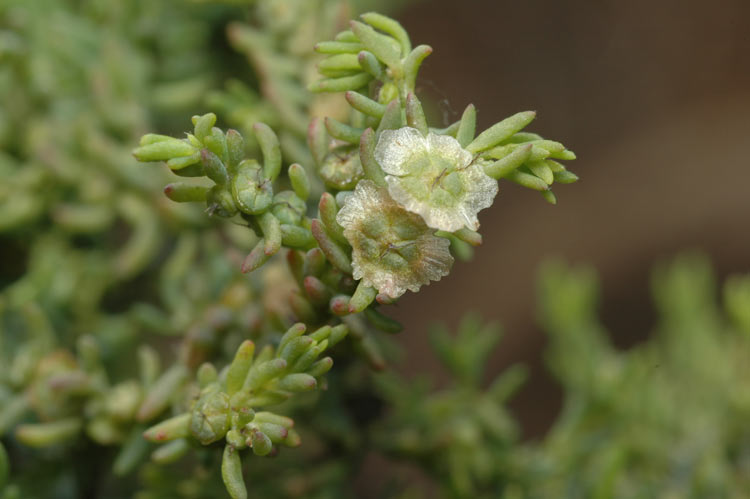
- Near Morangarell

Scientific classification
- Kingdom: Plantae
- Clade: Tracheophytes
- Clade: Angiosperms
- Clade: Eudicots
- Order: Caryophyllales
- Family: Amaranthaceae
- Genus: Maireana
- Species: M. microphylla

Binomial name
- Maireana microphylla (Moq.) Paul G.Wilson

Synonyms
- Enchylaena microphylla Moq.; ? Enchylaena tomentosa var. leptophylla Benth.; Kochia microphylla (Moq.) F.Muell.; ? Kochia tomentosa f. tenuis Domin; Kochia tamariscina auct. non (Lindl.) J.M.Black

= Maireana microphylla =

Species of plant in the amaranth family

Maireana microphylla, commonly known as cotton bush, small-leaf bluebush or eastern cottonbush, is a species of flowering plant in the family Amaranthaceae and is endemic to eastern Australia. It is a widely-branched shrub with slender branches, more or less terete leaves, flowers arranged singly but forming dense, leafy spikes and a tube-shaped fruiting perianth with a simple wing with a notched edge.

== Description ==
Maireana microphylla is a weakly upright shrub that typically grows to a height of up to 1 m (3 ft 3 in) and has slender branches that are sometimes covered with hairs pressed against the surface. The leaves are arranged alternately, subterete, mostly 2–4 mm (0.079–0.157 in) long. The flowers are arranged singly but form densely dense, leafy spikes, the fruiting perianth glabrous with a shallowly hemispherical tube 1.5–2 mm (0.059–0.079 in) high in diameter and sometimes with a wing about 7 mm (0.28 in) in diameter with a radial slit and a notched edge.

== Taxonomy ==
This species was first formally described in 1849 by Alfred Moquin-Tandon who gave it the name Enchylaena microphylla in de Candolle's Prodromus Systematis Naturalis Regni Vegetabilis. In 1975, Paul Wilson transferred the species to Maireana as M. microphylla in the journal Nuytsia. The specific epithet (microphylla) means 'small-leaved'.

== Distribution and habitat ==
Cottonbush is a widespread colonising species in heavy loamy or poorer soils in south-eastern Queensland, eastern New South Wales and northern Victoria.

== Conservation status ==
Maireana microphylla is listed as "endangered' in Victoria under the Victorian Government Flora and Fauna Guarantee Act.
