= Maireana lanosa =

Scientific classification
- Kingdom: Plantae
- Clade: Tracheophytes
- Clade: Angiosperms
- Clade: Eudicots
- Order: Caryophyllales
- Family: Amaranthaceae
- Genus: Maireana
- Species: M. lanosa

Binomial name
- Maireana lanosa (Lindl.) Paul G.Wilson

Synonyms
- Kochia lanosa Lindl.; Kochia lanosa Lindl. var. lanosa; Kochia lanosa var. minor Benth.

Species of plant

Maireana lanosa, commonly known as woolly bluebush, is a species of flowering plant in the family Amaranthaceae and is endemic to Australia. It is a small, widely branched shrub with woolly branches, elliptic to narrowly egg-shaped leaves, and bisexual flowers arranged singly, the glabrous fruiting perianth tube-shaped with a wing with erect processes.

== Description ==
Maireana lanosa is a small, widely branched shrub that typically grows to a height of up to 50 cm (20 in) and has branches covered with woolly hairs. Its leaves are arranged alternately, elliptic to egg-shaped with the narrower end towards the base, about 4 mm (0.16 in) long in the upper fruiting branches and 10–20 mm (0.39–0.79 in) long in the lower branches, and covered with soft, silky hairs. The flowers are bisexual, arranged singly and densely covered with woolly hairs. The fruiting perianth is leathery to crusty, with a slightly convex tube 1 mm (0.039 in) high and 2.5 mm (0.098 in) wide at the top, and glabrous. The wing is simple, horizontal and 7–12 mm (0.28–0.47 in) in diameter with a single slit and six linear to tapering processes 3–4 mm (0.12–0.16 in) long.

== Taxonomy ==
This species was first described in 1848 by John Lindley who gave it the name Kochia lanosa in Thomas Mitchell's Journal of an Expedition into the Interior of Tropical Australia. In 1975, Paul G. Wilson transferred the species to Maireana as M. lanosa in the journal Nuytsia. The specific epithet (lanosa) means 'abounding in wool'.

== Distribution and habitat ==
Maireana lanosa grows in sandy or loamy soils from the far north-west of Western Australia, through the south of the Northern Territory, and South Australia to south-western Queensland but is presumed extinct in New South Wales.
