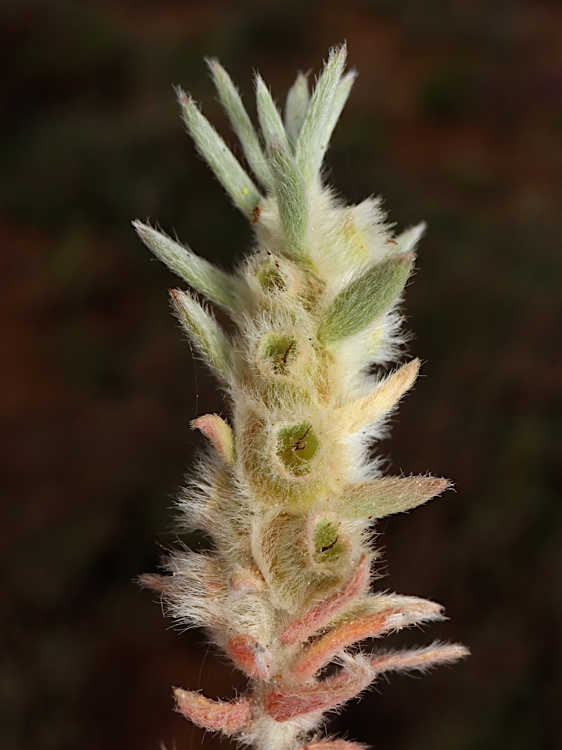

Scientific classification
- Kingdom: Plantae
- Clade: Tracheophytes
- Clade: Angiosperms
- Clade: Eudicots
- Order: Caryophyllales
- Family: Amaranthaceae
- Genus: Maireana
- Species: M. coronata

Binomial name
- Maireana coronata (J.M.Black) Paul G.Wilson

Synonyms
- Kochia coronata J.M.Black

= Maireana coronata =

Species of plant

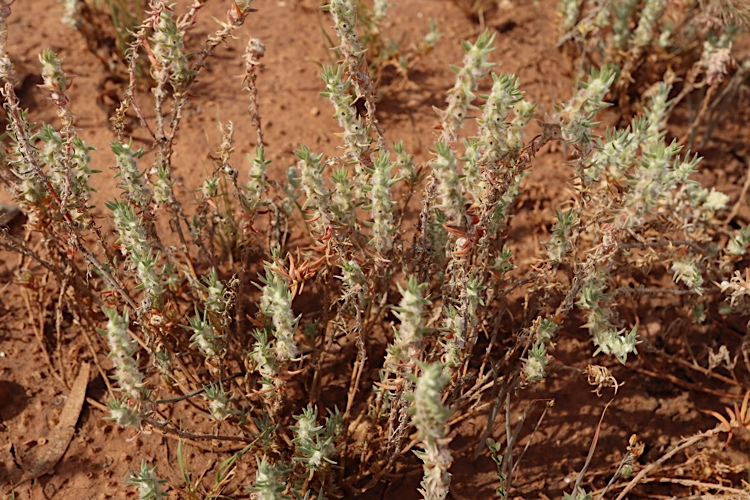
Habit near Louth racecourse

Maireana coronata, commonly known as crown fissure-weed, is a species of flowering plant in the family Amaranthaceae and is endemic to Australia. It is a low-lying to erect perennial plant with linear leaves, bisexual flowers arranged singly, and a hairy fruiting perianth resembling an inverted academic "mortar board" hat, with a narrow circular wing.

== Description ==
Maireana coronata is a low-lying to erect perennial plant that grows to a height of up to 15 cm (5.9 in) and has a woody base. Its branches are covered with woolly hairs and the leaves are linear, 7–20 mm (0.28–0.79 in) long, and covered with shaggy or silky hairs pressed against the surface. The flowers are bisexual and arranged singly in leafy spikes. The fruiting perianth is covered with silky hairs, with a flat base continuous with a circular wing about 4 mm (0.16 in) in diameter, and resembles an inverted academic "mortar board" hat.

== Taxonomy ==
This species was first described in 1917 by John McConnell Black who gave it the name Kochia coronata in his Prodromus Florae Novae Hollandiae. In 1975, Paul G. Wilson transferred the species to Maireana as M. coronata in the journal Nuytsia. The specific epithet (coronata) means 'crowned'.

== Distribution and habitat ==
Maireana coronata usually grows in heavy soils, often dominated by Mitchell grass, from near Alice Springs in the south of the Northern Territory to northern South Australia and to the east of the Great Dividing Range in Queensland and New South Wales.
