= Maireana stipitata =

Scientific classification
- Kingdom: Plantae
- Clade: Tracheophytes
- Clade: Angiosperms
- Clade: Eudicots
- Order: Caryophyllales
- Family: Amaranthaceae
- Genus: Maireana
- Species: M. stipitata

Binomial name
- Maireana stipitata Paul G.Wilson

Species of plant

Maireana stipitata is a species of flowering plant in the family Amaranthaceae and is endemic to the west of Western Australia. It is a widely branching shrub with white woolly branches, semi-terete leaves, flowers arranged singly and a somewhat compressed fruiting perianth with a wavy, papery wing.

== Description ==
Maireana stipitata is a widely branching shrub that typically grows to a height of up to 1 m (3 ft 3 in) and has branches covered with white, woolly hairs. Its leaves are arranged alternately, fleshy semiterete, 6–10 mm (0.24–0.39 in) long with a few woolly hairs. The flowers are dioecious or bisexual and arranged singly, the fruiting perianth is flattened, pale brown with a very short tube and top-shaped, produced at the base into a prominent, very thick-walled stalk 1.5–3 mm (0.059–0.118 in) long. The wing is simple, wavy and papery 10–14 mm (0.39–0.55 in) in diameter.

== Taxonomy and naming ==
Maireana stipitata was first formally described in 1975 by Paul G. Wilson in the journal Nuytsia. The specific epithet (stipitata) means stipitate, (possessing a stalk).

== Distribution and habitat ==
This species of bluebush grows in sub-saline areas and is found in the Shark Bay region and in the Dampier Archipelago in the Carnarvon, Pilbara and Yalgoo bioregions in the west of Western Australia.
