= Maireana diffusa =

Scientific classification
- Kingdom: Plantae
- Clade: Tracheophytes
- Clade: Angiosperms
- Clade: Eudicots
- Order: Caryophyllales
- Family: Amaranthaceae
- Genus: Maireana
- Species: M. diffusa

Binomial name
- Maireana diffusa Paul G.Wilson

Species of plant in the amaranth family

Maireana diffusa is a species of flowering plant in the family Amaranthaceae, and is endemic to Western Australia. It is an erect or straggly, widely branched shrub with oval leaves, the narrower end towards the base, and longer cigar-shaped leaves, bisexual flowers arranged singly, and a top-shaped fruiting perianth with fan-shaped wings.

== Description ==
Maireana diffusa is an erect or straggly, widely branched shrub that typically grows to a height of up to 1 m (3 ft 3 in) and has slender branchlets covered with a few woolly hairs when young. The leaves on short side branches are arranged alternately, oval with the narrower end towards the base, about 3 mm (0.12 in) long. The leaves on the erect branches are narrowly cigar-shaped, up to 15 mm (0.59 in) long. Its flowers are bisexual and are arranged singly and glabrous, with two bracteoles 0.7 mm (0.028 in) long at the base. The fruiting perianth has a thin-walled tube about 2 mm (0.079 in) in diameter with 5 thin, fan-shaped wings about 2 mm (0.079 in) long.

== Taxonomy ==
Maireana diffusa was first formally described in 1975 by Paul Wilson in the journal Nuytsia from specimens he collected near Cowcowing Lakes in 1968. The specific epithet (diffusa) means 'spread out' or 'diffuse'.

== Distribution and habitat ==
This species of Maireana grows in saline soils near salt lakes between Dalwallinu and Merredin in the Avon Wheatbelt, Coolgardie and Murchison bioregions of Western Australia.

== Conservation status ==
Maireana diffusa is listed as "not threatened" by the Government of Western Australia Department of Biodiversity, Conservation and Attractions.
