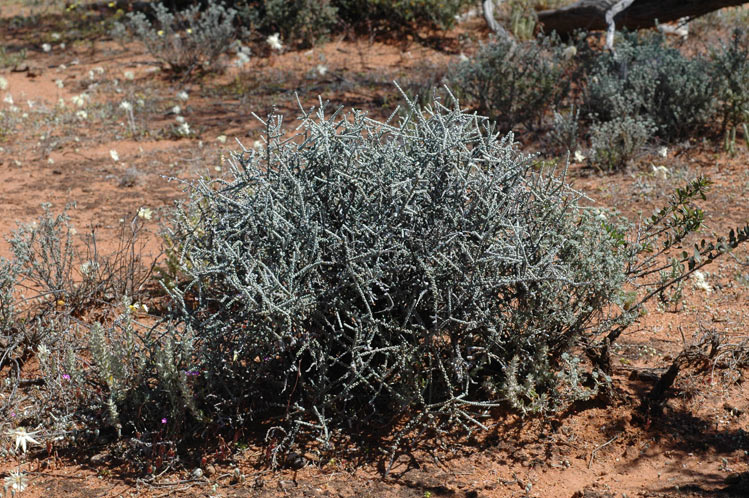

Scientific classification
- Kingdom: Plantae
- Clade: Tracheophytes
- Clade: Angiosperms
- Clade: Eudicots
- Order: Caryophyllales
- Family: Amaranthaceae
- Genus: Maireana
- Species: M. glomerifolia

Binomial name
- Maireana glomerifolia (F.Muell. & Tate) Paul G.Wilson

Synonyms
- Kochia glomerifolia F.Muell. & Tate

= Maireana glomerifolia =

Species of plant in the amaranth family

Maireana glomerifolia, commonly known as ball-leaf bluebush, is a species of flowering plant in the family Amaranthaceae and is endemic to Western Australia. It is a rigid, openly branched shrub with brittle, woolly branches covered with compact clusters of sessile, fleshy, woolly leaves, flowers in short spikes on the ends of branches, and a thin-walled, pink to red fruiting perianth with a simple, wavy wing.

== Description ==
Maireana glomerifolia is a rigid, openly-branched shrub that typically grows to a height of up to 60 cm (24 in) and has brittle branches covered with woolly hairs and compact clusters of leaves. The leaves are sessile, fleshy and woolly, those near the ends of the branches about 1.5 mm (0.059 in) long, otherwise minutes and in dense clusters known as "glomerules". The flowers are sessile and arranged in short wooly spikes and are polygamodioecious. The fruiting perianth is thin walled, pink to red at maturity, with a simple, wavy wing up to 15 mm (0.59 in) in diameter.

== Taxonomy ==
This species was first formally described in 1896 by Ferdinand von Mueller and Ralph Tate who gave it the name Kochia glomerifolia in Transactions, Proceedings and Report, Royal Society of South Australia. In 1975, Paul Wilson transferred the species to Maireana as M. glomerifolia in the journal Nuytsia. The specific epithet (glomerifolia) means 'a ball of yarn leaved', referring to the leaves being in small, globular clusters.

== Distribution and habitat ==
Ball-leaf bluebush grows in stony soils or clay in saline or sub-saline areas and on rocky hillsides and claypans in the Avon Wheatbelt, Coolgardie, Gascoyne, Great Victoria Desert, Mallee, Murchison and Yalgoo bioregions of Western Australia.
