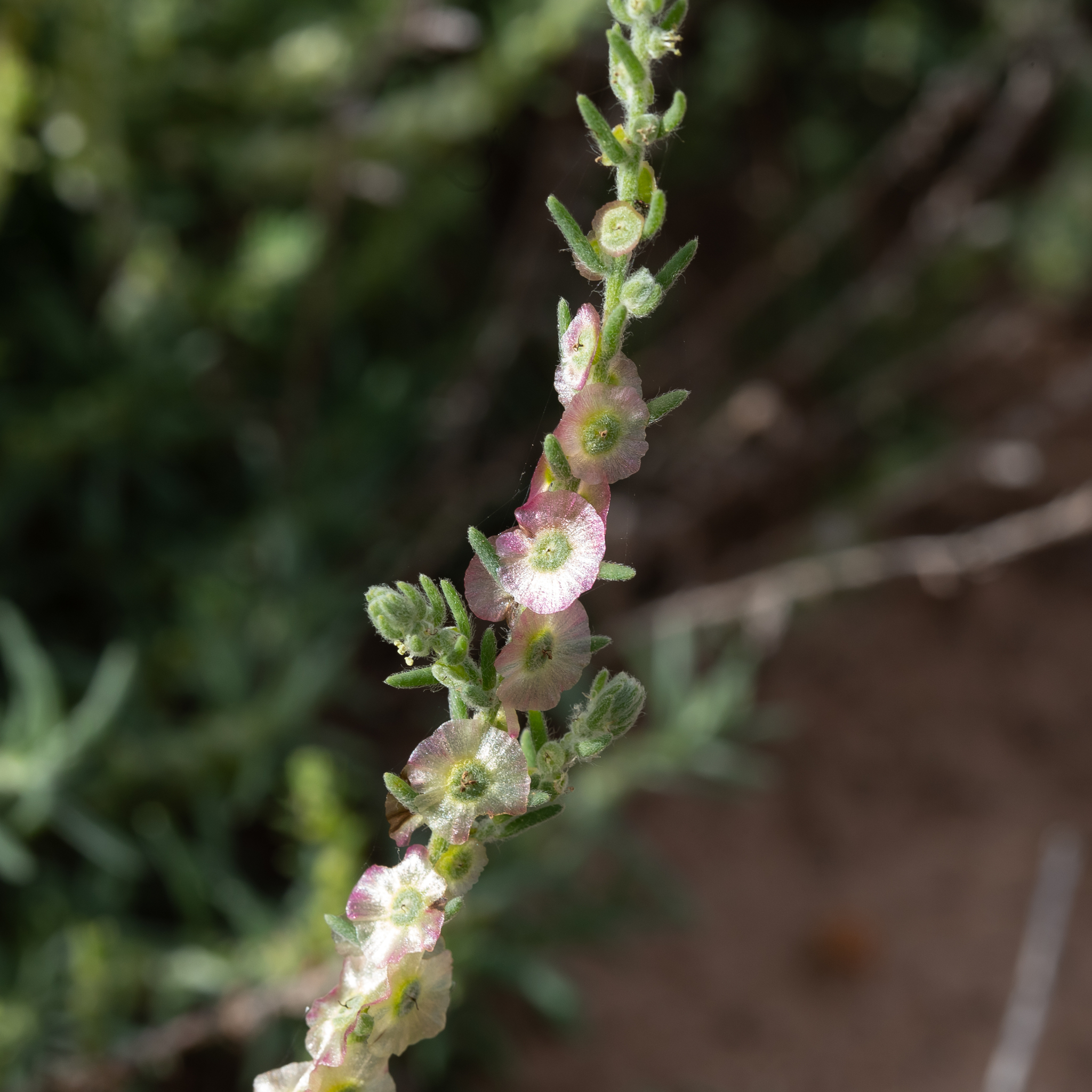
- In Idalia National Park

Scientific classification
- Kingdom: Plantae
- Clade: Tracheophytes
- Clade: Angiosperms
- Clade: Eudicots
- Order: Caryophyllales
- Family: Amaranthaceae
- Genus: Maireana
- Species: M. villosa

Binomial name
- Maireana villosa (Lindl.) Paul G.Wilson

Synonyms
- Kochia tomentosa var. lindleyana Domin; Kochia villosa Lindl.; Kochia villosa Lindl var. villosa

= Maireana villosa =

Species of plant

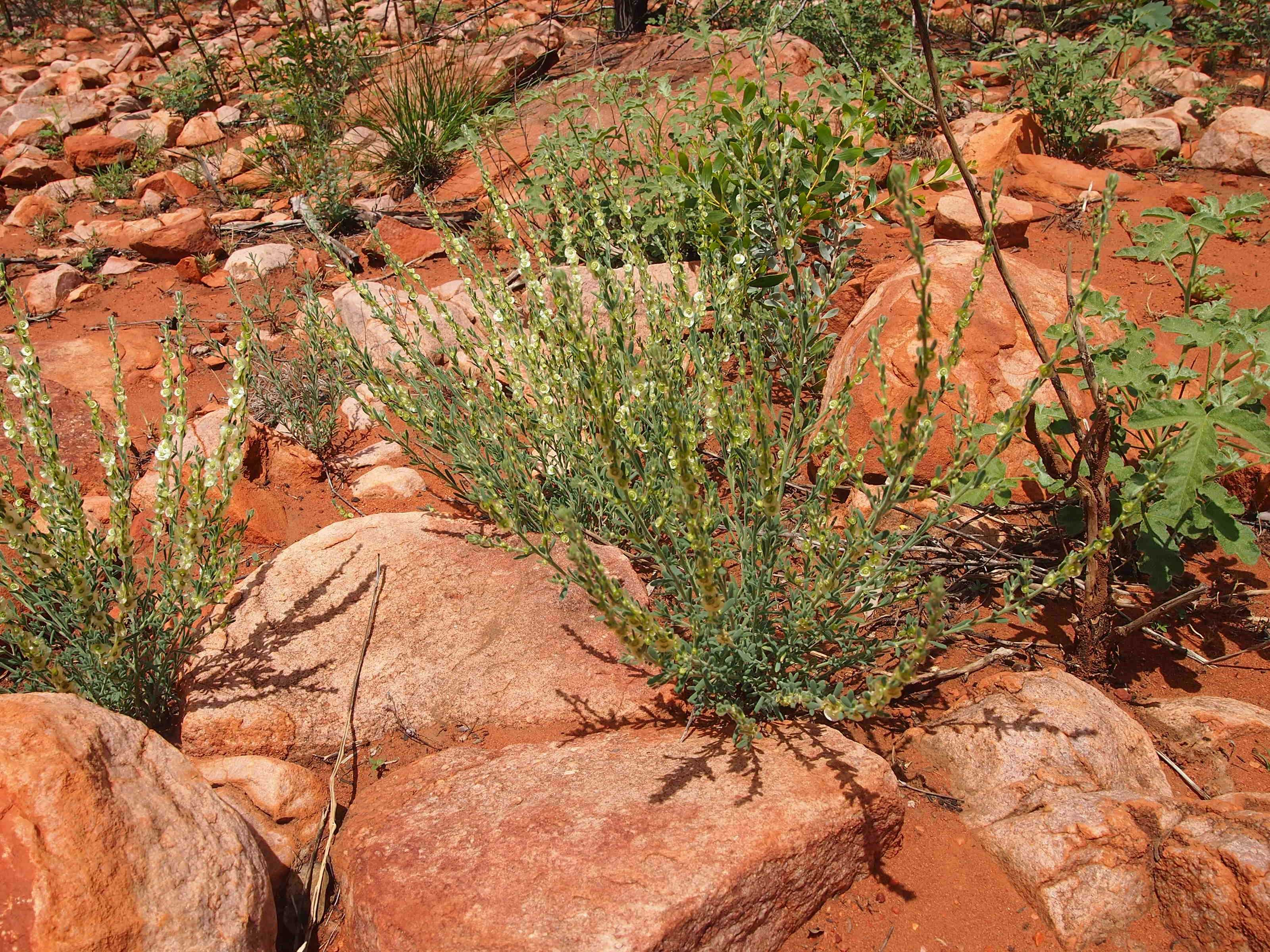
Habit

Maireana villosa, commonly known as silky bluebush, or common bluebush, is a species of flowering plant in the family Amaranthaceae and is endemic to mainland Australia. It is an open, hairy, ascending subshrub or shrub with semi-succulent linear to oblong or narrowly lance-shaped leaves with the narrower end towards the base, mostly bisexual flowers arranged singly or in pairs, and a fruiting perianth with a more or less horizontal wing with a radial slit.

== Description ==
Maireana villosa is an open, ascending subshrub or shrub that typically grows up to 80 cm (31 in) high and has its current season's stems hairy. The leaves are arranged alternately, semi-succulent, linear to oblong or narrowly lance-shaped with the narrower end towards the base,5–25 mm (0.20–0.98 in) long and mostly 0.8–2.5 mm (0.031–0.098 in) wide and sparsely hairy. The flowers are bisexual and arranged singly or in pairs. The fruiting perianth is brown when dry, with a thin tube about 1 mm (0.039 in) long, and a horizontal wing about 7–10 mm (0.28–0.39 in) in diameter.

== Taxonomy ==
This species was first formally described in 1848 by John Lindley who gave it the name Kochia villosa in Thomas Mitchell's Journal of an Expedition into the Interior of Tropical Australia. In 1975 Paul Graham Wilson transferred the species to Maireana as M. villosa in the journal Nuytsia. The specific epithet (villosa) means 'villous', or 'with long, soft hairs.

== Distribution and habitat ==
Maireana villosa is widespread in mainland Australia where it grows in loam, clay or sand, often in stony soils or on red-earth plains and dune swales in Western Australia, the Northern Territory, South Australia, Queensland, and western New South Wales.
