= Maireana convexa =

Scientific classification
- Kingdom: Plantae
- Clade: Tracheophytes
- Clade: Angiosperms
- Clade: Eudicots
- Order: Caryophyllales
- Family: Amaranthaceae
- Genus: Maireana
- Species: M. convexa

Binomial name
- Maireana convexa Paul G.Wilson

Synonyms
- Kochia ciliata F.Muell.

Species of plant in the amaranth family

Maireana convexa, commonly known as mulga bluebush, is a species of flowering plant in the family Amaranthaceae, and is endemic to Western Australia. It is an open, widely branched shrub or subshrub with fleshy, linear leaves, sometimes with silky hairs, bisexual flowers arranged singly, and a top-shaped fruiting perianth with a papery wing.

== Description ==
Maireana convexa is an open, widely branched shrub or subshrub that typically grows to a height of 1–2 m (3 ft 3 in – 6 ft 7 in) and has woolly hairy branchlets. Its leaves are arranged alternately, fleshy, linear to more or less round in cross section, 10–20 mm (0.39–0.79 in) long, about 1.5 mm (0.059 in) wide and sometimes covered with silky hairs. Its flowers are bisexual and are arranged singly and glabrous, the upper perianth deeply lobed and covered with woolly hairs. The fruiting perianth has a broadly top-shaped tube about 3 mm (0.12 in) long and 5 mm (0.20 in) wide with a papery, horizontal wing about 15 mm (0.59 in) in diameter and a single radial slit.

== Taxonomy ==
Maireana convexa was first formally described in 1975 by Paul Wilson in the journal Nuytsia from specimens he collected 19 km (12 mi) east of Leonora in 1968. The specific epithet (convexa) means 'convex', referring to the fruiting perianth of this species.

== Distribution and habitat ==
Mulga bluebush usually grows in non-saline soils in mulga habitat between latitudes 25°S and 30°S.

== Conservation status ==
Maireana convexa is listed as "not threatened" by the Government of Western Australia Department of Biodiversity, Conservation and Attractions.
