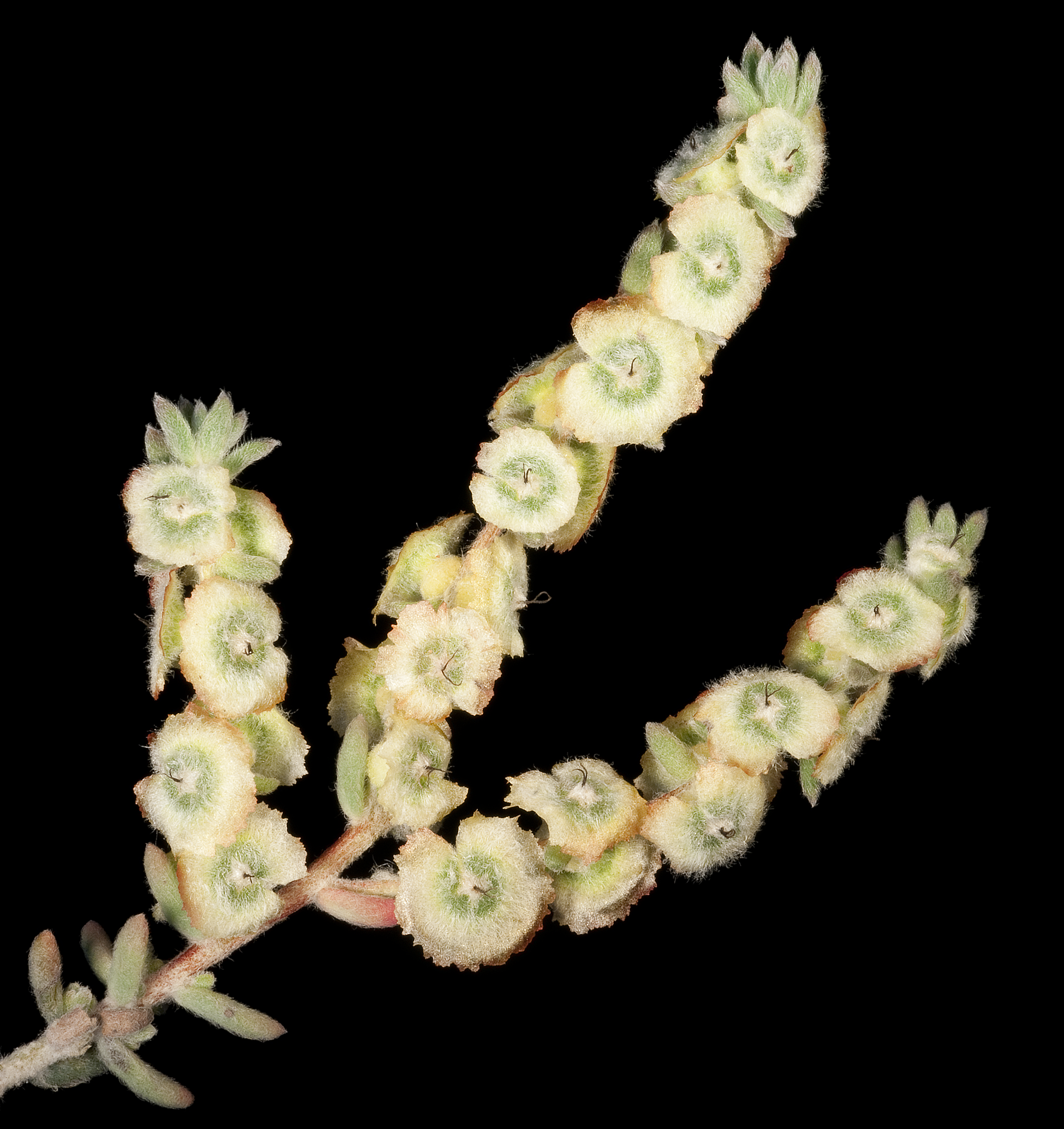

Scientific classification
- Kingdom: Plantae
- Clade: Tracheophytes
- Clade: Angiosperms
- Clade: Eudicots
- Order: Caryophyllales
- Family: Amaranthaceae
- Genus: Maireana
- Species: M. trichoptera

Binomial name
- Maireana trichoptera (J.M.Black) Paul G.Wilson

Synonyms
- Bassia dallachyana (Benth.) F.Muell. Chenolea dallachyana Benth. Kochia excavata var. trichoptera J.M.Black; Kochia villosa var. lasioptera F.Muell.

= Maireana trichoptera =

Mallee bluebush

Plant species

Maireana trichoptera, commonly known as mallee bluebush, pink-seeded bluebush or downy bluebush, or spike bluebush, is a species of flowering plant in the family Amaranthaceae, native to all mainland states and territories of Australia except Queensland. It is an erect perennial shrub with white, woolly branches, fleshy semiterete leaves, white bisexual flowers arranged singly, and a hairy fruiting perianth with a thin, horizontal wing.

== Description ==
Maireana trichoptera is an erect, perennial shrub that typically grows up to 50 cm (20 in) high, with woolly hairy branches. The leaves are fleshy, semiterete or narrowly club-shaped, 5–12 mm (0.20–0.47 in) long and covered with fine, soft hairs. The flowers are bisexual and arranged singly, sometimes crowded in spikes at the ends of branches. The fruiting perianth is about 10–12 mm (0.39–0.47 in) long and mostly covered with soft hairs on most of the upper surface, with a tube about 4 mm (0.16 in) high, constricted in the middle, the lower half expanded into a fleshy, hollow stalk enclosing the receptacle. The wing is thin, about 10 mm (0.39 in) in diameter and covered with soft hairs, and has a single slit.

== Taxonomy ==
This species was first formally described in 1923 by John McConnell Black, who gave it the name Kochia excavata var. trichoptera in Transactions and proceedings of the Royal Society of South Australia. In 1975, Paul Graham Wilson transferred the species to the genus, Maireana as Maireana trichoptera in the journal Nuytsia. The specific epithet (trichoptera) means 'hair-winged', referring to a ridge on the perianth tube.

== Distribution and habitat ==
Maireana trichoptera is widespread in western New South Wales, western Victoria, South Australia, temperate Western Australia and the southern part of the Northern Territory. In New South Wales it is widespread usually on lighter soils in the west of that state, in Victoria it is found on deep sand or on heavier loamy soils with belah (Casuarina pauper), and in the Northern Territory it occurs on gravelly rises, low hills and breakaways.
