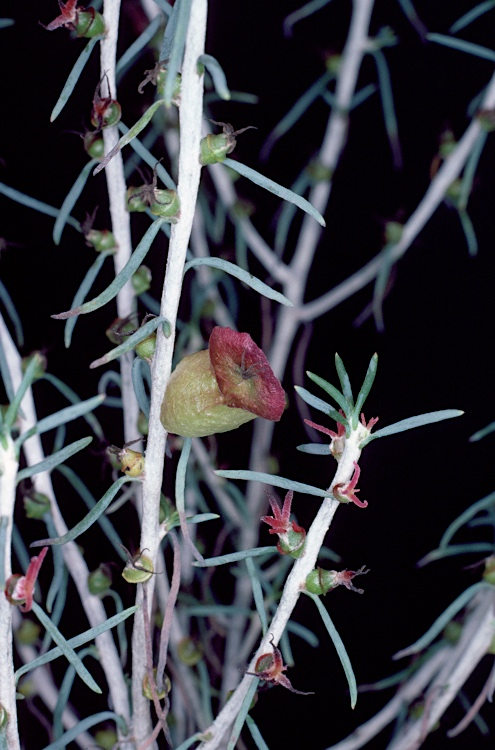
- In the Australian National Botanic Gardens

Scientific classification
- Kingdom: Plantae
- Clade: Tracheophytes
- Clade: Angiosperms
- Clade: Eudicots
- Order: Caryophyllales
- Family: Amaranthaceae
- Genus: Maireana
- Species: M. spongiocarpa

Binomial name
- Maireana spongiocarpa (F.Muell.)Paul G.Wilson

Synonyms
- Kochia spongiocarpa F.Muell.

= Maireana spongiocarpa =

Species of plant

Maireana spongiocarpa, commonly known as spongy-fruit bluebush, is a species of flowering plant in the family Amaranthaceae and is endemic to Central Australia. It is a small shrub with thin woolly branches, well-spaced fleshy, narrowly terete or spindle-shaped leaves, bisexual flowers and a soft, easily crushed fruiting perianth with a broadly top-shaped, spongy, swollen tube with a horizontal wing.

== Description ==
Maireana spongiocarpa is a spreading or erect subshrub that typically grows to a height of about 30 cm (12 in) and has thin branches densely covered with woolly hairs. Its leaves are well-spaced, fleshy narrowly terete or spindle-shaped, fleshy, 8–15 mm (0.31–0.59 in) long. The flowers are bisexual, arranged singly and glabrous except for the margins of perianth lobes. The fruiting perianth is glabrous and dark brown when dry, the tube spongy, swollen and more or less spherical, about 8 mm (0.31 in) high and wide. The wing is horizontal, 12–15 mm (0.47–0.59 in) in diameter.

== Taxonomy and naming ==
This species was first formally described in 1887 by Ferdinand von Mueller, who gave it the name Kochia spongiocarpa in The Victorian Naturalist. In 1975, Paul G. Wilson transferred the species to Maireana as M. spongiocarpa in the journal Nuytsia.

== Distribution and habitat ==
Spongy-fruit bluebush is found in south-western Queensland, north-western New South Wales, the south of the Northern Territory and north-eastern South Australia and occurs on gravelly rises, low hills and breakaways.
