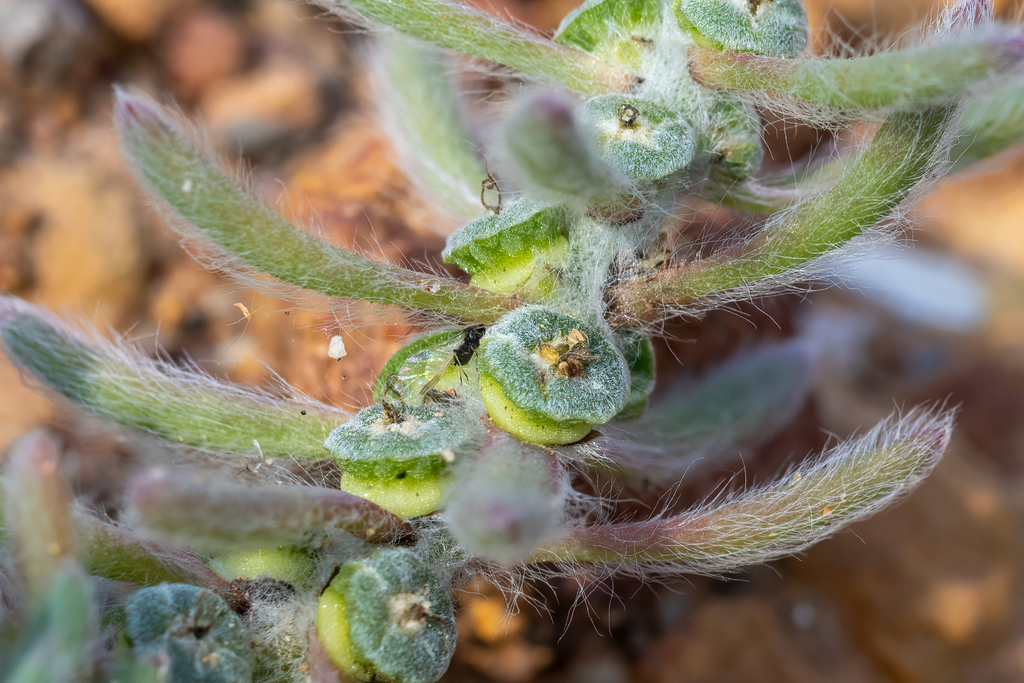

Scientific classification
- Kingdom: Plantae
- Clade: Tracheophytes
- Clade: Angiosperms
- Clade: Eudicots
- Order: Caryophyllales
- Family: Amaranthaceae
- Genus: Maireana
- Species: M. marginata

Binomial name
- Maireana marginata (Benth.) Paul G.Wilson

Synonyms
- Bassia micrantha (Benth.) F.Muell.; Enchylaena marginata Benth.; ? Enchylaena micrantha Benth.; Kochia massoni Ewart orth. var.; Kochia massonii Ewart

= Maireana marginata =

Species of plant in the amaranth family

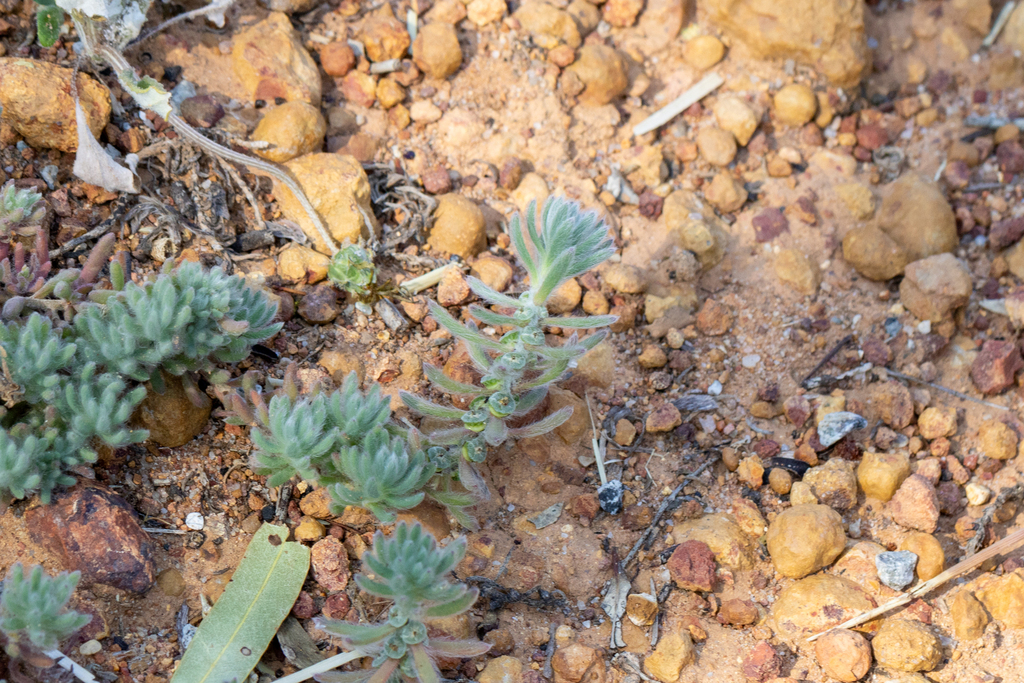
Habit near Piawaning

Maireana marginata is a species of flowering plant in the family Amaranthaceae and is endemic to the south-west of Western Australia. It is a prostrate to low-lying perennial herb with a woody root stock and slender branches, fleshy linear to narrowly oblong leaves, single flowers and a fleshy, barrel shaped fruiting perianth with a narrow wing.

== Description ==
Maireana marginata is a prostrate to low-lying perennial herb with a woody rootstock and slender branches that are somewhat woolly when young. The leaves fleshy and arranged alternately, linear to narrowly oblong, 5–10 mm (0.20–0.39 in) long and hairy. The flowers are arranged singly with two bracteoles about 1 mm (0.039 in) long at the base. The fruiting perianth is barrel-shaped, fleshy and flat with a tube bulging in the lower half with 10 rounded ribs and a wing that is a narrow extension to the flat upper perianth.

== Taxonomy ==
This species was first formally described in 1870 by George Bentham who gave it the name Enchylaena marginata in his Flora Australiensis. In 1975, Paul Wilson transferred the species to Maireana as M. marginata in the journal Nuytsia. The specific epithet (marginata) means 'furnished with a border', referring to the fruit.

== Distribution and habitat ==
This species of bluebush grows in heavy loam, clay, sandy loam and gravel in woodland and on scree slopes between Morawa and Ravensthorpe in the Avon Wheatbelt, Coolgardie, Esperance Plains, Geraldton Sandplains, Mallee, Murchison and Yalgoo bioregions of Western Australia.
