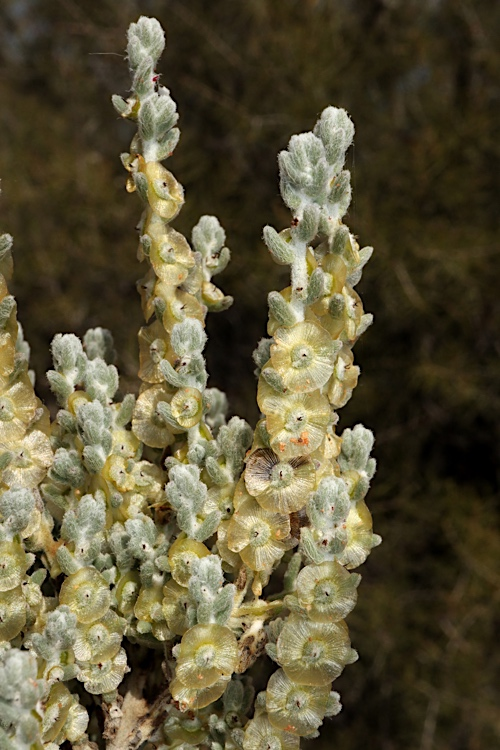

Scientific classification
- Kingdom: Plantae
- Clade: Tracheophytes
- Clade: Angiosperms
- Clade: Eudicots
- Order: Caryophyllales
- Family: Amaranthaceae
- Genus: Maireana
- Species: M. radiata

Binomial name
- Maireana radiata (Paul.G.Wilson) Paul.G.Wilson

Synonyms
- Kochia radiata Paul G.Wilson

= Maireana radiata =

Species of plant

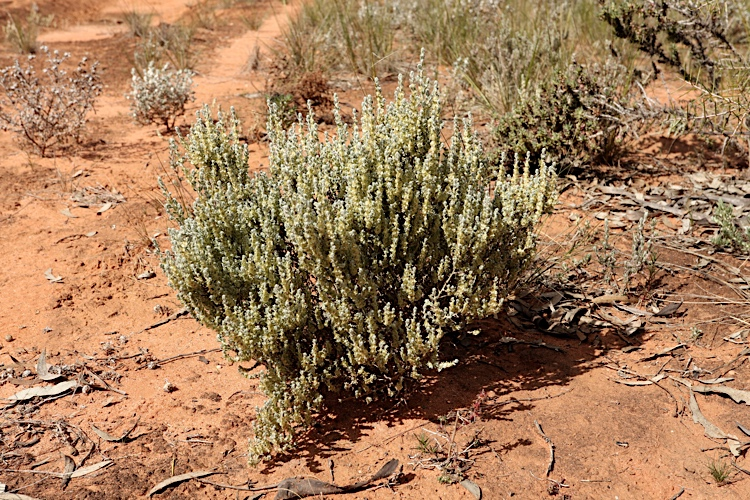
Habit in Mallee Cliffs National Park

Maireana radiata, commonly known as grey bluebush, is a species of flowering plant in family Amaranthaceae and is endemic to southern continental Australia. It is an erect, grey, densely branched shrub with its branches covered with woolly hairs, mostly unisexual flowers and a glabrous fruiting perianth with a brittle, almost woody tube and a papery wing.

== Description ==
Maireana radiata is an erect, grey, densely branched shrub that typically grows to a height of 30 cm (12 in) and has woolly branches with white hairs at first, later dark brown. Its leaves are arranged alternately, erect, fleshy, narrowly egg-shaped to more or less terete, with a few woolly hairs and 2–4 mm (0.079–0.157 in) long. The flowers are unisexual, glabrous below and woolly above. The fruiting perianth is glabrous except for the upper densely woolly upper perianth, the tube hemispherical, up to 1 mm (0.039 in) high and 1.5 mm (0.059 in) in diameter, brittle or almost woody, the wing papery, horizontal and usually up to 4–6 mm (0.16–0.24 in) in diameter.

== Taxonomy and naming ==
This species was first formally described in 1965 by Paul Graham Wilson who gave it the name Kochia radiata in the supplement to J.M.Black's Flora of South Australia from a specimen he collected in 1960 on the Eyre Peninsula about 20 km (12 mi) north of Ceduna. In 1984, Wilson transferred the species to Maireana as M. radiata in the journal Nuytsia. The specific epithet, radiata, means 'radiating outwards' and refers to the nerves of the wing of the fruit.

== Distribution and habitat ==
Grey bluebush is widespread in drier areas of Australia, growing on slightly saline or alkaline calcareous soils, in the Avon Wheatbelt, Coolgardie, Esperance Plains, Great Victoria Desert, Hampton, Mallee and Nullarbor bioregions of Western Australia, the south of South Australia, the north-west of Victoria and the far south-west of New South Wales.
