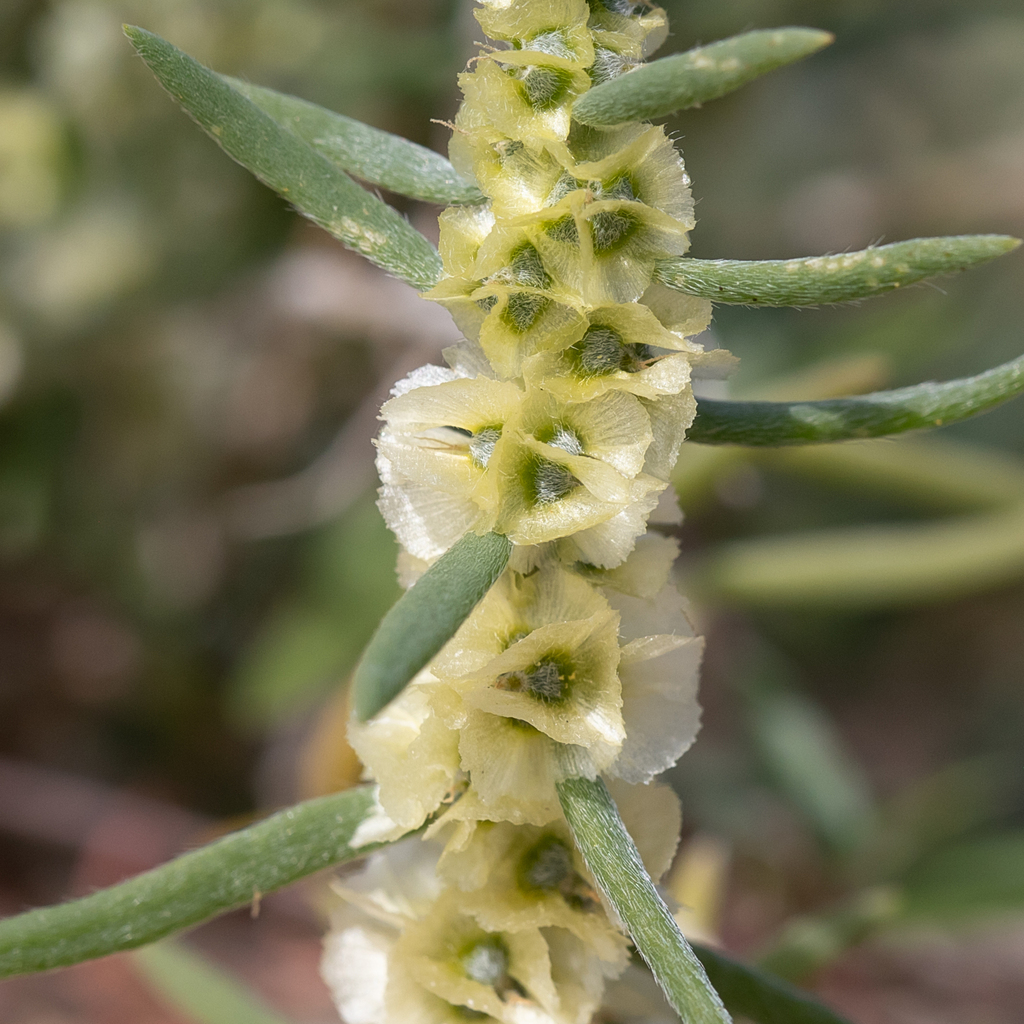

Scientific classification
- Kingdom: Plantae
- Clade: Tracheophytes
- Clade: Angiosperms
- Clade: Eudicots
- Order: Caryophyllales
- Family: Amaranthaceae
- Genus: Maireana
- Species: M. dichoptera

Binomial name
- Maireana dichoptera (F.Muell.) Paul G.Wilson

Synonyms
- Kochia dichoptera F.Muell.

= Maireana dichoptera =

Species of plant in the amaranth family

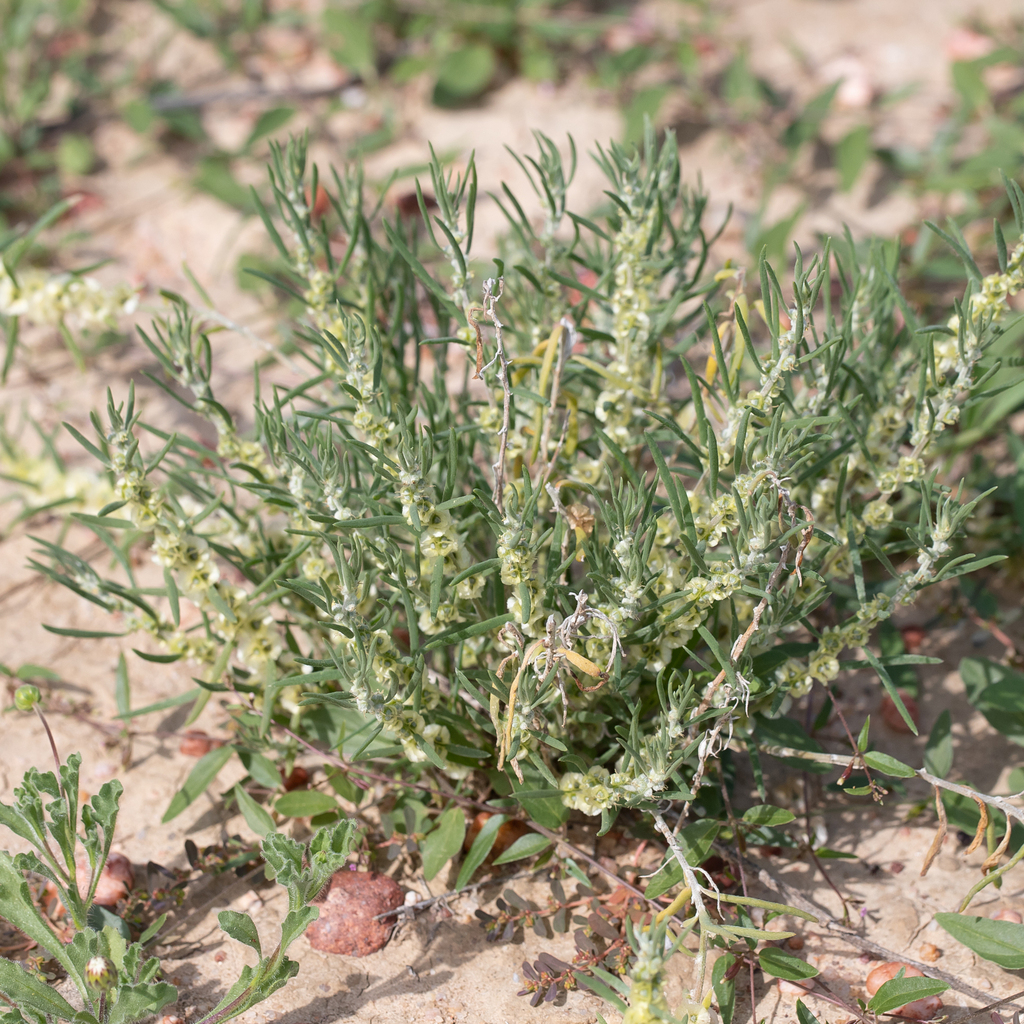
Habit north of Longreach

Maireana dichoptera is a species of flowering plant in the family Amaranthaceae and is endemic to northern Australia. It is an erect perennial plant with woolly branches, linear leaves with shaggy hairs pressed against the surface, bisexual flowers arranged singly or in pairs, and a thin-walled fruiting perianth with a six vertical wings on top of a horizontal wing.

== Description ==
Maireana dichoptera is an erect perennial that typically grows to a height of up to 20 cm (7.9 in) and has a thin, woolly branches. Its leaves are arranged alternately, linear, 7–25 mm (0.28–0.98 in) long with shaggy hairs pressed against the surface. The flowers are bisexual, woolly and arranged singly or in pairs in leaf axils, the fruiting perianth with a thin-walled tube about 2.5 mm (0.098 in) in diameter with six vertical wings on top of a circular, horizontal wing about 7 mm (0.28 in) in diameter.

== Taxonomy ==
This species was first formally described in 1873 by Ferdinand von Mueller who gave it the name Kochia dichoptera in his Fragmenta Phytographiae Australiae from specimens collected on Bowen Downs Station by Charles Weldon Birch. In 1975, Paul G. Wilson transferred the species to Maireana as M. dichoptera in the journal Nuytsia.

== Distribution ==
Maireana dichoptera is found in central and southern Queensland and in the Mitchell Grass Downs bioregion of the Northern Territory near the Queensland border.

== Conservation status ==
Maireana dichoptera is listed as of "least concern" under the Queensland Government Nature Conservation Act 1992, but as "near threatened" under the Territory Parks and Wildlife Conservation Act.
