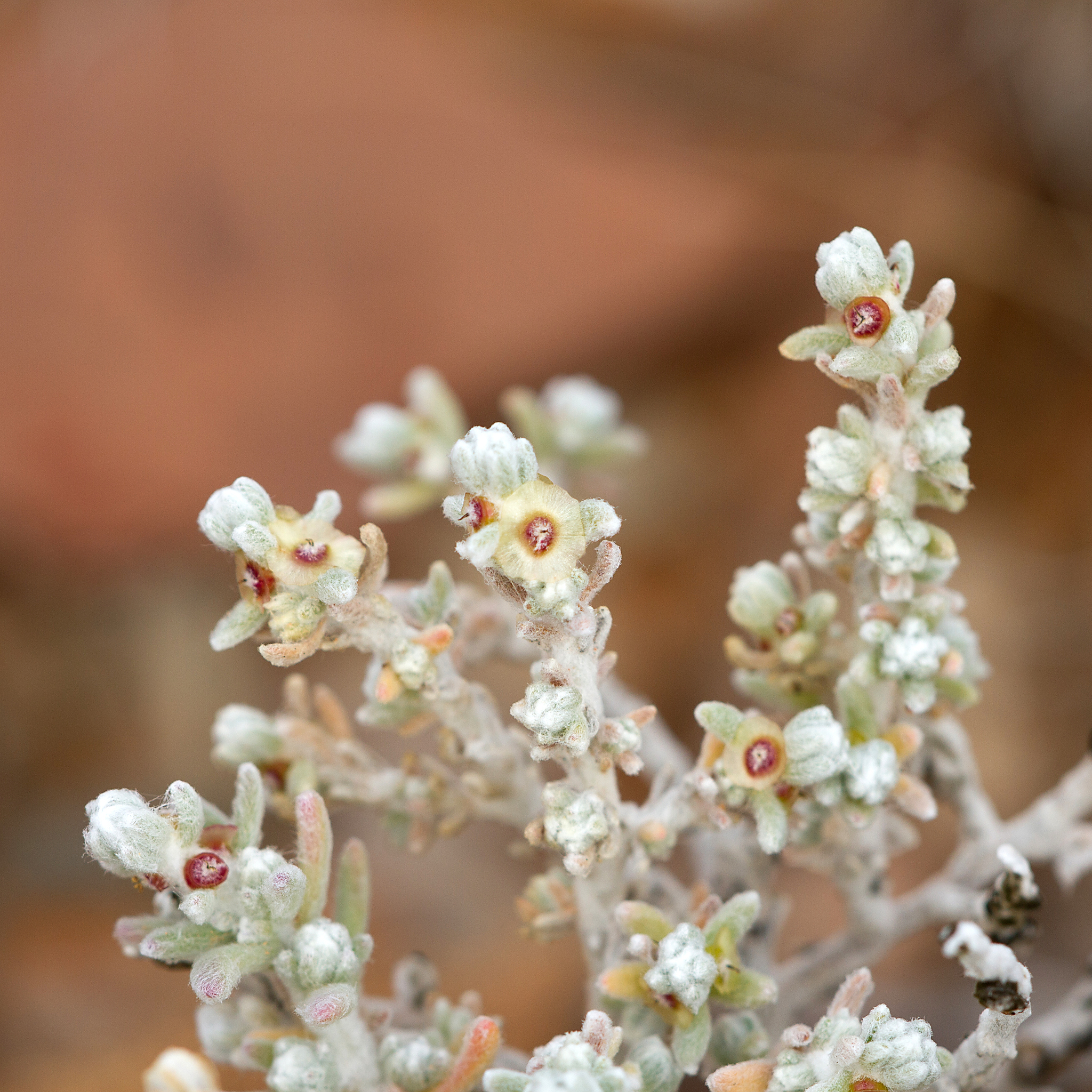
- Near Farina, South Australia

Scientific classification
- Kingdom: Plantae
- Clade: Tracheophytes
- Clade: Angiosperms
- Clade: Eudicots
- Order: Caryophyllales
- Family: Amaranthaceae
- Genus: Maireana
- Species: M. melanocarpa

Binomial name
- Maireana melanocarpa Paul G.Wilson

= Maireana melanocarpa =

Species of plant in the amaranth family

Maireana melanocarpa, commonly known as black-fruit bluebush, is a species of flowering plant in the family Amaranthaceae and is endemic to South Australia. It is a multi-branched shrub or subshrub with woolly branches, more or less terete woolly leaves, flowers arranged singly and a dark brown to black fruiting perianth with a horizontal wing with dark brown veins.

== Description ==
Maireana melanocarpa is a multi-branched shrub or subshrub that typically grows to a height of up to about 50 cm (20 in) abd has woolly branches. The leaves are arranged alternately, semiterete, 3–5 mm (0.12–0.20 in) long, about 1 mm (0.039 in) wide and woolly. The flowers are arranged singly and the fruiting perianth is dark brown to black at maturity, with a shortly hemispherical tube about 2 mm (0.079 in) long and 1 mm (0.039 in) high, rigid and ribbed. The wing is horizontal, up to 6 mm (0.24 in) wide with dark brown veins with a radial slit.

== Taxonomy ==
Maireana melanocarpa was first formally described in 1975 by Paul Wilson in the journal Nuytsia from specimens collected on Mount Lyndhurst in 1955. The specific epithet (melanocarpa) means 'black-fruited'.

== Distribution and habitat ==
Black-fruit bluebush grows in on sandy rises around salt lakes between Beltana and Lake Watherstone near Leigh Creek, west of the north Flinders Range.
