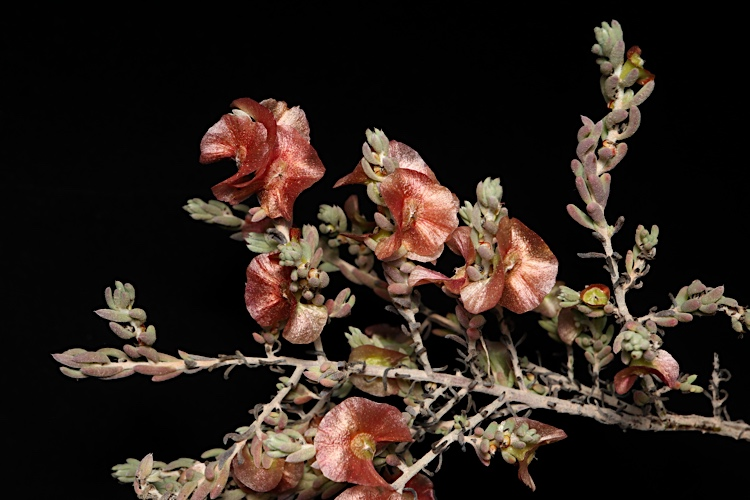
- Near the Gunbar-Booligal Road

Scientific classification
- Kingdom: Plantae
- Clade: Tracheophytes
- Clade: Angiosperms
- Clade: Eudicots
- Order: Caryophyllales
- Family: Amaranthaceae
- Genus: Maireana
- Species: M. turbinata

Binomial name
- Maireana turbinata Paul G.Wilson

= Maireana turbinata =

Species of plant

Maireana turbinata, commonly known as satiny bluebush, is a species of flowering plant in the family Amaranthaceae and is endemic to mainland Australia. It is an openly branched, perennial shrub with woolly branchlets, succulent, semiterete leaves, mostly bisexual flowers arranged singly, and a glabrous fruiting perianth with a top-shaped tube with a more or less horizontal wing.

== Description ==
Maireana turbinata is an openly branched, perennial shrub that typically grows up to 60 cm (24 in) high and has branchlets covered with white, woolly hairs. The leaves are arranged alternately, succulent and semiterete, 3–8 mm (0.12–0.31 in) long, with white, woolly hairs pressed against the surface. The flowers are bisexual and arranged singly with woolly lobes. The fruiting perianth is glabrous or with woolly lobes at the edges, golden brown when dry, with a top-shaped, smooth, glossy tube and a horizontal wing about 15–20 mm (0.59–0.79 in) in diameter.

== Taxonomy ==
Maireana turbinata was first formally described in 1975 by Paul Graham Wilson in the journal Nuytsia from specimens he collected 80 km (50 mi) south of Rawlinna on the Nullarbor Plain in 1968. The specific epithet (turbinata) means 'top-shaped', referring to the fruit.

== Distribution and habitat ==
Maireana turbinata is widespread in mainland Australia where it usually grows in heavier, often reddish soils. It occurs in central Queensland, western New South Wales, north-western Victoria, South Australia, south-eastern Western Australia and the south of the Northern Territory.
