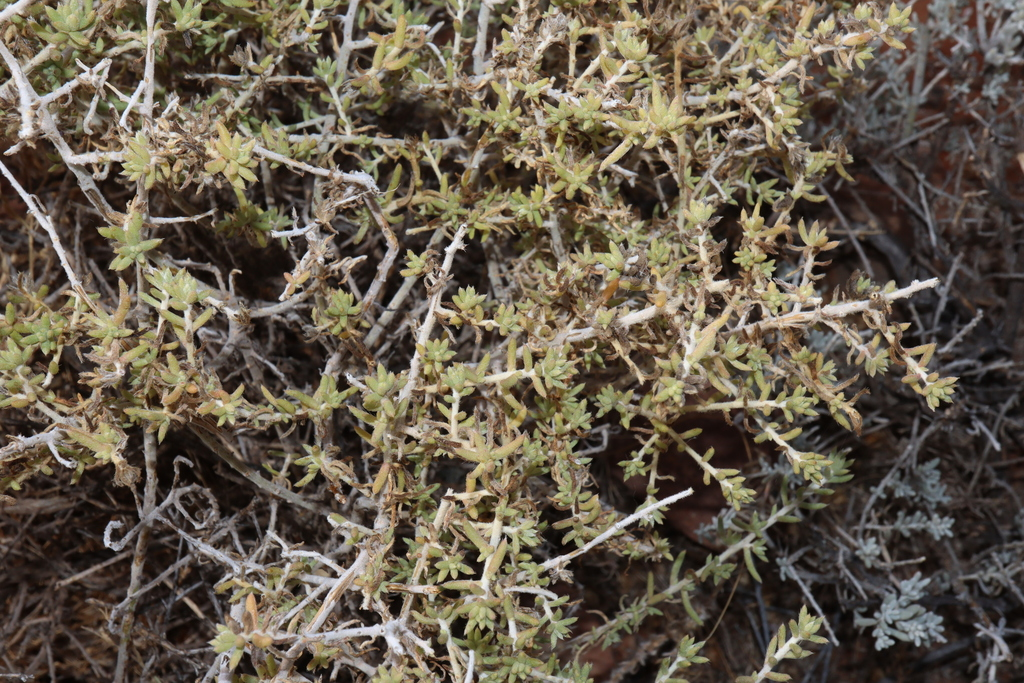
- In the Fowlers Gap Arid Zone Research Station

Scientific classification
- Kingdom: Plantae
- Clade: Tracheophytes
- Clade: Angiosperms
- Clade: Eudicots
- Order: Caryophyllales
- Family: Amaranthaceae
- Genus: Maireana
- Species: M. schistocarpa

Binomial name
- Maireana schistocarpa Paul G.Wilson

= Maireana schistocarpa =

Species of plant

Maireana schistocarpa, commonly known as split-fruit bluebush, is a species of flowering plant in the family Amaranthaceae and is endemic to arid areas of inland Australia. It is an erect, widely branched subshrub with its branchlets covered with woolly hairs, mostly unisexual flowers and a soft, easily crushed fruiting perianth with a broadly top-shaped tube and a papery wing.

== Description ==
Maireana schistocarpa is an erect, widely branched subshrub that typically grows to a height of 0.5–1 m (1 ft 8 in – 3 ft 3 in) and has thin branchlets densely covered with woolly hairs. Its leaves are slender, fleshy, more or less terete, 5–12 mm (0.20–0.47 in) long. The flowers are unisexual, arranged singly and densely covered with woolly hairs, the fruiting perianth is soft and straw-coloured when dry. The tube is broadly top-shaped, about 2 mm (0.079 in) high, thin-walled, easily crushed, with a vertical slit. The wing is papery, horizontal and 12–15 mm (0.47–0.59 in) in diameter.

== Taxonomy and naming ==
Maireana schistocarpa was first formally described in 1975 by Paul Graham Wilson in the journal Nuytsia from specimens collected on the Huckitta Cattle Station in 1956.

== Distribution and habitat ==
Split-fruit bluebush is found in south-western Queensland, north-western New South Wales, the south-east of the Northern Territory and north-eastern South Australia and occurs on gravelly rises, low hills and breakaways.
