= Maireana excavata =

Scientific classification
- Kingdom: Plantae
- Clade: Tracheophytes
- Clade: Angiosperms
- Clade: Eudicots
- Order: Caryophyllales
- Family: Amaranthaceae
- Genus: Maireana
- Species: M. excavata

Binomial name
- Maireana excavata (J.M.Black) Paul G.Wilson

Synonyms
- Kochia excavata J.M.Black; Kochia tomentosa var. humilis (Benth.) J.M.Black; Kochia villosa var. humilis Benth.

Species of plant in the amaranth family

Maireana excavata, the bottle bluebush, is a species of flowering plant in the family Amaranthaceae, native to southeastern Australia. A decumbent perennial with a substantial taproot, it is typically found growing in heavy soils.
