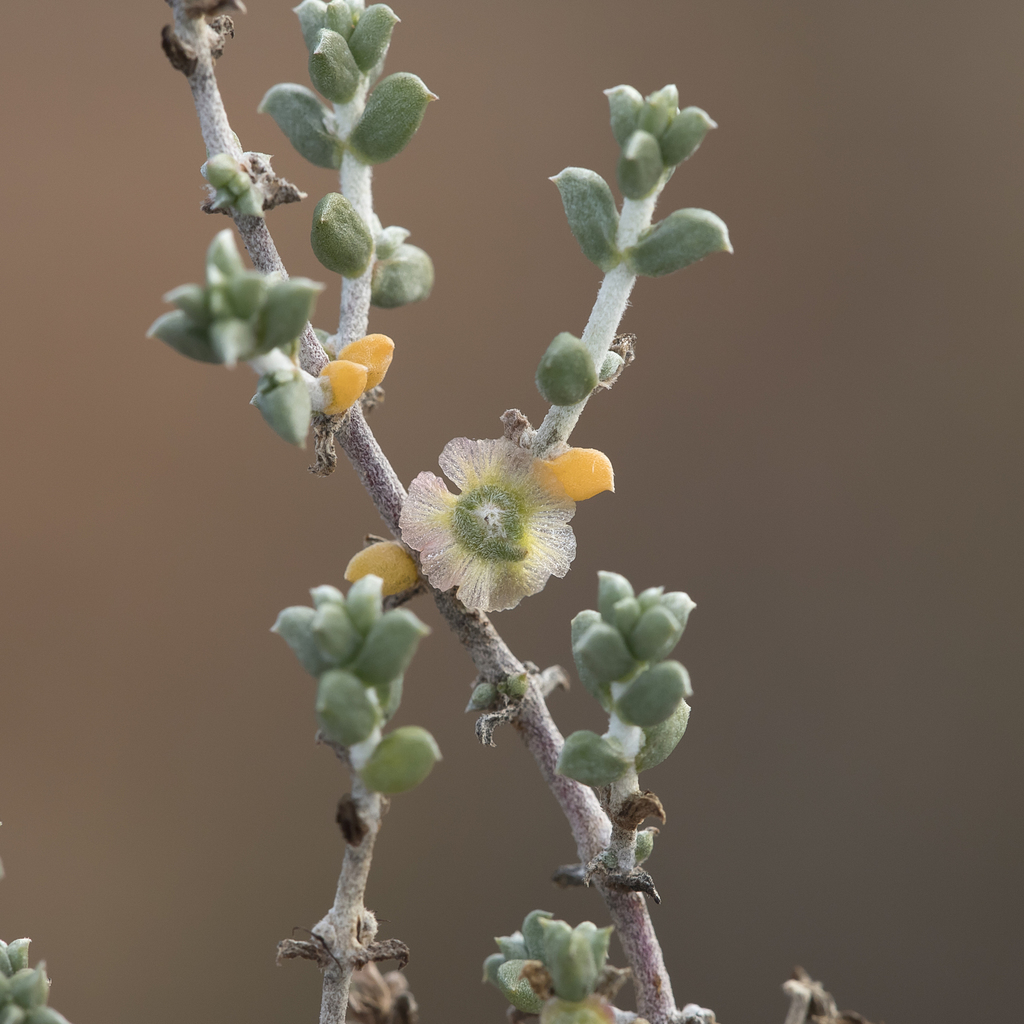

Scientific classification
- Kingdom: Plantae
- Clade: Tracheophytes
- Clade: Angiosperms
- Clade: Eudicots
- Order: Caryophyllales
- Family: Amaranthaceae
- Genus: Maireana
- Species: M. cannonii

Binomial name
- Maireana cannonii (J.M.Black) Paul G.Wilson

= Maireana cannonii =

Species of plant

Maireana cannonii, commonly known as Cannon's bluebush, is a species of flowering plant in the family Amaranthaceae and is endemic to South Australia. It is a small subshrub with many branches, sessile leaves arranged in opposite pairs, bisexual flowers arranged singly, and a crust-like, hemispherical fruiting perianth with a thin, horizontal wing.

== Description ==
Maireana cannonii is a small, spreading or erect grey shrub or subshrub, its branchlets covered with woolly hairs. The leaves are arranged in opposite pairs and sessile, more or less circular in cross section, 5–6 mm (0.20–0.24 in) long and covered with silky hairs. The flowers are bisexual, with a short, hemispherical tube, about 2.5 mm (0.098 in) in diameter, with a thin, circular wing about 6 mm (0.24 in) in diameter with a radial slit.

== Taxonomy and naming ==
This species was first formally described in 1919 by John McConnell Black who gave it the name Kochia cannonii in the Transactions and Proceedings of the Royal Society of South Australia, from specimens collected near Leigh Creek by William Austin Cannon in 1918. In 1975, Paul Wilson transferred the species to Maireana as M. cannonii in the journal Nuytsia.

== Distribution ==
Maireana cannonii is found between Port Pirie and Leigh Creek in South Australia.
