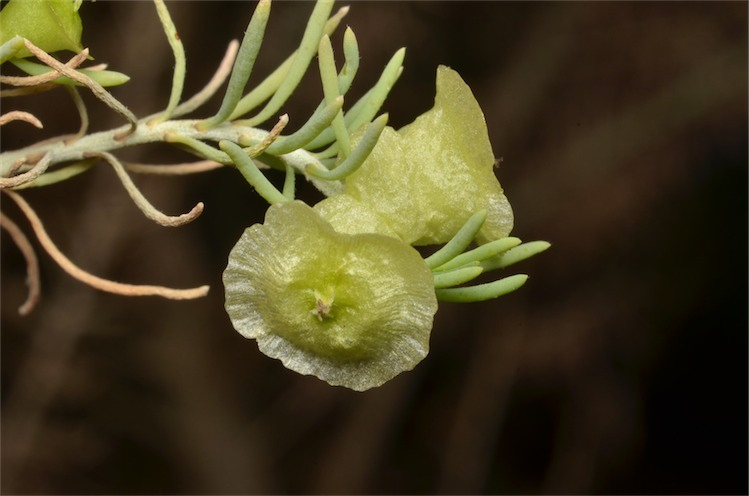

Scientific classification
- Kingdom: Plantae
- Clade: Tracheophytes
- Clade: Angiosperms
- Clade: Eudicots
- Order: Caryophyllales
- Family: Amaranthaceae
- Genus: Maireana
- Species: M. campanulata

Binomial name
- Maireana campanulata Paul G.Wilson

= Maireana campanulata =

Species of plant

Maireana campanulata, commonly known as bell-fruit bluebush, is a species of flowering plant in the family Amaranthaceae and is endemic to inland regions of Australia. It is a spreading or erect shrub or subshrub with linear to oblong leaves, bisexual flowers arranged singly, and a cup-shaped fruiting perianth with a thin, very narrow wing.

== Description ==
Maireana campanulata is a spreading or erected grey shrub or subshrub that typically grows up to 20–60 cm (7.9–23.6 in), with its branchlets covered with pale fawn-coloured, woolly hairs. The leaves are arranged alternately, fleshy, linear to oblong, 5–20 mm (0.20–0.79 in) long, 0.3–1 mm (0.012–0.039 in) wide, usually bluish or glaucous and finally glabrous. The flowers are bisexual, the fruiting perianth glabrous, the tube cup-shaped, about 6 mm (0.24 in) high and wide with a thin, very narrow wing about 10 mm (0.39 in) in diameter with no radial slit.

== Taxonomy and naming ==
Maireana campanulata was first formally described in 1975 by Paul Wilson in the journal Nuytsia from specimens collected 3 mi (4.8 km) west of the Santa Teresa Mission in the Northern Territory in 1956. The specific epithet (campanulata) means 'bell-shaped', referring to the shape of the fruit.

== Distribution and habitat ==
Maireana campanulata grows on rocky or gravelly hills, ranges and breakaways. It is found in the far north-west of New South Wales, northern South Australia, the Northern Territory and western Queensland.
