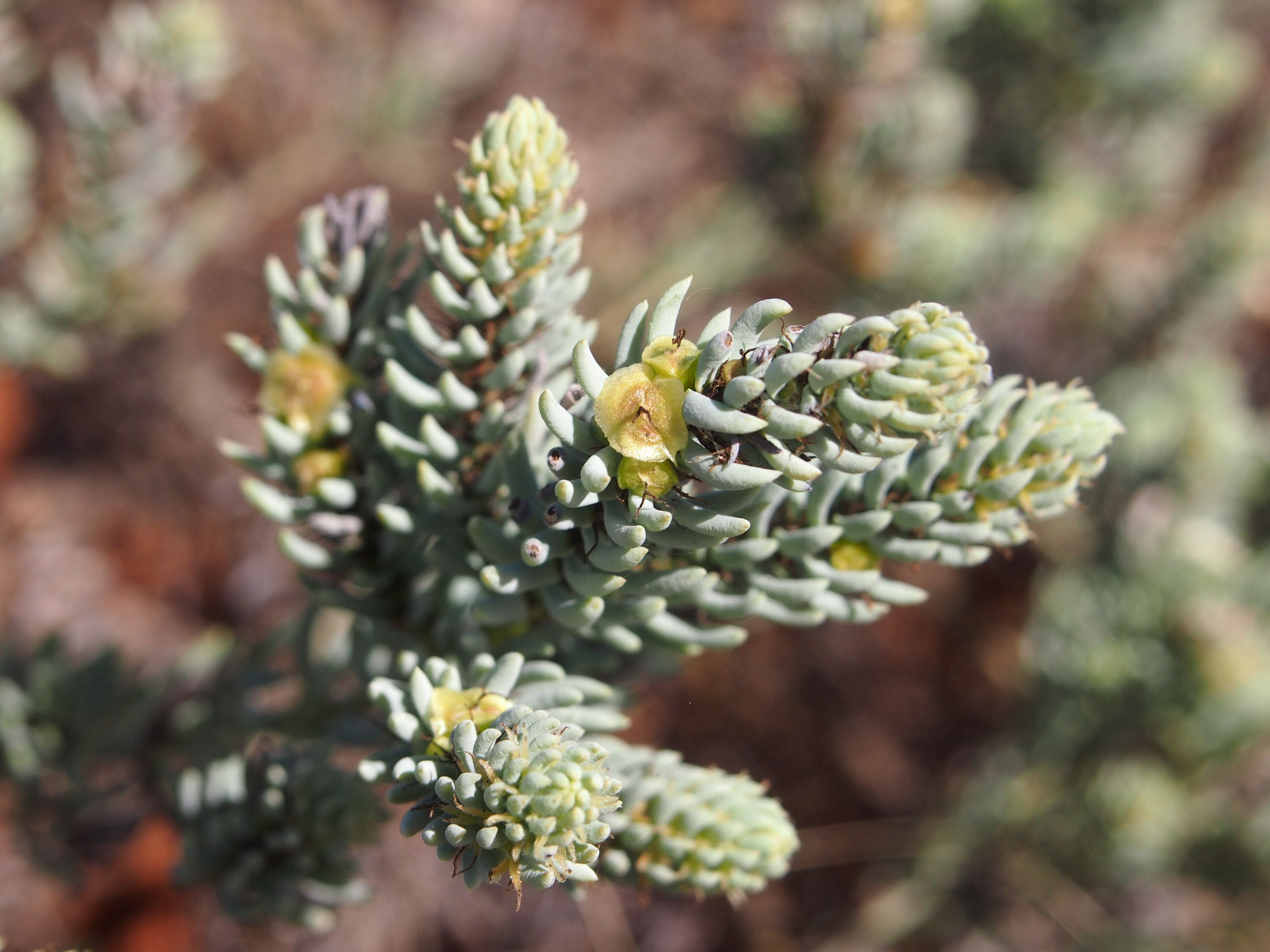

Scientific classification
- Kingdom: Plantae
- Clade: Tracheophytes
- Clade: Angiosperms
- Clade: Eudicots
- Order: Caryophyllales
- Family: Amaranthaceae
- Genus: Maireana
- Species: M. triptera

Binomial name
- Maireana triptera (Benth.) Paul G.Wilson

Synonyms
- Kochia triptera Benth. var. triptera; Kochia triptera Benth.

= Maireana triptera =

Species of plant

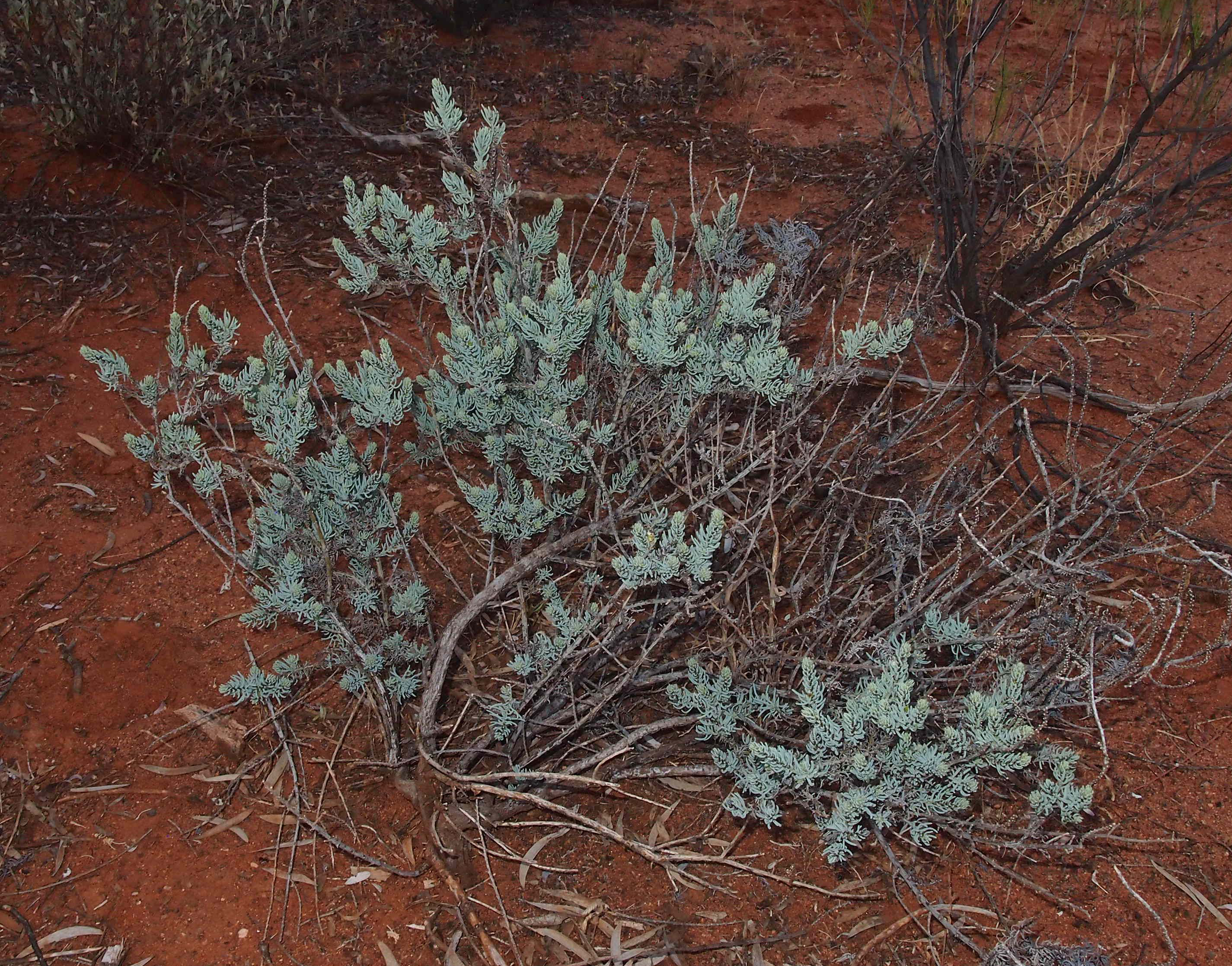
Habit

Maireana triptera, commonly known as three-wing bluebush, is a species of flowering plant in the family Amaranthaceae and is endemic to mainland Australia. It is a glaucous, compact perennial shrub with mostly glabrous branchlets, fleshy semiterete leaves, mostly bisexual flowers arranged singly, and a glabrous fruiting perianth with five vertical wings fused to a horizontal wing.

== Description ==
Maireana triptera is a glaucous, perennial shrub that typically grows up to 50 cm (20 in) high and is glabrous, apart from soft hairs in leaf axils. The leaves are arranged densely, alternate, fleshy, slender and semiterete, about 10 mm (0.39 in) long with a pointed end. The flowers are bisexual and arranged singly. The fruiting perianth is glabrous, glossy dark brown to black when dry, with a top-shaped, crusty tube and five papery vertical wings running the length of the tube and fused with a horizontal wing about 8 mm (0.31 in) in diameter.

== Taxonomy ==
This species was first formally described in 1870 by George Bentham, who gave it the name Kochia triptera in his Flora Australiensis. In 1975, Paul Graham Wilson transferred the species to the genus Maireana as Maireana triptera in the journal Nuytsia. The specific epithet (triptera) means 'three-winged'.

== Distribution and habitat ==
Maireana triptera is widespread in mainland Australia where it usually grows in sandy soils, often in mallee. It occurs in north-western Queensland, central and western New South Wales, north-western Victoria, South Australia, central Western Australia and south from Marble Bar in the Northern Territory.
