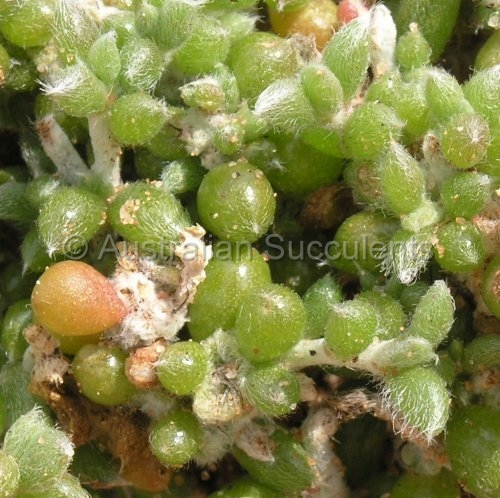

Scientific classification
- Kingdom: Plantae
- Clade: Tracheophytes
- Clade: Angiosperms
- Clade: Eudicots
- Order: Caryophyllales
- Family: Amaranthaceae
- Genus: Maireana
- Species: M. amoena

Binomial name
- Maireana amoena (Diels) Paul G.Wilson

Synonyms
- Kochia amoena Diels

= Maireana amoena =

Species of plant

Maireana amoena is a species of flowering plant in the family Amaranthaceae and is endemic to Western Australia. It is a small, brittle shrub with fleshy, spherical, oval or terete leaves, pairs of male and female flowers, and a hemispherical utricle with a short tube and horizontal wings.

== Description ==
Maireana amoena is a small, brittle shrub that typically grows to 10–40 cm (3.9–15.7 in) high, its young branchlets covered with woolly hairs. The leaves are succulent, spherical, oval or terete, 5–15 mm (0.20–0.59 in) long and glabrous or covered with silky hairs. The flowers are white and arranged in pairs of male and female flowers, densely covered with short hairs. The fruiting perianth is mostly glabrous with a short tube with a horizontal, fan-shaped wing 1.5–3 mm (0.059–0.118 in) long.

== Taxonomy ==
This species was first formally described in 1904 by Ludwig Diels who gave it the name Kochia amoena in Botanische Jahrbücher für Systematik, Pflanzengeschichte und Pflanzengeographie. In 1975, Paul Graham Wilson transferred the species to Maireana as M. amoena in the journal Nuytsia. The specific epithet (amoena) means 'charming' or 'showy'.

== Distribution and habitat ==
This species of Maireana is widespread in Western Australia where it usually grows on sandy rises near salt lakes from near Carnarvon to near Norseman.
