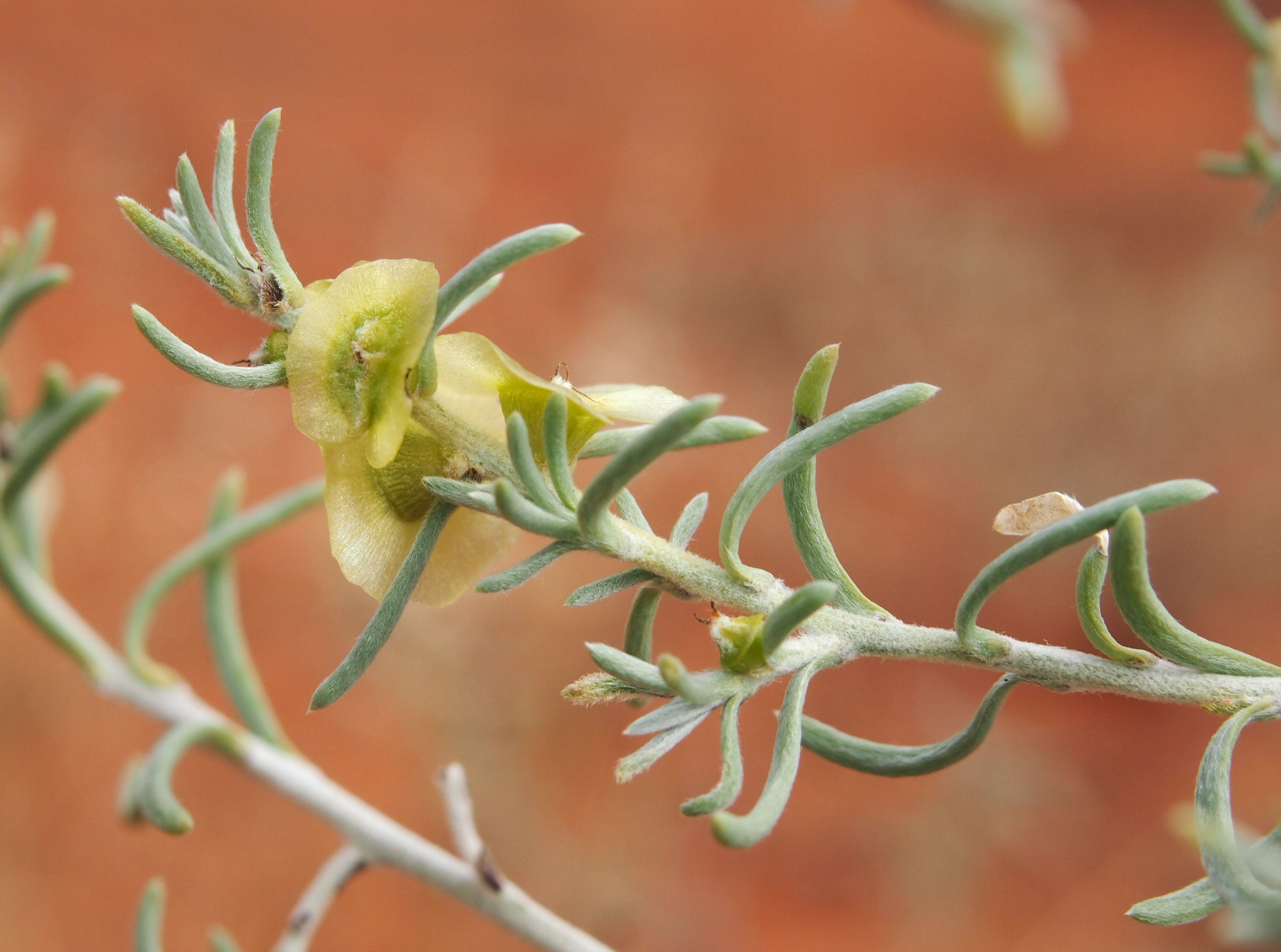

Scientific classification
- Kingdom: Plantae
- Clade: Tracheophytes
- Clade: Angiosperms
- Clade: Eudicots
- Order: Caryophyllales
- Family: Amaranthaceae
- Genus: Maireana
- Species: M. georgei

Binomial name
- Maireana georgei (Diels) Paul G.Wilson

Synonyms
- Kochia georgei Diels; Kochia stowardii S.Moore

= Maireana georgei =

Slit-wing bluebush

Species of plant

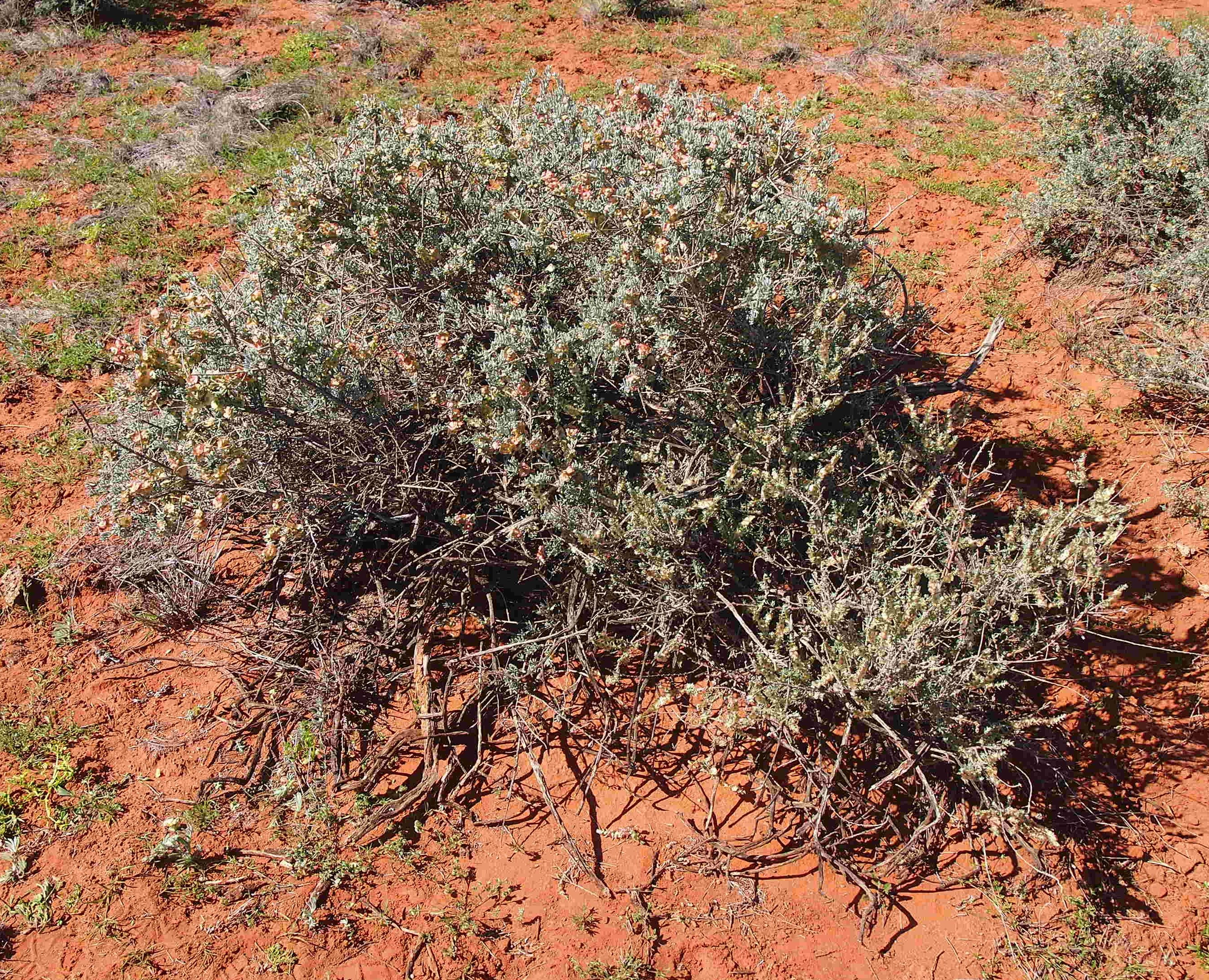
Habit

Maireana georgei, commonly known as slit-wing bluebush or satiny bluebush, is a flowering plant in the family Amaranthaceae and is endemic to Australia. It is a grey-green perennial shrub with woolly branches and small flowers.

== Description ==
Maireana georgei is an upright, open-branched shrub to about 80 cm (31 in) high with woolly, short, matted hairs. The leaves are arranged alternately, linear or slightly needle-shaped, 6–15 mm (0.24–0.59 in) long and succulent. Flowers are borne singly in leaf axils, small, pinkish or satiny brown, bisexual, fruiting perianth smooth, 14–20 mm (0.55–0.79 in) in diameter, slightly veined, tube top-shaped. Fruiting occurs from September to October.

== Taxonomy and naming ==
In 1904 Friedrich Ludwig Emil Diels gave it the name Kochia georgei. In 1975 Paul G. Wilson changed the name to Maireana georgei and the description was published in Nuytsia. The specific epithet (georgei) is in honor of William James George.

== Distribution and habitat ==
Slit-wing bluebush grows on sand, loams, clay and stony locations in all mainland states and the North Territory of Australia.
