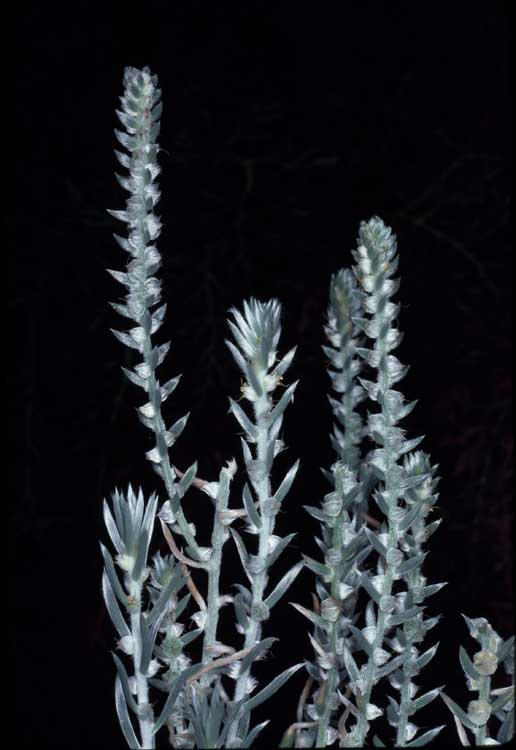

Scientific classification
- Kingdom: Plantae
- Clade: Embryophytes
- Clade: Tracheophytes
- Clade: Spermatophytes
- Clade: Angiosperms
- Clade: Eudicots
- Order: Caryophyllales
- Family: Amaranthaceae
- Genus: Maireana
- Species: M. ciliata

Binomial name
- Maireana ciliata (F.Muell.) Paul G.Wilson

Synonyms
- Kochia ciliata F.Muell.

= Maireana ciliata =

Species of plant in the amaranth family

Maireana ciliata, commonly known as fissure weed or hairy bluebush, is a species of flowering plant in the family Amaranthaceae and is endemic to Australia. It is a low-lying to erect perennial with woolly branches, narrowly oblong leaves, bisexual, densely hairy flowers arranged singly, and a hairy, lens-shaped, winged fruiting perianth.

== Description ==
Maireana ciliata is a low-lying to erect or spreading perennial plant that typically grows to a height of up to 15 cm (5.9 in) high with a woody base and thin, woolly branches. Its leaves are arranged alternately along the branches, linear to narrowly oblong, about 10 mm (0.39 in) long and covered with silky hairs. The flowers are bisexual and arranged singly or in leafy spikes, the fruiting perianth lens-shaped, about 3 mm (0.12 in) in diameter with 5 radial ridges, and covered with silky hairs. Flowering occurs from April to November.

== Taxonomy ==
This species was first formally described in 1858 by Ferdinand von Mueller who gave it the name Kochia ciliata in a Report on the Plants Collected During Mr. Babbage's Expedition into the North West Interior of South Australia in 1858 in the Victorian Government Parliamentary Papers. In 1975, Paul Wilson transferred the species to Maireana as M. ciliata, in the journal Nuytsia. The specific epithet (ciliata) means 'fringed with fine hairs'.

== Distribution and habitat ==
Maireana ciliata mainly grows on calcareous soils and is found in central and north-eastern South Australia, the south of the Northern Territory, far western New South Wales, far north-western Victoria and in Queensland. The species has been introduced to the Cape Provinces of South Africa.
