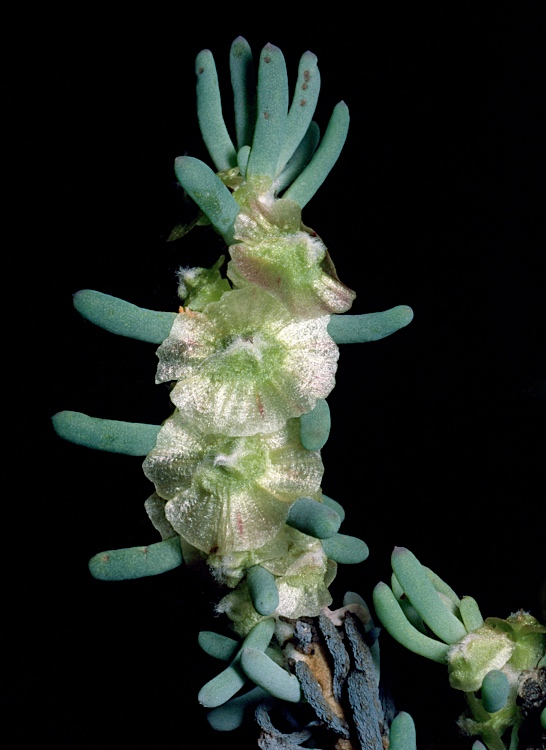

Scientific classification
- Kingdom: Plantae
- Clade: Tracheophytes
- Clade: Angiosperms
- Clade: Eudicots
- Order: Caryophyllales
- Family: Amaranthaceae
- Genus: Maireana
- Species: M. pentatropis

Binomial name
- Maireana pentatropis (Tate) Paul G.Wilson

= Maireana pentatropis =

Erect mallee bluebush

Species of plant

Maireana pentatropis commonly known as erect mallee bluebush,is a species of flowering plant in the family Amaranthaceae and is endemic to Australia. It is a small upright shrub with greyish woolly branches and fleshy leaves.

== Description ==
Maireana pentatropis is an upright, small perennial to 1.5 m (4 ft 11 in) high with ascending branches densely covered with white woolly hairs. The leaves are arranged alternately, almost terete, succulent, 7–15 mm (0.28–0.59 in) long, smooth and occasionally short and rounded. The bisexual flowers are borne singly in leaf axils, the fruiting perianth a glabrous, top-shaped tube, with 3-5 papery wings, and a flat, horizontal wing 12 mm (0.47 in) wide. Flowering occurs most of the year and the fruit becomes dark brown with age.

== Taxonomy and naming ==
This species was described in 1885 by Ralph Tate who gave it the name Kochia pentatropis and the description was published in the Transactions, proceedings and report, Royal Society of South Australia. In 1975 Paul G.Wilson changed the name to Maireana pentatropis, the name change and description was published in Nuytsia. The specific epithet (pentatropis) means 'five wings'.

== Distribution and habitat ==
Erect mallee bluebush grows on sandy soils, clay, low lying areas and mostly in mallee communities in New South Wales, Victoria, South Australia, Western Australia and the Northern Territory.
