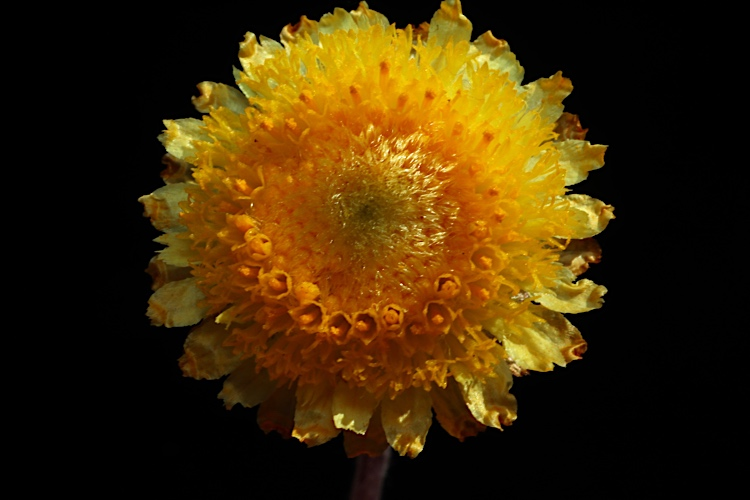

Scientific classification
- Kingdom: Plantae
- Clade: Tracheophytes
- Clade: Angiosperms
- Clade: Eudicots
- Clade: Asterids
- Order: Asterales
- Family: Asteraceae
- Genus: Coronidium
- Species: C. gunnianum

Binomial name
- Coronidium gunnianum (Hook.) N.G.Walsh

Synonyms
- List: Coronidium sp. Lowland Swamps (V.Stajsic 4226) Vic. Herbarium; Gnaphalium gunnianum (Hook.) Sch.Bip.; Helichrysum aff. rutidolepis (Lowland Swamps); Helichrysum erosum Schltdl.; Helichrysum gunnianum Hook.; Helichrysum rutidolepis auct. non DC.: Black, J.M. (1929); Helichrysum rutidolepis auct. non DC.: Haegi, L.A.R. in Jessop, J.P. & Toelken, H.R. (ed.) (1986); Helichrysum rutidolepis auct. non DC.: Society for Growing Australian Plants Maroondah, Inc. (1991); Helichrysum rutidolepis auct. non DC.: Jeanes, J.A. in Walsh, N.G. & Entwisle, T.J. (ed.) (1999); Helichrysum rutidolepis auct. non DC.: Jones, D.L. & Jones, B. (1999); Helichrysum scorpioides auct. non Labill.: Curtis, W.M. (1963); Leptorhynchos linearis auct. non Less.: Jessop, J.P. in Jessop, J.P. (ed.)

= Coronidium gunnianum =

Species of flowering plant

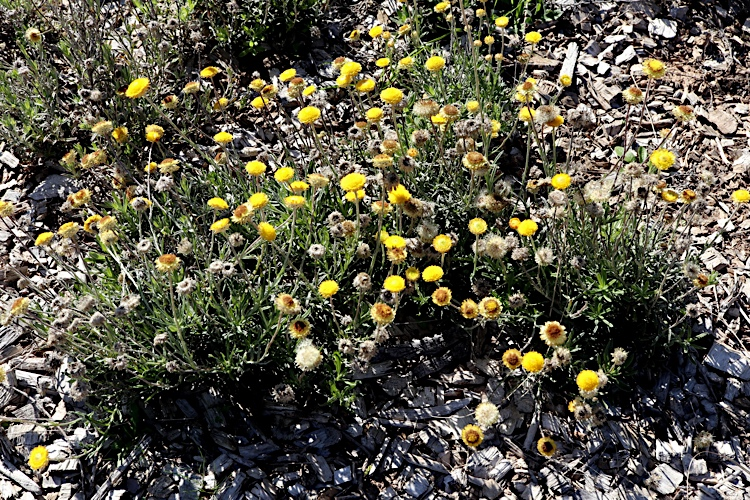
Habit in the National Arboretum Canberra

Coronidium gunnianum, commonly known as pale swamp everlasting, pale everlasting or Gunn's everlasting is a species of flowering plant in the family Asteraceae and is endemic to south-eastern Australia. It is an erect perennial, with linear to lance-shaped leaves with the narrower end towards the base, and solitary heads of pale yellow to brownish yellow daisy-like flowers.

== Description ==
Coronidium gunnianum is an erect, rhizomatous perennial that typically grows to a height of 50 cm (20 in) with few branches, and stems covered in cottony hairs pressed against the surface. Its leaves are linear to lance-shaped with the narrower end towards the base, mostly 15–65 mm (0.59–2.56 in) long and 1–9 mm (0.039–0.354 in) wide, the upper surface glabrous or with cottony hairs, the lower surface obscured by cottony hairs pressed against the surface and many sessile glands. The heads of daisy-like flower are solitary, more or less spherical to depressed top-shaped, 10–25 mm (0.39–0.98 in) in diameter, with five to eight rows of pale yellow to brownish yellow involucral bracts. There are many florets, some outer ones female. Flowering mainly occurs from November to April, and the cypselas are 1.3–1.9 mm (0.051–0.075 in) long, glabrous, ridged and brown with 15 to 30 pappus bristles 3–4.5 mm (0.12–0.18 in) long.

== Taxonomy ==
This species was first described in 1841 by William Jackson Hooker who gave it the name Helichrysum gunnianum in his Icones Plantarum from specimens collected in Tasmania by Ronald Campbell Gunn. In 2014, Neville Grant Walsh transferred the species to Coronidium as C. gunnianum in the journal Muelleria. The specific epithet (gunnianum) honours Ronald Gunn, who collected the type specimen.

== Distribution and habitat ==
Pale swamp everlasting occurs on the coast and tablelands of New South Wales, the Australian Capital Territory, through most of Victoria apart from the north west and alpine and adjacent mountain areas, the Flinders Lofty Block and Kanmantoo bioregions of South Australia and in Tasmania where it is rare. It mainly grows in grasslands and Eucalyptus camaldulensis woodlands on soils that are prone to inundation, usually under 100 m (330 ft) above mean sea level.
