= Coronidium densifolium =

Scientific classification
- Kingdom: Plantae
- Clade: Tracheophytes
- Clade: Angiosperms
- Clade: Eudicots
- Clade: Asterids
- Order: Asterales
- Family: Asteraceae
- Genus: Coronidium
- Species: C. densifolium

Binomial name
- Coronidium densifolium Paul G.Wilson

Species of flowering plant

Coronidium densifolium, commonly known as dense everlasting, is a species of flowering plant in the family Asteraceae and is endemic to South Australia. It is ascending to erect perennial herb with woolly stems hidden by the leaves, lance-shaped leaves and heads of pale yellow to brownish flowers.

== Description ==
Coronidium densifolium is an ascending to erect, rhizomatous perennial herb that typically grows to a height of up to about 12 cm (4.7 in) with densely woolly stems that are mostly hidden by the leaves. Its leaves are lance-shaped, sometimes with the narrower end towards the base, 15–30 mm (0.59–1.18 in) long and 3–6 mm (0.12–0.24 in) wide. The flowers are borne in sessile, more or less hemispherical heads 10–15 mm (0.39–0.59 in) in diameter on a peduncle 1.5–2 mm (0.059–0.079 in) long. The bracts are pale yellow to brownish yellow, in five to eight rows. The cypselas are narrowly cylindrical, 1.5 mm (0.059 in) long.

== Taxonomy ==
Coronidium densifolium was first described in 2014 by Neville Grant Walsh from an unpublished manuscript by John McConnell Black in the journal Muelleria from specimens collected in the Black Swamp, (about 25 km (16 mi) north-north-east of Victor Harbour on the railway) in 1968. The specific epithet (densifolium) was "used by J.M. Black on the two collections made before his death in 1951".

== Distribution and habitat ==
No extant populations of dense everlasting are known, but the species probably occurred with Melaleuca uncinata in mallee, open woodland and heath in the Flinders Lofty Block and Kanmantoo bioregions of south-eastern South Australia.
