= Leioproctus castaneigaster =

Scientific classification
- Kingdom: Animalia
- Phylum: Arthropoda
- Clade: Pancrustacea
- Class: Insecta
- Order: Hymenoptera
- Family: Colletidae
- Genus: Leioproctus
- Species: L. castaneigaster

Binomial name
- Leioproctus castaneigaster Batley, 2025

Species of bee

Leioproctus castaneigaster, or Leioproctus (Leioproctus) castaneigaster, is a species of bee in the family Colletidae and subfamily Colletinae. It is endemic to Australia. It was described by entomologist Michael Batley in 2025.

== Etymology ==
The specific epithet castaneigaster (Latin: "chestnut belly") refers to metasomal colouration.

== Description ==
The holotype male body length is 7.8 mm, head width 2.5 mm; female body length 9.7 mm, head width 3.0 mm. Integumental colouration is mainly black with brown markings, the metasoma partly chestnut-brown, especially on females. The hair is mostly brown.

== Distribution and habitat ==
The species occurs in eastern New South Wales. The type locality is Cunnawarra National Park. It has also been recorded from Clarence and Dorrigo National Park.

== Behaviour ==
The adults are flying mellivores. Flowering plants visited by the bees include Coronidium elatum, Leucopogon affinis and Boronia microphylla.

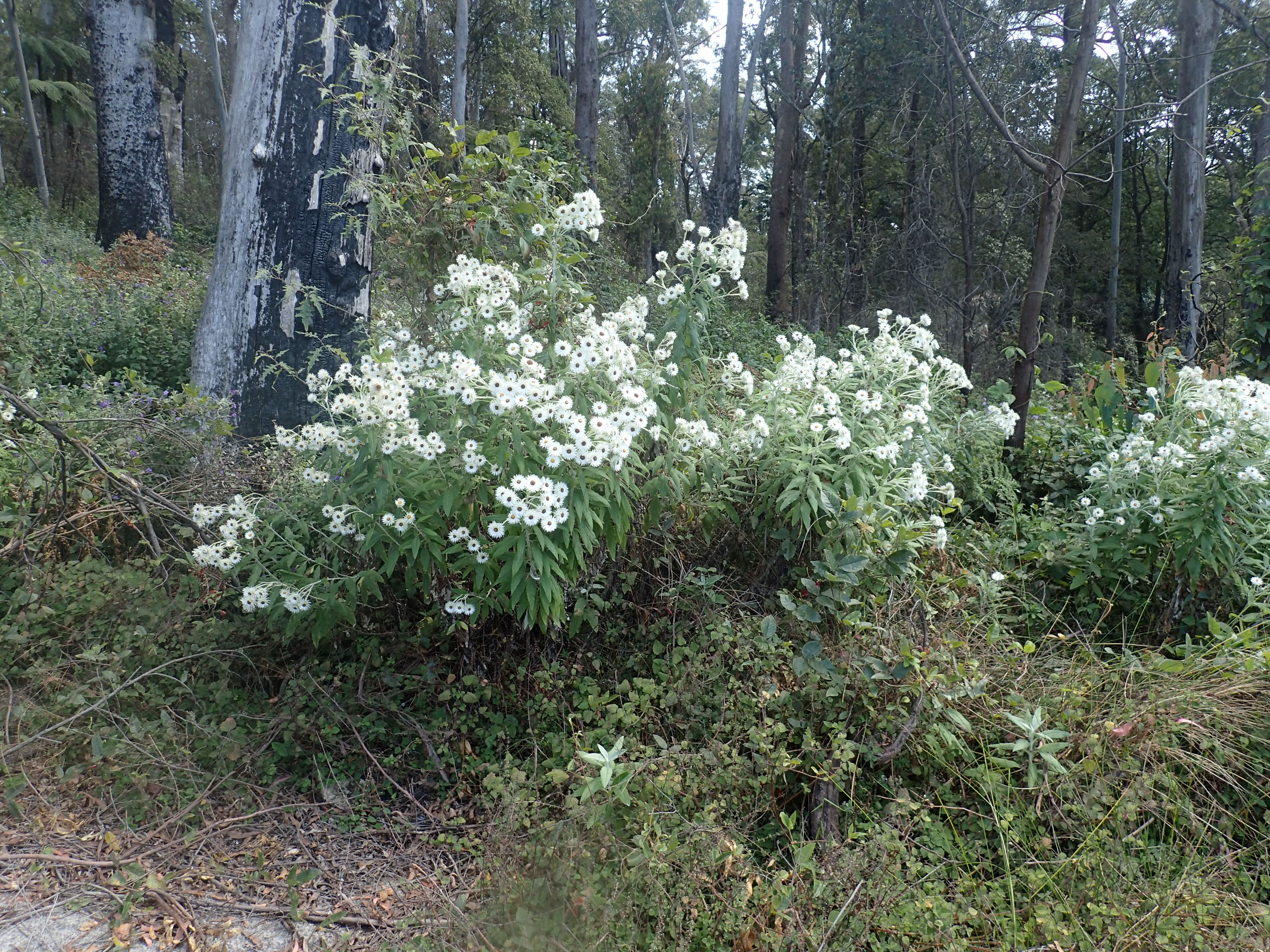
Coronidium elatum (tall everlasting), a forage plant of the bees

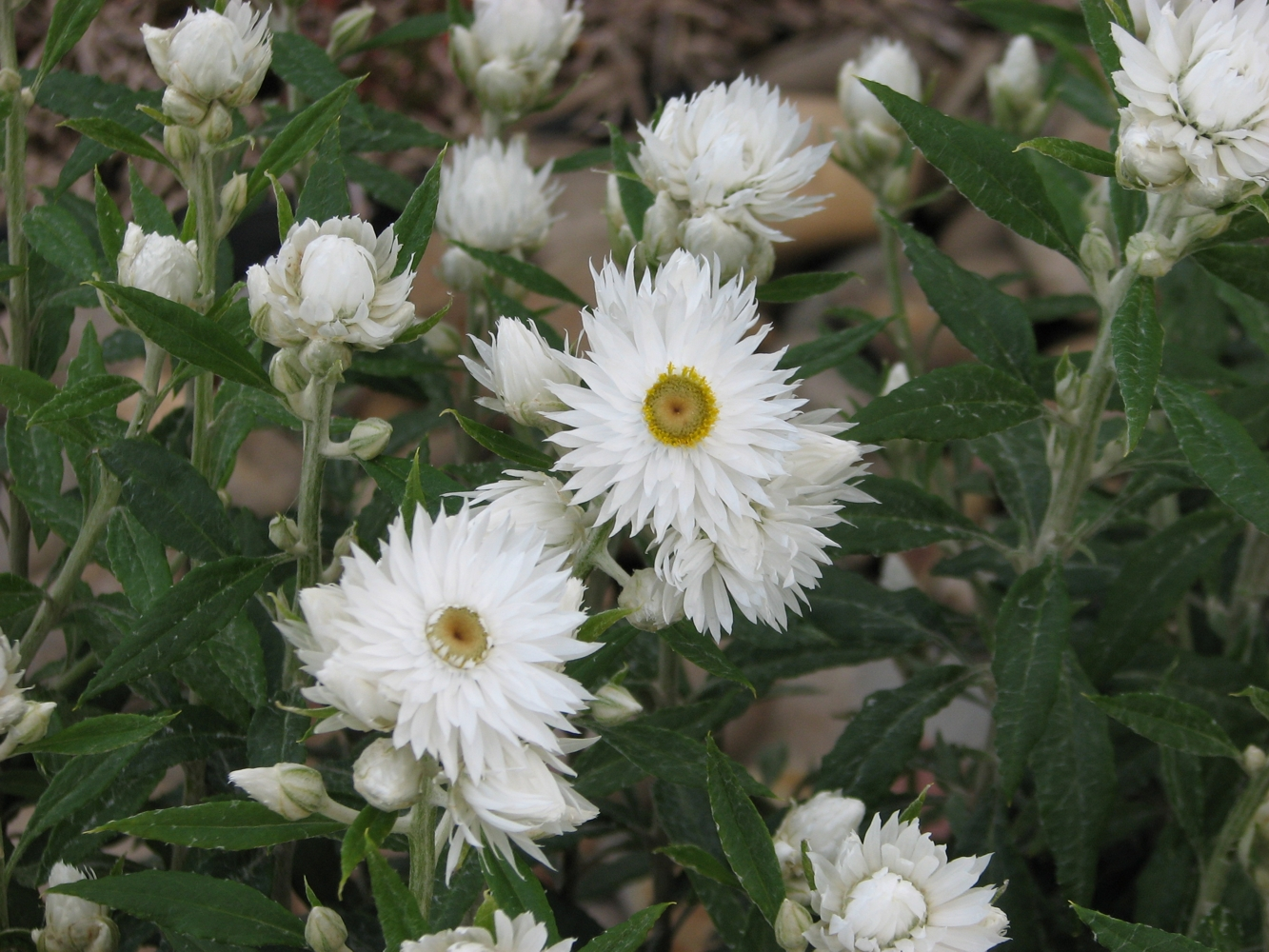
Flowers of Coronidium elatum
