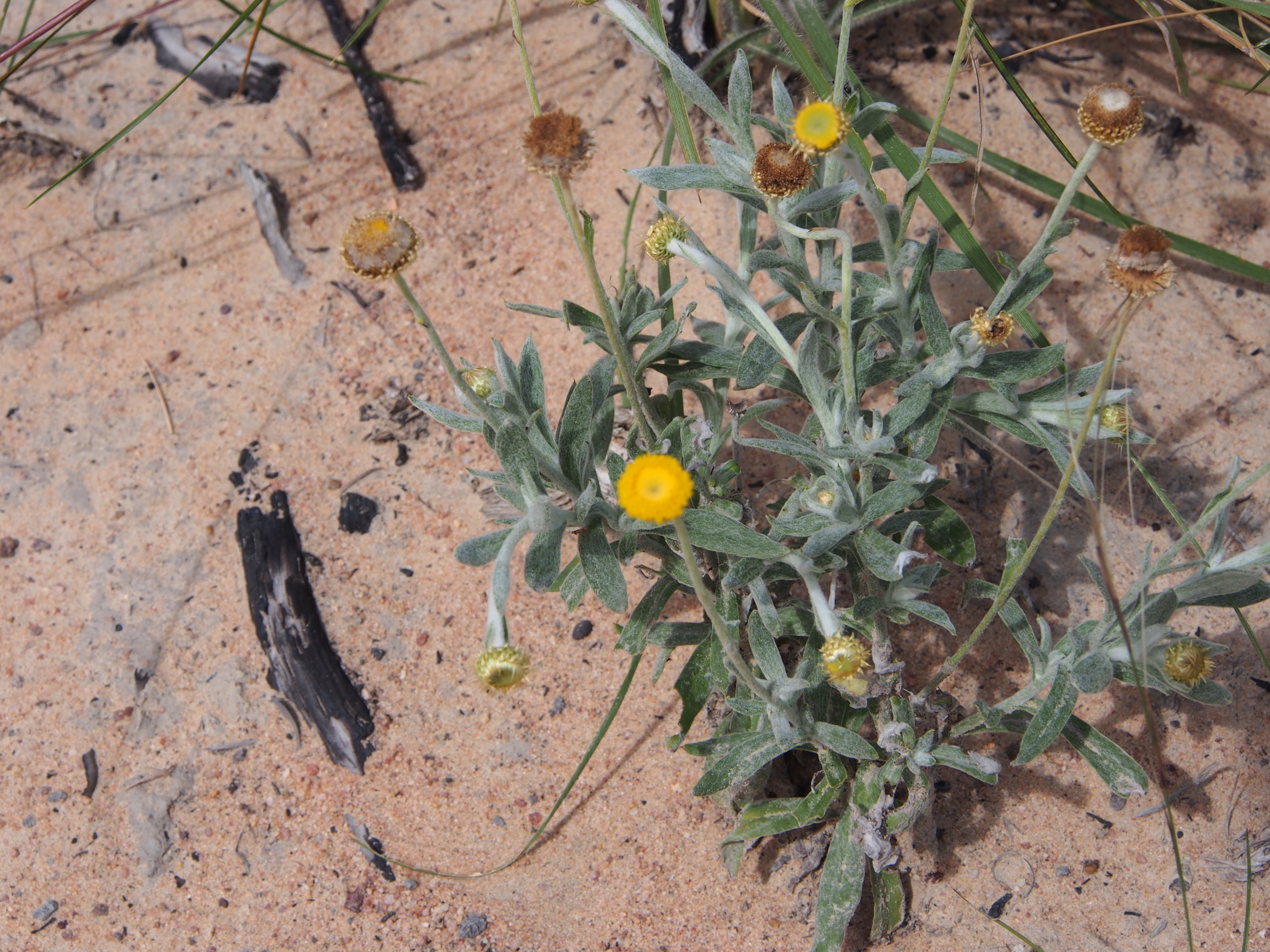
- Near White Mountains National Park

Scientific classification
- Kingdom: Plantae
- Clade: Tracheophytes
- Clade: Angiosperms
- Clade: Eudicots
- Clade: Asterids
- Order: Asterales
- Family: Asteraceae
- Genus: Coronidium
- Species: C. lanosum

Binomial name
- Coronidium lanosum Paul G.Wilson

= Coronidium lanosum =

Species of flowering plant

Coronidium lanosum is a species of flowering plant in the family Asteraceae and is endemic to Queensland, Australia. It is a short-lived perennial herb with densely woolly, narrowly elliptic to elliptic or egg-shaped leaves, heads of yellow flowers and cypselas with thread-like pappus bristles.

== Description ==
Coronidium lanosum is a short-lived perennial plant that typically grows to a height of 40 cm (16 in) and has slender branches covered with woolly hairs. Its leaves are densely woolly, narrowly elliptic to elliptic or egg-shaped with the narrower end towards the base, 20–40 mm (0.79–1.57 in) long. The flowers are borne in heads 15 mm (0.59 in) in diameter with compact yellow, glabrous involucral bracts, the outer bracts glossy, about 3 mm (0.12 in) long. The cypselas are brown, about 1.3 mm (0.051 in) long and the pappus has thread-like bristles joined at the base.

== Taxonomy ==
Coronidium lanosum was first described in 2008 by Paul Graham Wilson in the journal Nuytsia from specimens collected on Mount King, about 96 km (60 mi) north-north-east of Hughenden. The specific epithet (lanosum) refers to the woolly hairs on the branches and leaves.

== Distribution and habitat ==
This species of everlasting is found in north-central Queensland, where it is recorded as growing on volcanic rock in open woodland.
