= Coronidium adenophorum =

Scientific classification
- Kingdom: Plantae
- Clade: Tracheophytes
- Clade: Angiosperms
- Clade: Eudicots
- Clade: Asterids
- Order: Asterales
- Family: Asteraceae
- Genus: Coronidium
- Species: C. adenophorum

Binomial name
- Coronidium adenophorum (F.Muell.) Paul G. Wilson

Synonyms
- Helichrysum adenophorum F.Muell.; Helichrysum adenophorum F.Muell. var. adenophorum

Species of flowering plant

Coronidium adenophorum, commonly known as branched everlasting, is a flowering plant in the family Asteraceae. It is an erect, single-stemmed, annual or biennial herb with sessile linear leaves, solitary heads of white flowers and is endemic to the south-east of mainland Australia.

== Description ==
Coronidium adenophorum is an erect, single-stemmed annual or biennial herb that typically grows to a height of 50 cm (20 in) and has stems covered with glandular hairs. Its leaves are sessile, linear, 60 mm (2.4 in) long and covered with glandular hairs. The flowers are borne in a hemispherical head 45 mm (1.8 in) in diameter with white involucral bracts at the base, the outer bracts are sessile, the intermediate bracts narrowly oblong and the innermost bracts are shorter and prominently covered with soft hairs. Flowering occurs between October and March, and the cypselas are about 1.5 mm (0.059 in) long with thread-like pappus bristles.

== Taxonomy ==
This species was first described in 1855 by Ferdinand von Mueller who gave it the name Helichrysum adenophorum in the Transactions and Proceedings of the Victorian Institute for the Advancement of Science, from specimens collected amongst rocks on the south coast of Kangaroo Island. In 2008, Paul Graham Wilson transferred the species to Coronidium as C. adenophorum in the journal Nuytsia. The specific epithet (adenophorum) means 'to bear or produce glands".

== Distribution and habitat ==
Branched everlasting is found on Kangaroo Island, in the Murray–Darling basin and the south-east of South Australia, in dune mallee in the Big Desert south of Murrayville and in heathy woodland on Mt Abrupt in the Grampians.

== Conservation status ==
Coronidium adenophorum is listed as "endangered" under the Victorian Government Flora and Fauna Guarantee Act 1988.
