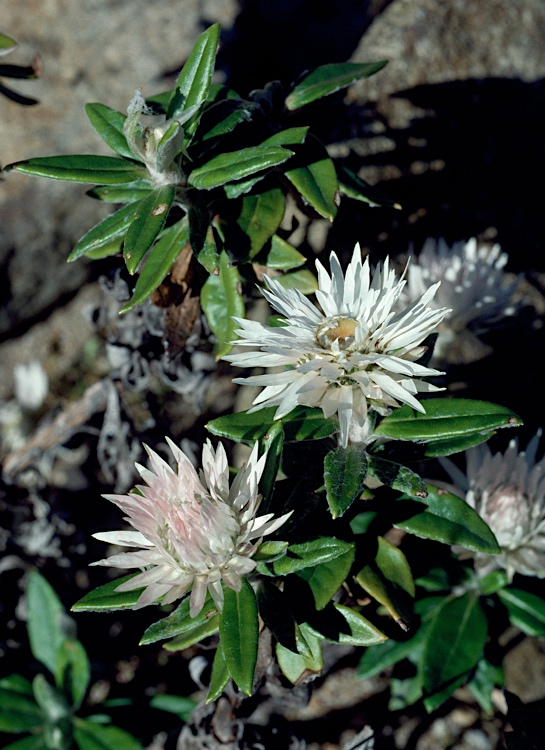
- In the Australian National Botanic Gardens

Scientific classification
- Kingdom: Plantae
- Clade: Tracheophytes
- Clade: Angiosperms
- Clade: Eudicots
- Clade: Asterids
- Order: Asterales
- Family: Asteraceae
- Genus: Coronidium
- Species: C. lindsayanum

Binomial name
- Coronidium lindsayanum (Domin) Paul G. Wilson

Synonyms
- Helichrysum elatum var. fraseri Benth. p.p.; Helichrysum lindsayanum Domin

= Coronidium lindsayanum =

Species of flowering plant

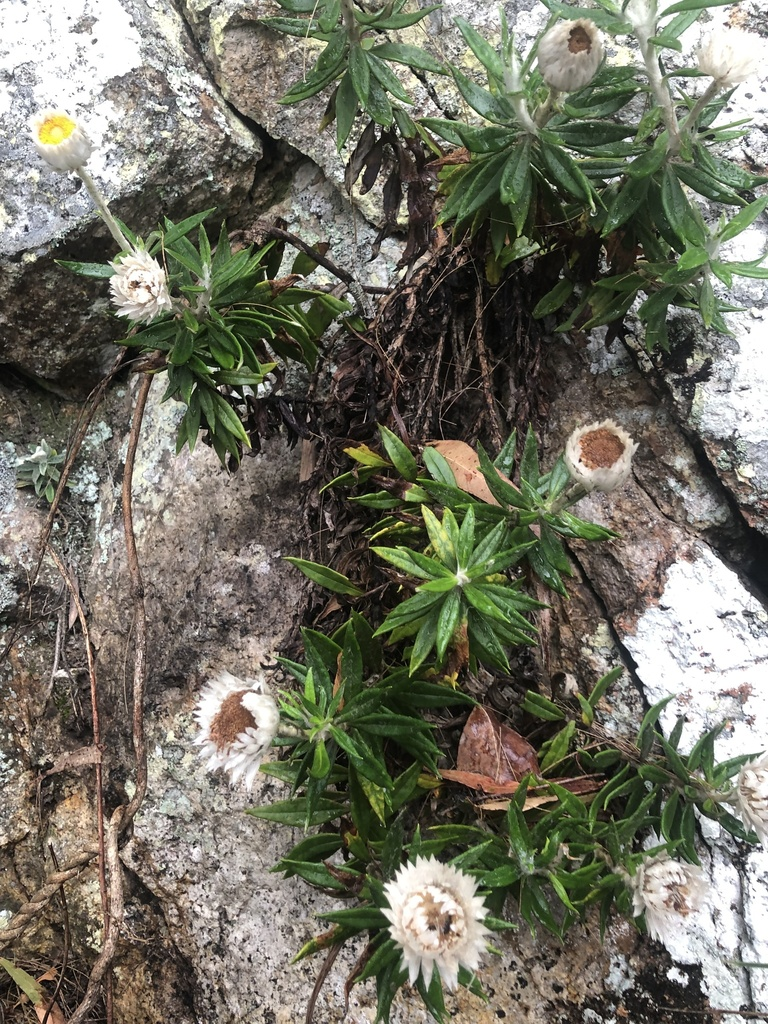
Habit near Mount Maroon in Mount Barney National Park

Coronidium lindsayanum is a species of flowering plant in the family Asteraceae and is endemic to an area near the border between New South Wales and Queensland, Australia. It is a low, compact shrub with crowded, narrowly elliptic to elliptic leaves, heads of flowers with white or pale pink bracts, and cypselas with thread-like pappus bristles.

== Description ==
Coronidium lindsayanum is a low, compact shrub with branches densely covered with woolly hairs. The leaves are crowded, narrowly elliptic to elliptic, 50 mm (2.0 in) long on a short petiole, and usually with the edges turned down. The upper surface of the leaves is glabrous and glossy, the lower surface is covered with felty hairs. The heads are hemispherical, more or less sessile, 40 mm (1.6 in) in diameter and arranged singly with white or pale pink very narrowly oblong involucral bracts covered with woolly hairs at the base. The cypselas are pale brown and crusty, about 2.2 mm (0.087 in) long and the pappus has thread-like bristles joined at the base.

== Taxonomy ==
This species was first formally described in 1930 by Karel Domin who gave it the name Helichrysum lindsayanum in Bibliotheca Botanica from specimens collected "on the rocks, 5,000 ft (1,500 m)" in 1829 by Charles Fraser. In 2008, Paul Graham Wilson transferred the species to Coronidium as C. lindsayanum. The specific epithet (lindsayanum) refers to Mount Lindesay, now known as Mount Barney .

== Distribution and habitat ==
This species of Coronidium grows in the crevices of rocky outcrops in the McPherson Range near the border of New South Wales and Queensland.

== Conservation status ==
Coronidium lindsayanum is listed as "least concern" under the Queensland Nature Conservation Act 1992.
