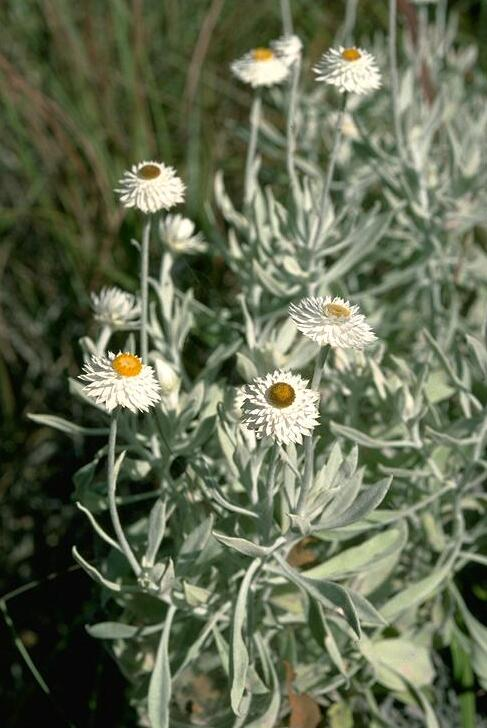
- Near Einasleigh

Conservation status
- Least Concern (NCA)

Scientific classification
- Kingdom: Plantae
- Clade: Embryophytes
- Clade: Tracheophytes
- Clade: Spermatophytes
- Clade: Angiosperms
- Clade: Eudicots
- Clade: Asterids
- Order: Asterales
- Family: Asteraceae
- Genus: Coronidium
- Species: C. newcastlianum

Binomial name
- Coronidium newcastlianum (Domin) Paul G. Wilson

Synonyms
- Helichrysum newcastlianum Domin; Helichrysum sp. (Stannary Hills J.R.Clarkson+ 2519)

= Coronidium newcastlianum =

Species of flowering plant

Coronidium newcastlianum is a species of flowering plant in the family Asteraceae and is endemic to Queensland, Australia. It is an erect, perennial herb with lance-shaped or egg-shaped stem leaves with the narrower end towards the base and covered with felt-like leaves, heads of flowers with white or pale pink bracts, and cylindrical to oblong cypselas with a persistent pappus.

== Description ==
Coronidium newcastlianum is an erect perennial herb that typically grows to a height of 60 cm (24 in) and has slender branches densely covered with woolly or felt-like hairs. The stem leaves are sometimes sessile, with narrowly oblong to lance-shaped or egg-shaped with the narrower end towards the base, 30–80 mm (1.2–3.1 in) long, 10–20 mm (0.39–0.79 in) wide and densely covered with woolly hairs. The heads are arranged singly on the ends of branched flowering stems, 40–50 mm (1.6–2.0 in) in diameter with white or pink involucral bracts about 5 mm (0.20 in) long. The cypselas are about 1.3 mm (0.051 in) long and the pappus has thread-like bristles joined at the base.

== Taxonomy ==
This species was first formally described in 1930 by Karel Domin who gave it the name Helichrysum newcastlianum in Bibliotheca Botanica from specimens collected "on the rocky summit of the Newcastle Range". In 2008, Paul Graham Wilson transferred the species to Coronidium as C. newcastlianum.

== Distribution and habitat ==
Coronidium newcastlianum is found along the Great Dividing Range in the Einasleigh Uplands bioregions of Queensland where it grows in eucalypt woodlands on rocky hills.

== Conservation status ==
Coronidium newcastlianum is listed as of "least concern" under the Queensland Government Nature Conservation Act 1992.
