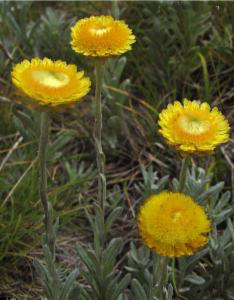

Scientific classification
- Kingdom: Plantae
- Clade: Tracheophytes
- Clade: Angiosperms
- Clade: Eudicots
- Clade: Asterids
- Order: Asterales
- Family: Asteraceae
- Genus: Coronidium
- Species: C. monticola

Binomial name
- Coronidium monticola N.G.Walsh

= Coronidium monticola =

Mountain coronidium

Species of flowering plant

Coronidium monticola, commonly known as the mountain coronidium, is a flowering plant in the family Asteraceae and grows in open forests in eastern Australia. It has woolly, grey-green leaves and mostly yellow flowers.

== Description ==
Coronidium monticola is an ascending to upright perennial to about 35 cm (14 in) high and often multi-branched from the base and sometimes a single stem. The leaves are grey-green, egg-shaped to oblong lance-shaped, sessile, 20–50 mm (0.79–1.97 in) long, 3–12 mm (0.12–0.47 in) wide, narrowing at the base, apex rounded or acute and ending with a sharp, short point 0.5–1 mm (0.020–0.039 in) long. The leaf upper surface is smooth with sparse or thickly woolly and lower surface similar with several glands and edges recurved. The single flower heads are 18–30 mm (0.71–1.18 in) in diameter, involucre bracts in rows of 7–10, bright yellow to orange, some oblong-lance shaped to spoon-shaped, florets including corolla 4–5.5 mm (0.16–0.22 in) long. Flowering occurs form January to April and the fruit is a narrowly cylindrical achene, grey or brown, ridged, smooth and 2–2.5 mm (0.079–0.098 in) long.

== Taxonomy and naming ==
Coronidium monticola was first formally described in 2014 by Neville Grant Walsh and the description was published in Muelleria. The specific epithet (monticola) means "mountain dweller".

== Distribution and habitat ==
Mountain coronidium grows at higher altitudes in montane forests, subalpine woodland and herb fields on soils that are rocky and usually well-drained in New South Wales, Victoria and the Australian Capital Territory.
