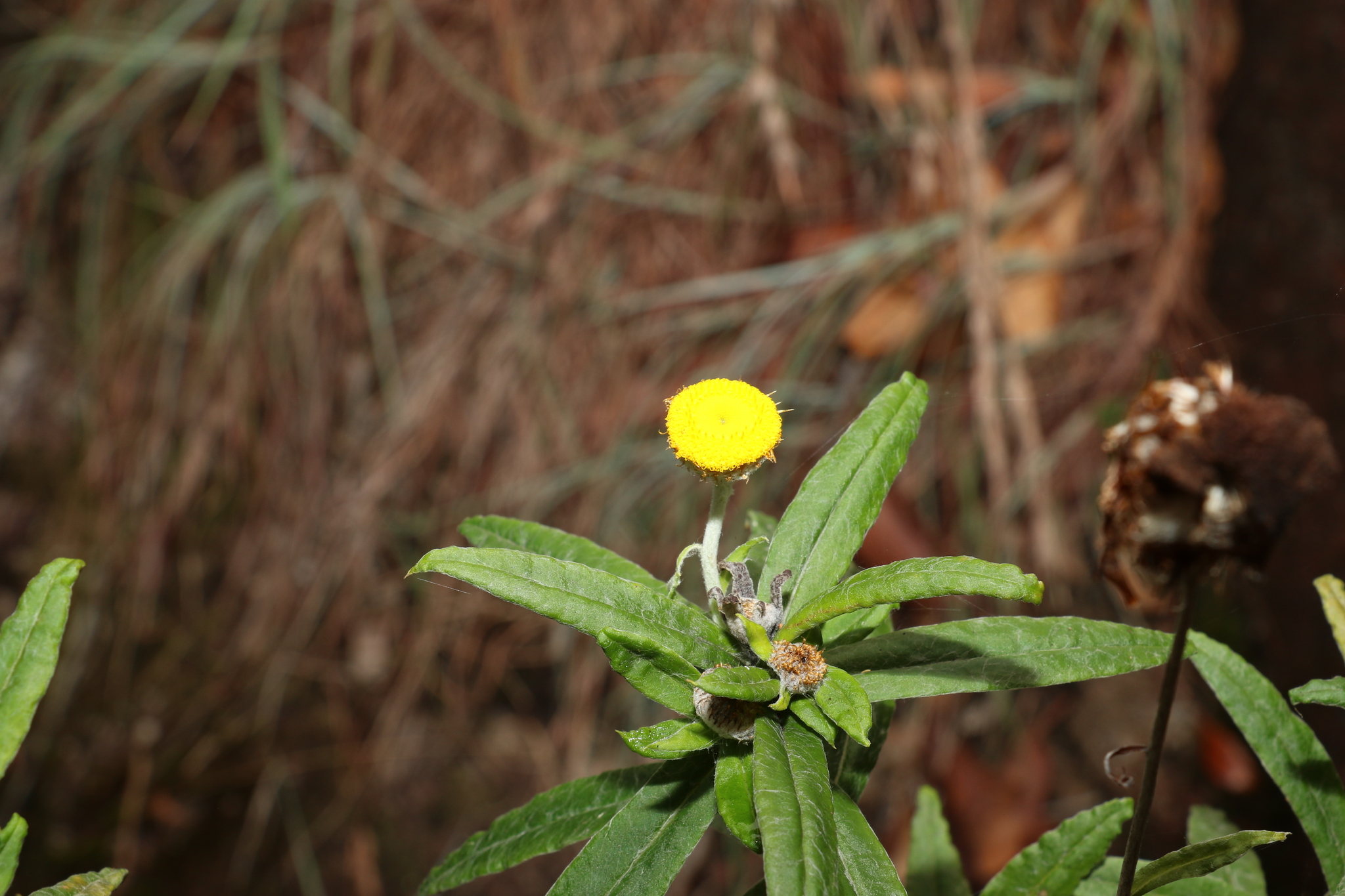

Conservation status
- Least Concern (NCA)

Scientific classification
- Kingdom: Plantae
- Clade: Tracheophytes
- Clade: Angiosperms
- Clade: Eudicots
- Clade: Asterids
- Order: Asterales
- Family: Asteraceae
- Genus: Coronidium
- Species: C. rupicola

Binomial name
- Coronidium rupicola (DC.) Paul G. Wilson

Synonyms
- Gnaphalium endeavourense Sch.Bip.; Gnaphalium rupicola (DC.) Sch.Bip.; Helichrysum collinum DC.; Helichrysum rupicola DC.; Helichrysum rupicola var. danesii Domin; Helichrysum rupicola DC. var. rupicola

= Coronidium rupicola =

Yellow button

Species of flowering plant

Coronidium rupicola, commonly known as yellow button, is a species of flowering plant in the family Asteraceae and is endemic to Queensland, Australia. It is a small, upright, perennial herb with lance-shaped stem leaves, heads of yellow flowers with bronze-coloured bracts, and cylindrical to oblong cypselas with thread-like pappus bristles.

== Description ==
Coronidium rupicola is a small, shrubby, erect perennial herb with a single stem and terminal yellow button flower-heads about 2 cm (0.79 in) in diameter. Unlike other species of Coronidium it doesn't have conspicuous, large bracts, instead a ring of smaller, narrow bronze-coloured bracts. The florets are thickly crowded with a greenish centre. The flowers in bud are thickly covered with long, whitish hairs, new growth stems silvery and woolly. The leaves are narrow, lanceolate, 5 cm (2.0 in) long, pale green, densely woolly underneath, upper surface smooth, margins rolled under and wavy. Flowering occurs throughout the year and the fruit is a cylindrical to oblong cypsela with thread-like pappus bristles.

== Taxonomy ==
This species was first described in 1838 by Augustin Pyramus de Candolle who gave it the name Helichrysum rupicola in his Prodromus Systematis Naturalis Regni Vegetabilis. In 2008, Paul Graham Wilson transferred the species to Coronidium as C. rupicola in the journal Nuytsia. The specific epithet (rupicola) is derived from the Latin words rūpēs meaning "cliff", and -cola meaning "to inhabit", and is a reference to the habitat where this species is found.

== Distribution and habitat ==
Yellow button is endemic to Queensland and grows on rocky coastlines, road verges, woodland and exposed ridges.

== Conservation status ==
Coronidium rupicola is listed as of "least concern" under the Queensland Government Nature Conservation Act 1992.
