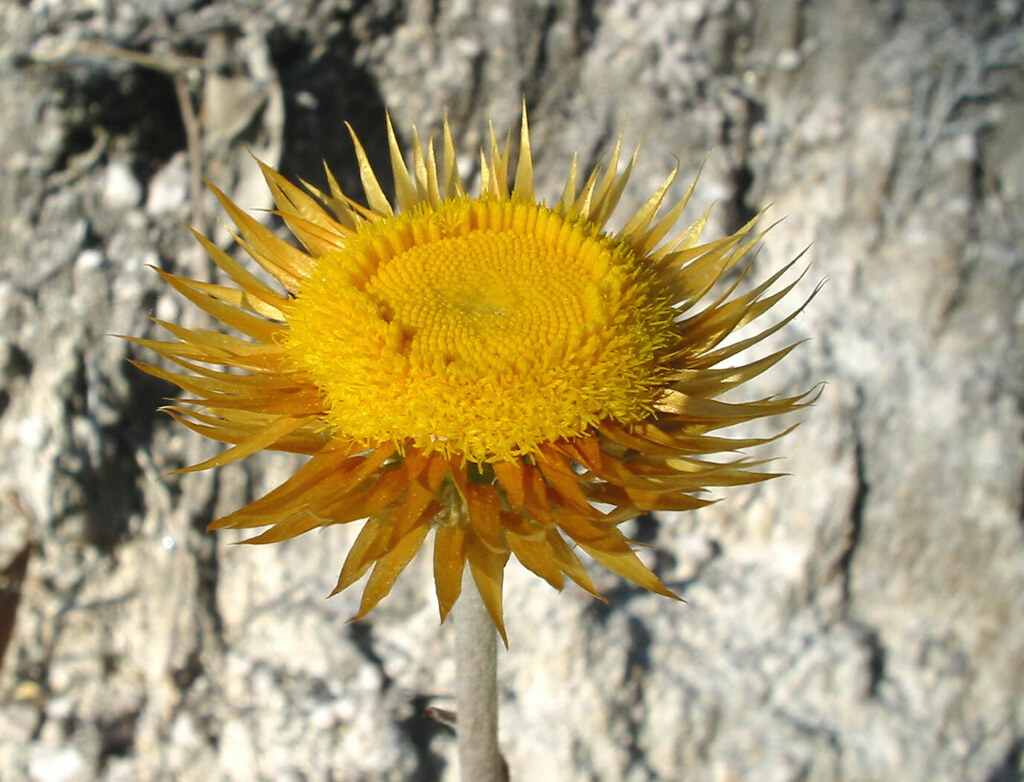
- Near Torrington

Scientific classification
- Kingdom: Plantae
- Clade: Embryophytes
- Clade: Tracheophytes
- Clade: Spermatophytes
- Clade: Angiosperms
- Clade: Eudicots
- Clade: Asterids
- Order: Asterales
- Family: Asteraceae
- Genus: Coronidium
- Species: C. oxylepis

Binomial name
- Coronidium oxylepis (F.Muell.) Paul G. Wilson

Synonyms
- Helichrysum collinum var. oxylepis (F.Muell.) Maiden & Betche; Helichrysum oxylepis F.Muell.; Helichrysum collinum auct. non DC.: Bentham, G. (5 January 1867) p.p.; Helichrysum collinum auct. non DC.: Everett, J. in Harden, G.J.

= Coronidium oxylepis =

Species of flowering plant

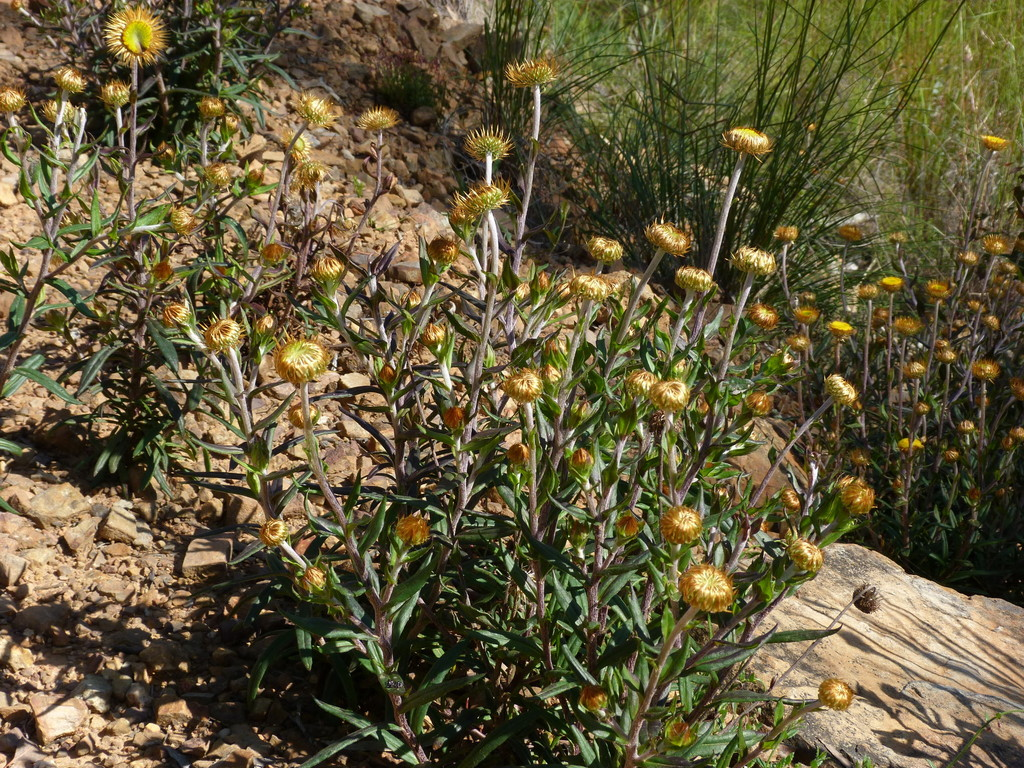
Habit on Black Mountain in the A.C.T.

Coronidium oxylepis is a species of flowering plant in the family Asteraceae and is endemic to eastern Australia. It is a perennial herb with linear to egg-shaped leaves with the narrower end towards the base, heads of flowers with membranous, yellow to straw-coloured bracts, and brown achenes with thread-like pappus bristles.

== Description ==
Coronidium oxylepis is a perennial herb that typically grows to a height of 60 cm (24 in) and usually has woolly branches. The leaves are papery to somewhat fleshy, linear to egg-shaped with the narrower end towards the base, up to 70 mm (2.8 in) long and sessile or with a narrowly wedge-shaped base. The upper surface of the leaves is more or less glabrous and the lower surface is densely covered with cottony hairs or glabrous. The heads are hemispherical, about 30 mm (1.2 in) in diameter and arranged singly with membranous, yellow to straw-coloured involucral bracts. The achenes are brown, about 1.3 mm (0.051 in) long and the pappus has thread-like bristles, fused at the base but readily break above the base.

== Taxonomy ==
This species was first formally described in 1858 by Ferdinand von Mueller who gave it the name Helichrysum oxylepis in his Fragmenta Phytographiae Australiae from specimens collected on Moreton Island. In 2008, Paul Graham Wilson transferred the species to Coronidium as C. oxylepis in the journal Nuytsia. The specific epithet (oxylepis) means 'sharp scale'.

In the same edition of "Nuytsia", Wilson described three subspecies of Coronidium oxylepis, and the names are accepted by the Australian Plant Census:

- Coronidium oxylepis subsp. carnosum Paul G.Wilson has stems that are glabrous or minutely covered with glandular hairs, and succulent to more or less glabrous, narrowly egg-shaped to egg-shaped leaves with the narrower end towards the base.
- Coronidium oxylepis subsp. lanatum Paul G.Wilson has woolly stems, at least towards the tips, and narrowly egg-shaped to egg-shaped leaves with the narrower end towards the base and covered with cottony to woolly hairs.
- Coronidium oxylepis (F.Muell.) Paul G.Wilson subsp. oxylepis has woolly stems, at least towards the tips, and sessile, narrowly oblong leaves covered with cottony to woolly hairs.

== Distribution and habitat ==
Coronidium oxylepis grows in deep sand on the coast or on a range of substrates inland is south-east Queensland and eastern New South Wales. Subspecies carnosum grows in deep sand, often on dunes, between Noosa and K'gari and is restricted to the south-east of Queensland.

== Conservation status ==
Coronidium oxylepis and all three subspecies are listed as of "least concern" under the Queensland Government Nature Conservation Act 1992.

== Gallery ==
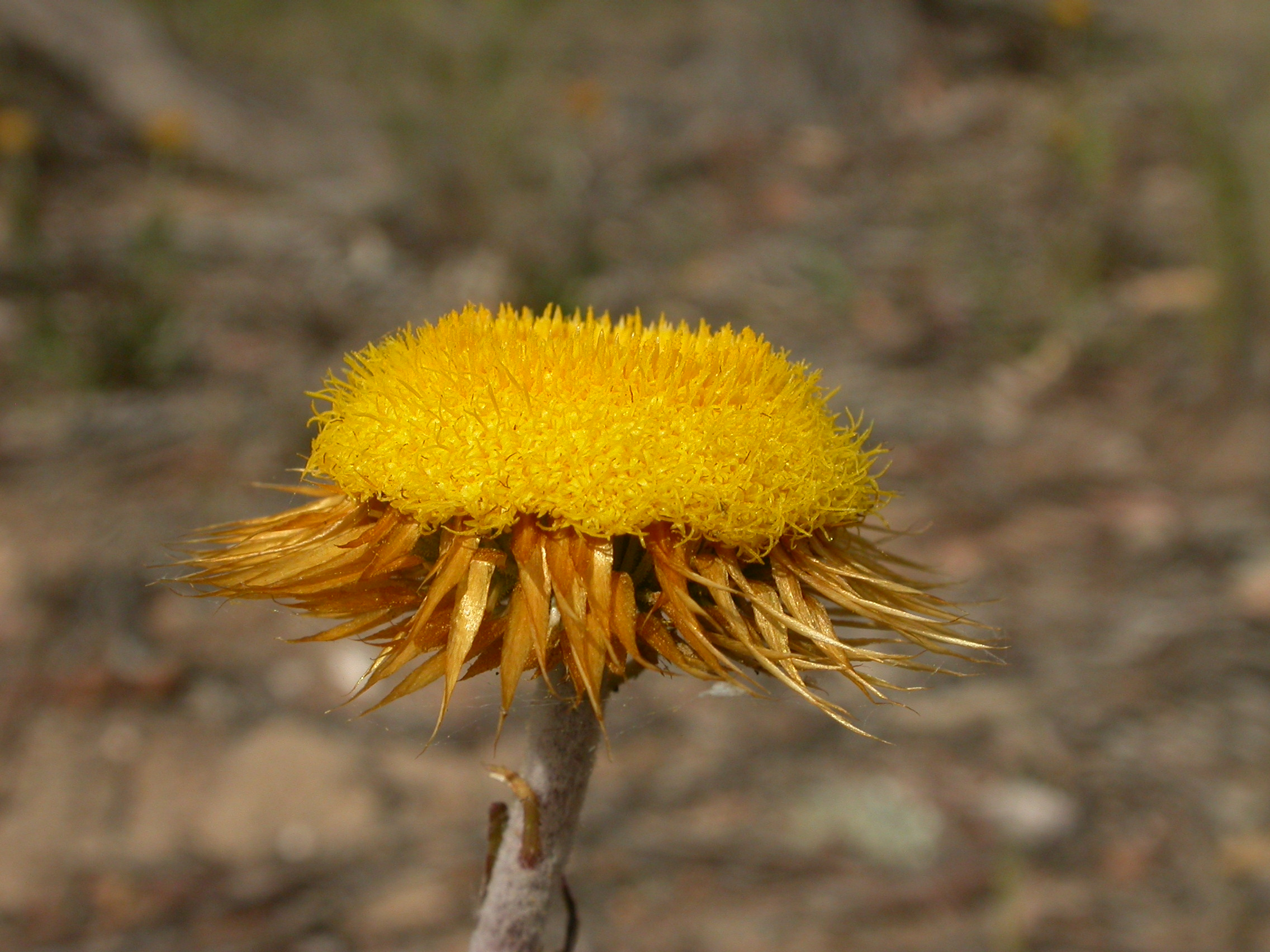

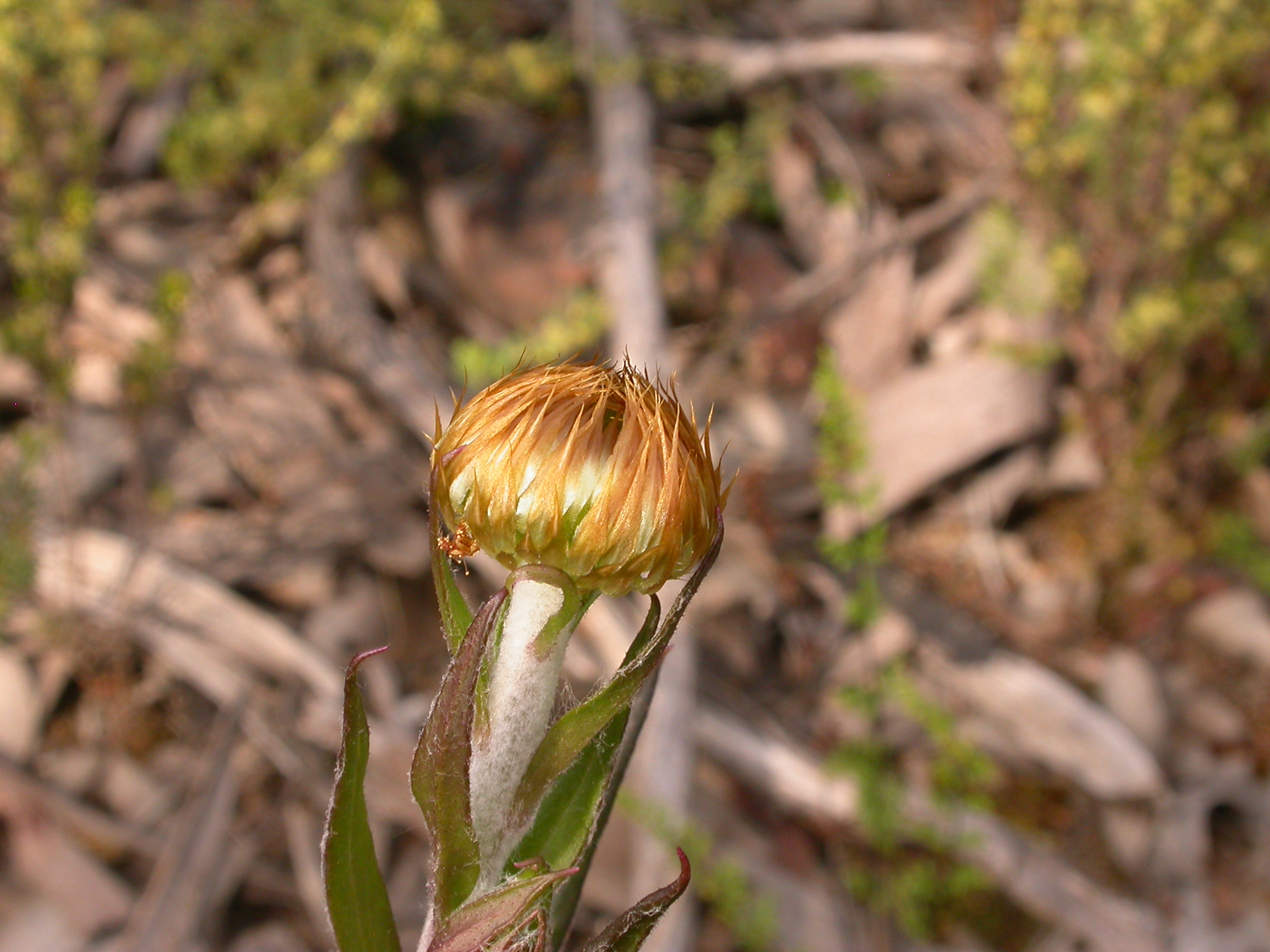

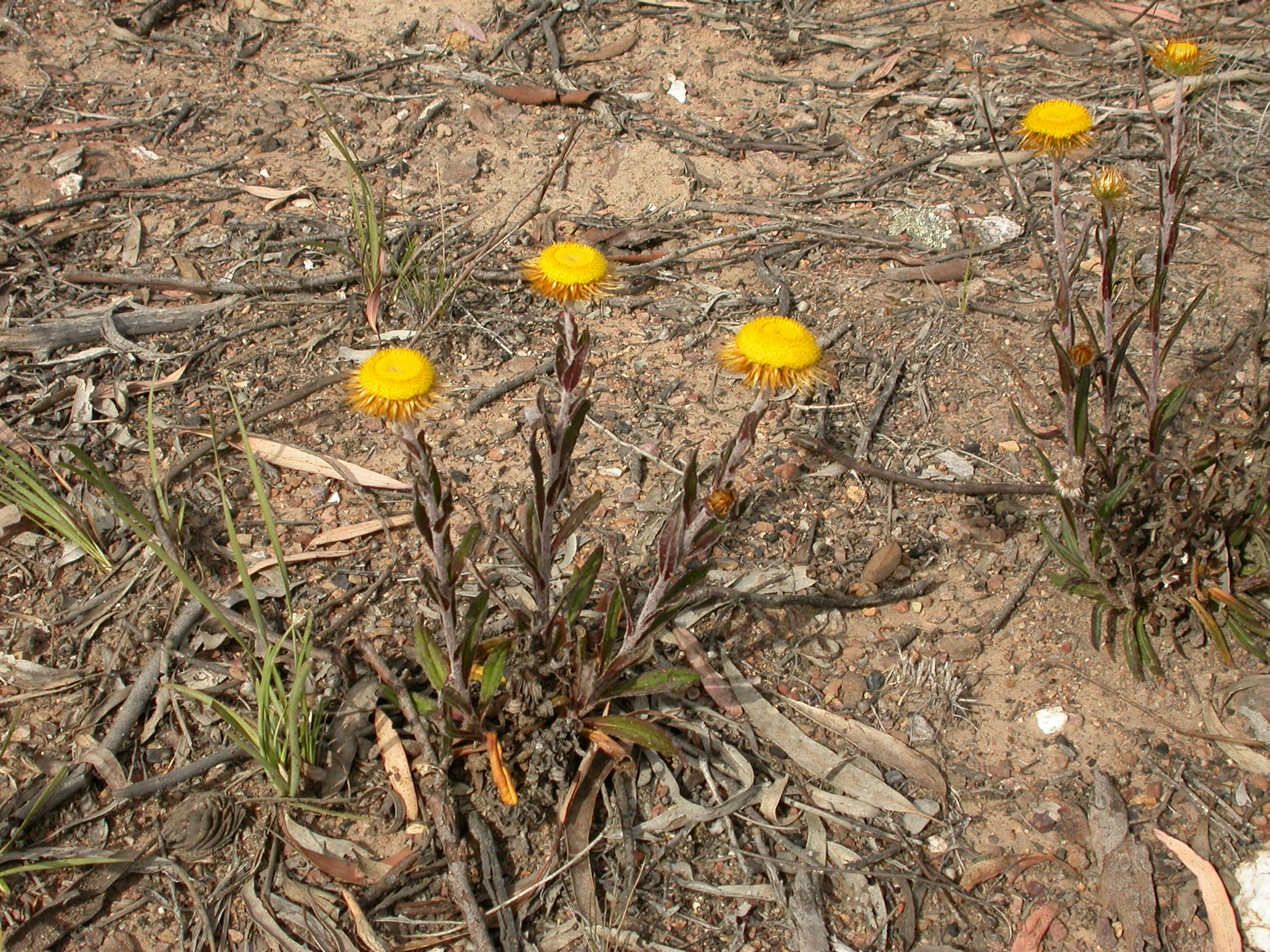
