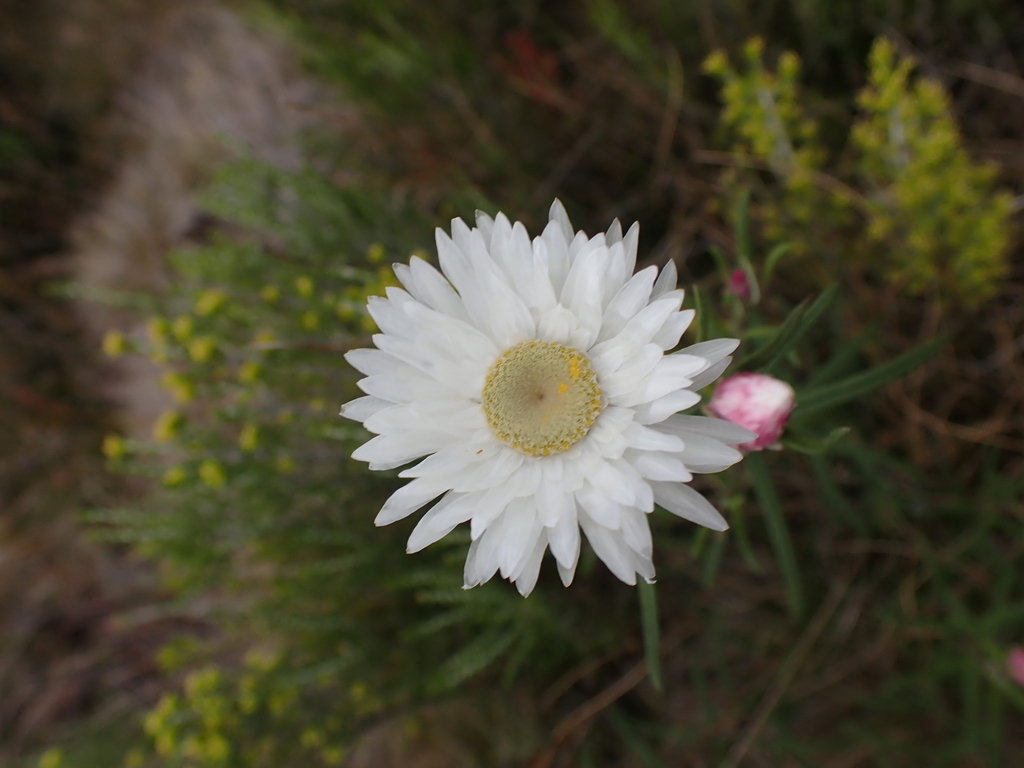
- In the Jagungal Wilderness

Scientific classification
- Kingdom: Plantae
- Clade: Embryophytes
- Clade: Tracheophytes
- Clade: Spermatophytes
- Clade: Angiosperms
- Clade: Eudicots
- Clade: Asterids
- Order: Asterales
- Family: Asteraceae
- Genus: Coronidium
- Species: C. waddelliae

Binomial name
- Coronidium waddelliae (J.H.Willis)Paul G.Wilson

Synonyms
- Helichrysum adenophorum var. waddellae J.H.Willis orth. var. Helichrysum adenophorum var. waddelliae J.H.Willis

= Coronidium waddelliae =

Species of flowering plant

Coronidium waddelliae is a species of flowering plant in the family Asteraceae and is endemic to a south eastern Australia. It is an erect multi-stemmed annual or perennial herb, with sessile linear leaves, and in solitary heads with white bracts.

== Description ==
Coronidium waddelliae is an erect, multi-stemmed annual or perennial herb that typically grows to a height of about 60 cm (24 in), its stems covered with glandular hairs. Its leaves are sessile, linear, up to 50 mm (2.0 in) long, mostly 1–3 mm (0.039–0.118 in) wide with a few soft, glandular hairs on the upper surface and white, woolly hairs on the lower surface. The flowers are borne in heads 45 mm (1.8 in) in diameter, with several linear bracts at the base and white involucral bracts, the outer bracts sessile and the intermediate bracts narrowly elliptic, 10–17 mm (0.39–0.67 in) long. Flowering occurs from November to May and the cypselas are pale brown, about 2 mm (0.079 in) long with a thread-like pappus.

== Taxonomy ==
This species was first formally described in 1945 by James Hamlyn Willis who gave it the name Helichrysum adenophorum var. waddelliae in the Victorian Naturalist from specimens he collected at 5,000–5,400 ft (1,500–1,600 m) on Mount Speculation in 1945. In 2008, Paul Graham Wilson transferred the species to Coronidium and raised the variety to species status as C. waddelliae. The specific epithet (waddelliae) honours "Miss Winifred Wadell, who urged Willis "to collect and examine specimens, if fortune should ever bring [him] near the rocky fastness".

== Distribution and habitat ==
This species of everlasting occurs in eastern Victoria and eastern New South Wales, where it grows in alpine and subalpine snow gum woodland and heathland, often in rather dry, rocky sites.

== Conservation status ==
Coronidium waddelliae is listed as 'vulnerable' under the Victorian Government Flora and Fauna Guarantee Act 1988.
