= Coronidium flavum =

Scientific classification
- Kingdom: Plantae
- Clade: Tracheophytes
- Clade: Angiosperms
- Clade: Eudicots
- Clade: Asterids
- Order: Asterales
- Family: Asteraceae
- Genus: Coronidium
- Species: C. flavum

Binomial name
- Coronidium flavum Paul G.Wilson

Species of flowering plant

Coronidium flavum is a species of flowering plant in the family Asteraceae and is endemic to Queensland, Australia. It is an erect, annual or short-lived perennial herb with woolly stems, narrowly elliptic to egg-shaped leaves with the narrower end towards the base, and heads of yellow flowers.

== Description ==
Coronidium flavum is an erect, annual or short-lived perennial herb with woolly stems and branches that typically grows to a height of up to 75 cm (30 in). Its leaves are sessile, narrowly elliptic to egg-shaped with the narrower end towards the base, wedge-shaped at the base, mostly 40–50 mm (1.6–2.0 in) long. The flowers are yellow and borne in a hemispherical head about 25 mm (0.98 in) in diameter, the outer involucral bracts woolly, yellow, linear to lance-shaped about 4 mm (0.16 in) long, and the inner bracts about 8 mm (0.31 in) long. The cypselas are about 1.3 mm (0.051 in) long, thin and transparent with a pappus with thread-like bristles.

== Taxonomy ==
Coronidium flavum was first described in 2008 by Paul Graham Wilson in the journal Nuytsia from specimens collected 18.5 km (11.5 mi) west of Paluma in 1989. The specific epithet (flavum) means 'yellow', and refers to the colour of the involucral bracts.

== Distribution and habitat ==
This species of everlasting is found in the Wet Tropics, in the hills bordering the Paluma Range National Park north-west of Townsville where it grows in shrubby woodland on rocky slopes in sandy soils over granite.

== Conservation status ==
Coronidium flavum is listed as of "least concern" in Queensland, under the Queensland Government Nature Conservation Act 1992.
