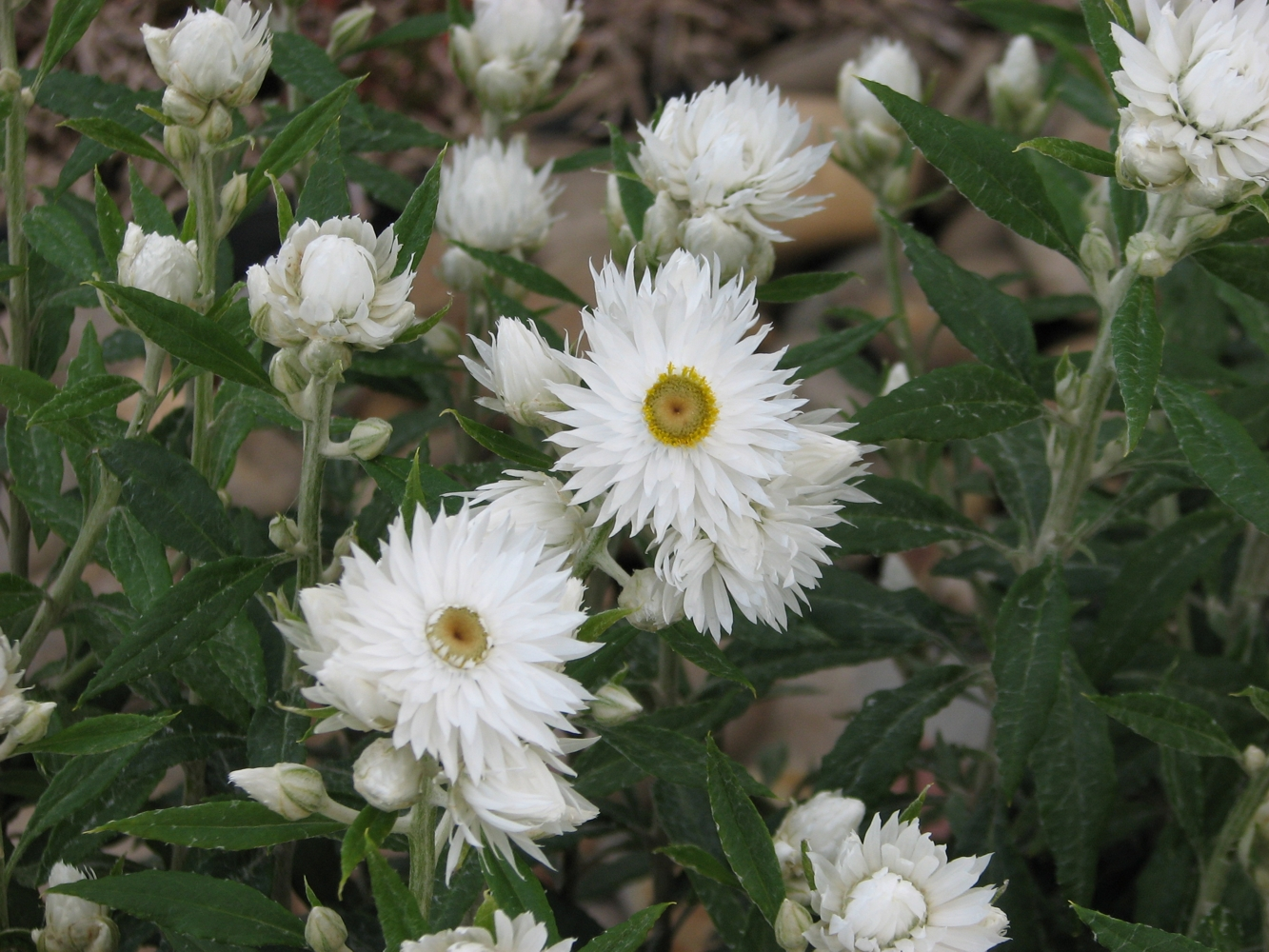
- Coronidium elatum

Scientific classification
- Kingdom: Plantae
- Clade: Embryophytes
- Clade: Tracheophytes
- Clade: Spermatophytes
- Clade: Angiosperms
- Clade: Eudicots
- Clade: Asterids
- Order: Asterales
- Family: Asteraceae
- Subfamily: Asteroideae
- Tribe: Gnaphalieae
- Genus: Coronidium; Paul G.Wilson

Synonyms
- Genus (Aq247974); Helichrysum sect. Oxylepis Benth.; Helichrysum subser. Oxylepidea DC.

= Coronidium =

Genus of flowering plants

Coronidium is a genus of about 21 species of flowering plants in the family Asteraceae. Plants in the genus Coronidium are perennial herbs with disc-like heads of flowers, surrounded by several rows of involucral bracts, the florets usually bisexual with narrowly cylindrical petals forming a tube. After flowering, glabous, oblong cypselas form with a bristly pappus.

== Taxonomy ==
The genus Coronidium was first formally described in 2008 by Paul G.Wilson in the journal Nuytsia. The type species is Coronidium oxylepis, previously known as Helichrysum oxylepis, formally described in 1858 by Ferdinand von Mueller in his Fragmenta Phytographiae Australiae from specimens collected on Moreton Island. The species name is derived from the Greek words korone meaning 'a crown' and the diminutive -idion, referring to the short pappus crown in the Coronidium oxylepis group of species.

== Distribution ==
The genus Coronidium is endemic to eastern Australia, apart from two species that also occur in South Australia and one that extends into Tasmania.

=== Species list ===
The following is a list of Coroniudium species accepted by the Australian Plant Census as at March 2026:

- Coronidium adenophorum (F.Muell.) Paul G. Wilson – branched everlasting (S.A., Vic.)
- Coronidium boormanii (Maiden & Betche) Paul G. Wilson (Qld., N.S.W.)
- Coronidium cymosum Paul G. Wilson (Qld.)
- Coronidium densifolium J.M.Black ex N.G.Walsh – dense everlasting (S.A.)
- Coronidium elatum (A.Cunn. ex DC.) Paul G. Wilson – white paper daisy, tall everlasting (Qld., N.S.W., Vic.)
- Coronidium flavum Paul G. Wilson (Qld.)
- Coronidium fulvidum Paul G. Wilson (Qld.)
- Coronidium glutinosum (Hook.) Paul G. Wilson (Qld.)
- Coronidium gunnianum (Hook.) N.G.Walsh – pale swamp everlasting, pale everlasting, Gunn's everlasting (N.S.W., Vic., S.A., Tas.)
- Coronidium kaputaricum Paul G. Wilson (N.S.W.)
- Coronidium lanosum Paul G. Wilson (Qld.)
- Coronidium lanuginosum (A.Cunn. ex DC.) Paul G. Wilson (Qld.)
- Coronidium lindsayanum (Domin) Paul G. Wilson (Qld., N.S.W.)
- Coronidium monticola N.G.Walsh – mountain coronidium (N.S.W., A.C.T., Vic.)
- Coronidium newcastlianum (Domin) Paul G. Wilson (Qld.)
- Coronidium oxylepis (F.Muell.) Paul G. Wilson
  - Coronidium oxylepis subsp. carnosum Paul G.Wilson (Qld.)
  - Coronidium oxylepis subsp. lanatum Paul G.Wilson (Qld., N.S.W., A.C.T.)
  - Coronidium oxylepis (F.Muell.) Paul G.Wilson subsp. oxylepis (Qld., N.S.W.)
- Coronidium rupicola (DC.) Paul G. Wilson – yellow button (Qld.)
- Coronidium rutidolepis (DC.) N.G.Walsh (N.S.W.)
- Coronidium scorpioides (Labill.) Paul G. Wilson – button everlasting (N.S.W., Vic., Tas., S.A.)
- Coronidium telfordii Paul G. Wilson (N.S.W., Qld.)
- Coronidium waddelliae (J.H.Willis) Paul G. Wilson (N.S.W., Vic.)
