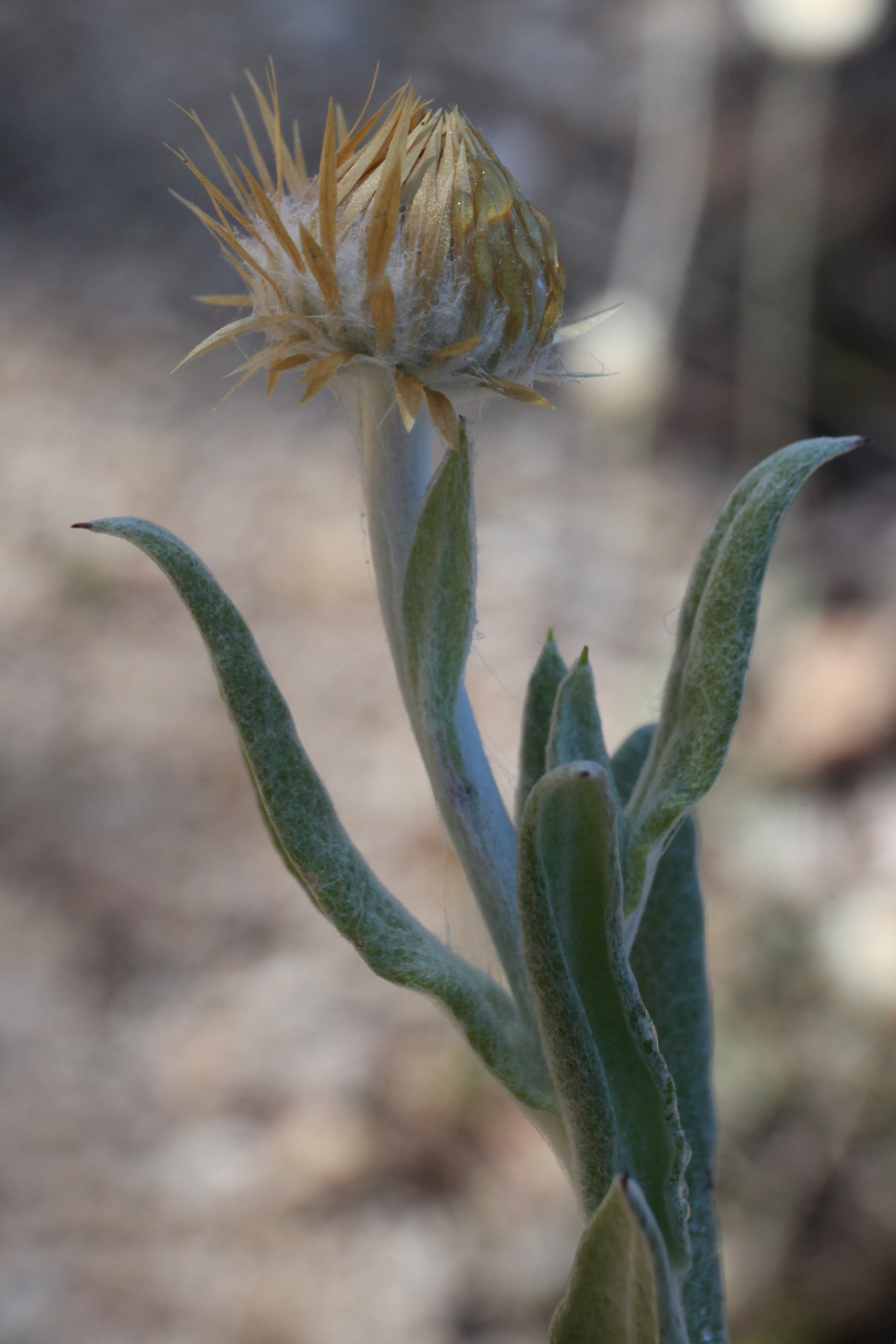

Scientific classification
- Kingdom: Plantae
- Clade: Embryophytes
- Clade: Tracheophytes
- Clade: Spermatophytes
- Clade: Angiosperms
- Clade: Eudicots
- Clade: Asterids
- Order: Asterales
- Family: Asteraceae
- Genus: Coronidium
- Species: C. fulvidum

Binomial name
- Coronidium fulvidum Paul G.Wilson

= Coronidium fulvidum =

Species of flowering plant

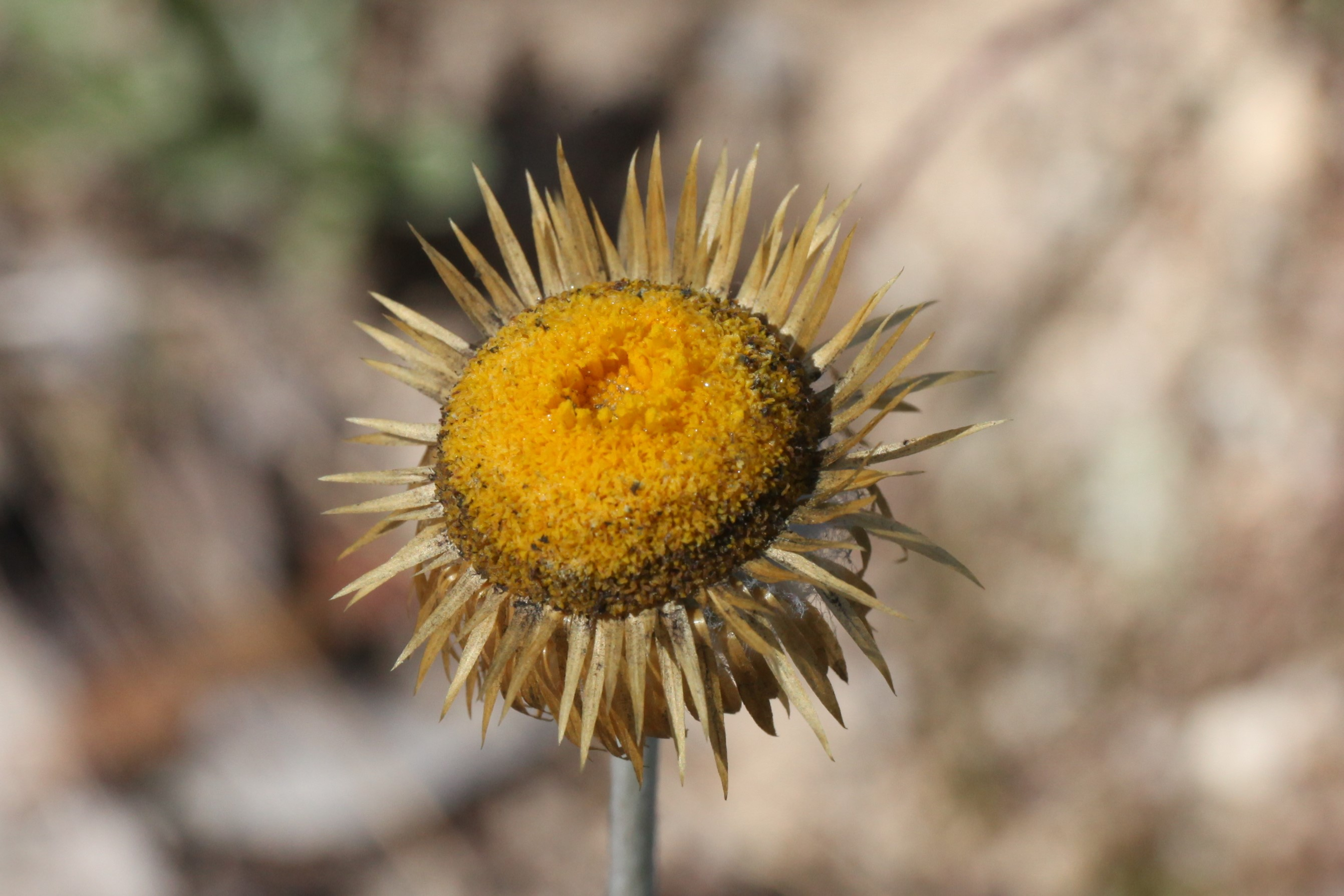

Coronidium fulvidum is a species of flowering plant in the family Asteraceae and is endemic to Queensland, Australia. It is an erect perennial herb with woolly branches, narrowly elliptic leaves, and heads of yellow flowers.

== Description ==
Coronidium fulvidum is an erect perennial herb with slender woolly branches that typically grows to a height of up to 1 m (3 ft 3 in). Its leaves are subsessile, narrowly elliptic mostly 40–90 mm (1.6–3.5 in) long, woolly on the lower surface and sparsely woolly to glabrous above. The flowers are yellow and borne in a more or less spherical head 25–30 mm (0.98–1.18 in) in diameter with pale yellowish brown bracts, the outer involucral bracts narrowly elliptic, glossy with a few woolly hairs about 4 mm (0.16 in) long, and the inner bracts about 6 mm (0.24 in) long. The cypselas have a pappus with thread-like bristles.

== Taxonomy ==
Coronidium flavum was first described in 2008 by Paul Graham Wilson in the journal Nuytsia from specimens collected near Herberton by David Jones and Mark Clements in 1989. The specific epithet (fulvidum) refers to the dull yellowish brown colour of the involucral bracts.

== Distribution and habitat ==
This species of everlasting is only known from the Herberton Range in north Queensland where it grows on rocky slopes in open forest.

== Conservation status ==
Coronidium fulvidum is listed as of "least concern" in Queensland, under the Queensland Government Nature Conservation Act 1992.
