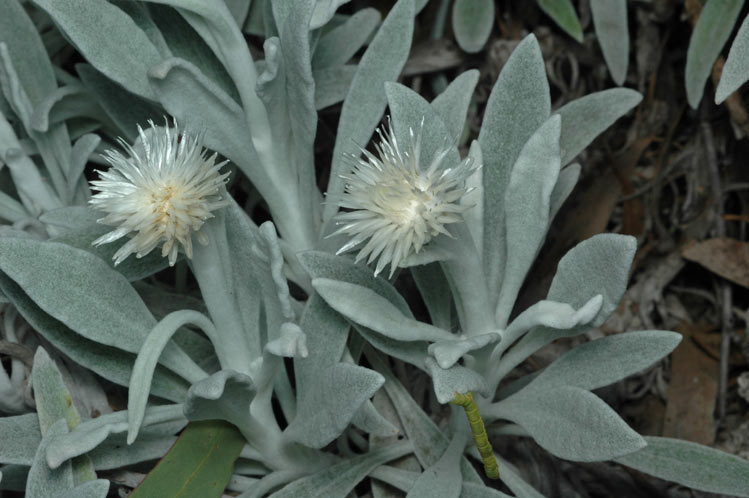

Scientific classification
- Kingdom: Plantae
- Clade: Tracheophytes
- Clade: Angiosperms
- Clade: Eudicots
- Clade: Asterids
- Order: Asterales
- Family: Asteraceae
- Genus: Coronidium
- Species: C. kaputaricum

Binomial name
- Coronidium kaputaricum Paul G.Wilson

= Coronidium kaputaricum =

Species of flowering plant

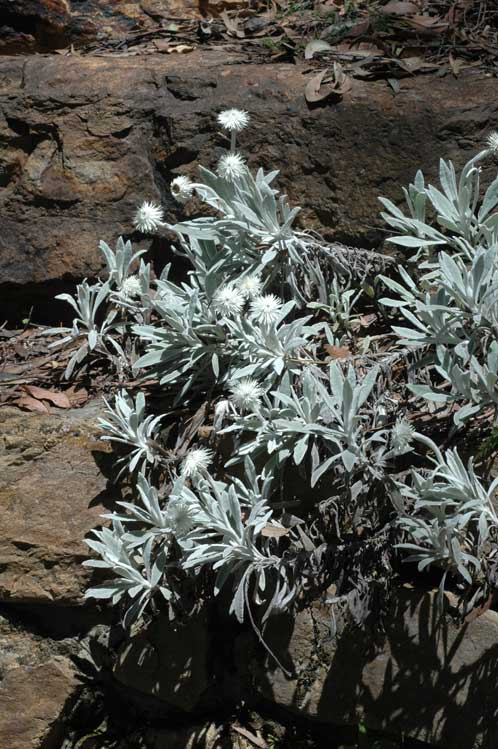
Habit in the Australian National Botanic Gardens

Coronidium kaputaricum is a species of flowering plant in the family Asteraceae and is endemic to New South Wales, Australia. It is a low-lying perennial plant densely covered with woolly hairs, elliptic leaves, and heads of white flowers.

== Description ==
Coronidium kaputaricum is a low-lying perennial plant densely covered with woolly hairs. Its leaves are congested, elliptic, mostly 40–90 mm (1.6–3.5 in) long, with a petiole up to half the length of the leaf. The flowers are borne in a more or less spherical head 35 mm (1.4 in) in diameter with white, glossy, congested, very narrowly oblong involucral bracts up to 12 mm (0.47 in) long, with a few woolly hairs near the base. The cypselas are fawn-coloured, about 3 mm (0.12 in) long and the pappus has thread-like bristles.

== Taxonomy ==
Coronidium kaputaricum was first described in 2008 by Paul Graham Wilson in the journal Nuytsia from specimens collected near "The Governor" in Mount Kaputar National Park by Ian Telford in 1995. The specific epithet (kaputaricum) refers to the type locality.

== Distribution and habitat ==
This species of everlasting is only known from the Nandewar Range on the Northern Tablelands of New South Wales where it grows in crevices in basaltic cliff faces.
