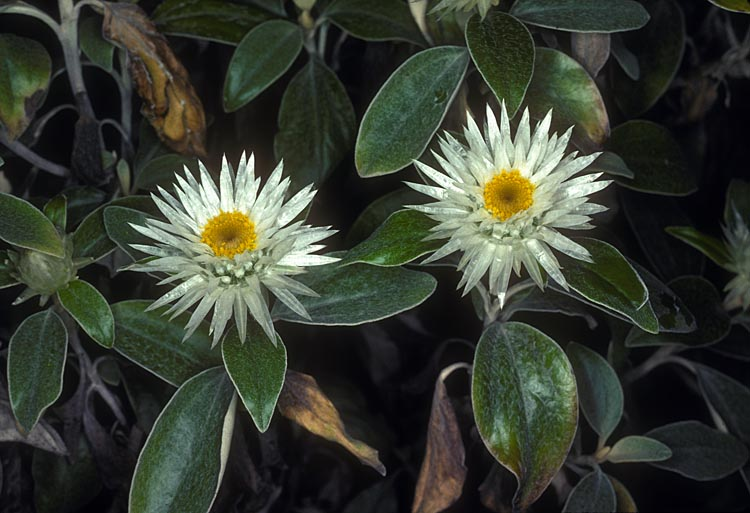
- In the Australian National Botanic Gardens

Scientific classification
- Kingdom: Plantae
- Clade: Embryophytes
- Clade: Tracheophytes
- Clade: Spermatophytes
- Clade: Angiosperms
- Clade: Eudicots
- Clade: Asterids
- Order: Asterales
- Family: Asteraceae
- Genus: Coronidium
- Species: C. telfordii

Binomial name
- Coronidium telfordii Paul G.Wilson

= Coronidium telfordii =

Species of flowering plant

Coronidium telfordii is a species of flowering plant in the family Asteraceae and is endemic to an area near the New South Wales-Queensland border. It is a small shrub with thin, densely woolly branches, egg-shaped to elliptic leaves, heads of white and yellow flowers and smooth, glossy reddish brown cypselas.

== Description ==
Coronidium telfordii is a subshrub that typically grows to a height of 25–50 cm (9.8–19.7 in) and has thin branches densely covered with woolly hairs. Its leaves are egg-shaped to elliptic, 30–50 mm (1.2–2.0 in) long and leathery with a petiole 10 mm (0.39 in) long, the leaves with three veins and glabrous on the upper surface. The flowers are borne in heads 35 mm (1.4 in) in diameter, with linear, densely woolly bracts near the heads, grading into narrowly oblong, pale white to translucent involucral bracts. The cypselas are smooth, reddish brown and glossy, 1.2–2.0 mm (0.047–0.079 in) long and the pappus eventually breaking about 0.6 mm (0.024 in) above the base.

== Taxonomy ==
Coronidium telfordii was first described in 2008 by Paul Graham Wilson in the journal Nuytsia from specimens collected on Mount Merino in the McPherson Range by Ian Telford in 1973. The specific epithet (telfordii) honours the collector of the type specimen and formerly of the Australia National Botanic Garden and the Australian National Herbarium.

== Distribution and habitat ==
This species of everlasting is found in near Mount Merino in the McPherson Ranges near the border of New South Wales and Queensland, where it grows on rocky ledges at the edges of Nothofagus moorei forests.
