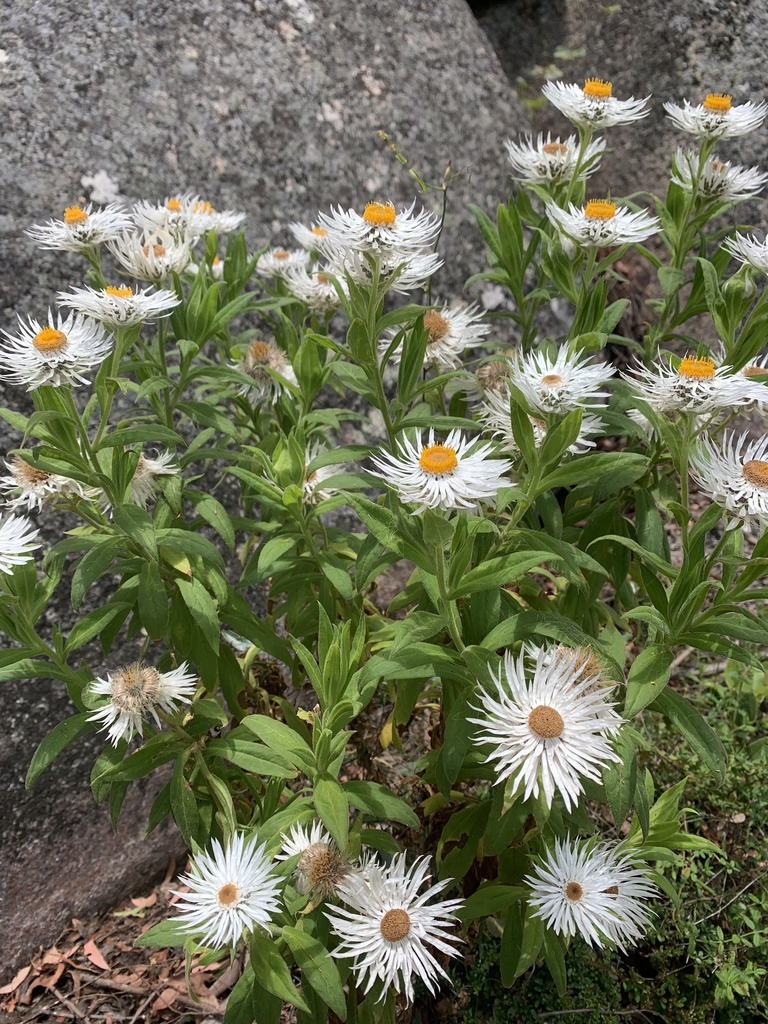
- In Bald Rock National Park

Scientific classification
- Kingdom: Plantae
- Clade: Tracheophytes
- Clade: Angiosperms
- Clade: Eudicots
- Clade: Asterids
- Order: Asterales
- Family: Asteraceae
- Genus: Coronidium
- Species: C. boormanii

Binomial name
- Coronidium boormanii (Maiden & Betche) Paul G.Wilson

Synonyms
- Helichrysum boormanii Maiden & Betche; Helichrysum boormanii Maiden & Betche var. boormanii; Helichrysum boormanii var. typicum Domin nom. inval.

= Coronidium boormanii =

Species of flowering plant

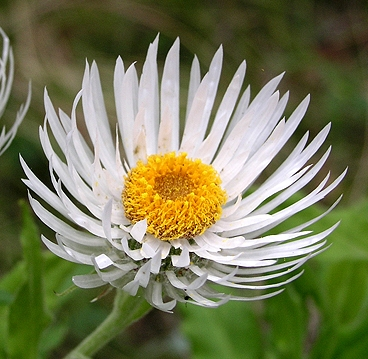
Close up of flower

Coronidium boormanii is a species of flowering plant in the family Asteraceae and is endemic to eastern Australia. It is a woody herb with densely hairy stems, elliptic to narrowly elliptic leaves and heads of white flowers.

== Description ==
Coronidium boormanii is a woody herb that typically grows to a height of 60–100 cm (24–39 in) and has stems densely covered with short glandular hairs. Its leaves are sessile, elliptic to narrowly elliptic, 40–100 mm (1.6–3.9 in) long, 1.0–1.8 mm (0.039–0.071 in) wide with a stem-clasping base and densely covered with glandular hairs. The flowers are borne in a single or three to seven hemispherical heads 30–60 mm (1.2–2.4 in) in diameter with white involucral bracts at the base, the intermediate bracts the longest. Flowering occurs throughout the year, and the cypselas are about 2.5 mm (0.098 in) long, crusty and glossy dark brown with a bristly pappus.

== Taxonomy ==
This species was first described in 1905 by Joseph Maiden and Ernst Betche who gave it the name Helichrysum boormanii in the Proceedings of the Linnean Society of New South Wales. In 2008, Paul Graham Wilson transferred the species to Coronidium as C. boormanii in the journal Nuytsia.

== Distribution and habitat ==
This species of everlasting is found from Atherton in north Queensland to Tenterfield in northern New South Wales, where it grows in woodland and forest.

== Conservation status ==
Coronidium boormanii is listed as of "least concern" in Queensland, under the Queensland Government Nature Conservation Act 1992.
