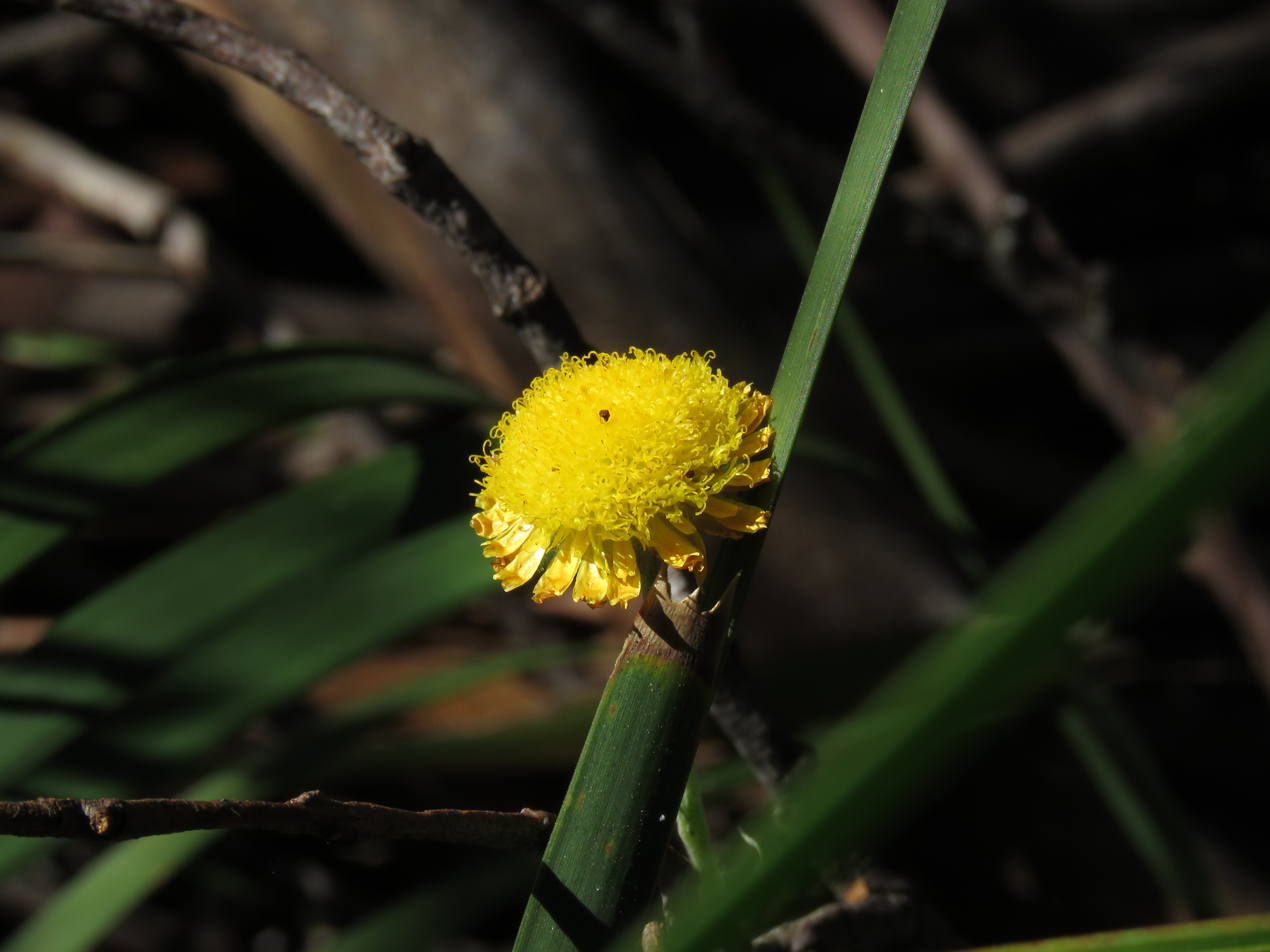

Scientific classification
- Kingdom: Plantae
- Clade: Tracheophytes
- Clade: Angiosperms
- Clade: Eudicots
- Clade: Asterids
- Order: Asterales
- Family: Asteraceae
- Genus: Coronidium
- Species: C. rutidolepis

Binomial name
- Coronidium rutidolepis (DC.) N.G.Walsh

Synonyms
- Coronidium sp. Rutidolepis (A.Cunningham Apr/?) NE Herbarium; Gnaphalium rutidolepis (DC.) Sch.Bip.; Helichrysum rutidolepis DC.

= Coronidium rutidolepis =

Species of flowering plant

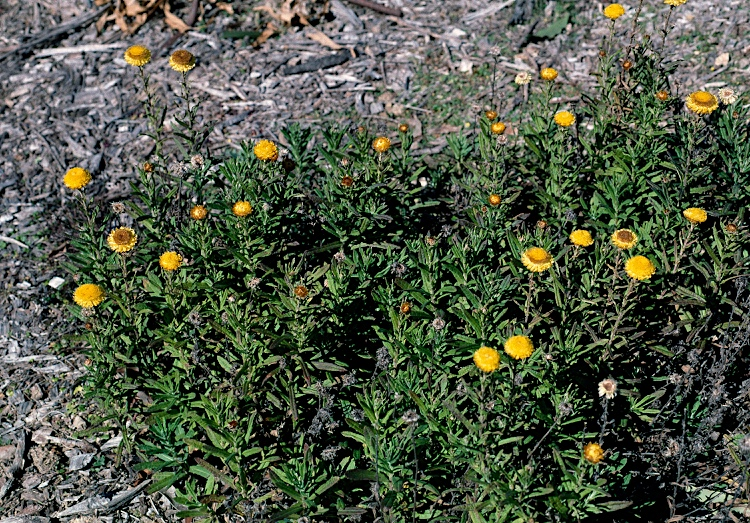
Habit

Coronidium rutidolepis a flowering plant in the family Asteraceae. It is a low-lying to ascending, freely branching perennial shrub with solitary heads of yellow flowers and is endemic to New South Wales, Australia.

== Description ==
Coronidium rutidolepis is a low-lying to ascending perennial shrub that typically grows to a height of up to 50 cm (20 in). Its leaves are narrowly elliptic to lance-shaped with the narrower end towards the base, 250–750 mm (9.8–29.5 in) long and 1.5–15 mm (0.059–0.591 in) wide, its base surrounding the stem and the edges flat or rolled under. The flowers are borne in a more or spherical head 15–18 mm (0.59–0.71 in) in diameter with five to eight rows of pale to brownish-yellow involucral bracts at the base. The florets have corollas 2.5–4 mm (0.098–0.157 in) long, the outermost series usually containing some female-only florets. Flowering occurs from December to June, and the achenes of the outer female flowers lack a pappus or have a few bristles around the edges.

== Taxonomy ==
This species was first described in 1838 by Augustin Pyramus de Candolle who gave it the name Helichrysum rutidolepis from specimens collected near Port Jackson, by Allan Cunningham. In 2014, Neville Grant transferred the species to Coronidium as C. rutidolepis in the journal Muelleria.

== Distribution and habitat ==
This species of Coronidium is endemic to New South Wales and grows along the Great Dividing Range between Grafton and Nowra in forest and near the edges of rainforest from sea level to an altitude of about 1,250 m (4,100 ft).
