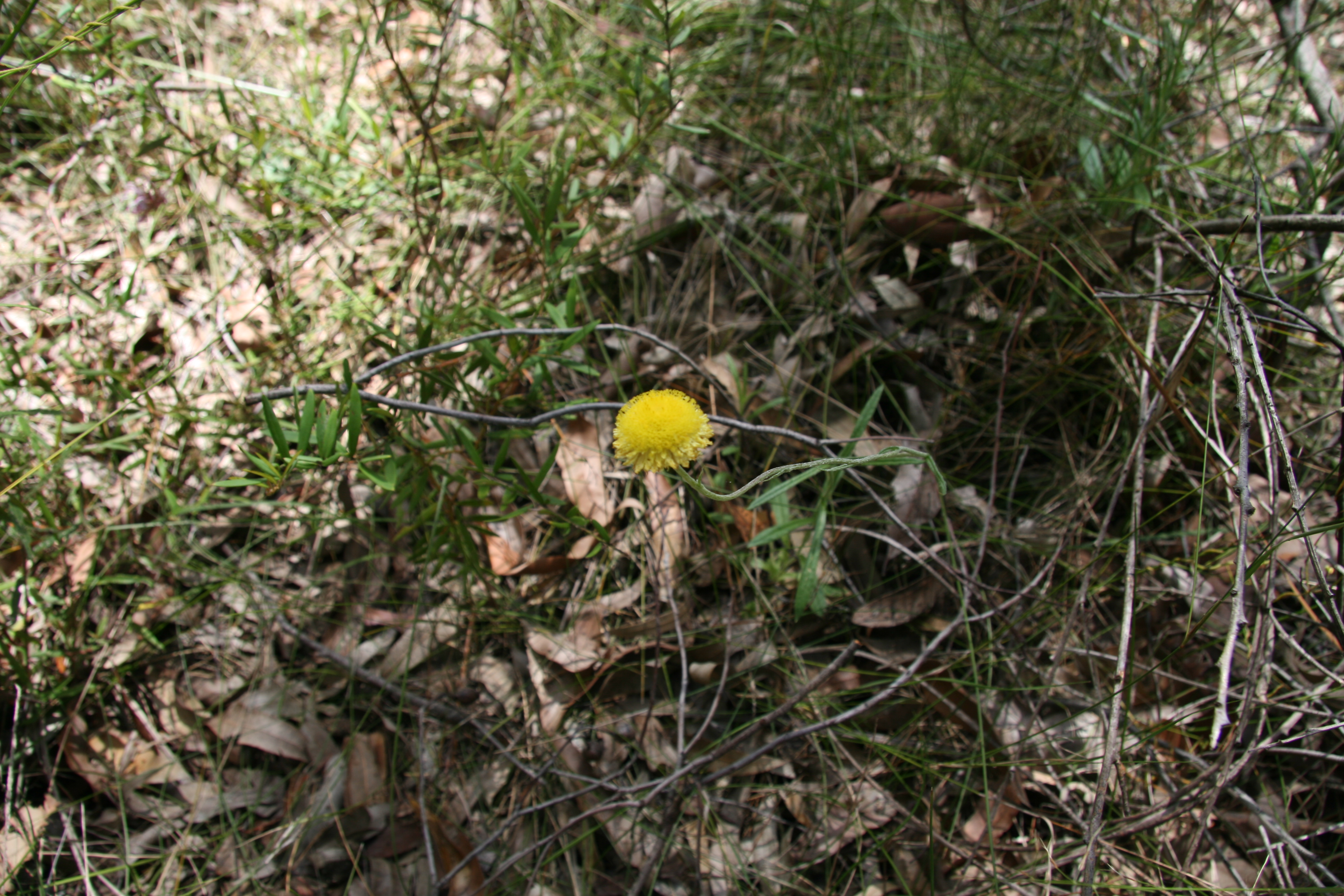

Scientific classification
- Kingdom: Plantae
- Clade: Embryophytes
- Clade: Tracheophytes
- Clade: Spermatophytes
- Clade: Angiosperms
- Clade: Eudicots
- Clade: Asterids
- Order: Asterales
- Family: Asteraceae
- Genus: Coronidium
- Species: C. scorpioides

Binomial name
- Coronidium scorpioides (Labill.) Paul G.Wilson

Synonyms
- Coronidium sp. Many Peaks (I.R.Telford 12309) NE Herbarium; Elichrysum bupthalmoides Spreng. orth. var.; Elichrysum scorpioides Labill. orth. var.; Gnaphalium scorpioides (Labill.) Poir.; Helichrysum buphthalmoides Sieber ex Spreng.; Helichrysum bupthalmoides Spreng. orth. var.; Helichrysum scorpioides Labill.; Helichrysum scorpioides Labill. var. scorpioides; Helichrysum semipapposum var. gunnianum DC.; Xeranthemum scorpioides (Labill.) Poir.

= Coronidium scorpioides =

Species of flowering plant

Coronidium scorpioides, commonly known as button everlasting, is a perennial, herbaceous shrub in the family Asteraceae and is found in eastern Australia. It has sessile, egg-shaped to lance-shaped leaves, solitary heads of usually pale or lemon-yellow flowers and narrowly cylindrical achenes. It was previously known as Helichrysum scorpioides.

== Description ==
Button everlasting is an ascending to erect, herbaceous perennial plant that typically grows to 5–55 cm (2.0–21.7 in) high with simple stems or few branches usually from arising from a rosette. The rosette leaves are egg-shaped to lance-shaped with the narrower end towards the base, the stem leaves similar to almost linear, 20–90 mm (0.79–3.54 in) long and 3–21 mm (0.12–0.83 in) wide. The flowers are borne in a more or hemispherical head 20–35 mm (0.79–1.38 in) in diameter with five to eight rows of pale- or lemon-yellow involucral bracts at the base. The florets have corollas 4.5–7.5 mm (0.18–0.30 in) long, the outermost series containing some female-only florets. Flowering mainly occurs from October to January, and the achenes are narrowly cylindrical, 2–3.5 mm (0.079–0.138 in) long with four ribs and glabrous, with a pappus about the same length as the corolla.

== Taxonomy and naming ==
Jacques Labillardière was the first to formally describe the button everlasting and in 1806 gave it the name Helichrysum scorpioides from a specimen collected in Tasmania. The large genus Helichrysum was long recognised as polyphyletic and in 2008, Paul Graham Wilson erected the new genus Coronidium for 17 species of daisy of the eastern states of Australia, and it was given its new name of C. scorpioides. Wilson suspects there may be several species within C. scorpioides as currently defined, but deferred formally splitting them when revising the genus.

== Distribution and habitat ==
Coronidium scorpioides is widespread and common from near the Queensland-New South Wales border, through Victoria to Port Lincoln in South Australia as well as in Tasmania. It grows on heavier more fertile soils, such as brown clay or clay-loam, derived from basalt, or sandstone-shale, in open forest under such trees as narrow-leaved peppermint (Eucalyptus radiata), Sydney peppermint (E. piperita), brown barrel (E. fastigata), grey gum (E. punctata), manna gum (E. viminalis) or Blaxland's stringybark (E. blaxlandii), or in more open woodland under scribbly gum (Eucalyptus sclerophylla) and narrow-leaved apple (Angophora bakeri).

== Ecology ==
Coronidium scorpioides resprouts after bushfire, some plants taking as little as 16 weeks to flower.
