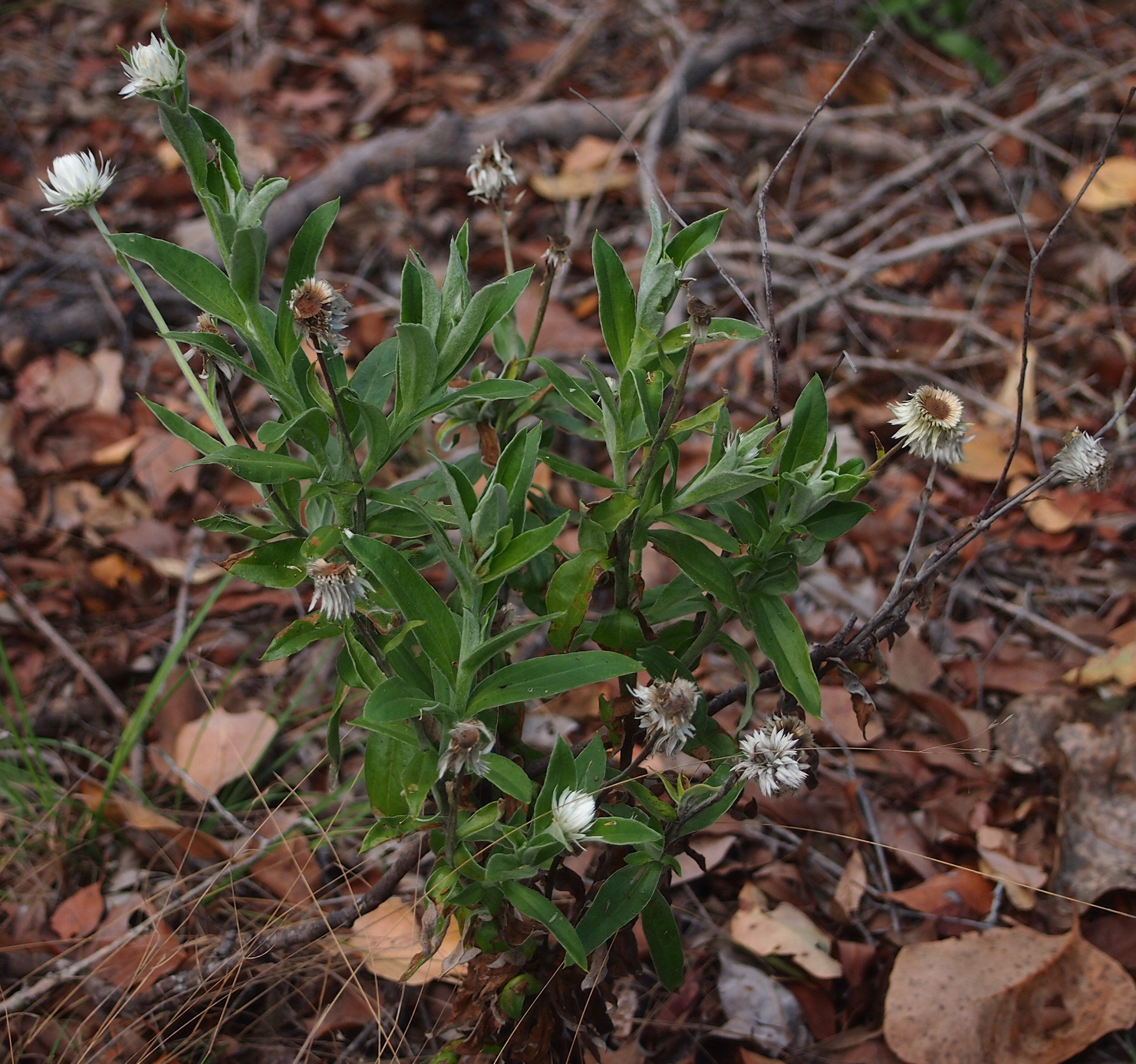

Scientific classification
- Kingdom: Plantae
- Clade: Tracheophytes
- Clade: Angiosperms
- Clade: Eudicots
- Clade: Asterids
- Order: Asterales
- Family: Asteraceae
- Genus: Coronidium
- Species: C. cymosum

Binomial name
- Coronidium cymosum Paul G.Wilson

= Coronidium cymosum =

Species of flowering plant

Coronidium cymosum is a species of flowering plant in the family Asteraceae and is endemic to Queensland, Australia. It is an erect, annual or perennial herb with woolly stems, narrowly elliptic leaves and heads of white flowers.

== Description ==
Coronidium cymosum is an erect, annual or perennial herb with cobwebby to woolly stems and branches that typically grows to a height of 1.5 m (4 ft 11 in). Its leaves are narrowly elliptic, mostly 40–90 mm (1.6–3.5 in) long and narrowed to a short petiole. The flowers are borne in more or less spherical heads about 20–25 mm (0.79–0.98 in) in diameter with sparsely to moderately woolly bracts. Flowering has been recorded in November, and the cypselas are 1.5 mm (0.059 in) long and straw-coloured with a pappus about 5 mm (0.20 in) long.

== Taxonomy ==
This species was first described in 2008 by Paul Graham Wilson in the journal Nuytsia from specimens collected on the Blackdown Tableland in 1971. The specific epithet (cymosum) "is derived from the cymose appearance of the inflorescence".

== Distribution and habitat ==
This species of everlasting is found in coastal north-east Queensland and on the Blackdown Tableland where it grows in coastal dunes in sandy soil in forest or ridges.

== Conservation status ==
Coronidium cymosum is listed as of "least concern" in Queensland, under the Queensland Government Nature Conservation Act 1992.
