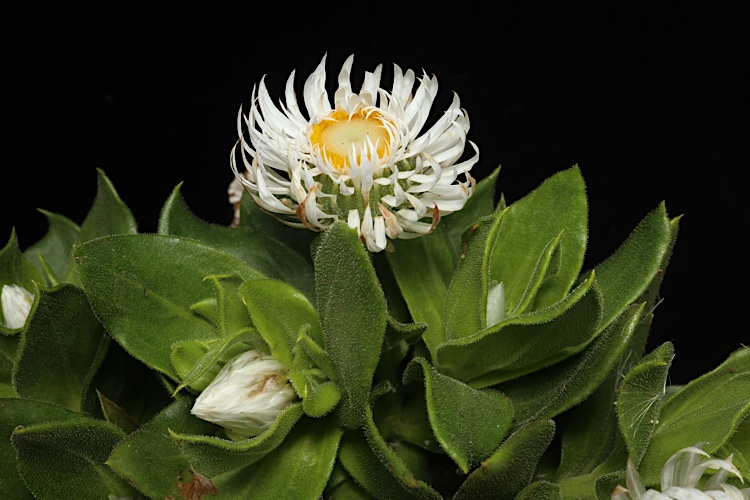
- In the Australian National Botanic Gardens

Conservation status
- Least Concern (NCA)

Scientific classification
- Kingdom: Plantae
- Clade: Tracheophytes
- Clade: Angiosperms
- Clade: Eudicots
- Clade: Asterids
- Order: Asterales
- Family: Asteraceae
- Genus: Coronidium
- Species: C. lanuginosum

Binomial name
- Coronidium lanuginosum (A.Cunn. ex DC.) Paul G. Wilson

Synonyms
- Gnaphalium stipitatum Sch.Bip.; Helichrysum albicans var. lanuginosum (A.Cunn. ex DC.) Domin; Helichrysum boormanii Maiden & Betche p.p.; Helichrysum boormanii var. gillivrayi Domin; Helichrysum boormanii var. tryonii Domin; Helichrysum elatum var. fraseri Benth. p.p.; Helichrysum lanuginosum A.Cunn. ex DC.

= Coronidium lanuginosum =

Species of flowering plant

Coronidium lanuginosum is a species of flowering plant in the family Asteraceae and is endemic to Queensland, Australia. It is a perennial herb with elliptic or egg-shaped leaves, heads of white and yellow flowers and cypselas with thread-like pappus bristles.

== Description ==
Coronidium lanuginosum is a perennial herb that typically grows to a height of up to 1.5 m (4 ft 11 in) and has branches covered with woolly or glandular hairs. The leaves are elliptic to egg-shaped with the narrower end towards the base, up to 100 mm (3.9 in) long and sessile or narrowly wedge-shaped at the base. The upper surface of the leaves is glabrous or with glandular hairs, and the lower surface is glabrous to densely covered with glandular or woolly hairs. The heads are hemispherical, 30 mm (1.2 in) in diameter and arranged singly with white involucral bracts, the lower bracts loosely arranged and grading into linear. The cypselas are brown, about 1.3 mm (0.051 in) long and the pappus has thread-like bristles joined at the base.

== Taxonomy ==
This species was first formally described in 1838 by Augustin Pyramus de Candolle who gave it the name Helichrysum lanuginosum in his Prodromus Systematis Naturalis Regni Vegetabilis, from an unpublished description by Allan Cunningham of specimens he collected on the shores of Rodds Bay in 1819. In 2008, Paul Graham Wilson transferred the species to Coronidium as C. lanuginosum. The specific epithet (lanuginosum) means 'abounding in wool'.

== Distribution and habitat ==
This species of Coronidium usually grows in rocky places, sometimes on exposed rocky coasts, in northern and eastern Queensland.

== Conservation status ==
Coronidium lanuginosum is listed as "least concern" under the Queensland Nature Conservation Act 1992. It is not listed under the Australian Government Environment Protection and Biodiversity Conservation Act 1999.
