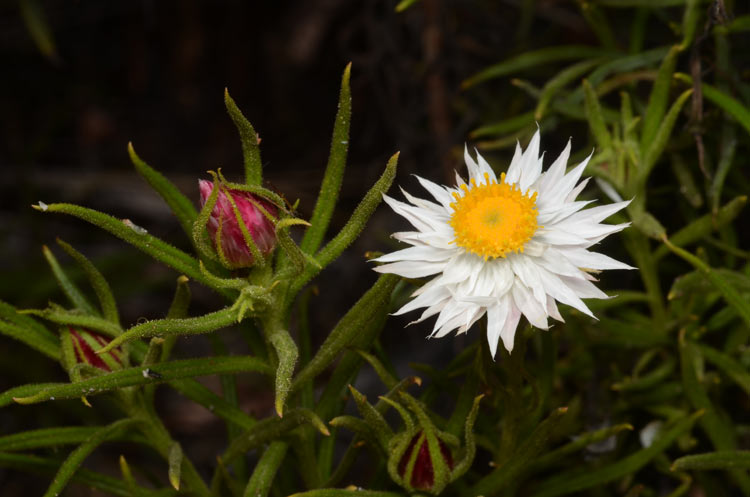

Scientific classification
- Kingdom: Plantae
- Clade: Tracheophytes
- Clade: Angiosperms
- Clade: Eudicots
- Clade: Asterids
- Order: Asterales
- Family: Asteraceae
- Genus: Coronidium
- Species: C. glutinosum

Binomial name
- Coronidium glutinosum (Hook.) Paul G.Wilson

= Coronidium glutinosum =

Species of flowering plant

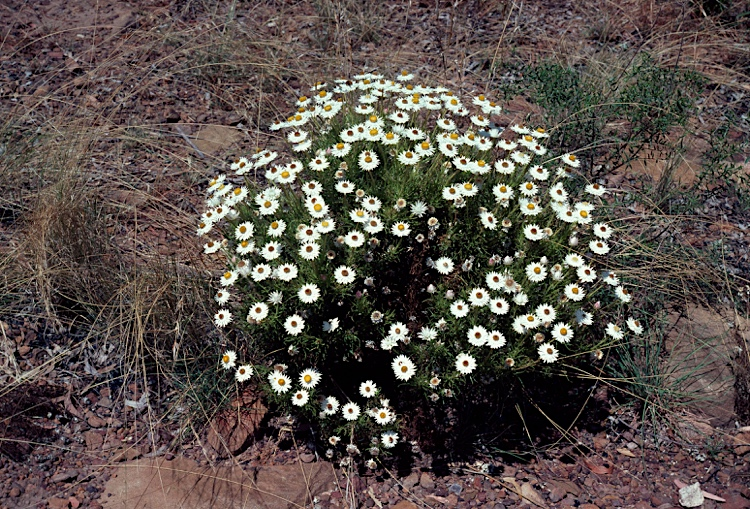
Habit in the Blackdown Tableland National Park

Coronidium glutinosum is a species of flowering plant in the family Asteraceae and is endemic to Queensland, Australia. It is an erect, sticky, strongly aromatic herb with branches covered with glandular hairs, narrowly elliptic leaves, and heads of yellow flowers with white or pink involucral bracts.

== Description ==
Coronidium glutinosum is a sticky, strongly aromatic herb with stems and branches covered with stalked glands. Its seedling leaves are spoon-shaped, 10–25 mm (0.39–0.98 in) long and 7–10 mm (0.28–0.39 in) wide with a stem-clasping base, but absent at flowering. The stem leaves are linear, 30–40 mm (1.2–1.6 in) long and 2–4 mm (0.079–0.157 in) wide with a stem-clasping base, the edges rolled under and both surfaces covered with stalked glands. The flowers are yellow and borne in a more or less spherical head 25–30 mm (0.98–1.18 in) in diameter with white or pink bracts, the outer involucral bracts very narrowly elliptic. Flowering occurs from July to February, and the cypselas are cylindrical to oblong, 1.75 mm (0.069 in) long and 0 mm (0 in) in diameter with a pappus about 5.5 mm (0.22 in) long.

== Taxonomy ==
This species was first described in 1848 by William Jackson Hooker who gave it the name Helipterum glutinosum in Thomas Mitchell's Journal of an Expedition into the Interior of Tropical Australia. In 2008, Paul G.Wilson transferred the species to Coronidium as C. glutinosum in the journal Nuytsia. The specific epithet (glutinosum) means 'sticky'.

== Distribution and habitat ==
This species of everlasting is widespread in the Brigalow Belt North and Brigalow Belt South in north-central Queensland where it usually grows in skeletal soil over sandstone, often in Acacia or eucalypt woodland.

== Conservation status ==
Coronidium fulvidum is listed as of "least concern" in Queensland, under the Queensland Government Nature Conservation Act 1992.
