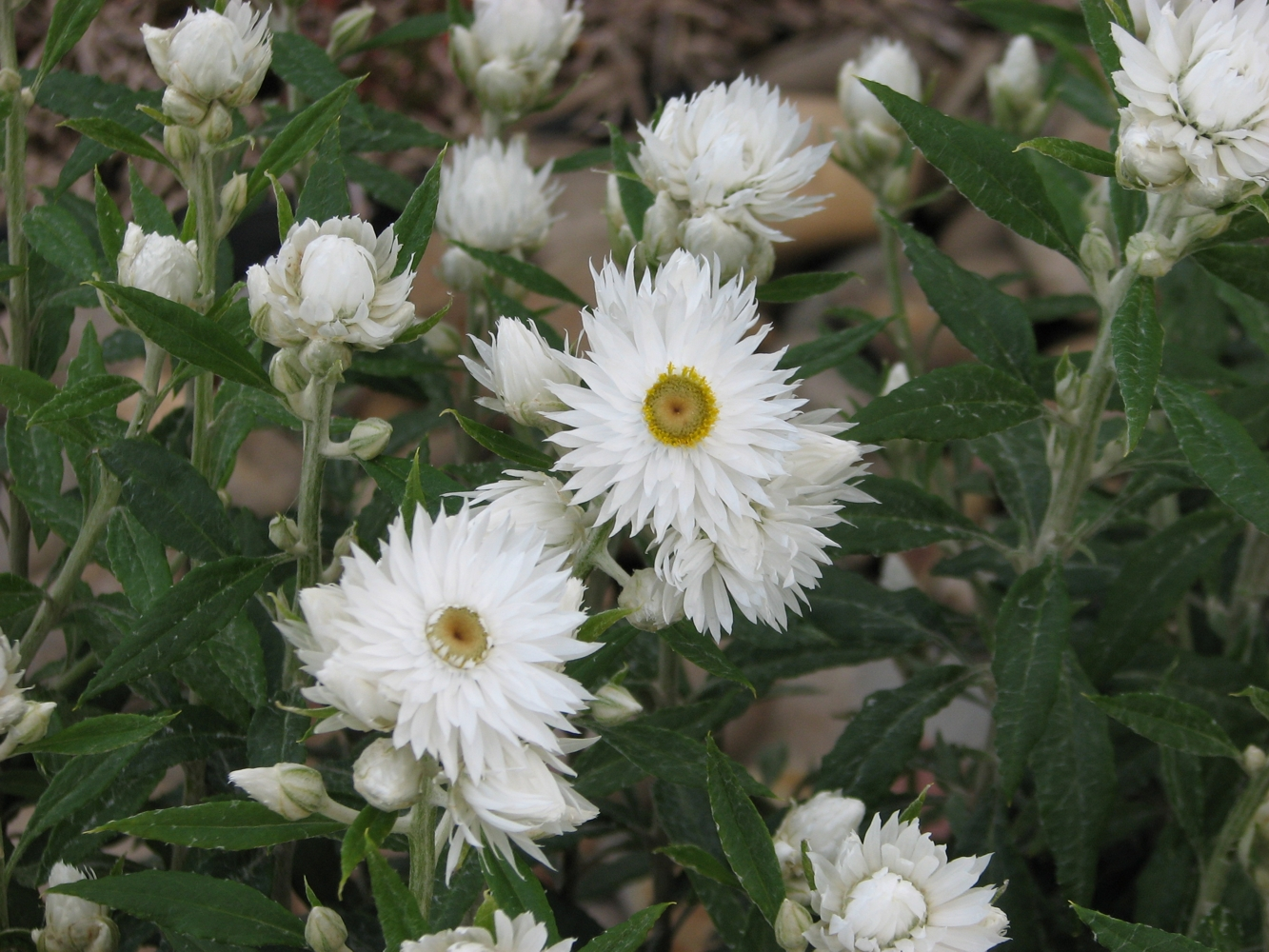

Scientific classification
- Kingdom: Plantae
- Clade: Tracheophytes
- Clade: Angiosperms
- Clade: Eudicots
- Clade: Asterids
- Order: Asterales
- Family: Asteraceae
- Genus: Coronidium
- Species: C. elatum

Binomial name
- Coronidium elatum (A.Cunn. ex DC.) Paul G.Wilson

Synonyms
- Gnaphalium elatum (A.Cunn. ex DC.) Sch.Bip. nom. illeg.; Helichrysum albicans Sieber ex Spreng. nom. illeg.; Helichrysum albicans var. commune Domin nom. illeg.; Helichrysum elatum A.Cunn. ex DC.; Helichrysum elatum A.Cunn. ex DC. var. elatum

= Coronidium elatum =

White paper daisy

Species of flowering plant

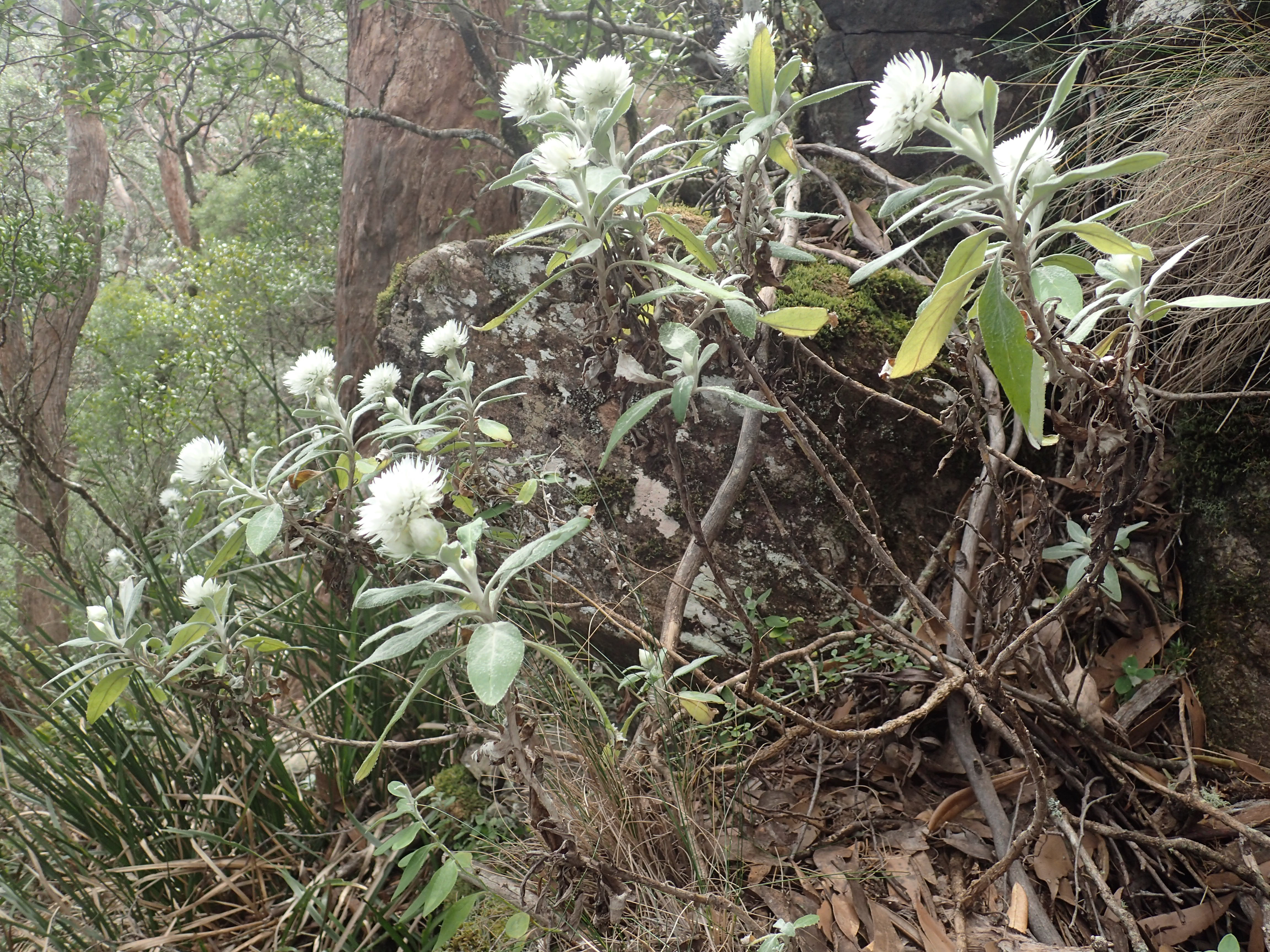
Subspecies minus in the New England National Park

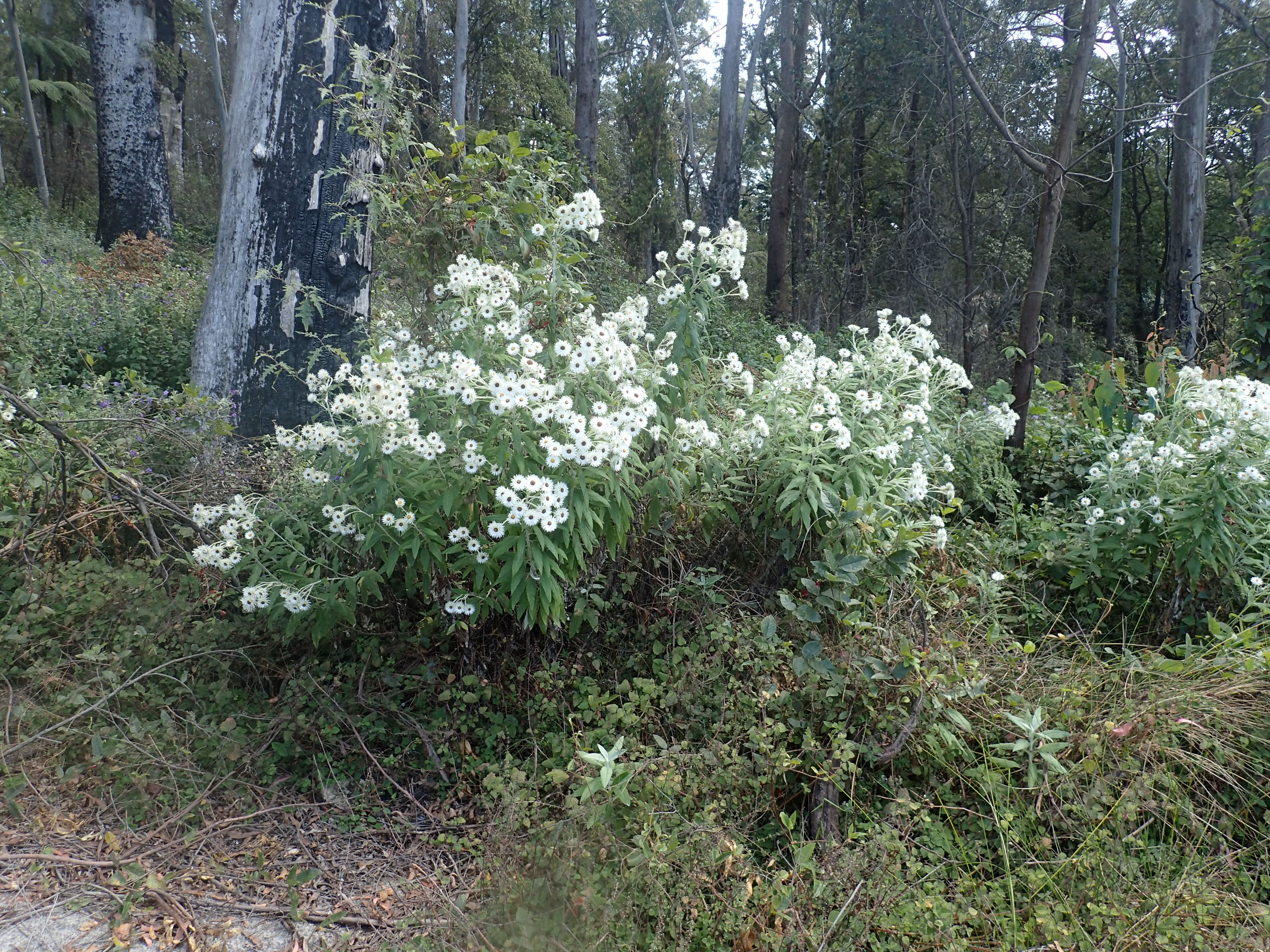
Subspecies elatum in the Gibraltar Range National Park

Coronidium elatum, commonly known as the white paper daisy or tall everlasting, is a perennial herbaceous shrub in the family Asteraceae found in open forests in eastern Australia. A woody shrub 0.6 to 2 m (2.0 to 6.6 ft) tall, it has white flowers which appear in spring. It was known as Helichrysum elatum for many years until it was finally reviewed in 2008.

== Description ==
The plant is a woody shrub or subshrub with an erect habit reaching anywhere from 0.6 to 2 m (2.0 to 6.6 ft) high. The ovate to elliptic leaves are up to 12 cm (4.7 in) long with entire or wavy (sinuate) margins, and sit on 1–2 cm long petioles. The petioles and leaf undersides are covered in white hair, the upper leaf surfaces less so. The flowers appear from June to November, with plants most floriferous in September. The disc is yellow and bracts are white, the flower heads 2.5 to 4.5 cm (0.98 to 1.77 in) in diameter.

== Taxonomy ==
The tall everlasting was collected by the English botanist and explorer Allan Cunningham and described by him in Augustin Pyramus de Candolle's 1838 work Prodromus Systematis Naturalis Regni Vegetabilis as Helichrysum elatum, the species name being the Latin adjective elatus "tall". The large genus Helichrysum was long recognised as polyphyletic and many of its members have been transferred to new genera. Botanist Paul Graham Wilson erected the new genus Coronidium for 17 species of daisy of the eastern states of Australia, and it was given its new name of C. elatum in 2008.

In the same journal, Wilson described three subspecies and the names are accepted by the Australian Plant Census:

- Coronidium elatum (A.Cunn. ex DC.) Paul G.Wilson subsp. elatum has elliptic leaves up to 120 mm (4.7 in) long and the flower head arranged in cymes;
- Coronidium elatum subsp. minus Paul G.Wilson reaches up to 80 cm high and has egg-shaped to elliptic leaves up to 80 mm (3.1 in) long;
- Coronidium elatum subsp. vellerosum Paul G.Wilson reaches a height of 1 m (3.3 ft) and has elliptic leaves up to 120 mm (4.7 in) long and the flower head solitary on long, woolly peduncles.

== Distribution and habitat ==
Coronidium elatum is found from the southeastern corner of Queensland, along the eastern coastal regions of New South Wales and into the tip of eastern Victoria. It grows on shale, basalt or sandstone-based soils which are high in nutrients, in open forest or rainforest margins, under such trees as brown barrel (Eucalyptus fastigata), mountain grey gum (E. cypellocarpa), messmate (E. obliqua) or white stringybark (E. globoidea).

Two of the subspecies are highly restricted in distribution. Subspecies vellerosum is endemic to the summit of Mount Warning and subspecies minus is found only near Point Lookout in New England National Park.

== Uses ==
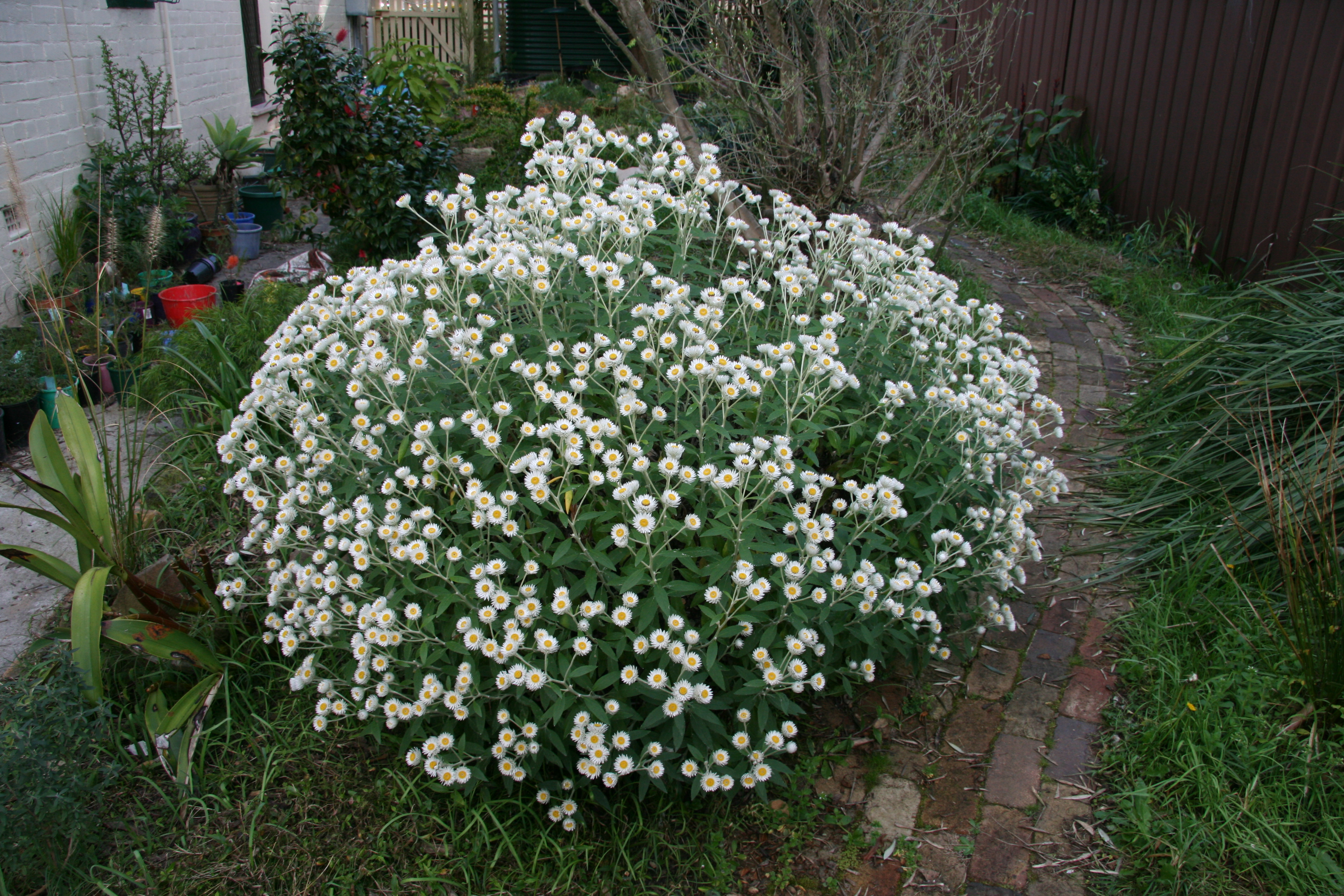
'Sunny side up' cultivar in a Sydney garden

Coronidium elatum is a highly regarded and underutilised garden plant, producing abundant flowers and growing quickly. It is frost hardy and grows in full or part sun. It can be propagated from seed, or by cuttings, although these are susceptible to rotting. One cultivar, Coronidium elatum 'Sunny Side Up', has been released commercially.
