= Kanmantoo bioregion =

Bioregion in South Australia

Kanmantoo
- Region
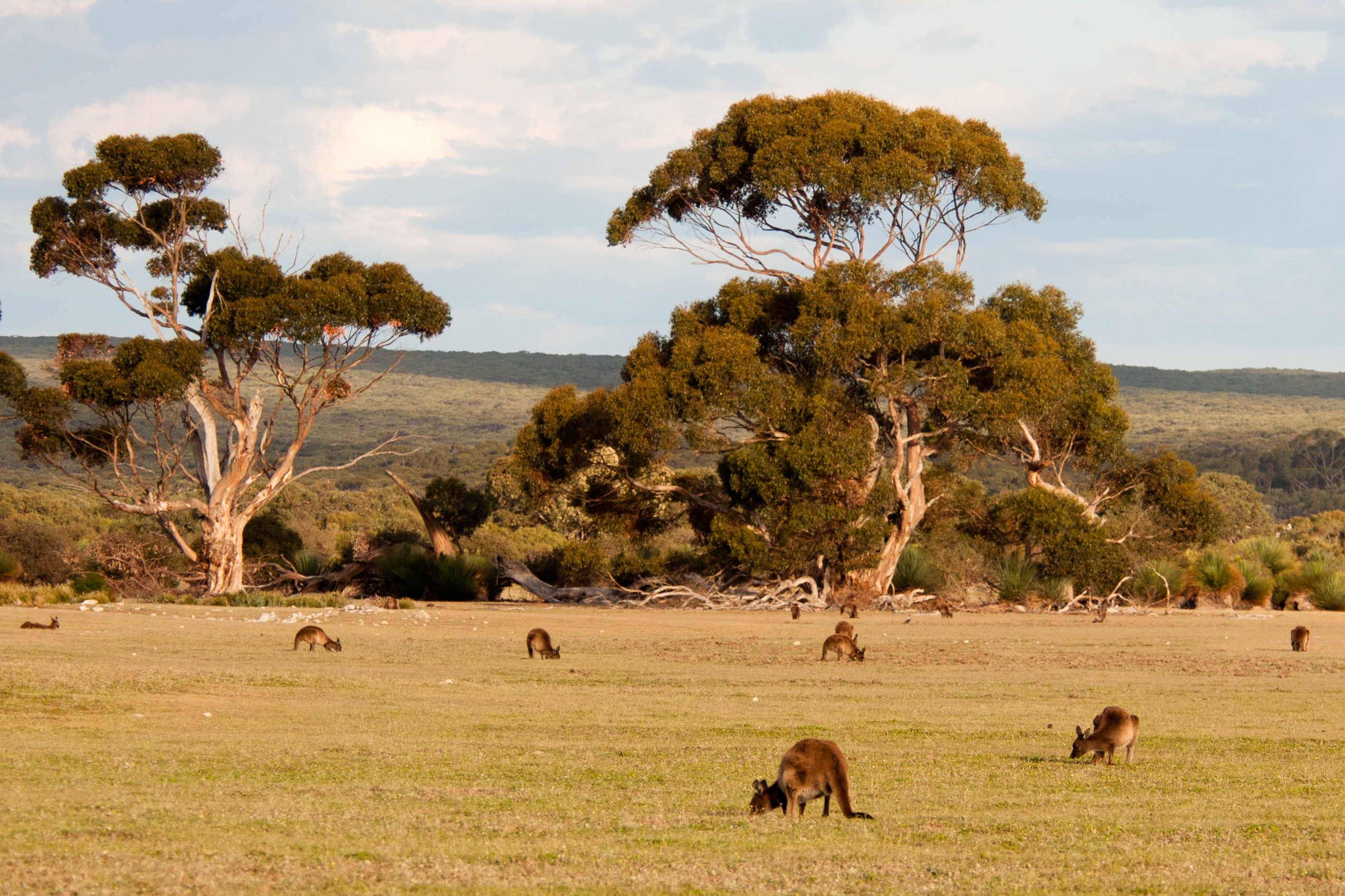
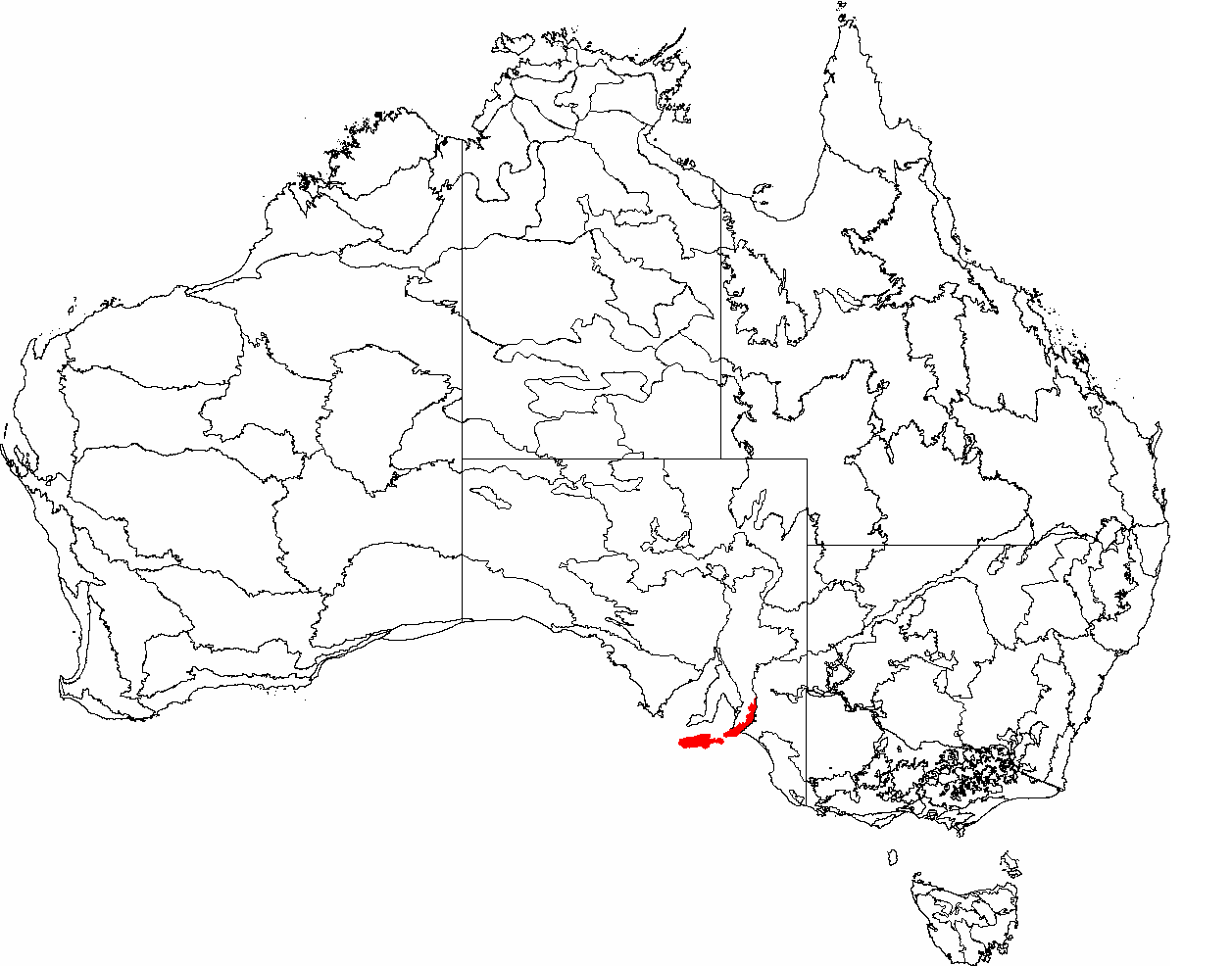
- Open woodland on Kangaroo Island with kangaroos The interim Australian bioregions, with Kanmantoo in red
- Country: Australia
- State: South Australia

Area
  - Total: 8,124.15 km^{2} (3,136.75 sq mi)
Localities around Kanmantoo
Great Australian Bight	Gulf St Vincent	Flinders Lofty Block
Great Australian Bight	Kanmantoo	Murray Darling Depression
Great Australian Bight	Great Australian Bight	Great Australian Bight

Kanmantoo is an interim Australian bioregion located in South Australia. It has an area of 812,415 hectares (2,007,520 acres), which includes the Fleurieu Peninsula and Kangaroo Island. The bioregion is part of the Mount Lofty woodlands ecoregion.

Kanmantoo is made up of two subregions – Fleurieu (370,730 hectares (916,100 acres)) and Kangaroo Island (441,685 hectares (1,091,430 acres)).

== See also ==
- Geography of Australia
