= Acacia wilsonii =

Wilson's wattle

Conservation status
- Endangered (EPBC Act)

Scientific classification
- Kingdom: Plantae
- Clade: Tracheophytes
- Clade: Angiosperms
- Clade: Eudicots
- Clade: Rosids
- Order: Fabales
- Family: Fabaceae
- Subfamily: Caesalpinioideae
- Clade: Mimosoid clade
- Genus: Acacia
- Species: A. wilsonii

Binomial name
- Acacia wilsonii R.S.Cowan & Maslin
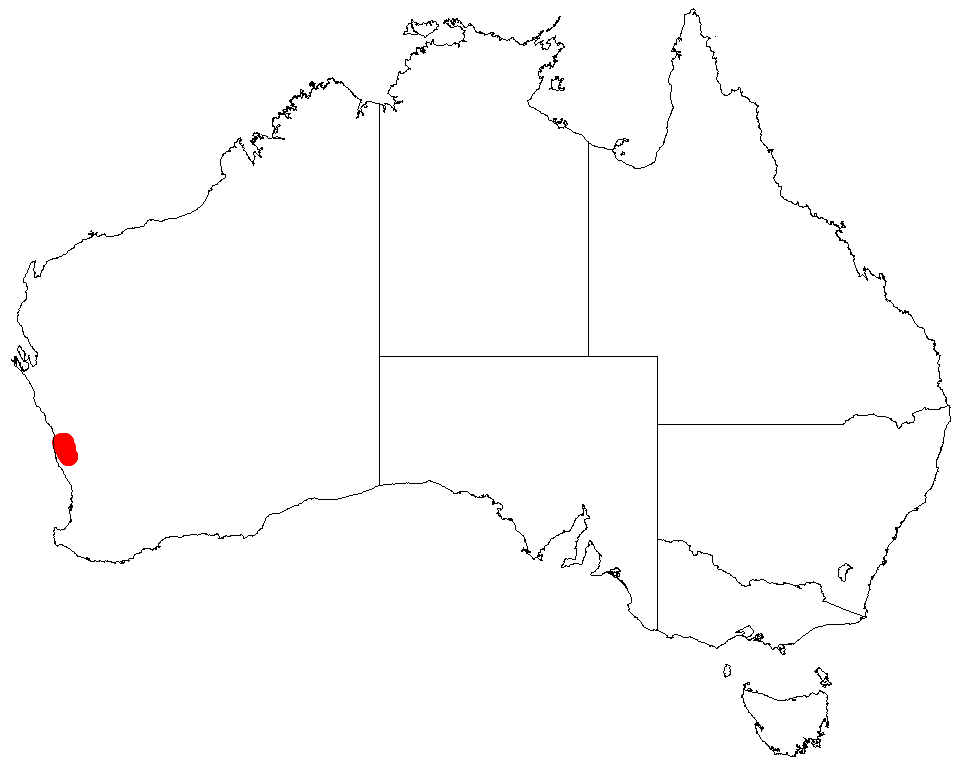
- Occurrence data from AVH

Species of legume

Acacia wilsonii, also known as Wilson's wattle, is a shrub of the genus Acacia and the subgenus Plurinerves that is endemic to a small area of western Australia. It was listed as an endangered species in 2018 according to the Environment Protection and Biodiversity Conservation Act 1999 by Australian authorities and according to Biodiversity Conservation Act 2016 by Western Australian authorities.

== Description ==
The low, spreading and wiry shrub typically grows to a height of 0.2 to 0.5 metres (0.7 to 1.6 ft) and tends to have horizontal branches. Like most species of Acacia it has phyllodes rather than true leaves. The erect, cylindrical and evergreen phyllodes have a length of up to about 13 cm (5.1 in). When it blooms it produces spherical flower-heads that are golden yellow. The seed pods that form after flowering have a linear shape with a length up to 5.5 cm (2.2 in) and hold dull brown oblong shaped seeds.

== Taxonomy ==
The species was first formally described by the botanists Richard Sumner Cowan and Bruce Maslin in 1999. The specific epithet honors Paul G. Wilson who collected the type specimen.

== Distribution ==
It is native to an area in the Wheatbelt and Mid West regions of Western Australia. The range of the species extends from around Eneabba in the north and down to around Badgingarra in the south where it is found growing in sandy or loamy soils usually over laterite and commonly situated on hills or slopes as a part of open heath or mallee woodland communities. It is found to be associated with Eucalyptus suberea, Allocasuarina campestris, Calothamnus quadrifidus, Eucalyptus gittinsii, Eucalyptus eudesmioides, Eucalyptus accedens and Grevillea amplexans.

== See also ==
- List of Acacia species
