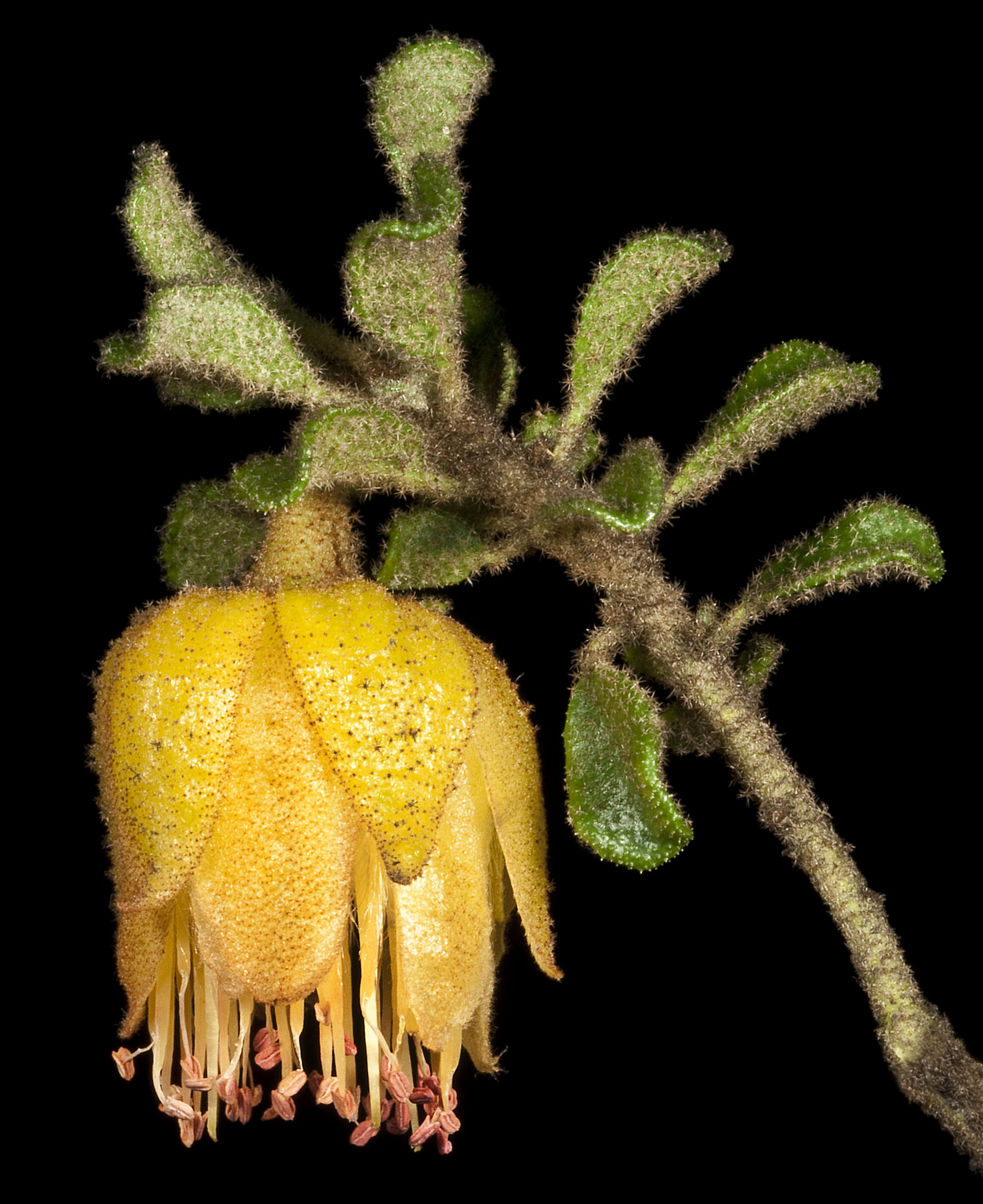

Scientific classification
- Kingdom: Plantae
- Clade: Tracheophytes
- Clade: Angiosperms
- Clade: Eudicots
- Clade: Rosids
- Order: Sapindales
- Family: Rutaceae
- Genus: Diplolaena
- Species: D. obovata

Binomial name
- Diplolaena obovata Paul G. Wilson

= Diplolaena obovata =

Species of plant

Diplolaena obovata is a species of flowering plant in the family Rutaceae. It is a small shrub with yellow, green or red pendulous flowers. It is endemic to Western Australia.

== Description ==
Diplolaena obovata is a small upright shrub to 0.2–0.8 m (7.9 in – 2 ft 7.5 in) high, branchlets are more or less cylindrical, smooth and covered with scales or star-shaped hairs. The leaves are arranged opposite, egg-shaped, papery, 8–15 mm (0.31–0.59 in) wide, 10–22 mm (0.39–0.87 in) long, flat, smooth and covered sparsely with star-shaped hairs. The corolla is yellow, red or green with five overlapping petals 8–9 mm (0.31–0.35 in) long, hairy and surrounded by bracts on a pedicel 5–7 mm (0.20–0.28 in) long. Flowering occurs in May, June, August and September.

== Taxonomy and naming ==
Diplolaena obovata was first formally described in 1998 by Paul G. Wilson and the description was published in Nuytsia. The specific epithet (obovata) means "egg-shaped".

== Distribution and habitat ==
This species grows in shallow sandy soils in south-west Western Australia from Green Head to Lancelin.
