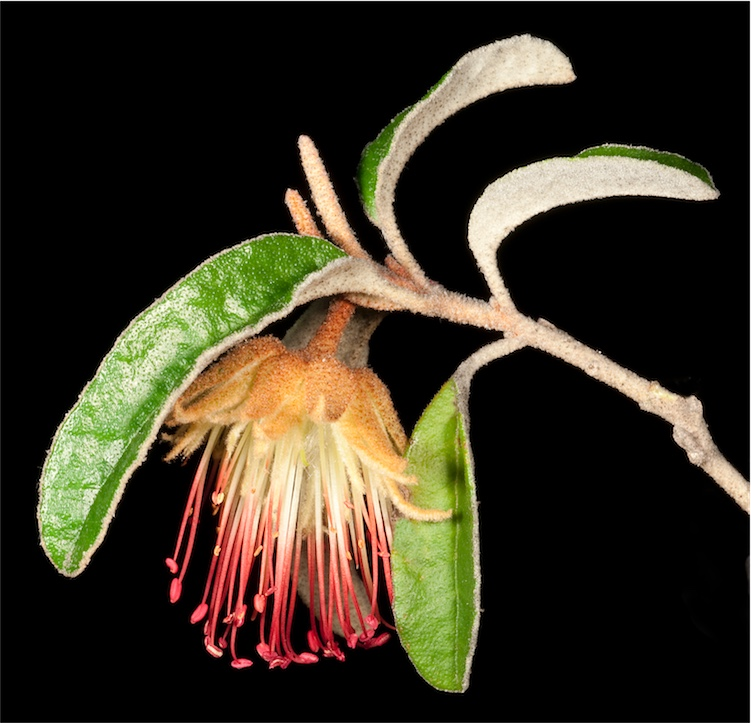

Scientific classification
- Kingdom: Plantae
- Clade: Tracheophytes
- Clade: Angiosperms
- Clade: Eudicots
- Clade: Rosids
- Order: Sapindales
- Family: Rutaceae
- Genus: Diplolaena
- Species: D. ferruginea

Binomial name
- Diplolaena ferruginea Paul G.Wilson

= Diplolaena ferruginea =

Species of flowering plant

Diplolaena ferruginea is a species of flowering plant in the family Rutaceae and is endemic to Western Australia. It has leaves arranged opposite and red and green pendulous flowers.

== Description ==
Diplolaena ferruginea is a small, spreading shrub to 0.2–1 m (7.9 in – 3 ft 3.4 in) high with smooth branches covered in scales or star-shaped hairs. The leaves are simple, leathery, upper surface bright green, arranged opposite, 15–40 mm (0.59–1.57 in) long, 8–20 mm (0.31–0.79 in) wide, flat, smooth, covered in star-shaped hairs or scales. The red or green corolla has 5 overlapping, linear, rust-coloured petals 8–9 mm (0.31–0.35 in) long, outer bracts 12–17 mm (0.47–0.67 in) long, densely covered in rust-colored short matted hairs, pedicels 6–12 mm (0.24–0.47 in) long and numerous, smooth, stamens 15–20 mm (0.59–0.79 in) long, smooth and hairy. Flowering occurs from July to October.

== Taxonomy and naming ==
Diplolaena ferruginea was first formally described in 1971 by Paul Graham Wilson and the description was published in Nuytsia. The specific epithet (ferruginea) means "rust-colored".

== Distribution and habitat ==
This species grows in a variety of situations including gravel, sand, clay on or near the Western Australian coast.
