= Maireana polypterygia =

Scientific classification
- Kingdom: Plantae
- Clade: Tracheophytes
- Clade: Angiosperms
- Clade: Eudicots
- Order: Caryophyllales
- Family: Amaranthaceae
- Genus: Maireana
- Species: M. polypterygia

Binomial name
- Maireana polypterygia (Diels) Paul G.Wilson

Synonyms
- Kochia polypterygia Diels

Species of plant in the amaranth family

Maireana polypterygia, commonly known as many-winged bluebush or Gascoyne bluebush, is a species of flowering plant in the family Amaranthaceae, and is endemic to the north-west of Western Australia. It is a rounded, usually dioecious shrub with woolly branchlets, almost terete to spoon-shaped leaves, glabrous flowers arranged singly, and a glabrous fruiting perianth with several papery, imperfectly developed horizontal wings.

== Description ==
Maireana polypterygia is a rounded, usually dioecious shrub that typically grows to a height of about 70 cm (28 in), its branchlets densely covered with woolly hairs. Its leaves are usually arranged alternately, almost terete to spoon-shaped, 8–15 mm (0.31–0.59 in) long and glabrous. The flowers are arranged singly and glabrous. The fruiting perianth is glabrous with a cup-shaped tube 2.5–4 mm (0.098–0.157 in) high, and several imperfectly developed wings 7–17 mm (0.28–0.67 in) in diameter, and up to four vertical wings.

== Taxonomy ==
This species was first formally described in 1904 by Ludwig Diels who gave it the name Kochia polypterygia in Botanische Jahrbücher für Systematik, Pflanzengeschichte und Pflanzengeographie from specimens collected near the Gascoyne River. In 1975, Paul Wilson transferred the species to Maireana as M. polypterygia in the journal Nuytsia. The specific epithet (polypterygia) means 'many small wings'.

== Distribution and habitat ==
Many-winged bluebush usually grows clay, sandy clay and loam in salt marshes, between Exmouth Gulf and Shark Bay in the Carnarvon and Gascoyne bioregions of north-western Western Australia.

== Conservation status ==
Maireana polypterygia is listed as "not threatened" by the Government of Western Australia Department of Biodiversity, Conservation and Attractions.
