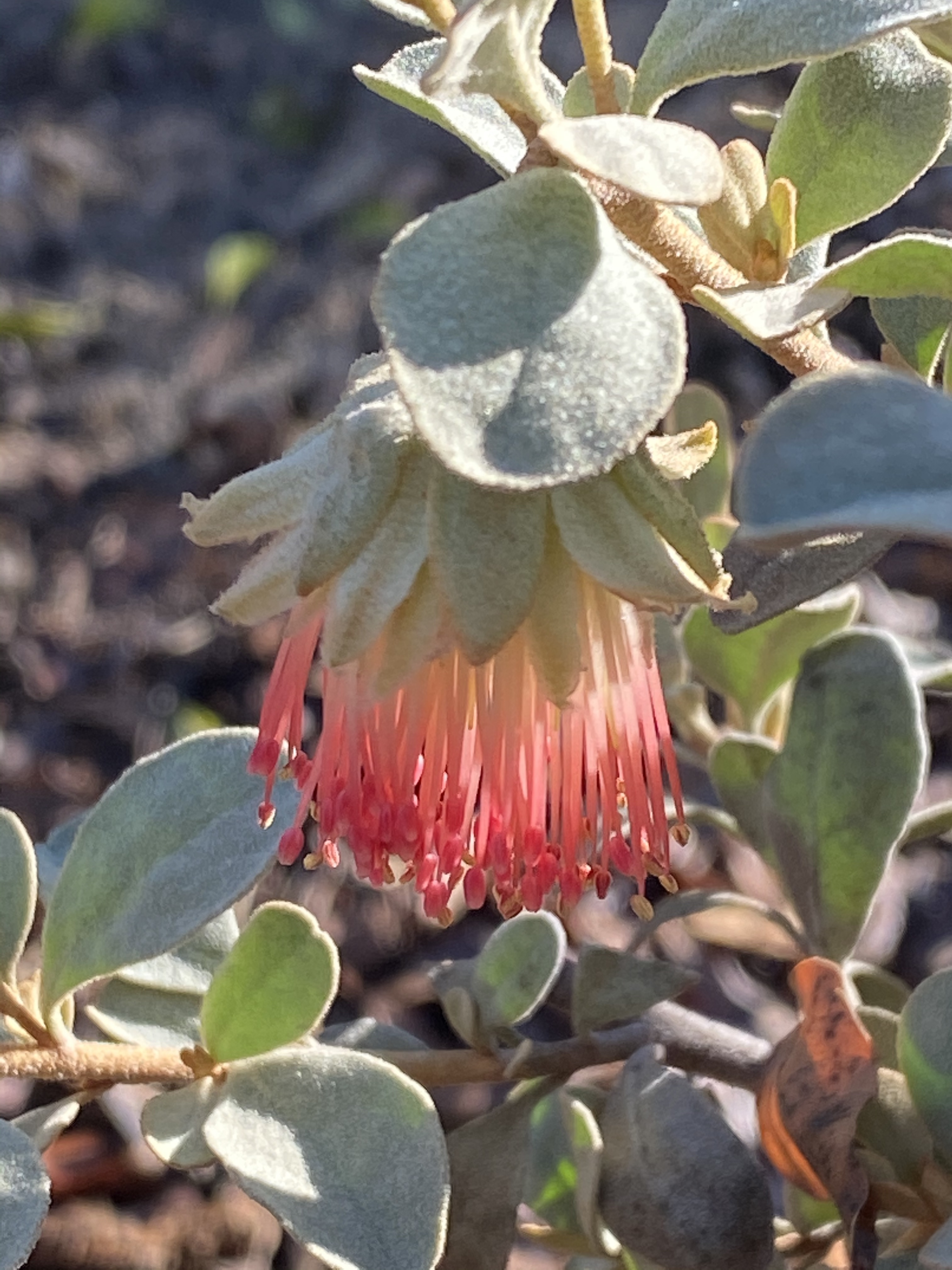
- 'Diplolaena mollis flower & foliage

Scientific classification
- Kingdom: Plantae
- Clade: Tracheophytes
- Clade: Angiosperms
- Clade: Eudicots
- Clade: Rosids
- Order: Sapindales
- Family: Rutaceae
- Genus: Diplolaena
- Species: D. mollis

Binomial name
- Diplolaena mollis Paul G.Wilson

= Diplolaena mollis =

Species of flowering plant

Diplolaena mollis is a species of flowering plant in the family Rutaceae and is endemic to the west coast of Western Australia. It has broadly elliptic or egg-shaped, leathery leaves that are densely covered in hairs and reddish, pendulous flowers.

== Description ==
Diplolaena mollis is a shrub to 2 m (6 ft 7 in) high with broad egg-shaped or elliptic leaves. The leaves are usually 1–2 cm (0.39–0.79 in) long, leathery, wedge-shaped at the base, rounded at the apex, thickly covered in light tan, smooth, soft, weak star-shaped hairs on a petiole 3–6 mm (0.12–0.24 in) long. The flowers about 15–20 mm (0.59–0.79 in) in diameter, outer bracts broadly oval shaped to narrowly oblong, pointed, 6–10 mm (0.24–0.39 in) long, densely covered with soft, smooth, star-shaped hairs. The inner row of bracts barely longer than outer bracts, narrowly oblong, pointed, thin, almost hairless. The pale red petals about 7 mm (0.28 in) long with woolly star-shaped hairs to smooth. The stamens 15–20 mm (0.59–0.79 in) long, pale to dark red with star-shaped, soft, weak, fine hairs toward the base. Flowering occurs from May or July to September.

== Taxonomy ==
This species was first formally described in 1998 by Paul G. Wilson and the description was published in the journal Nuytsia.

== Distribution and habitat ==
Diplolaena mollis grows on the central west coast of Western Australia north of Geraldton to Shark Bay, in scrubland in sandy situations over limestone.
