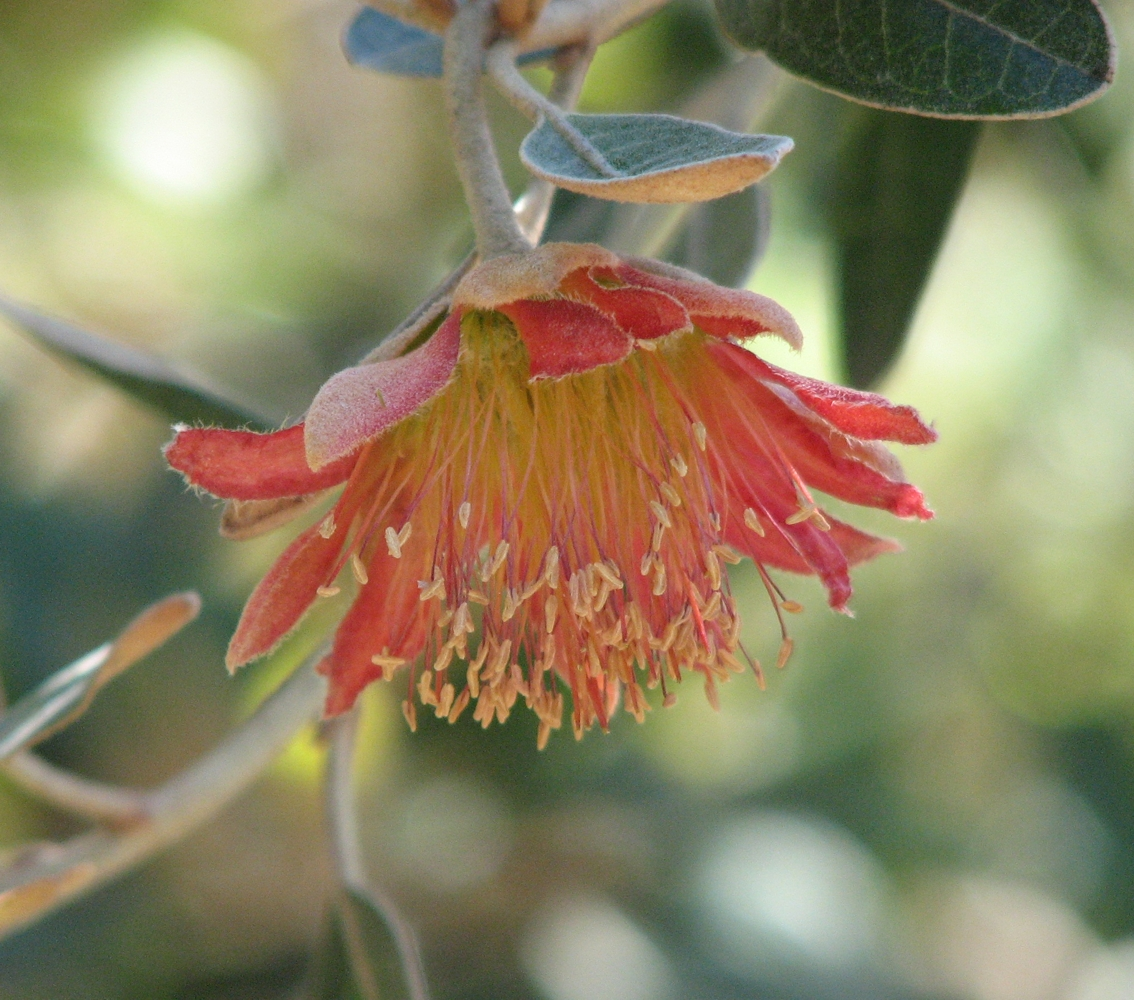
- Diplolaena grandiflora

Scientific classification
- Kingdom: Plantae
- Clade: Tracheophytes
- Clade: Angiosperms
- Clade: Eudicots
- Clade: Rosids
- Order: Sapindales
- Family: Rutaceae
- Subfamily: Zanthoxyloideae
- Genus: Diplolaena; R.Br.

Species
- See text

= Diplolaena =

Genus of flowering plants

Diplolaena is a genus of evergreen shrubs in the family Rutaceae, native to Western Australia.

Species include:

- Diplolaena andrewsii Ostenf.
- Diplolaena angustifolia Hook. — Yanchep rose
- Diplolaena cinerea Paul G.Wilson
- Diplolaena dampieri Desf.
- Diplolaena drummondii (Benth.) Ostenf.
- Diplolaena eneabbensis Paul G.Wilson
- Diplolaena ferruginea Paul G.Wilson
- Diplolaena geraldtonensis Paul G.Wilson
- Diplolaena grandiflora Desf. — wild rose
- Diplolaena graniticola Paul G.Wilson
- Diplolaena leemaniana Paul G.Wilson
- Diplolaena microcephala Bartl. — lesser diplolaena
- Diplolaena mollis Paul G.Wilson
- Diplolaena obovata Paul G.Wilson
- Diplolaena velutina (Paul G.Wilson) Paul G.Wilson
