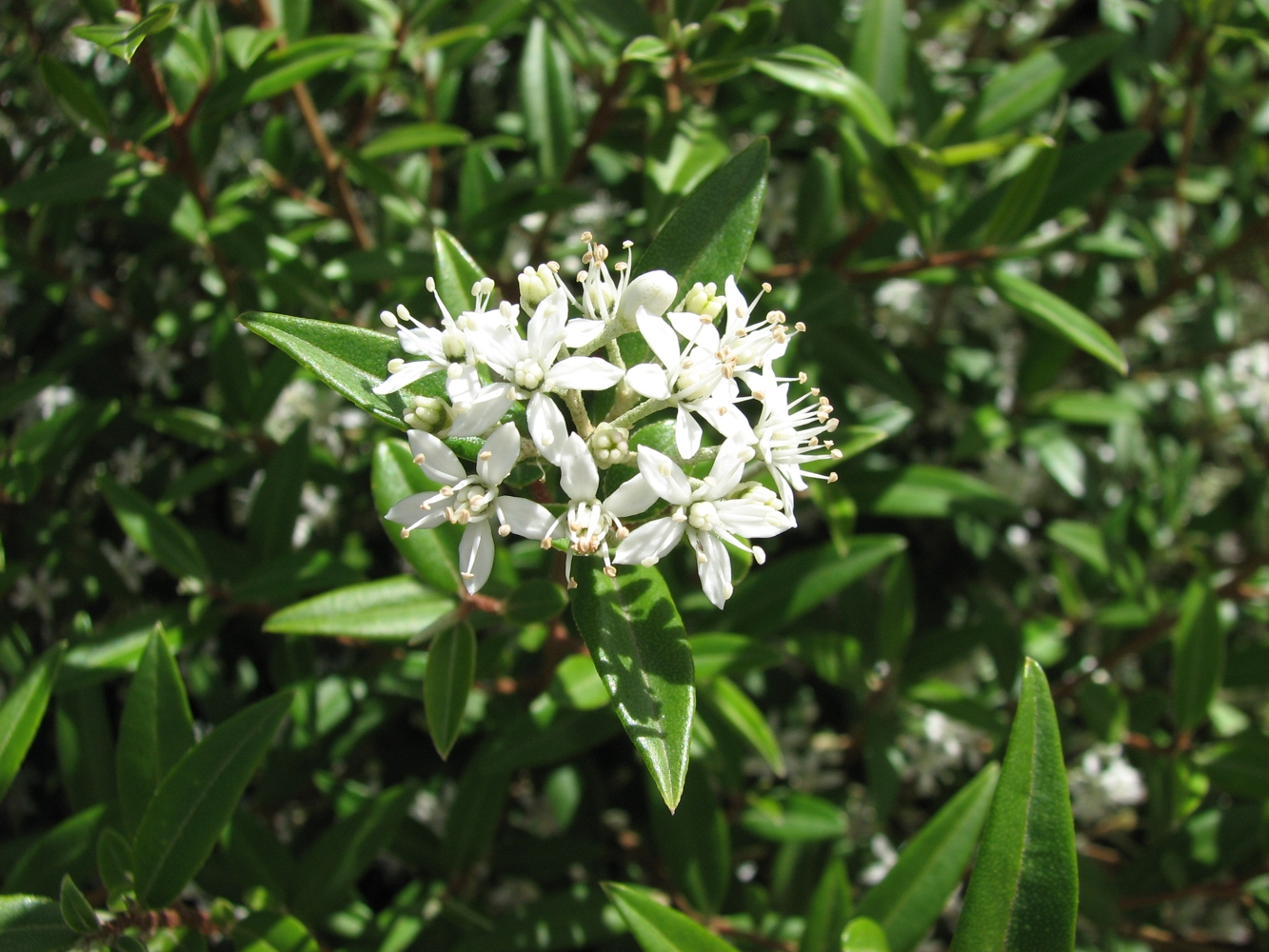

Scientific classification
- Kingdom: Plantae
- Clade: Tracheophytes
- Clade: Angiosperms
- Clade: Eudicots
- Clade: Rosids
- Order: Sapindales
- Family: Rutaceae
- Genus: Nematolepis
- Species: N. squamea

Binomial name
- Nematolepis squamea (Labill.) Paul G. Wilson

Synonyms
- Eriostemon squameus Labill.; Phebalium squameum (Labill) Engl.

= Nematolepis squamea =

Species of flowering plant

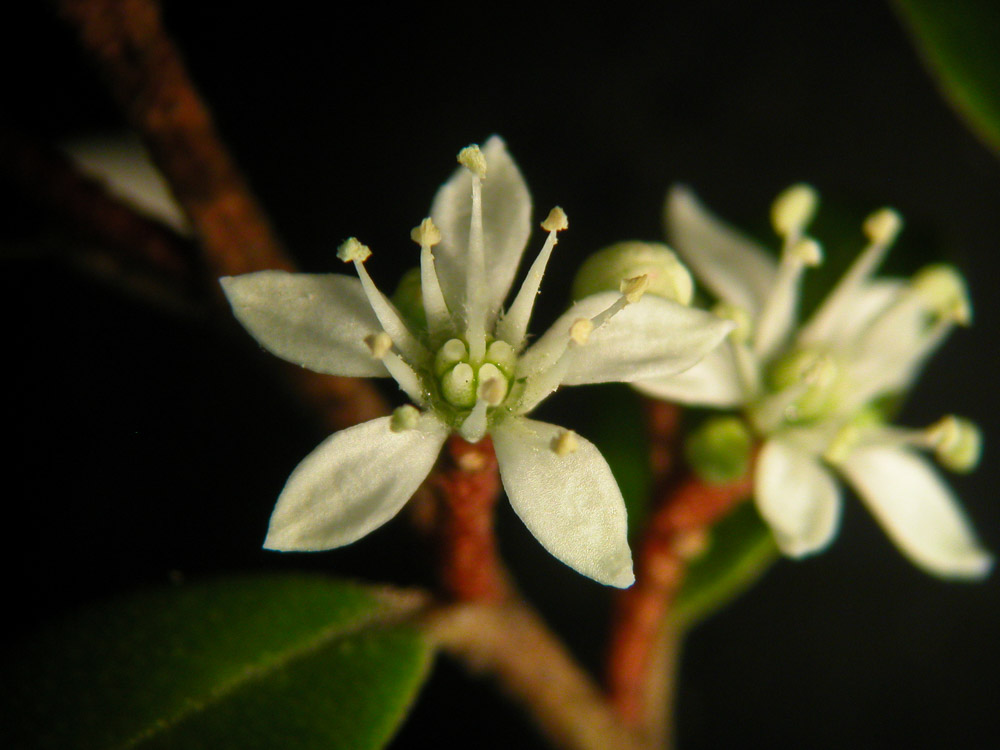
Flower showing five petals and stamens

Nematolepis squamea , commonly known as Satinwood, is an upright shrub or small tree species which is endemic to Australia.

== Description ==
Nematolepis squamea is an erect and conical shrub or small tree that grows to 12m in height. It has simple, entire and opposite leathery leaves which are glossy green above and silvery and scalic on the underside. They are lanceolate in shape with a prominent central mid-rib, typically 2.5–8 cm long by 2 cm wide. Stems of new growth are often a red/brown colour and covered in scales. The leaves contain oil glands and are aromatic when crushed. The individual white flowers are small; about 1 cm in diameter, however they can occur in conspicuous clusters of up to 20 in the leaf axils. Each flower has five petals and stamens and flowering occurs between October and December. Fruit capsules are star-like with four or five points.

The Tasmanian endemic subspecies retusa is always a found as a shrub, has a rounded leaf apex, shorter leaves and highly scaly, warty twigs.

== Taxonomy ==
The species was first formally described in 1805 and named Eriostemon squamea. It was transferred to the genus Phebalium in 1896 and subsequently to Nematolepis by Paul G. Wilson in 1998. The name is derived from the Greek words nematos 'thread', lepsis 'scale' and the Latin word squameus 'scaly' referring to the scales on the leaves, stems and stamens.

Three subspecies are currently recognised:

- N. squamea subsp. coriacea (Paul G.Wilson) Paul G.Wilson
- N. squamea subsp. retusa (Hook.) Paul G.Wilson
- N. squamea (Labill.) Paul G. Wilson subsp. squamea

== Distribution and habitat ==
Nematolepis squamea is found in moist, well-drained areas in Tasmania and south-eastern areas of mainland Australia. It is common in wet sclerophyll forests, rainforests, gullies and riverbanks from the coast to 800m altitude. It's found as a shrub in drier and more alpine areas.

== Uses ==
Satinwood (also known as lancewood in the timber industry) is a dense, hard timber, golden and silky in appearance. It is well-suited to wood turning and veneer, and has been used in cabinet making in the past.

== Cultivation ==
This is a hardy, reliable species for cultivation. It prefers moist, well-drained soil in a partly shaded spot. It can withstand moderate frost, but is intolerant to extensive dryness. Like other members of the Rutaceae, propagation is easiest from cuttings. It can be clipped and pruned to shape and used as a hedge or screen plant.
