= Nematolepis rhytidophylla =

Scientific classification
- Kingdom: Plantae
- Clade: Tracheophytes
- Clade: Angiosperms
- Clade: Eudicots
- Clade: Rosids
- Order: Sapindales
- Family: Rutaceae
- Genus: Nematolepis
- Species: N. rhytidophylla

Binomial name
- Nematolepis rhytidophylla (Albr. & N.G.Walsh) Paul G.Wilson

Synonyms
- Phebalium rhytidophyllum Albr. & N.G.Walsh

Species of shrub

Nematolepis rhytidophylla, is a dense shrub with angular stems, covered densely in coppery coloured scales, smooth, glossy leaves and white flowers in small clusters in winter and spring. It is endemic to New South Wales.

== Description ==
Nematolepis rhytidophylla is a dense shrub to 3 m (9.8 ft) high with angled, warty stems and thickly covered in coppery scales. The leaves are egg-shaped, 0.3–1.2 cm (0.12–0.47 in) long, 2.5–9.5 cm (0.98–3.74 in) wide, stiff, leathery, edges flat or rolled under, upper surface smooth, shiny, underside with silvery scales and notched at the apex. The inflorescence is a small cluster of 1-3 flowers in leaf axils, 2–7 mm (0.079–0.276 in) long, flower stems more or less flattened covered in coppery scales. The 1-4 small bracts oblong shaped, 1–2 mm (0.039–0.079 in) long, covered on the outside with coppery scales. The triangular shaped sepals are more or less fused at the base, mostly smooth, white and dotted with glands. The white petals 4–5 mm (0.16–0.20 in) long, smooth and dotted with glands. The dry, slightly spreading fruit capsule is about 3–3.2 mm (0.12–0.13 in) long, more or less square, smooth, warty and ending minutely with a triangular point. Flowering occurs in spring and summer.

== Taxonomy ==
This species was first formally described in 1998 by David Albrecht and Neville Walsh and named it Phebalium rhytidophyllum, and the description was published in the journal Muelleria. In 1998 Paul G.Wilson changed the name to Nematolepis rhytidophylla and the change published in Nuytsia.

== Distribution and habitat ==
Nematolepis rhytidophylla is an understorey shrub with a restricted distribution, found growing on the ranges between Wog Wog and White Rock Mountains southeast of Bombala growing in rocky, sclerophyll scrubland.

== Conservation status ==
Nematolepis rhytidophylla is considered "vulnerable" under the Environment Protection and Biodiversity Conservation Act 1999.
