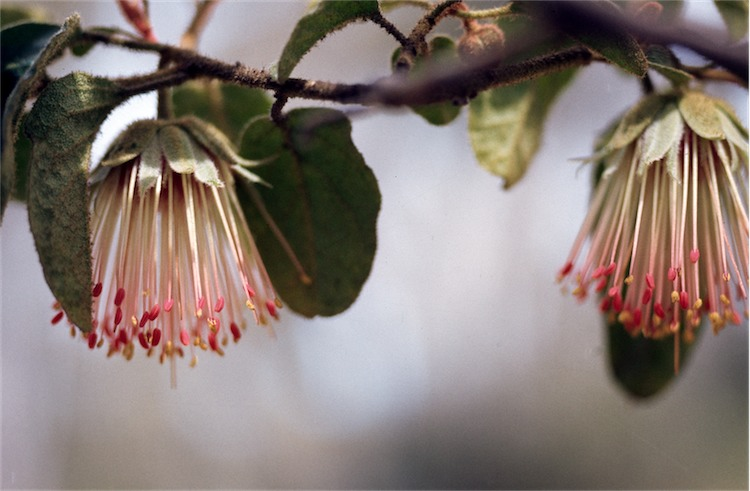

Scientific classification
- Kingdom: Plantae
- Clade: Tracheophytes
- Clade: Angiosperms
- Clade: Eudicots
- Clade: Rosids
- Order: Sapindales
- Family: Rutaceae
- Genus: Diplolaena
- Species: D. graniticola

Binomial name
- Diplolaena graniticola Paul G. Wilson

= Diplolaena graniticola =

Species of plant

Diplolaena graniticola, is a species of flowering plant in the family Rutaceae. It is a small shrub with yellow or red pendulous flowers and papery leaves. It is endemic to Western Australia.

== Description ==
Diplolaena graniticola is a shrub to 1.5 m (4 ft 11 in) high with smooth branchlets that are covered in scales or star-shaped hairs. The leaves are papery, arranged in pairs, simple, 10–35 mm (0.39–1.38 in) long, 6–15 mm (0.24–0.59 in) wide, smooth, covered in scales or star-shaped hairs, leaves and margins flat, apex rounded, petiole 3–7 mm (0.12–0.28 in) long, wedge-shaped at the base. The pendulous flowers are on a pedicel 3–5 mm (0.12–0.20 in) long and surrounded by bracts 9–12 mm (0.35–0.47 in) long, flower heads about 15 mm (0.59 in) in diameter. The corolla is yellow or red with five overlapping petals, 5.5–6 mm (0.22–0.24 in) long and hairy on the edges. Flowering occurs from July to October.

== Taxonomy and naming ==
Diplolaena graniticola was first formally described in 1998 by Paul G. Wilson and the description was published in the journal Nuytsia.The specific epithet (graniticola ) means "inhabiting granite".

== Distribution and habitat ==
This diplolaena mostly grows in granite outcrops east of Perth in the Darling Range from Mount Observation and south to Wagin and Collie.
