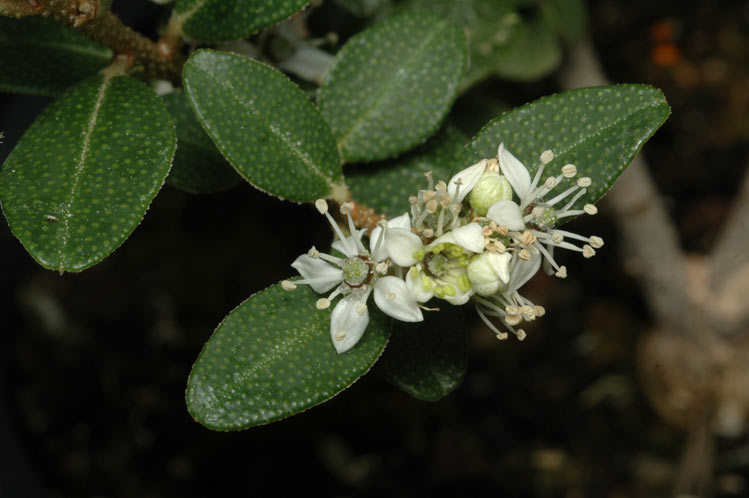

Scientific classification
- Kingdom: Plantae
- Clade: Tracheophytes
- Clade: Angiosperms
- Clade: Eudicots
- Clade: Rosids
- Order: Sapindales
- Family: Rutaceae
- Genus: Nematolepis
- Species: N. elliptica

Binomial name
- Nematolepis elliptica (Paul G.Wilson) Paul G.Wilson

= Nematolepis elliptica =

Species of shrub

Nematolepis elliptica, is a small, bushy shrub with white flowers in small clusters from September to November. It is endemic to the south coast of New South Wales.

== Description ==
Nematolepis elliptica is a small shrub to 1.5 m (4 ft 11 in) high with rounded, scaly, warty branches. The leaves are elliptic or oblong-oval, 20–35 mm (0.79–1.38 in) long, 8–15 mm (0.31–0.59 in) wide, margins flat, rounded to notched at the apex, papery, smooth on the upper surface, silvery scales on lower surface. The flowers are in groups of 2–5 in short cymes about 5 mm (0.20 in) long, both individual flower stalk and the cyme peduncle are thick and scaly. The small bracts are almost flattened, leaf-like, smaller near apex of branch and discarded early. The sepals triangular shaped, about 1 mm (0.039 in) long, fleshy and mostly smooth. The white petals elliptic shaped, slightly overlap, about 5 mm (0.20 in) long and smooth. The dry seed capsule is almost square, about 3 mm (0.12 in) high with a very small triangular point. Flowering occurs from September to November.

== Taxonomy ==
This species was first formally described in 1974 by Paul G. Wilson, the description was published in the journal Nuytsia and given the name Phebalium ellipticum. In 1998 Paul G. Wilson changed the name to Nematolepis elliptica and the name change was published in the journal Nuytsia.

== Distribution and habitat ==
Nematolepis elliptica has a restricted distribution in the ranges east of Cooma in New South Wales. It is found growing in shrubland and forests, usually amid rocky outcrops.
