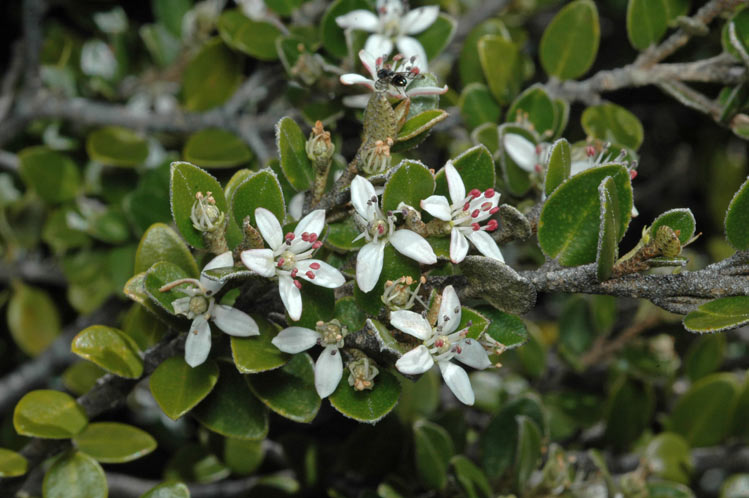

Scientific classification
- Kingdom: Plantae
- Clade: Embryophytes
- Clade: Tracheophytes
- Clade: Spermatophytes
- Clade: Angiosperms
- Clade: Eudicots
- Clade: Rosids
- Order: Sapindales
- Family: Rutaceae
- Genus: Nematolepis
- Species: N. ovatifolia

Binomial name
- Nematolepis ovatifolia (F.Muell.) Paul G.Wilson

Synonyms
- Phebalium ovatifolium F.Muell.

= Nematolepis ovatifolia =

Species of shrub

Nematolepis ovatifolia, is a small shrub with rusty coloured scales on the stems, smooth, glossy leaves and white flowers in small clusters in summer. It is endemic to New South Wales.

== Description ==
Nematolepis ovatifolia is a small, dense shrub with more or less angled to terete stems covered in light rust coloured scales and sparsely dotted with warty glands. The leaves are wide egg-shaped to broadly elliptic, 0.9–1.2 cm (0.35–0.47 in) long, 5–10 mm (0.20–0.39 in) wide, margins mostly flat, upper surface dotted with glands, underside silvery scales. The inflorescences are a small, tight cluster of 1-3 white flowers, petals about 4 mm (0.16 in) long, pink in bud, dotted with glands, individual flowers and cluster stems thick, flattened and together 2–4 mm (0.079–0.157 in) long. The bracts oblong to egg-shaped, 1–1.5 mm (0.039–0.059 in) long, sepals almost upright, triangular shape and 2 mm (0.079 in) long. The dry, erect' seed capsule is more or less square, about 3 mm (0.12 in) long with a short rounded point. Flowering occurs in summer.

== Taxonomy ==
This species was first formally described by Ferdinand von Mueller in 1855 and gave it the name Phebalium ovatifolium and the description published in Definitions of rare or hitherto undescribed Australian plants. In 1998, Paul G. Wilson changed the name to Nematolepis ovatifolia in the journal Nuytsia.

== Distribution and habitat ==
Nematolepis ovatifolia grows in low woodland on granite ridges in the alpine regions of the Kosciuszko National Park.
