= Nematolepis frondosa =

Conservation status
- Vulnerable (EPBC Act)

Scientific classification
- Kingdom: Plantae
- Clade: Tracheophytes
- Clade: Angiosperms
- Clade: Eudicots
- Clade: Rosids
- Order: Sapindales
- Family: Rutaceae
- Genus: Nematolepis
- Species: N. frondosa

Binomial name
- Nematolepis frondosa (N.G.Walsh & Albr.) Paul G.Wilson

Synonyms
- Phebalium frondosum N.G.Walsh & Albr.

Species of shrub

Nematolepis frondosa, commonly known as leafy nematolepis, is a shrub that is endemic to Victoria, Australia. It is a small, conical shaped shrub with glossy leaves, scaly branchlets and white flowers in winter and spring.

== Description ==
Nematolepis frondosa is a conical shaped shrub to 7 m (23 ft) high with branches usually spreading horizontally, branchlets densely covered in silvery or rusty coloured small scales. The smooth leaves are broadly egg-shaped, 8–23 mm (0.31–0.91 in) long, 6–15 mm (0.24–0.59 in) wide, papery texture, shiny, underside densely covered in silvery scales, margins flat, apex either blunt or slightly notched on a petiole 2–5 mm (0.079–0.197 in) long. The inflorescence is usually a single star-shaped flower or rarely a small group of 2–3, pendulous or curved downwards, individual flowers on a stalk 1–4 mm (0.039–0.157 in) long or cluster on a peduncle 4–9 mm (0.16–0.35 in) long, sepals are free, triangular shaped, 1.5–2.5 mm (0.059–0.098 in) long, scaly and barely joined at the base. The white petals overlap, elliptic shaped, 4–6 mm (0.16–0.24 in) long, glabrous and the stamens marginally shorter than the petals. The dry fruit is egg-shaped, smooth or with a few hairs, about 4 mm (0.16 in) long ending in a short triangular point. Flowering occurs in winter and spring.

== Taxonomy and naming ==
This species was first formally described in 1988 by Neville Walsh and David Albrecht, the description was published in the journal Muelleria from plant material collected at Mount Elizabeth and given the name Phebalium frondosum. The species was transferred to the genus Nematolepis in 1998 by Paul G. Wilson and the name change was published in the journal Nuytsia.

== Distribution and habitat ==
Leafy nematolepis is an understory shrub with a restricted distribution, found at higher altitudes between Bruthen and Ensay in eastern Victoria in a variety of habitats, from lower rocky outcrops in scrub to upper slopes of Mount Elizabeth in tall forests.

== Conservation status ==
Nematolepis frondosa is listed as "vulnerable" under the Commonwealth Environment Protection and Biodiversity Conservation Act 1999, "threatened" under the Victorian Flora and Fauna Guarantee Act 1988 and "vulnerable" on the Department of Sustainability and Environment's Advisory List of Rare Or Threatened Plants In Victoria.
