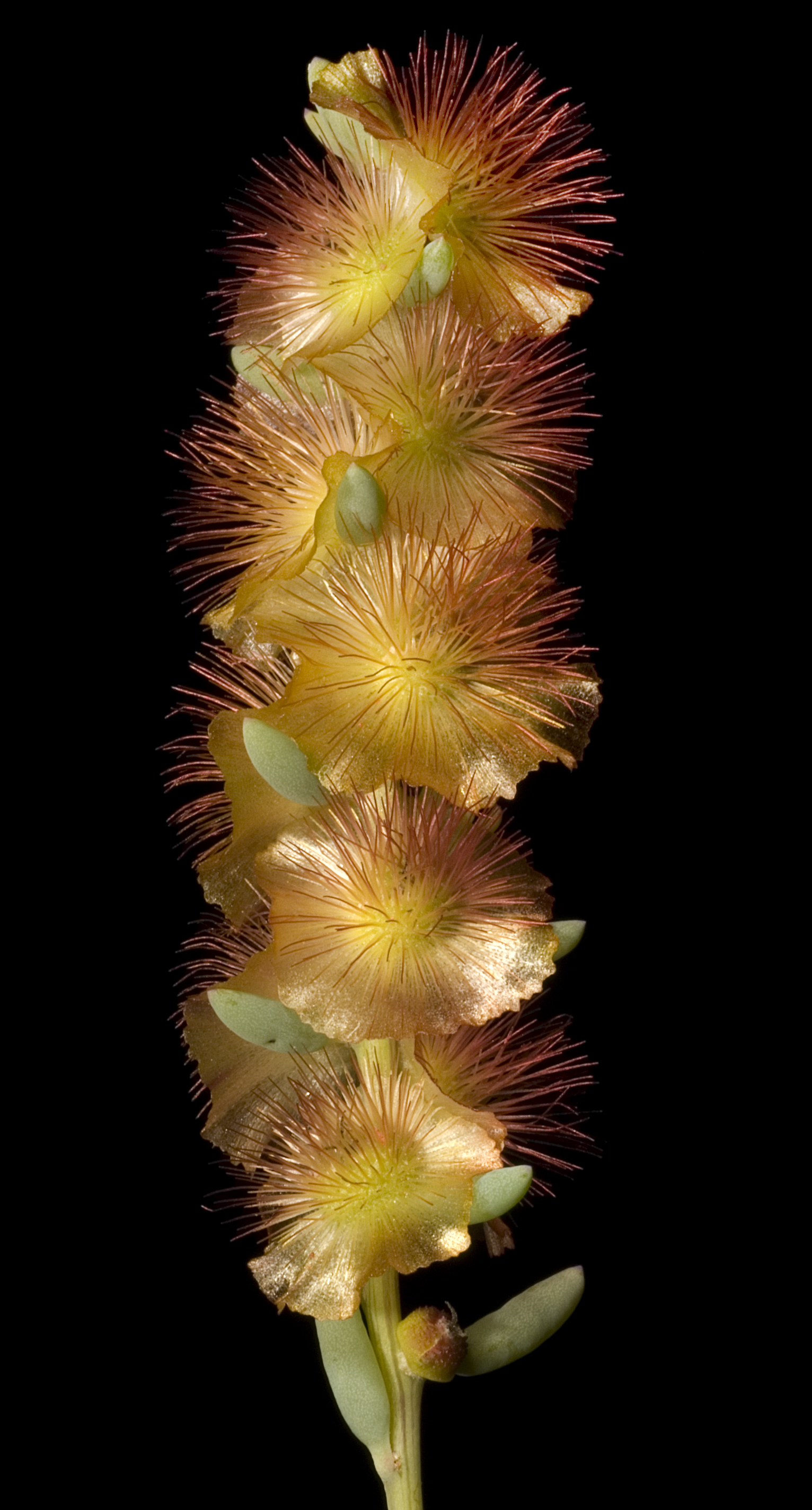

Scientific classification
- Kingdom: Plantae
- Clade: Tracheophytes
- Clade: Angiosperms
- Clade: Eudicots
- Order: Caryophyllales
- Family: Amaranthaceae
- Genus: Maireana
- Species: M. melanocoma

Binomial name
- Maireana melanocoma (F.Muell.) Paul G.Wilson

Synonyms
- Kochia melanocoma F.Muell.

= Maireana melanocoma =

Species of plant in the amaranth family

Maireana melanocoma, commonly known as pussy bluebush, is a species of flowering plant in the family Amaranthaceae and is endemic to the north-west of Western Australia. It is weak, diffuse, much-branched, mostly glabrous shrub with slender branches, more or less terete to spindle-shaped leaves, flowers in spike-like groups, and a glabrous pale green to gold or pale red fruiting perianth that turns black as it ages, with a horizontal wing covered with erect, hair-like processes.

== Description ==
Maireana melanocoma is a weak, diffuse, mostly glabrous, much-branched shrub with slender, striated branches and that typically grows to a height of up to 50 cm (20 in). The leaves are more or less terete to narrowly spindle-shaped, 10–20 mm (0.39–0.79 in) long with a sharp point. The flowers are arranged singly, but clustered in glabrous, spike-like clusters on the ends of branches. The fruiting perianth is glabrous, pale green to gold or pale red at first, later turning black, with a convex, thick-walled tube with a simple horizontal wing 12–16 mm (0.47–0.63 in) in diameter, the upper perianth covered with many erect, hair-like processes up to 6 mm (0.24 in) long.

== Taxonomy ==
This species was first formally described in 1882 by Ferdinand von Mueller who gave it the name Kochia melanocoma in his Fragmenta Phytographiae Australiae. In 1975, Paul Wilson transferred the species to Maireana as M. melanocoma in the journal Nuytsia. The specific epithet (melanocoma) means 'black hair', referring to the black, hair-like processes on the fruiting perianth.

== Distribution and habitat ==
Pussy bluebush grows in clay loam and rocky soils on hillslopes and a variety of other habitats in the Carnarvon, Gascoyne, Great Victoria Desert, Little Sandy Desert, Murchison and Pilbara bioregions of north-western Western Australia.
