= Diplolaena cinerea =

Scientific classification
- Kingdom: Plantae
- Clade: Tracheophytes
- Clade: Angiosperms
- Clade: Eudicots
- Clade: Rosids
- Order: Sapindales
- Family: Rutaceae
- Genus: Diplolaena
- Species: D. cinerea

Binomial name
- Diplolaena cinerea Paul G.Wilson

Species of plant

Diplolaena cinerea, is a species of flowering plant in the family Rutaceae and is endemic to the west coast of Western Australia. It has pale orange flowers, papery, elliptic shaped leaves that are covered in star-shaped hairs on the upper surface.

== Description ==
Diplolaena cinerea is a bushy shrub to 1.2 m (3 ft 11 in) high. The leaves are soft, papery, elliptic shaped with flat edges, wedge shaped at the base, rounded at the apex, usually 20–30 mm (0.79–1.18 in) long on a short petiole 4–8 mm (0.16–0.31 in) long. The leaf upperside has soft, silky, short, star-shaped hairs and moderately soft, silky and velvety on lower surface. The flowers are about 2 cm (0.79 in) in diameter, the outer bracts oval, about 10 mm (0.39 in) long, soft, grey, sharp or tapering to a point. The inner bracts are narrowly egg-shaped, slightly longer than outer bracts and densely covered with short, matted, grey hairs. The petals are 9 mm (0.35 in) long with tiny woolly hairs on edges, the stamens about 15 mm (0.59 in) long, green to pale orange, soft, weak, and star-shaped hairs toward the base. Flowering occurs from July to September.

== Taxonomy ==
This species was first formally described in 1998 by Paul G. Wilson and the description was published in the journal Nuytsia.

== Distribution and habitat ==
Diplolaena cinerea grows mostly in woodlands on gravelly or sandy soils over laterite from Mount Peron to Dandaragan near the west coast of Western Australia.
