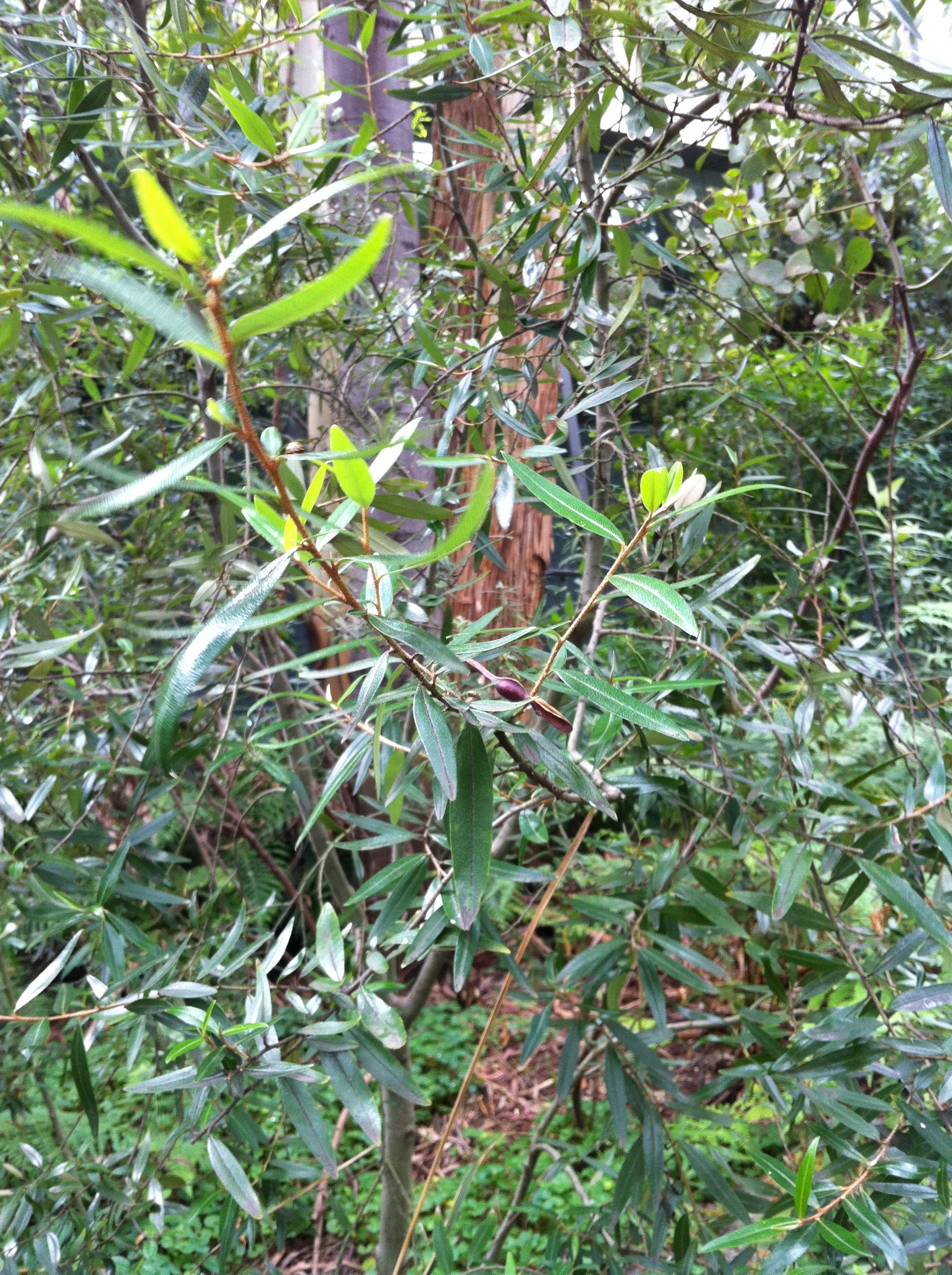

Conservation status
- Vulnerable (EPBC Act)

Scientific classification
- Kingdom: Plantae
- Clade: Tracheophytes
- Clade: Angiosperms
- Clade: Eudicots
- Clade: Rosids
- Order: Sapindales
- Family: Rutaceae
- Genus: Nematolepis
- Species: N. wilsonii

Binomial name
- Nematolepis wilsonii (N.G.Walsh & Albr.) Paul G. Wilson

Synonyms
- Phebalium wilsonii Benth.

= Nematolepis wilsonii =

Species of shrub

Nematolepis wilsonii (shiny nematolepis) is an endangered shrub or small tree species which is endemic to Victoria in Australia. It may grow up to 10 metres tall and has mottled bark. The shiny green leaves are 30 to 80 mm long and 5 to 15 mm wide, and have silvery scales underneath. Star-shaped white flowers are produced in groups of 1 to 9 in the leaf axils in spring.

The species was first formally described in 1988 and named Phebalium wilsonii The species was transferred to the genus Nematolepis by Paul G. Wilson in 2003.

The species is listed as "vulnerable" under the Environment Protection and Biodiversity Conservation Act and "threatened" under the Victorian Flora and Fauna Guarantee Act. The only known population, near Marysville was destroyed by the Black Saturday bushfires. Plants were subsequently established in a nearby catchment using seed from the Millennium Seed Bank.
