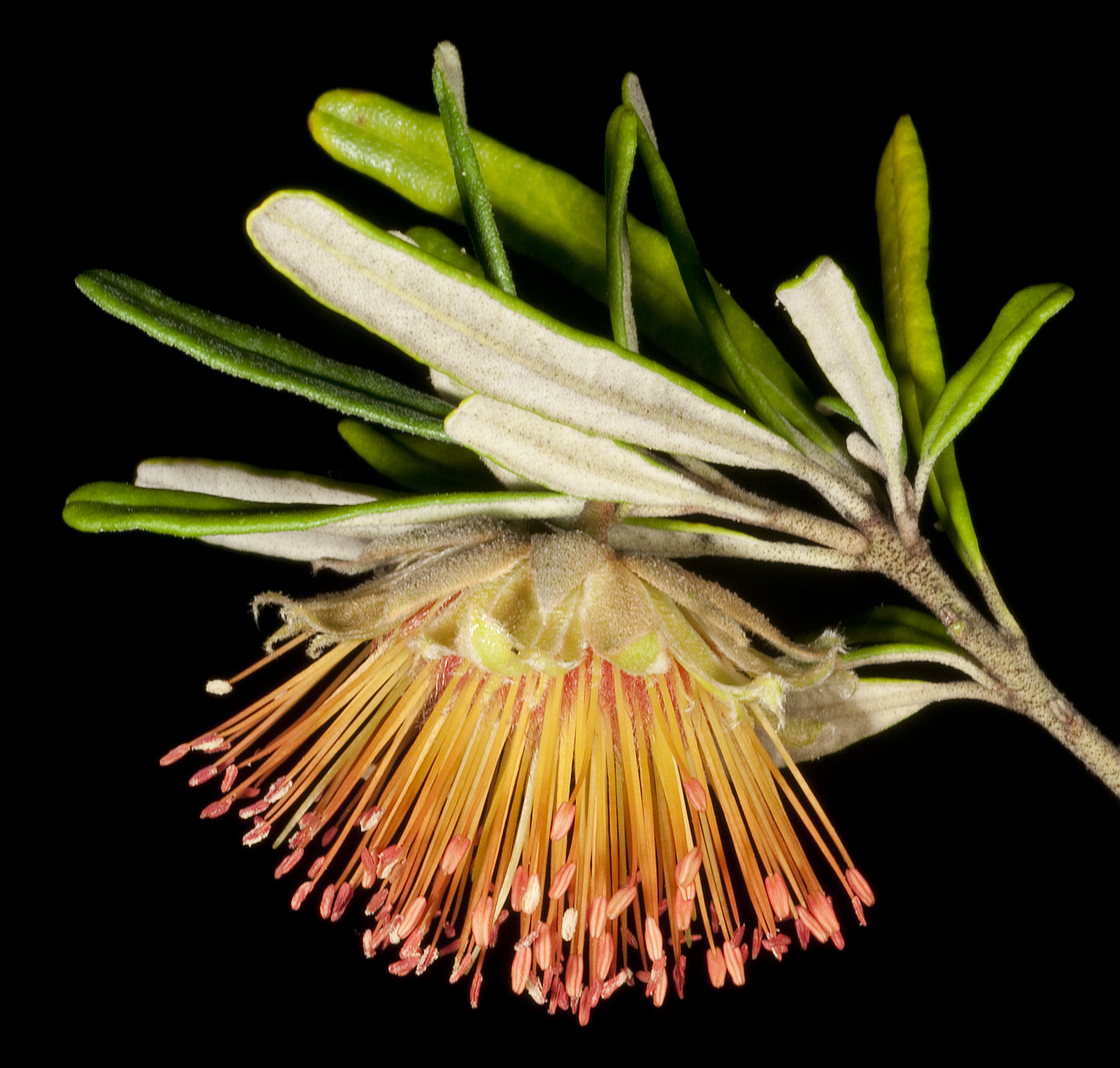

Scientific classification
- Kingdom: Plantae
- Clade: Tracheophytes
- Clade: Angiosperms
- Clade: Eudicots
- Clade: Rosids
- Order: Sapindales
- Family: Rutaceae
- Genus: Diplolaena
- Species: D. angustifolia

Binomial name
- Diplolaena angustifolia Hook.

= Diplolaena angustifolia =

Species of flowering plant

Diplolaena angustifolia, commonly known as Yanchep rose, is a shrub which is endemic to the area around Perth in Western Australia.

== Description ==
The shrub has an erect to compact to spreading habit and typically grows to a height of 0.3 to 1.5 m (1 ft 0 in to 4 ft 11 in). It has linear to narrowly oblong shaped leaves with a recurved to revolute margin. The Yanchep Rose has many small flowers with long bright stamens that are crowded in to heads surrounded by three or four series of petal-like bracts, so that the whole resembles a many-stamened single flower. Diplolaena angustifolia has pendant heads up to 3 to 4 cm (1.2 to 1.6 in) across, surrounded by a series of bracts. It features stamens of up to 3 cm (1.2 in) long which range in colour from a pale orange to crimson. It is a winter-flowering shrub that usually blooms between June and October.

== Taxonomy ==
The species was first formally described by the botanist William Jackson Hooker in the work Botanical Magazine published in 1843. Synonyms include; Diplolaena salicifolia, Diplolaena salicifolia var. revoluta and Diplolaena salicifolia var. salicifolia.

== Distribution ==
It has a scattered distribution along the coast and slightly inland from the Perth area in the south to as far north as Dongara in the Wheatbelt region of Western Australia. The shrub is often found on sand dunes, limestone hills and rocky ridges growing in sandy soils.
