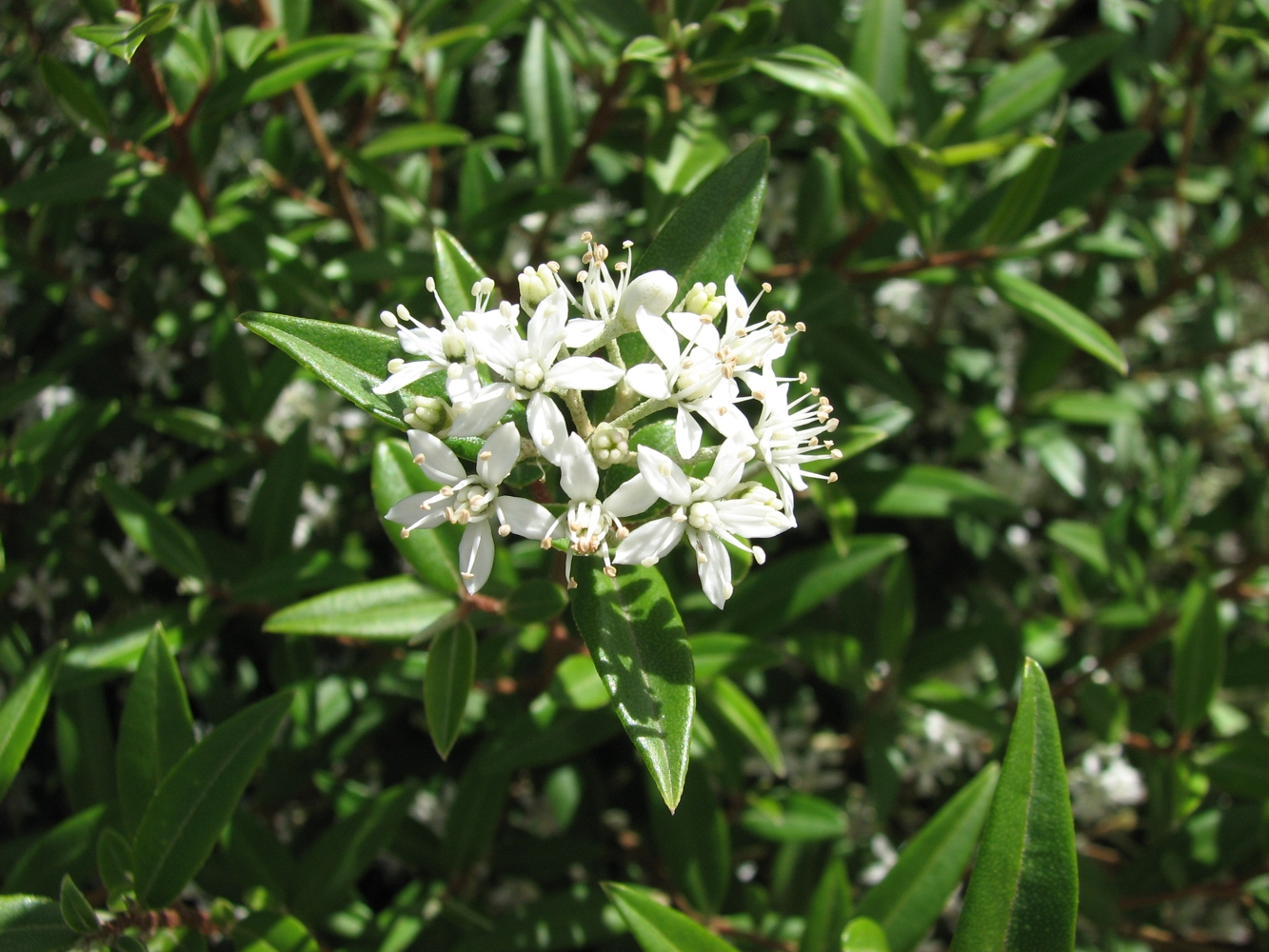
- Nematolepis squamea

Scientific classification
- Kingdom: Plantae
- Clade: Embryophytes
- Clade: Tracheophytes
- Clade: Spermatophytes
- Clade: Angiosperms
- Clade: Eudicots
- Clade: Rosids
- Order: Sapindales
- Family: Rutaceae
- Subfamily: Zanthoxyloideae
- Genus: Nematolepis; Turcz.

Species
- See text.

Synonyms
- Phebalium sect. Eriostemoides Endl.; Symphyopetalon J.Drumm. ex Harv.; Symphyopetalum F.Muell. orth. var.

= Nematolepis =

Genus of shrubs

Nematolepis is a genus of seven species of plants in the family Rutaceae, all endemic to Australia. They are shrubs or small trees with more or less flat leaves arranged alternately and flowers with five overlapping petals and ten stamens. Six species are found in eastern Australia and one in Western Australia.

== Description ==
Plants in the genus Nematolepis are shrubs or small trees with their stems, leaves and sepals covered with shield-like scales. The leaves are simple and arranged alternately. The flowers are arranged singly or in cymes in leaf axils, and have five sepals, five partly overlapping petals and ten stamens, all free from each other in most species. The five carpels are free from each other, each with two ovules and the stigma is not differentiated from the style. The fruit usually has a single seed in each of the five follicles.

== Taxonomy ==
The genus Nematolepis was first formally described in 1852 by Nikolai Turczaninow in the Bulletin de la Société Impériale des Naturalistes de Moscou and the first species described was Nematolepis phebalioides.

== Species list ==
The Australian Plant Census accepted seven species as at July 2020:

- Nematolepis elliptica (Paul G.Wilson) Paul G.Wilson (N.S.W.)
- Nematolepis frondosa (N.G.Walsh & Albr.) Paul G.Wilson — leafy nematolepis (Vic.)
- Nematolepis ovatifolia (F.Muell.) Paul G.Wilson (N.S.W.)
- Nematolepis phebalioides Turcz. (W.A.)
- Nematolepis rhytidophylla (Albr. & N.G.Walsh) Paul G.Wilson (N.S.W.)
- Nematolepis squamea (Labill.) Paul G.Wilson — satinwood, lancewood satin box, satin box, lancewood or bobie bobie (Qld., N.S.W., Vic., Tas.)
  - Nematolepis squamea subsp. coriacea (Paul G.Wilson) Paul G.Wilson
  - Nematolepis squamea (Turcz.) Paul G.Wilson subsp. squamea (Paul G.Wilson) Paul G.Wilson
- Nematolepis wilsonii (N.G.Walsh & Albr.) Paul G.Wilson (Vic. - extinct)
