= Ptilotus wilsonii =

Conservation status
- Priority One — Poorly Known Taxa (DEC)

Scientific classification
- Kingdom: Plantae
- Clade: Tracheophytes
- Clade: Angiosperms
- Clade: Eudicots
- Order: Caryophyllales
- Family: Amaranthaceae
- Genus: Ptilotus
- Species: P. wilsonii

Binomial name
- Ptilotus wilsonii Benl

Species of plant

Ptilotus wilsonii is a species of flowering plant of the family Amaranthaceae and is endemic to parts of arid inland northern Western Australia. It is a single-stemmed hairy shrub with stem leaves arranged alternately, and oval spikes of green or white, densely arranged flowers.

== Description ==
Ptilotus wilsonii is a single-stemmed, more or less erect, hairy shrub with stem leaves arranged alternately, and oval spikes of green or white, densely arranged flowers. The bracts are 2.5–3.3 mm (0.098–0.130 in) long with a prominent midrib, the bracteoles 3.4–4.0 mm (0.13–0.16 in) long with an obscure midrib. The outer tepals are 4.9–5.5 mm (0.19–0.22 in) long, and the inner tepals mostly 4.5–5.0 mm (0.18–0.20 in) long. The style is straight, 1.5–2.1 mm (0.059–0.083 in) long and fixed to the centre of the ovary. The seeds are glossy brown, 1.4–1.6 mm (0.055–0.063 in) long.

== Taxonomy ==
Ptilotus wilsonii was first formally described in 1975 by Gerhard Benl in the journal Mitteilungen der Botanischen Staatssammlung Munchen from specimens collected by Paul Graham Wilson near the Rudall River about 500 km (310 mi) south of Broome in 1971. The specific epithet (wilsonii) honours the collector of the type specimens.

== Distribution and habitat ==
This species of Ptilotus grows on rocky hills in stony, gravelly soils in the Little Sandy Desert and Pilbata bioregions of north-western Western Australia.

== Conservation status ==
Ptilotus wilsonii is listed as 'Priority One' by the Government of Western Australia Department of Biodiversity, Conservation and Attractions, meaning that it is known from only one or a few locations where it is potentially at risk.
