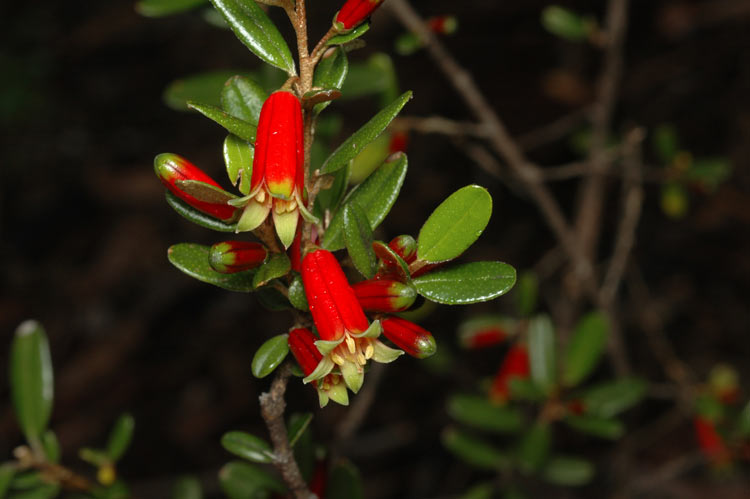

Scientific classification
- Kingdom: Plantae
- Clade: Tracheophytes
- Clade: Angiosperms
- Clade: Eudicots
- Clade: Rosids
- Order: Sapindales
- Family: Rutaceae
- Genus: Nematolepis
- Species: N. phebalioides

Binomial name
- Nematolepis phebalioides Turcz.

= Nematolepis phebalioides =

Species of shrub

Nematolepis phebalioides is a small, spreading shrub with ascending branches covered in scales, smooth, glossy leaves and pendulous, red tubular flowers with yellow or green tips, flowering from March to December. It is endemic to Western Australia.

== Description ==
Nematolepis phebalioides is an upright shrub to 3 m (9.8 ft) high. The leaves are on ascending branches on a short petiole, elliptic to broadly elliptic shaped, about 15 mm (0.59 in) long, leathery, smooth, glossy on the upper surface, grey scales on underside and rounded at the apex. The flowers are borne singly in leaf axils, corolla tubular about 15 mm (0.59 in) spreading, pendulous, on a pedicel about 3 mm (0.12 in) long with small bracts, boat-shaped and close to the base of the calyx. The sepals are triangular or rounded, about 1.5 mm (0.059 in) long, smooth or with occasional scales. The red, smooth, bell-shaped floral tube is 10–15 mm (0.39–0.59 in) long, 5 petalled with short yellow or green lobes and yellow stamens. The dry fruit capsule is about 5 mm (0.20 in) high, square, finely wrinkled and ending in a short triangular point. Flowering occurs sporadically throughout the year, mostly in winter.

== Taxonomy ==
This species was first formally described by Nicolai Turczaninow in 1852 and the description was published in Bulletin de la Société Impériale des Naturalistes de Moscou.

== Distribution and habitat ==
Nematolepis phebalioides is endemic to the south coast of Western Australia from Dumbleyung and east to Israelite Bay. It grows in loam, clay, coastal limestone, sand dunes and on lateritic hills and in mallee thickets.
