= Diplolaena drummondii =

Scientific classification
- Kingdom: Plantae
- Clade: Tracheophytes
- Clade: Angiosperms
- Clade: Eudicots
- Clade: Rosids
- Order: Sapindales
- Family: Rutaceae
- Genus: Diplolaena
- Species: D. drummondii

Binomial name
- Diplolaena drummondii (Benth.) Ostenf.

Species of plant

Diplolaena drummondii is an endemic Australian flowering plant in the family Rutaceae. It is only found in Western Australia. It is a small, spreading shrub with oblong to elliptic papery, thin leaves, and yellow, orange or reddish flowers which bloom between July and November.

== Description ==
Diplolaena drummondii is a small, spreading shrub to 1 m (3 ft 3 in) high with papery, elliptic to oblong-elliptic leaves 20–50 mm (0.79–1.97 in) long, margins flat, wedge shaped at the base, rounded at the apex on a petiole 5–15 mm (0.20–0.59 in) long. The leaf upper surface is covered sparsely with short, soft hairs, the underside sparsely to moderately covered with star-shaped hairs. The flowerheads about 15 mm (0.59 in) in diameter, the outer green to reddish brown bracts are egg-shaped to narrowly triangular, about 8 mm (0.31 in) long, covered in star-shaped, soft, short hairs. The inner bracts are about 12 mm (0.47 in) long, narrowly oblong, covered in soft, short, star-shaped hairs that taper gradually to a point. The pale red flower petals about 9 mm (0.35 in) long and covered in smooth, short, star-shaped hairs and taper to a point. The red or yellow stamens are about 25 mm (0.98 in) long, and covered with star-shaped, soft, weak hairs toward the base. The flower petals about 9 mm (0.35 in) long, light red with star-shaped, soft, smooth hairs. Flowering occurs from July to November.

== Taxonomy ==
Diplolaena drummondii was first formally described in 1863 by George Bentham who gave it the name Diplolaena microcephala var. drummondii in Flora Australiensis. In 1921 Carl Hansen Ostenfeld raised the variety to species status as Diplolaena drummondii and the change was published in Contributions to West Australian Botany, part III : Additions and notes to the flora of extra-tropical W. Australia. Biologiske meddelelser, Kongelige Danske Videnskabernes Selskab.

== Distribution and habitat ==
This species grows in woodland near Mundaring and Collie in the Darling Range.
