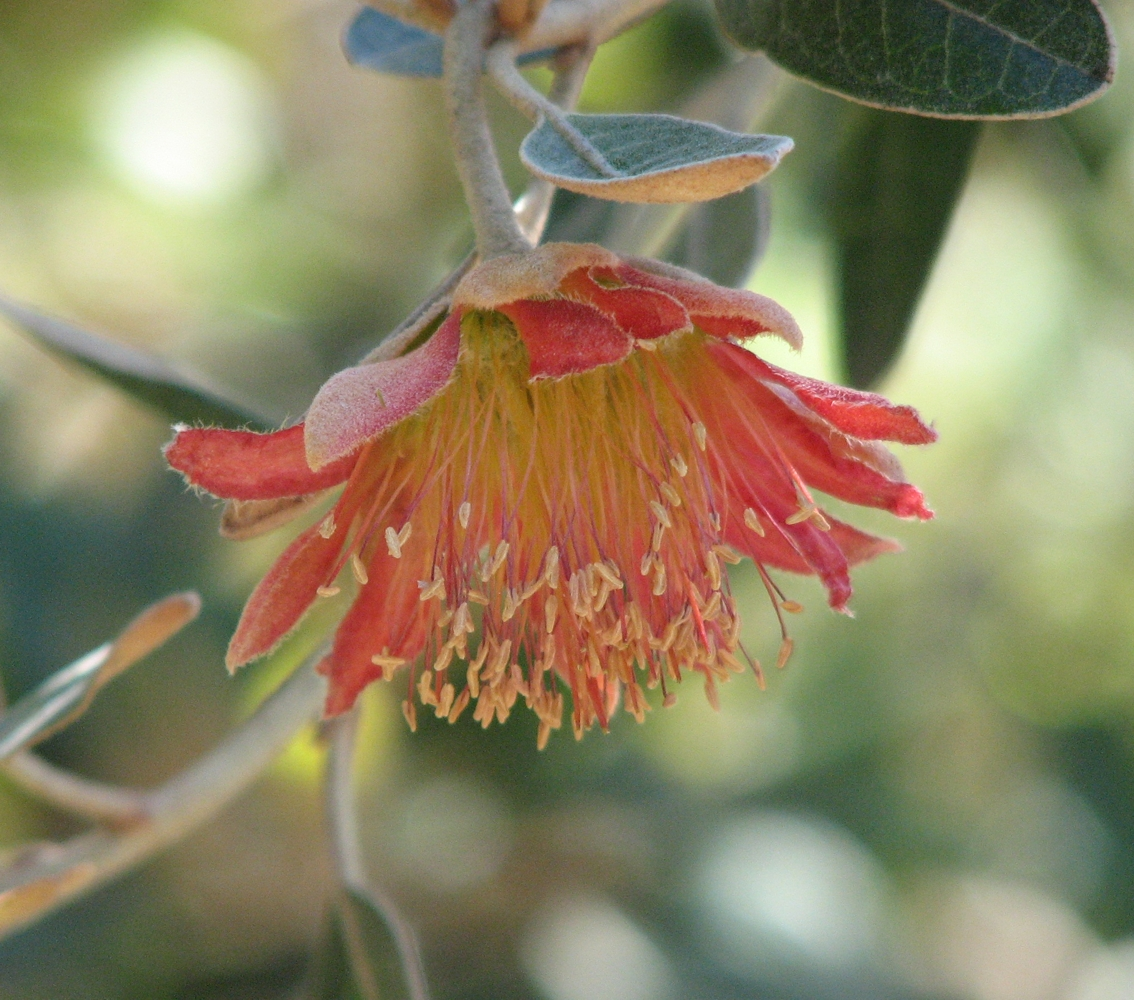

Scientific classification
- Kingdom: Plantae
- Clade: Tracheophytes
- Clade: Angiosperms
- Clade: Eudicots
- Clade: Rosids
- Order: Sapindales
- Family: Rutaceae
- Genus: Diplolaena
- Species: D. grandiflora

Binomial name
- Diplolaena grandiflora Desf.

= Diplolaena grandiflora =

Species of flowering plant

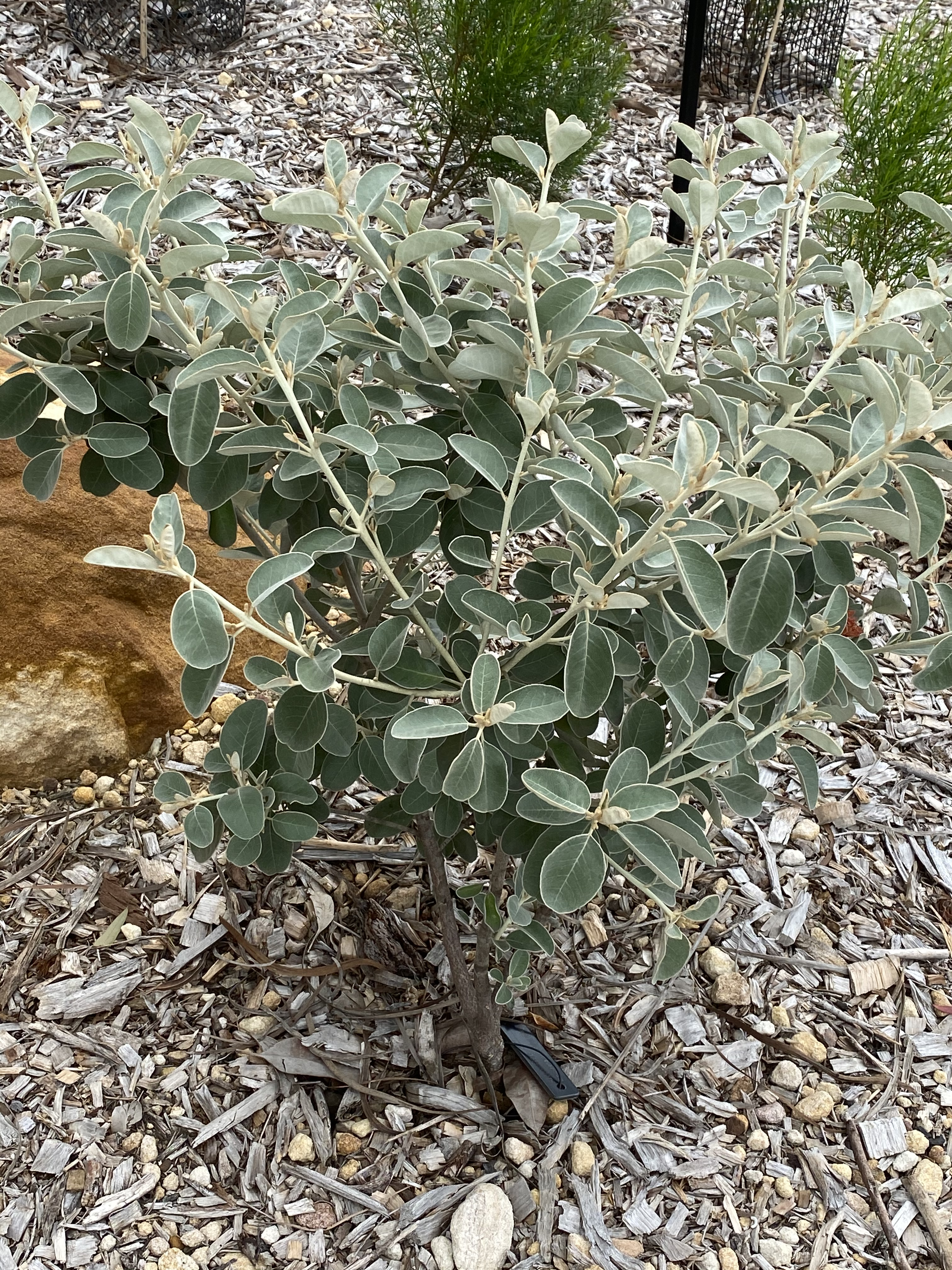
Habit

Diplolaena grandiflora, commonly known as wild rose or Tamala rose, is a shrub which is endemic to Western Australia.

== Description ==
Diplolaena grandiflora grows to between 0.5 and 3 metres high and has an erect habit. In a period between late autumn and spring, it produces showy, upright or pendant flowers. These have a cluster of red stamens in the centre, surrounded by pinkish-red bracts. The leaves are ovate and are up to 5 cm in length and are dark green on the top and downy on the undersides.

== Distribution ==
Diplolaena grandiflora occurs on limestone outcrops and ridges in an area between Geraldton and North West Cape.

== Taxonomy ==
Despite its common name of "wild rose", it is not closely related to the rose, but rather it is placed in the family Rutaceae.

The first known scientific collection of the species was by William Dampier during a voyage to New Holland in 1699. The type specimen was collected in 1801 from Dirk Hartog Island during a French voyage of exploration captained by Jacques Hamelin and Nicholas Baudin. The specimen was brought back to France and described by René Desfontaines in 1817, who gave it the specific epithet of grandiflora meaning "large-flowered".

== Cultivation ==
Propagation is by cuttings or from seed. It prefers good drainage and part shade and requires pruning to enhance flower production.
