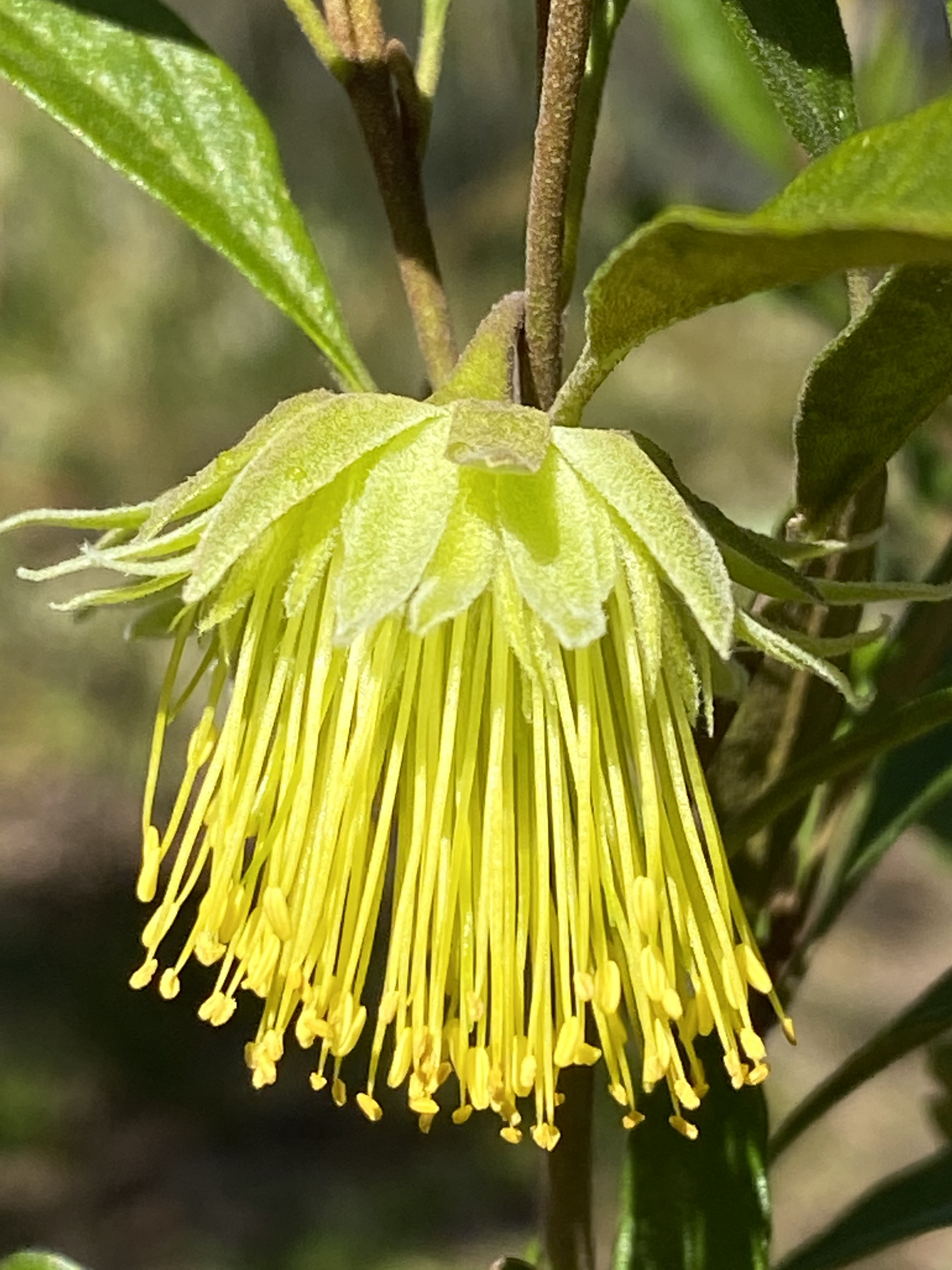

Scientific classification
- Kingdom: Plantae
- Clade: Tracheophytes
- Clade: Angiosperms
- Clade: Eudicots
- Clade: Rosids
- Order: Sapindales
- Family: Rutaceae
- Genus: Diplolaena
- Species: D. microcephala

Binomial name
- Diplolaena microcephala Bartl

= Diplolaena microcephala =

Species of plant

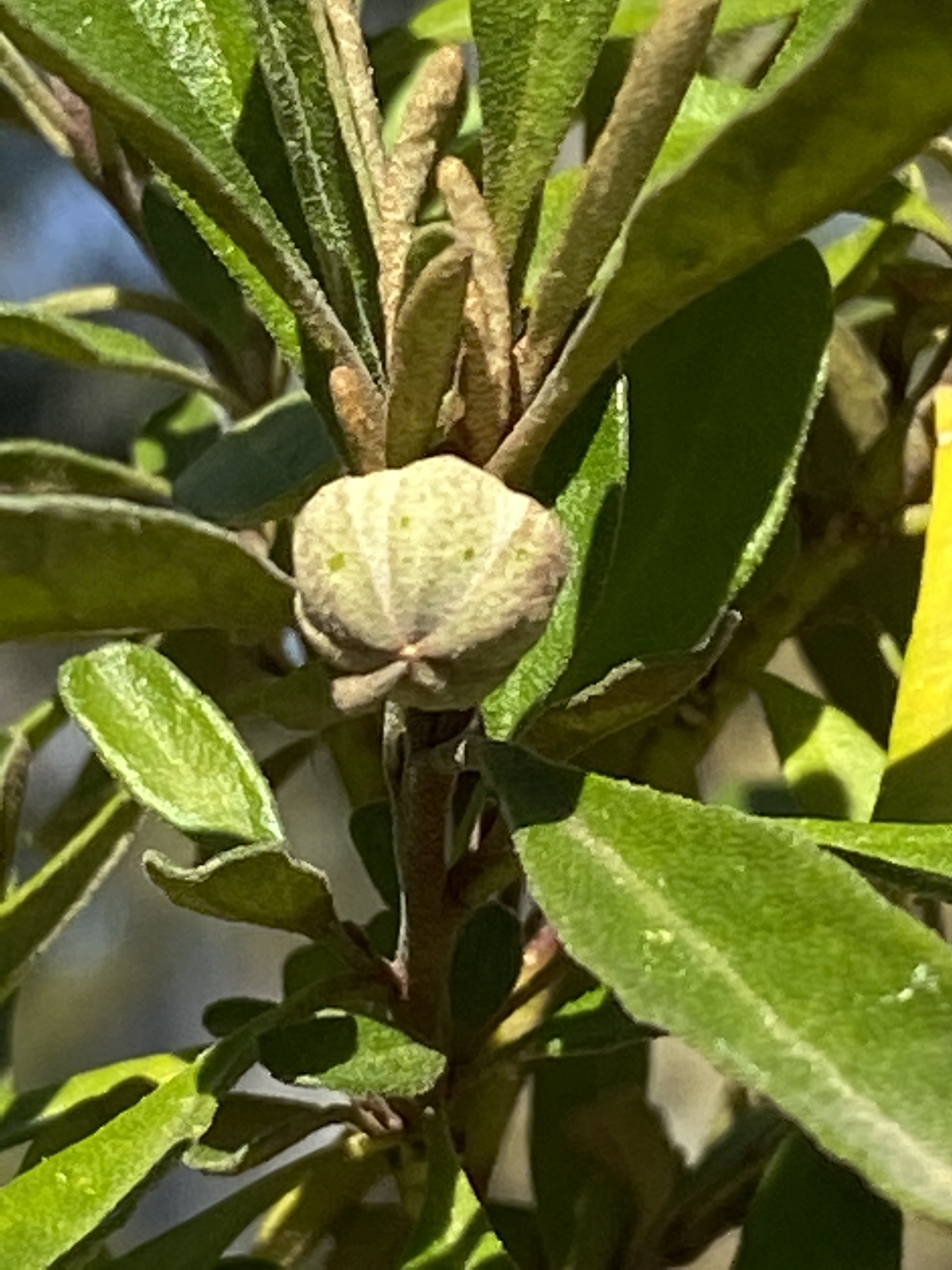
Flower bud and foliage

Diplolaena microcephala is a rounded shrub with elliptic leaves, distinctive stamens, variable flower colour and is endemic to Western Australia.

== Description ==
Diplolaena microcephala, commonly known as lesser diplolaena, is a rounded, spreading shrub about 1.5 m (4 ft 11 in) high and similar width. The grey-green leaves are elliptic shaped, margins folded inwards, up to 30–40 mm (1.2–1.6 in) long on a petiole 2–4 mm (0.079–0.157 in) long. The leaf upper surface is sparsely covered with large rusty coloured star-shaped hairs, the underside moderately covered with stiff, large rusty coloured star shaped hairs. The outer bracts are egg-shaped to triangular, 6–10 mm (0.24–0.39 in) long, covered with short, soft, rusty coloured hairs. The inner bracts narrowly oblong to narrowing triangular, slightly longer than outer bracts. The pendulous flowers are 25 mm (0.98 in) across, with prominent stamens 15–20 mm (0.59–0.79 in) long and vary in colour from red-green, red-orange or pinkish and are borne at the end of branches. Flowering occurs sporadically throughout the year.

== Taxonomy ==
Diplolaena microcephala was first formally described in 1845 by Friedrich Gottlieb Bartling and the description was published in Plantae Preissianae.

== Distribution and habitat ==
Lesser diplolaena grows near the south coast of Western Australia from near Walpole, east to near Hopetoun and east of Esperance. It grows in sand, gravelly soils and rocky loam near river banks and on granite hills.
