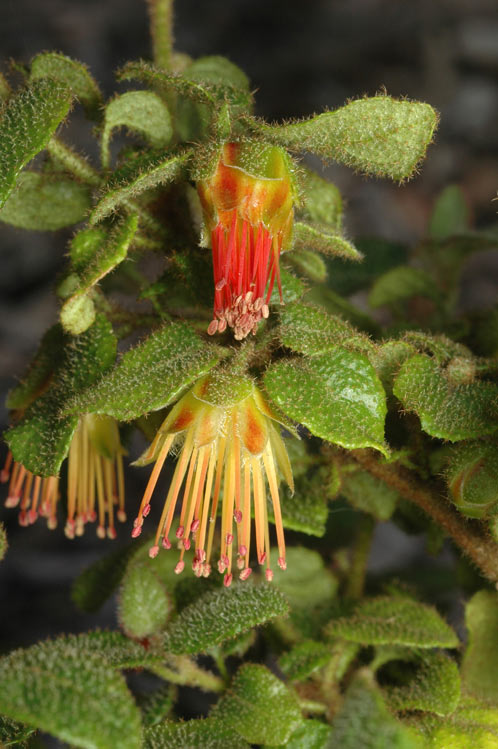
- In Kings Park, Perth

Scientific classification
- Kingdom: Plantae
- Clade: Tracheophytes
- Clade: Angiosperms
- Clade: Eudicots
- Clade: Rosids
- Order: Sapindales
- Family: Rutaceae
- Genus: Diplolaena
- Species: D. andrewsii

Binomial name
- Diplolaena andrewsii Ostenf.

= Diplolaena andrewsii =

Species of plant

Diplolaena andrewsii, is a species of flowering plant in the family Rutaceae and is endemic to the west coast of Western Australia.

== Description ==
Diplolaena andrewsii is a wide spreading branched shrub to 1 m (3 ft 3 in) high. The leaves heart to egg-shaped, 1.5–4 cm (0.59–1.57 in) long, papery, sparsely covered on both sides with star-shaped, coarse, rough hairs, rounded at the apex, on a petiole 4–10 mm (0.16–0.39 in) long. The flowerheads are up to 1.5 cm (0.59 in) in diameter, outer bracts broadly oval, about 8 mm (0.31 in) long, green, rounded, papery and sparsely covered in star-shaped hairs. The inner bracts are marginally longer than outer bracts, broadly egg-shaped to narrowly oblong, reddish-brown with white edges and smooth on the outer side. The petals are more or less equal in length to inner bracts, smooth or with small hairs. The stamens 10–14 mm (0.39–0.55 in) long with light red hairs on lower half. Flowering occurs from July to September.

== Taxonomy ==
This species was first formally described in 1921 by Carl Hansen Ostenfeld and the description was published in Biologiske Meddelelser, the journal of The Royal Danish Academy of Sciences and Letters.

== Distribution and habitat ==
This species in found in the Darling Range near Perth, Western Australia growing in granite rocks in woodland.
