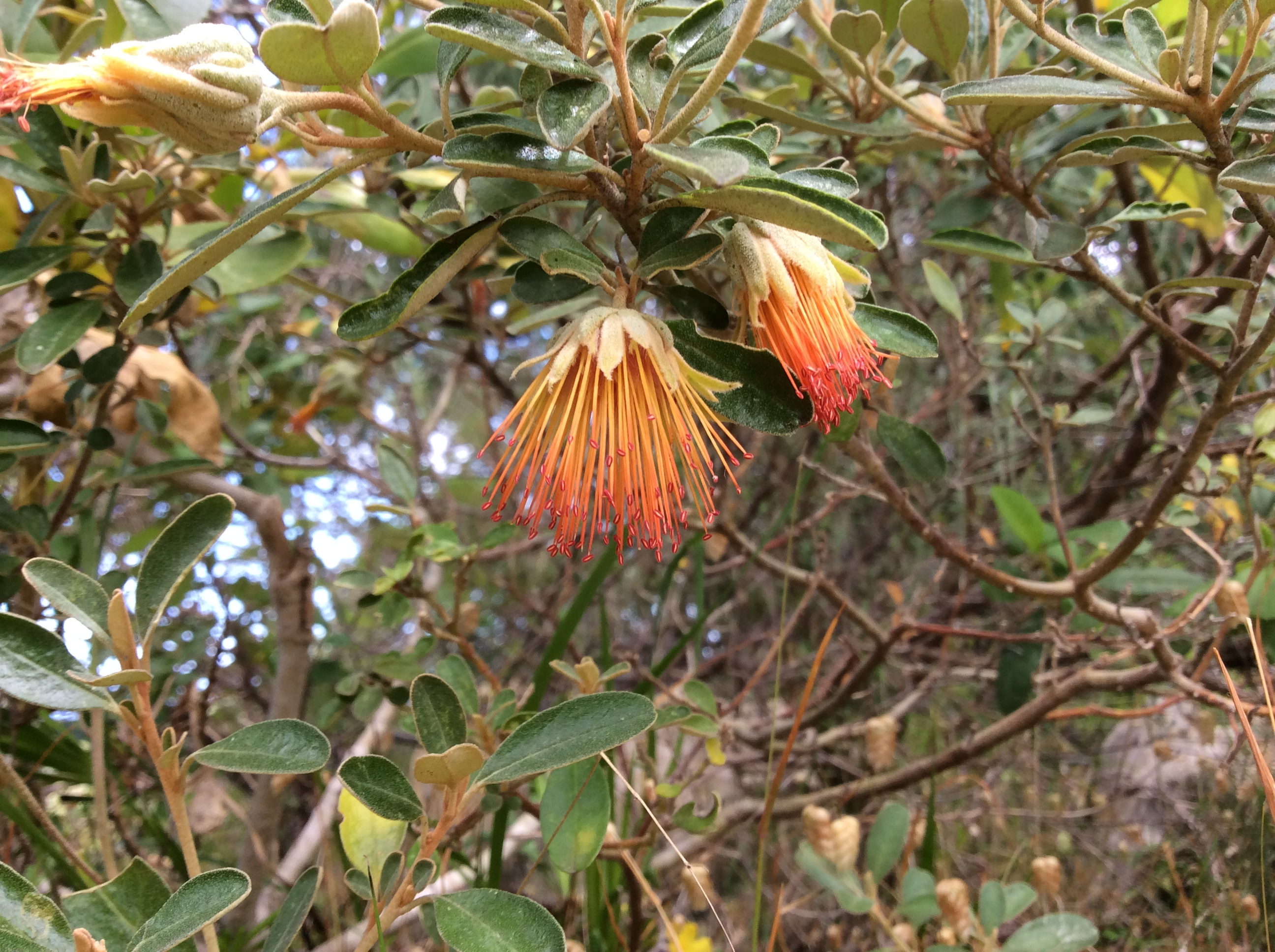
- Near the Cape Naturaliste Lighthouse

Scientific classification
- Kingdom: Plantae
- Clade: Tracheophytes
- Clade: Angiosperms
- Clade: Eudicots
- Clade: Rosids
- Order: Sapindales
- Family: Rutaceae
- Genus: Diplolaena
- Species: D. dampieri

Binomial name
- Diplolaena dampieri Desf.

= Diplolaena dampieri =

Species of plant

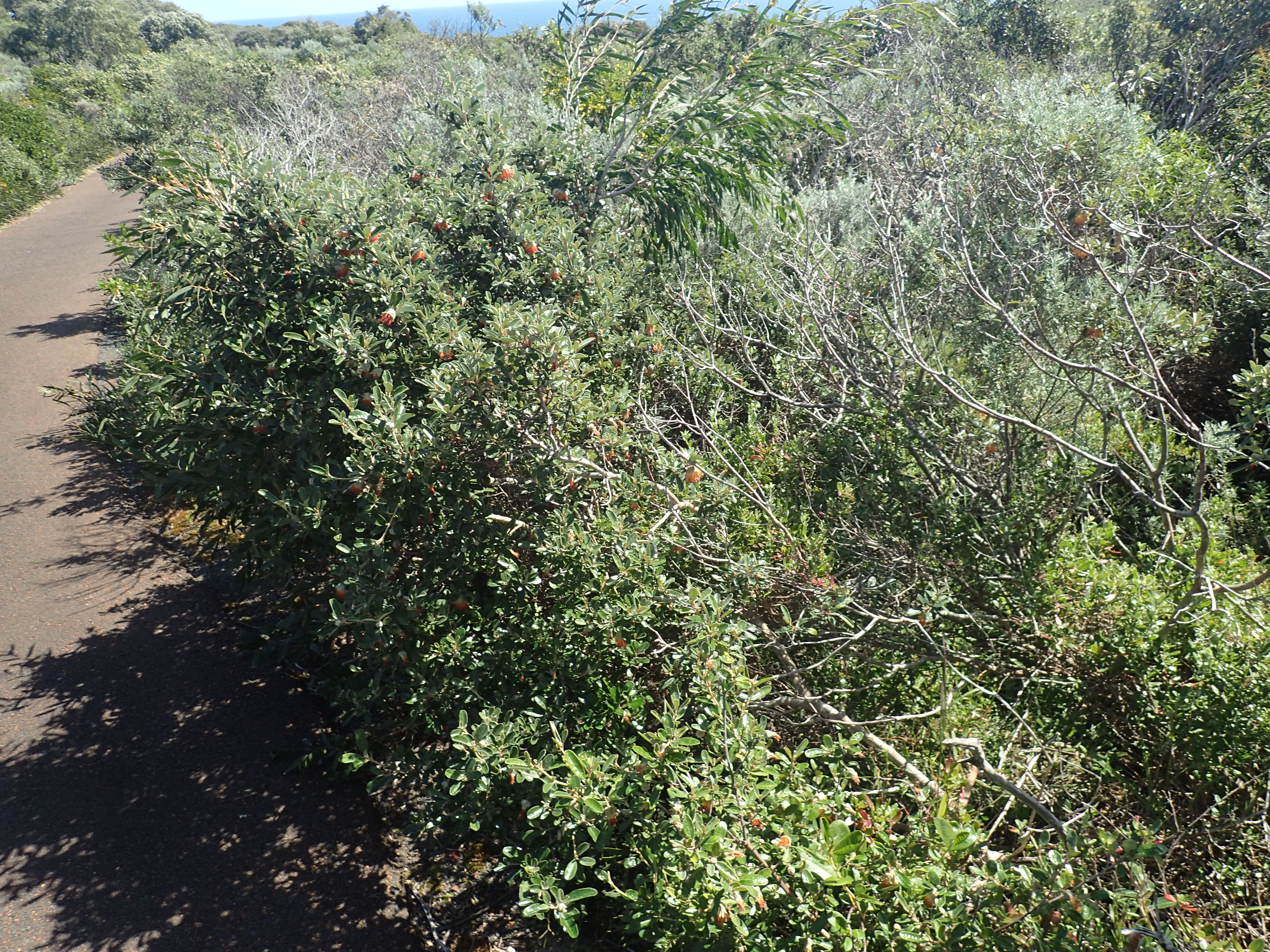
Habit

Diplolaena dampieri, commonly known as Dampier's rose, is a species of flowering plant in the family Rutaceae. It is endemic to the west coast of Western Australia. It has slightly leathery, oblong-elliptic shaped leaves, hairy bracts and pale red to orange flowers from July to September.

== Description ==
Diplolaena dampieri is a spreading, rounded shrub that typically grows to a height of 1.5 m (4 ft 11 in). It has strongly aromatic, elliptic to oblong-elliptic shaped, leathery leaves to 40 mm (1.6 in) long, the upper surface dark olive green and hairless when mature, the lower surface thickly covered in cream to grey weak hairs. The pendulous flowers are borne at the end of branches, about 10–15 mm (0.39–0.59 in) in diameter, outer bracts narrowly triangular to oval shaped, 7–10 mm (0.28–0.39 in) long with thick, grey to reddish star-shaped hairs. The inner bracts narrowly oblong, about 12 mm (0.47 in) long and densely covered with short, matted, star shaped hairs. The orange to pale red petals about 5 mm (0.20 in) long and thickly covered with small hairs on the edges. Flowering occurs from July to September.

== Taxonomy ==
Diplolaena dampieri was first formally described in 1817 by René Louiche Desfontaines and the description was published in Memoires du Museum d'Histoire Naturelle.

== Distribution and habitat ==
Dampier's rose grows in the south west from Cape Leeuwin, north to Fremantle in low heath, loamy soils, limestone and sand dunes.
