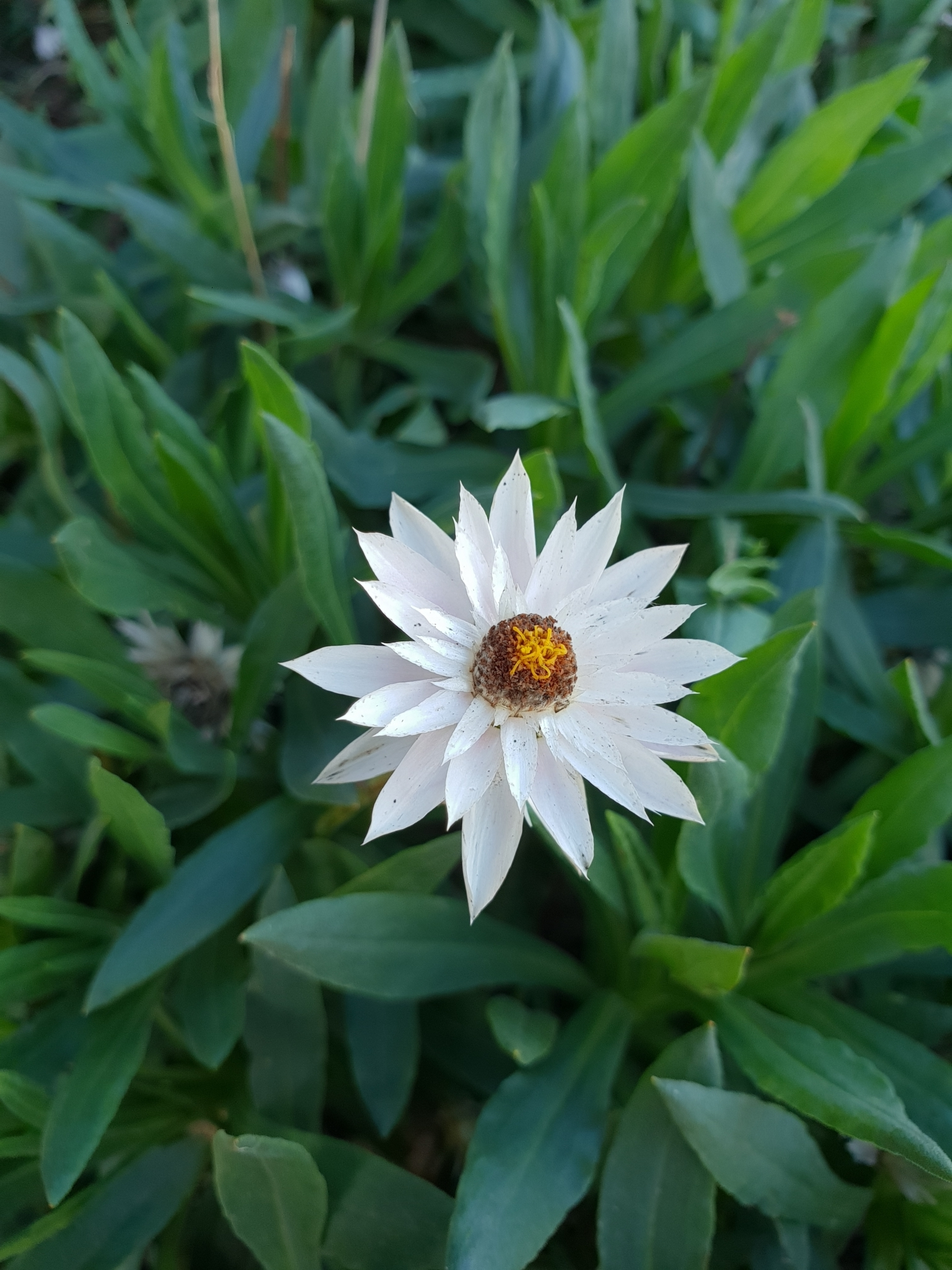

Scientific classification
- Kingdom: Plantae
- Clade: Tracheophytes
- Clade: Angiosperms
- Clade: Eudicots
- Clade: Asterids
- Order: Asterales
- Family: Asteraceae
- Genus: Xerochrysum
- Species: X. wilsonii

Binomial name
- Xerochrysum wilsonii T.L.Collins

= Xerochrysum wilsonii =

Species of plant

Xerochrysum wilsonii is a flowering plant in the family Asteraceae native to the South West of Western Australia.
