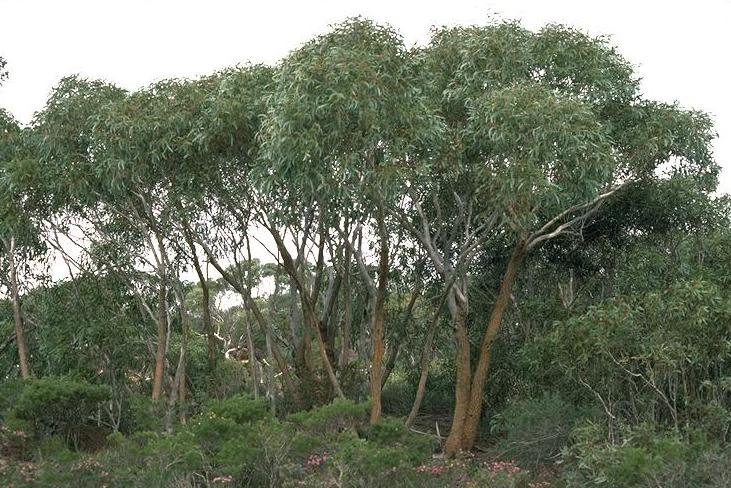
- Eucalyptus suberea near Badgingarra

Conservation status
- Vulnerable (IUCN 3.1)

- Vulnerable (EPBC Act)

Scientific classification
- Kingdom: Plantae
- Clade: Tracheophytes
- Clade: Angiosperms
- Clade: Eudicots
- Clade: Rosids
- Order: Myrtales
- Family: Myrtaceae
- Genus: Eucalyptus
- Species: E. suberea

Binomial name
- Eucalyptus suberea Brooker & Hopper

= Eucalyptus suberea =

Mount Lesueur mallee

Species of eucalyptus

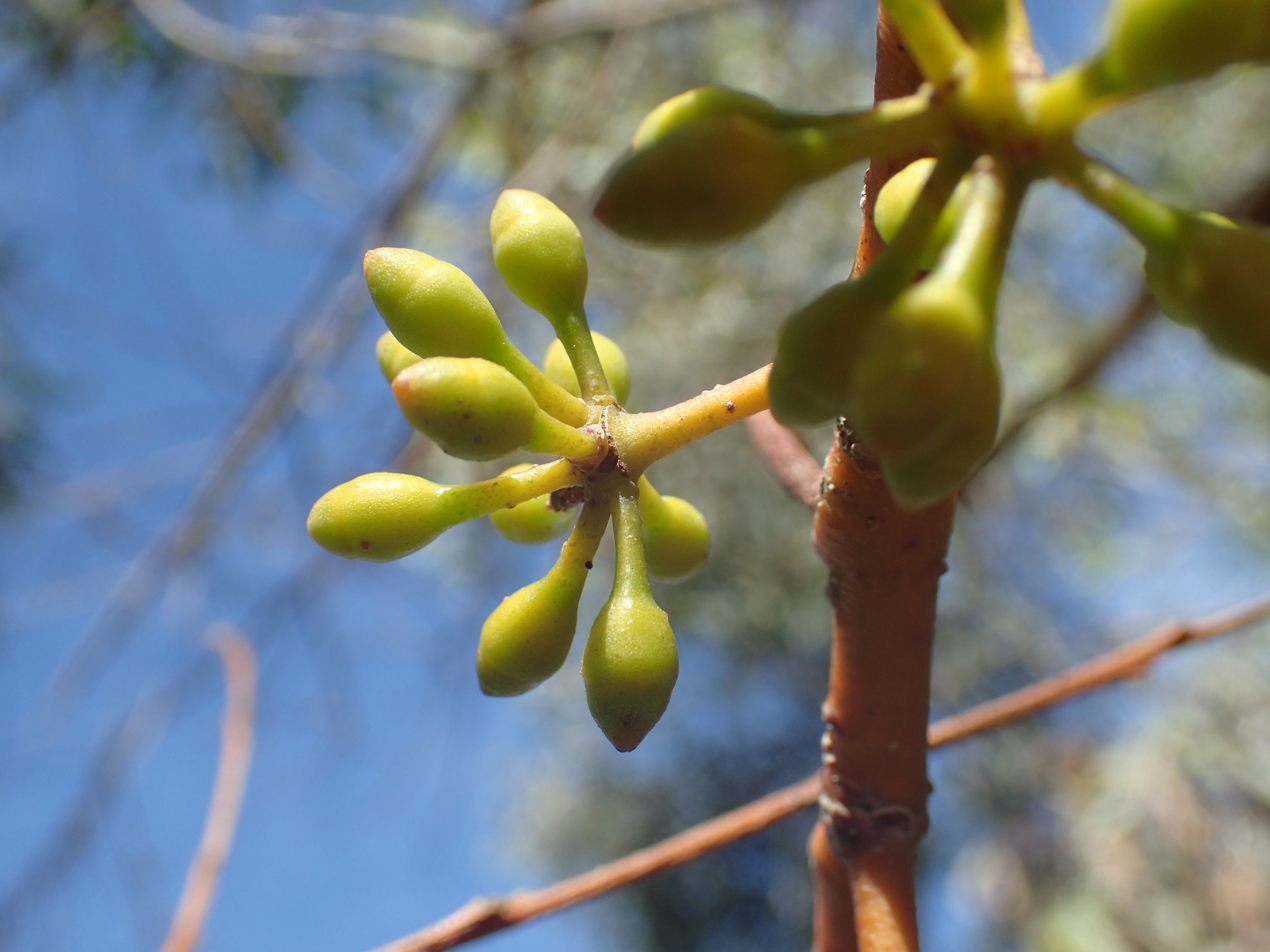
Flower buds

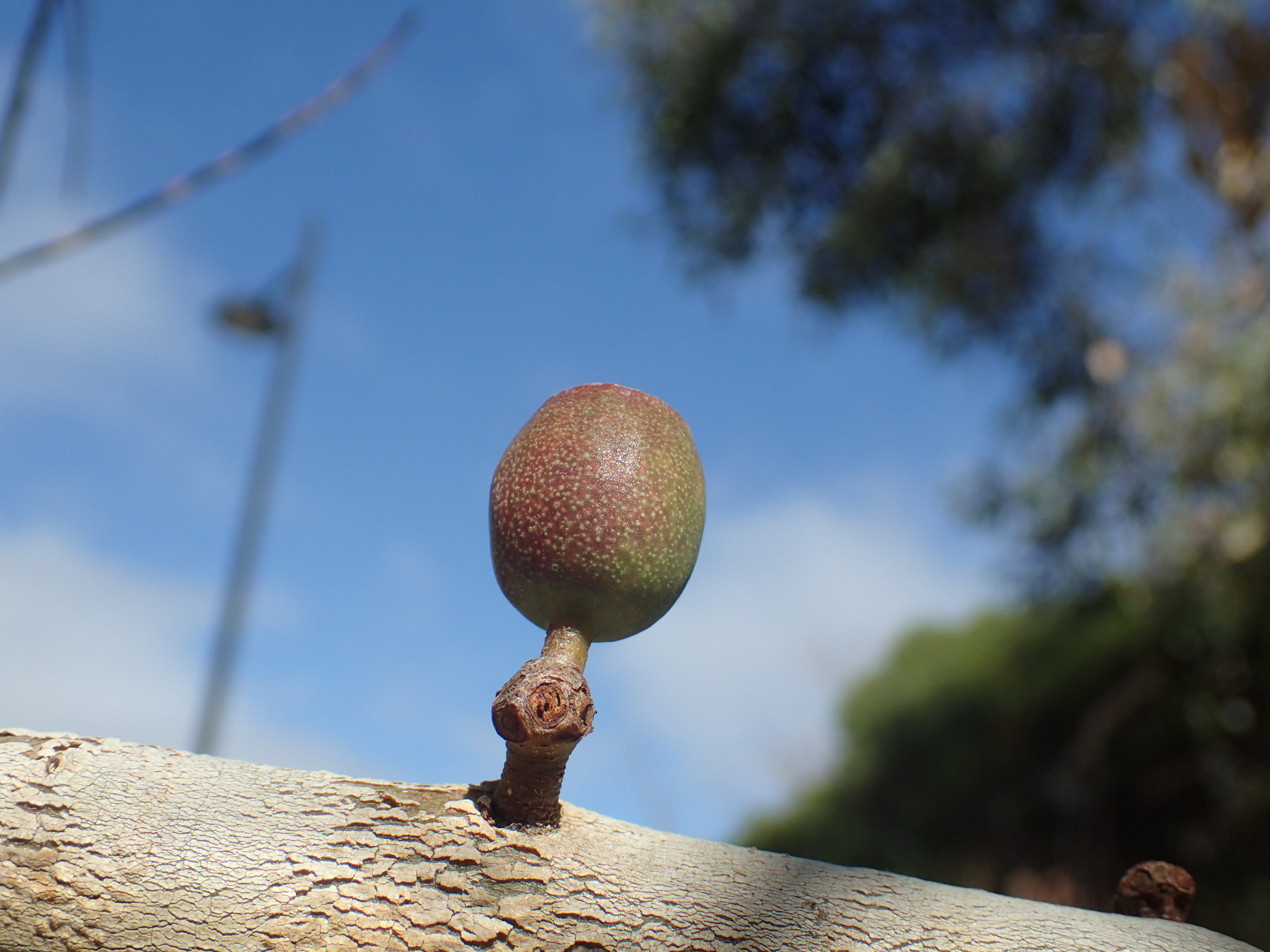
Fruit

Eucalyptus suberea, commonly known as Mount Lesueur mallee or cork mallee, is a species of mallee or a small tree that is endemic to a small area on the west coast of Western Australia. It has rough bark on some or all of the trunk, smooth white bark above, lance-shaped adult leaves, flower buds in groups of eleven to twenty or more, white flowers, and shortened spherical fruit.

== Description ==
Eucalyptus suberea is a mallee or small tree that typically grows to a height of 3–6 m (9.8–19.7 ft) and forms a lignotuber. It has rough, corky or flaky, grey to brownish bark on some or all of the trunk, smooth white, sometimes powdery bark above. Young plants and coppice regrowth have bluish to light green leaves that are lance-shaped, 40–80 mm (1.6–3.1 in) long and 10–20 mm (0.39–0.79 in) wide. Adult leaves are the same shade of slightly glossy green on both sides, lance-shaped, 55–100 mm (2.2–3.9 in) long and 8–17 mm (0.31–0.67 in) wide, tapering to a petiole 6–15 mm (0.24–0.59 in) long. The flower buds are arranged in leaf axils on an unbranched peduncle 6–15 mm (0.24–0.59 in) long, the individual buds on pedicels 2–4 mm (0.079–0.157 in) long. Mature buds are oval, 6–15 mm (0.24–0.59 in) long and about 4 mm (0.16 in) wide with a conical operculum. Flowering has been recorded in September, and the flowers are white. The fruit is a woody, shortened spherical capsule 6–8 mm (0.24–0.31 in) long and 7–10 mm (0.28–0.39 in) wide with the valves ner rim level.

== Taxonomy and naming ==
Eucalyptus suberea was first formally described in 1986 by Ian Brooker and Stephen Hopper in the journal Nuytsia from specimens Brooker collected, north of Badgingarra in 1983. The specific epithet (suberea) is from the Latin word subereus and refers to the rough, corky bark of older specimens.

== Distribution and habitat ==
Mount Lesueur mallee grows on scree slopes in open mallee over dense heath, from near Mount Lesueur towards Badgingarra.

== Conservation status ==
This eucalypt is classified as "vulnerable" under the Australian Government Environment Protection and Biodiversity Conservation Act 1999 and as "Threatened Flora (Declared Rare Flora — Extant)" by the Department of Environment and Conservation (Western Australia). The main threat to the species is inappropriate fire regimes. The IUCN Red List assesses the species as Vulnerable.

== See also ==
- List of Eucalyptus species
