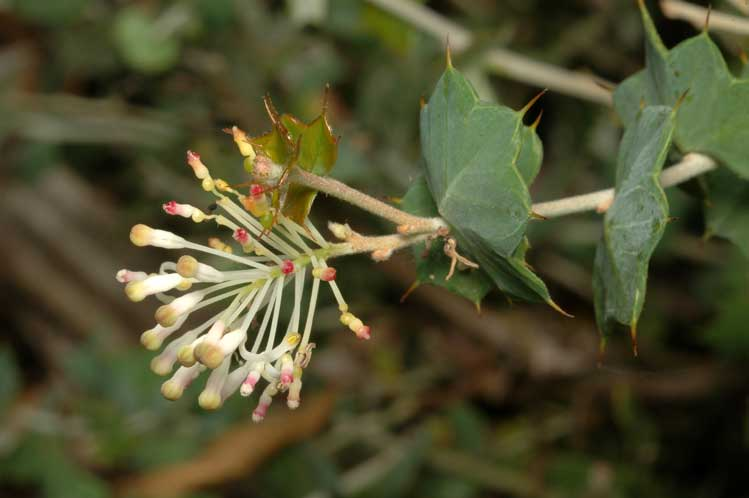

Conservation status
- Endangered (IUCN 3.1)

Scientific classification
- Kingdom: Plantae
- Clade: Embryophytes
- Clade: Tracheophytes
- Clade: Spermatophytes
- Clade: Angiosperms
- Clade: Eudicots
- Order: Proteales
- Family: Proteaceae
- Genus: Grevillea
- Species: G. amplexans

Binomial name
- Grevillea amplexans F.Muell. ex Benth.

Subspecies
- Grevillea amplexans subsp. adpressa; Grevillea amplexans subsp. amplexans; Grevillea amplexans subsp. semivestita

= Grevillea amplexans =

Species of shrub endemic to Western Australia

Grevillea amplexans is a species of flowering plant in the family Proteaceae and is endemic to the Mid West region of Western Australia. It is a spreading shrub with arching branches, stem-clasping, sharply-pointed, lobed or toothed leaves and white to cream-coloured flowers.

== Description ==
Grevillea amplexans is a spreading shrub that typically grows to a height of 1–3 m (3 ft 3 in – 9 ft 10 in) and has arching branches. Its leaves are 7–26 mm (0.28–1.02 in) long, 10–35 mm (0.39–1.38 in) wide and star-shaped or egg-shaped with three to seven lobes or five to eleven teeth on the edges, and a stem-clasping base. The flowers are arranged in more or less spherical to domed groups on the ends of branches. The flowers are white to cream-coloured and glabrous, the pistil 2.5–5.8 mm (0.098–0.228 in) long with a white style. Flowering occurs from July to December and the fruit is an oblong follicle 9–12 mm (0.35–0.47 in) long.

== Taxonomy ==
Grevillea amplexans was first formally described in 1870 by George Bentham from an unpublished description by Ferdinand von Mueller in Flora Australiensis. The specific epithet (amplexans) means "encircling" or "embracing", referring to the base of the leaves.

In 2000, Makinson and Wilson described three subspecies in the Flora of Australia, and the names are accepted by the Australian Plant Census:

- Grevillea amplexans subsp. adpressa (Olde & Marriott) Makinson tends to have smaller leaves than subsp. amplexans and often has down-curved leaf edges;
- Grevillea amplexans F.Muell. ex Benth. subsp. amplexans;
- Grevillea amplexans subsp. semivestita Makinson is distinguished from the autonym by its silky-hairy branchlets and glabrous, sometimes glaucous lower leaf surfaces.

(Grevillea amplexans subsp. adpressa was first formally described in 1993 by Olde and Marriott who gave it the name Grevillea adpressa in the journal Nuytsia.)

== Distribution and habitat ==
This grevillea grows in sand on sandplains between Geraldton, Coomberdale and Moora in the Avon Wheatbelt, Geraldton Sandplains and Swan Coastal Plain biogeographic regions of Western Australia. Subspecies adpressa grows in low heath between Mingenew and Watheroo, and subsp. amplexans grows in heathland or mallee-shrubland and subsp. semivestita occurs in shrubland and heath from Watheroo National Park to near Carnamah.

== Conservation status ==
Grevillea amplexans is listed as an endangered species by the International Union for Conservation of Nature, due to having an area of occupancy less than 200 km^{2} (77 sq mi), a severely fragmented range and a continuing decline of habitat due to ongoing clearance of roadside verges. Other potential threats to the species include altered fire regimes and competition with invasive weed species.

Subspecies amplexans is classified as not threatened by the Government of Western Australia Department of Biodiversity, Conservation and Attractions, but subsp. adpressa is listed as priority one meaning that it is known from only one or a few locations which are potentially at risk, and subsp. semivestita as priority two meaning that it is poorly known and from only one or a few locations.
