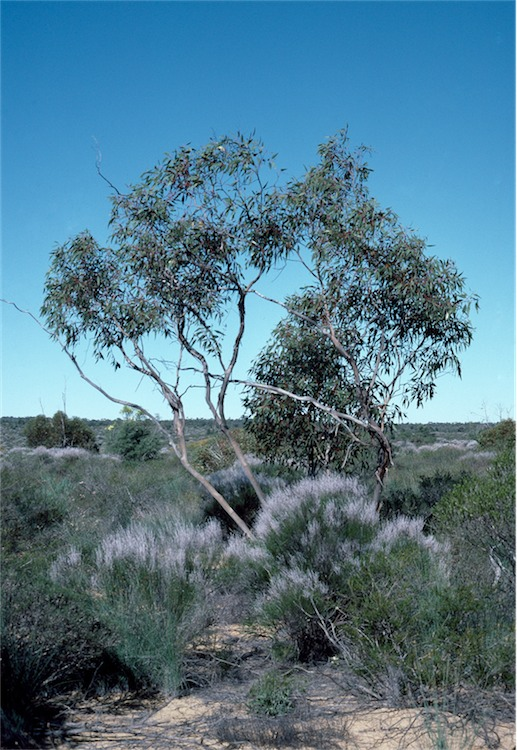
- Eucalyptus gittinsii near the Murchison River

Conservation status
- Vulnerable (IUCN 3.1)

Scientific classification
- Kingdom: Plantae
- Clade: Tracheophytes
- Clade: Angiosperms
- Clade: Eudicots
- Clade: Rosids
- Order: Myrtales
- Family: Myrtaceae
- Genus: Eucalyptus
- Species: E. gittinsii

Binomial name
- Eucalyptus gittinsii Brooker & Blaxell

= Eucalyptus gittinsii =

Northern sandplain mallee

Species of eucalyptus

Eucalyptus gittinsii, commonly known as northern sandplain mallee, is a species of mallee that is endemic to Western Australia. It has smooth greyish bark, sometimes with rough flaky bark near the base, lance-shaped to curved adult leaves, flower buds in groups of three, whitish flowers and cylindrical to barrel-shaped fruit.

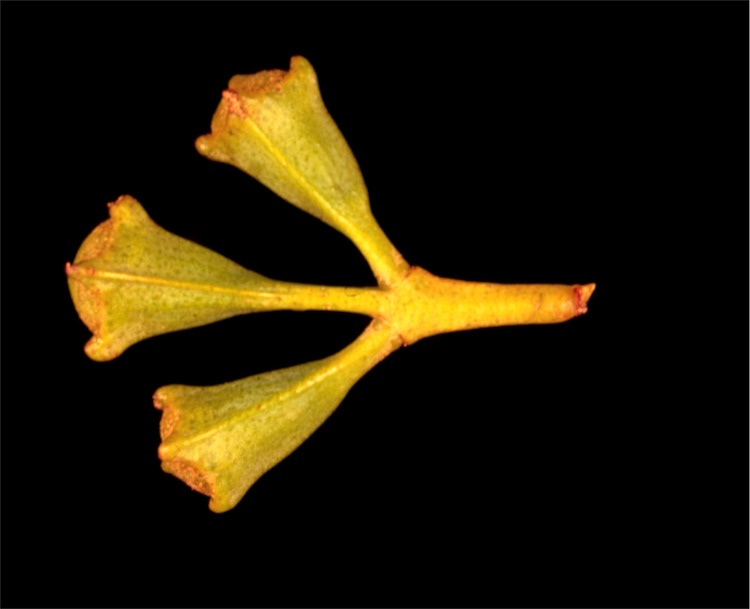
Buds

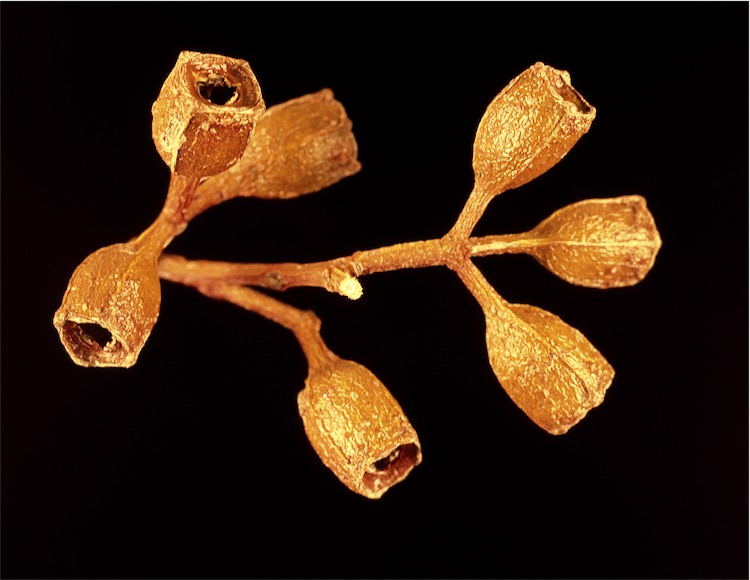
Fruit

== Description ==
Eucalyptus gittinsii is a mallee that typically grows to a height of 2–5 m (6 ft 7 in – 16 ft 5 in) and forms a lignotuber. It has smooth brownish to white bark, sometimes with rough, flaky bark that peels off near the base of the trunk. Young plants and coppice regrowth have leaves arranged in opposite pairs, broadly lance-shaped, 55–110 mm (2.2–4.3 in) long and 30–50 mm (1.2–2.0 in) wide. Adult leaves are arranged alternately, lance-shaped to curved, 75–130 mm (3.0–5.1 in) long and 12–30 mm (0.47–1.18 in) wide on a petiole long 10–30 mm (0.39–1.18 in) long. The flower buds are arranged in leaf axils in groups of three on a peduncle 5–18 mm (0.20–0.71 in) long, the individual buds on pedicels 2–8 mm (0.079–0.315 in) long. Mature buds are club-shaped, 6–8 mm (0.24–0.31 in) long and 4–5 mm (0.16–0.20 in) wide with a rounded to flattened operculum. Flowering occurs between December and February and the flowers are white or whitish. The fruit is a woody, cylindrical to barrel-shaped capsule that is more or less square in cross-section, 10–17 mm (0.39–0.67 in) long and 7–12 mm (0.28–0.47 in) wide.

== Taxonomy and naming ==
Eucalyptus gittinsii was first formally described in 1978 by Ian Brooker and Donald Blaxell in the journal Nuytsia from a specimen that Blaxell collected "67 km south of 'Billabong Roadhouse'" in 1975. The specific epithet honours Clifford Halliday Gittins (1904 - 1995) for his assistance to the National Herbarium of New South Wales.

In 2000, Dean Nicolle described two subspecies and the names have been accepted by the Australian Plant Census:

- Eucalyptus gittinsii Brooker & Blaxell gittinsii has glossy green adult leaves;
- Eucalyptus gittinsii subsp. illucida D.Nicolle has dull, light green to bluish-green adult leaves.

== Distribution and habitat ==
The northern sandplain mallee is found along the west coast of Western Australia on sand plains, sand dune and ridges in the Mid West and Wheatbelt regions of Western Australia where it grows in sandy soils often with lateritic gravel. Subspecies gittinsii grows in and near the Kalbarri National Park and subspecies illucida between Three Springs and the Moore River.

== Conservation status ==
Both subspecies of E. gittinsii are classified as "not threatened" by the Western Australian Government Department of Parks and Wildlife.

== See also ==
- List of Eucalyptus species
