= Paul Graham Wilson =

Australian botanist (1928–2024)

Paul G. Wilson
- Born: January 1928; Tzaneen
- Died: 29 July 2024 (aged 96)
- Education: University of Adelaide
- Spouse: Margaret A. Wilson
- Scientific career
- Fields: Botany
- Author abbrev. (botany): Paul G.Wilson

Paul Graham Wilson (January 1928 – 29 July 2024) was an Australian botanist. As of 1998, Wilson was the most prolific contributor to the journal Nuytsia, contributing to the first issue in 1970 and to the 12th volume in 1998, which was dedicated to him for his contributions to plant taxonomy and to celebrate his 70th birthday. Following his retirement from the Western Australian Herbarium in 1993, he helped to maintain a comprehensive census of the flora of Western Australia.

Wilson published over 80 scientific papers, provided names for 282 new plant taxa and changed the name or status of a further 400 plants. He mostly published papers dealing with the plant families Rutaceae, Asteraceae and Chenopodiaceae.

The following plant species or subspecies have been named after Wilson:

- Acacia wilsonii
- Boronia citriodora subsp. paulwilsonii
- Cryptandra wilsonii
- Calandrinia wilsonii
- Drummondita wilsonii
- Microcorys wilsoniana
- Nematolepis wilsonii (Phebalium wilsonii)
- Podotheca wilsonii
- Ptilotus wilsonii
- Sclerolaena wilsonii (Bassia wilsonii)
- Tecticornia indefessa
- Xerochrysum wilsonii

== Selected publications ==
- A taxonomic revision of the genera Crowea, Eriostemon, and Phebalium (Rutaceae)
- A taxonomic review of the genera Eriostemon and Philotheca (Rutaceae: Boronieae).;
- New species and nomenclatural changes in Phebalium and related genera (Rutaceae);
- Rhetinocarpha (Asteraceae: Gnaphalieae) - a new genus from Western Australia;
- Coronidium, a new Australian genus in the Gnaphalieae (Asteraceae).
