= Xerochrysum murapan =

Scientific classification
- Kingdom: Plantae
- Clade: Tracheophytes
- Clade: Angiosperms
- Clade: Eudicots
- Clade: Asterids
- Order: Asterales
- Family: Asteraceae
- Genus: Xerochrysum
- Species: X. murapan

Binomial name
- Xerochrysum murapan T.L.Collins & I.Telford

Species of plant

Xerochrysum murapan is a flowering plant in the family Asteraceae native to Australia.
