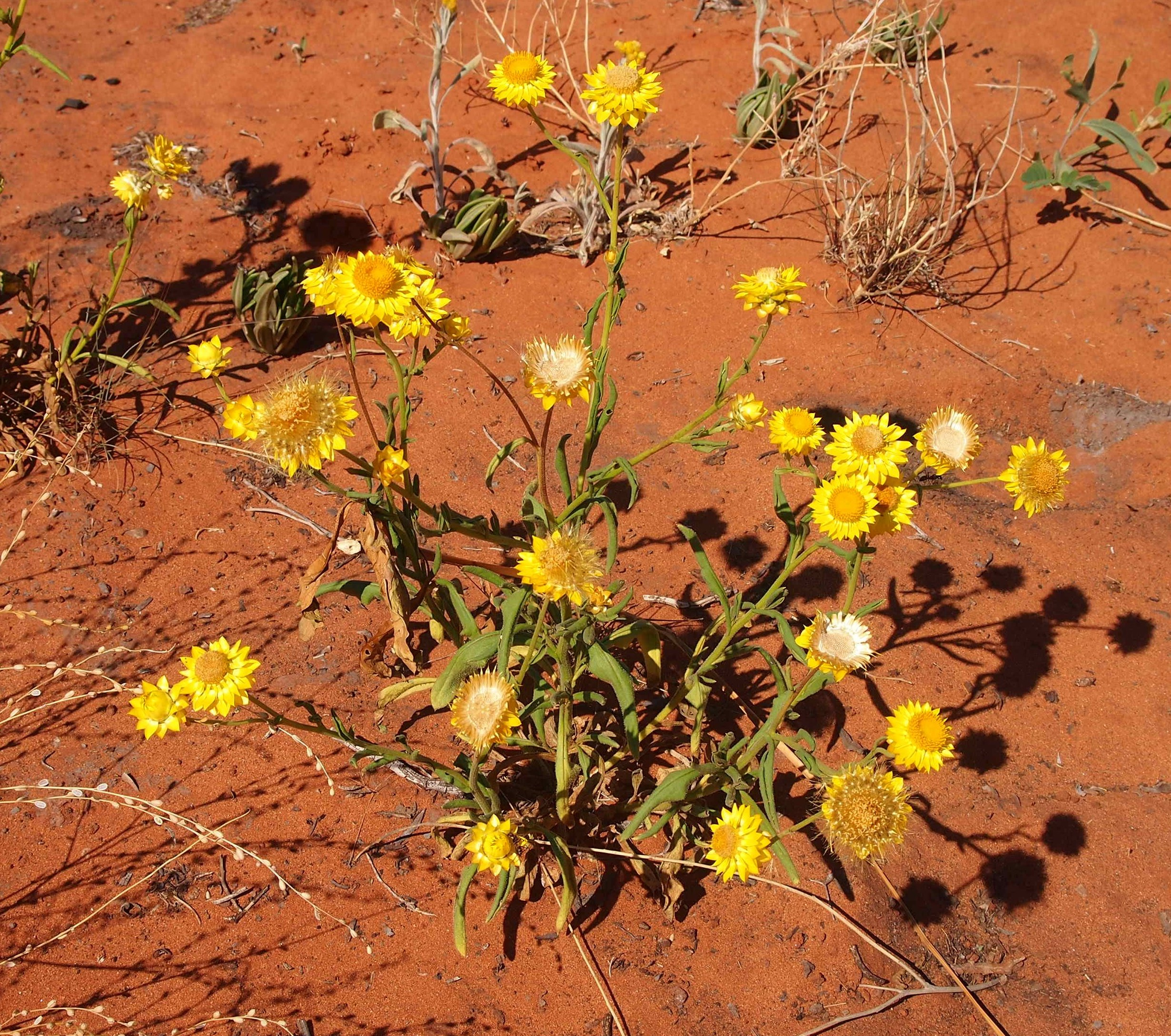
- Wild form of Xerochrysum bracteatum

Scientific classification
- Kingdom: Plantae
- Clade: Tracheophytes
- Clade: Angiosperms
- Clade: Eudicots
- Clade: Asterids
- Order: Asterales
- Family: Asteraceae
- Genus: Xerochrysum
- Species: X. bracteatum

Binomial name
- Xerochrysum bracteatum (Vent.) Tzvelev

Synonyms
- Bracteantha bracteata (Vent.) Anderb. & Haegi; Helichrysum bracteatum (Vent.) Andrews; Helichrysum lucidum Henckel; Helichrysum chrysanthum Pers.

= Xerochrysum bracteatum =

Species of flowering plant native to Australia

Xerochrysum bracteatum, commonly known as the golden everlasting or strawflower, is a flowering plant in the family Asteraceae native to Australia. Described by Étienne Pierre Ventenat in 1803, it was known as Helichrysum bracteatum for many years before being transferred to a new genus Xerochrysum in 1990. It is an annual up to 1 m (3.3 ft) tall with green or grey leafy foliage. Golden yellow or white flower heads are produced from spring to autumn; their distinctive feature is the papery bracts that resemble petals. The species is widespread, growing in a variety of habitats across the country, from rainforest margins to deserts and subalpine areas. The golden everlasting serves as food for various larvae of lepidopterans (butterflies and moths), and adult butterflies, hoverflies, native bees, small beetles, and grasshoppers visit the flower heads.

The golden everlasting has proven very adaptable to cultivation. It was propagated and developed in Germany in the 1850s, and annual cultivars in a host of colour forms from white to bronze to purple flowers became available. Many of these are still sold in mixed seed packs. In Australia, many cultivars are perennial shrubs, which have become popular garden plants. Sturdier, long-stemmed forms are used commercially in the cut flower industry.

== Taxonomy ==
French botanist Étienne Pierre Ventenat described the golden everlasting as Xeranthemum bracteatum in his 1803 work Jardin de Malmaison, a book commissioned by Napoleon's first wife Joséphine de Beauharnais to catalogue rare plants that she had collected and grown at the Château de Malmaison. The Latin species name bracteatum refers to the papery bracts (often mistakenly called petals) of the flower heads. Henry Cranke Andrews transferred it to the genus Helichrysum based on the morphology of its receptacle in 1805, and it was known as Helichrysum bracteatum for many years. Leo Henckel von Donnersmarck described it as Helichrysum lucidum in 1806, and Christiaan Hendrik Persoon as Helichrysum chrysanthum in 1807. It was given the name Bracteantha bracteata in 1991, when Arne Anderberg and Laurie Haegi placed the members that are known as strawflowers of the large genus Helichrysum into a new genus Bracteantha, and designated B. bracteata as the type species. However, they were unaware that Russian botanist Nikolai Tzvelev had already placed X. bracteatum in the new, and at the time monotypic, genus Xerochrysum the previous year. This name was derived from the Greek words xeros "dry", and chrysum "golden", likely relating to the nature of the distinctive bracts. Confusion existed for a decade, with Bracteantha appearing in literature and the horticultural trade until it was clarified in 2002 that the latter name took precedence. Strawflower is the popular name for X. bracteatum in Europe, while in Australia it is known as an everlasting or paper daisy. An alternate name in 19th-century Europe was immortelle. X. bracteatum itself is very variable and may represent several cryptic species. Alternately, the Tasmanian species Xerochrysum bicolor may be combined with it in future taxonomic revisions.

Xerochrysum bracteatum and its relatives belong to the Gnaphalieae or paper daisies, a large tribe within the daisy family, Asteraceae. However, a 2002 molecular study of the Gnaphalieae has indicated the genus Xerochrysum is probably polyphyletic, as the two species sampled, X. bracteatum and X. viscosum, were not closely related to each other. X. bracteatum has been recorded hybridising with X. viscosum and X. papillosum in cultivation, and possibly also Coronidium elatum and C. boormanii.

== Description ==
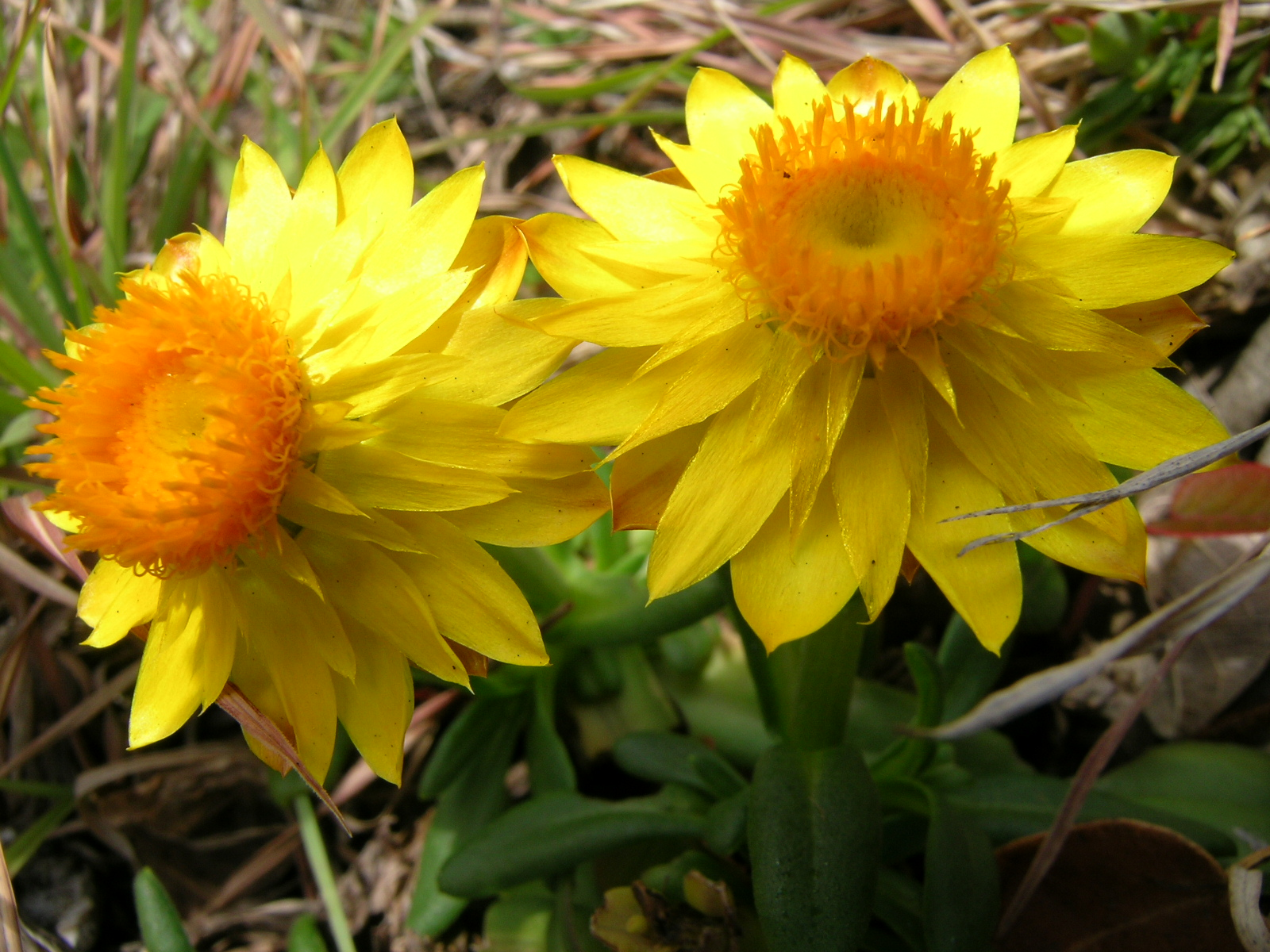
Wild form showing yellow bracts and orange central disc

The plant is an erect perennial, or occasionally annual, herb that is simple or rarely branched at its base. It generally reaches 20 to 80 cm (8 to 31.5 in) in height, but can have a prostrate habit in exposed areas such as coastal cliffs. The green stems are rough and covered with fine hairs, and are robust compared with those of other members of the genus. The leaves are lanceolate, elliptic, or oblanceolate in shape and measure 1.5 to 10 cm (0.59 to 3.94 in) long and from 0.5 to 2 cm (0.20 to 0.79 in) wide. They are also covered with cobwebby hairs. Sitting atop tall stems above the foliage, the flower heads range from 3 to 7 cm (1 to 3 in) in diameter. Occasionally, multiple heads arise from the one stem. Like the flowers of all Asteraceae, they are composed of a central disc which contains a number of tiny individual flowers, known as florets; these sit directly on an enlarged part of the stem known as the receptacle.

Around the disc is an involucre of modified leaves, the bracts, which in Xerochrysum, as in most Gnaphalieae, are petal-like, stiff, and papery. Arranged in rows, these bracts curl over and enclose the florets, shielding them before flowering. They create the impression of a shiny and yellow corolla around the disc. The intermediate bracts are sometimes white, while the outer ones are paler and often streaked reddish or brown (a greater variety of colours are found in cultivars). These bracts are papery and dry, or 'scarious', with a low water content, unlike leaves or flower parts of other plants. They are made up of dead cells, which are unusual in that they have a thin primary and a thick secondary cell wall, a feature only found in sclerenchyma, or structural, cells, not cells of flowers or leaves.

The individual florets are yellow. Those on the outer regions of the disc are female, while those in the centre are bisexual. Female flowers lack stamens and have only a very short, tube-shaped corolla surrounding a pistil that splits to form two stigmas, while bisexual or hermaphrodite flowers have a longer corolla, and (as in virtually all members of the family) five stamens fused at the anthers, with the pistil emerging from the center. The yellow corolla and pistil are located above an ovary with a single ovule, and surrounded by the pappus, the highly modified calyx of Asteraceae. It comprises a number of bristles radiating around the florets. Yellow in colour, they persist and are thought to aid in the wind dispersal of the 0.3 cm (0.12 in) long fruit. The smooth brown fruit, known as a cypsela, is 2 to 3 mm long with the pappus radiating from one end.

In the wild, X. bracteatum can be distinguished from X. bicolor in Tasmania by its broader leaves and cobwebby hairs on the stems, and from X. macranthum in Western Australia by the flower head colour; the latter species has white flower heads whereas those of X. bracteatum are golden yellow. Xerochrysum subundulatum from alpine and subalpine areas of New South Wales, Victoria, and Tasmania is rhizomatous, and has markedly pointed orange bracts. The eastern Australian species X. viscosum may be distinguished by its rough and sticky leaves.

The plant is a source of helenynolic acid, a rare fatty acid.

== Distribution and habitat ==
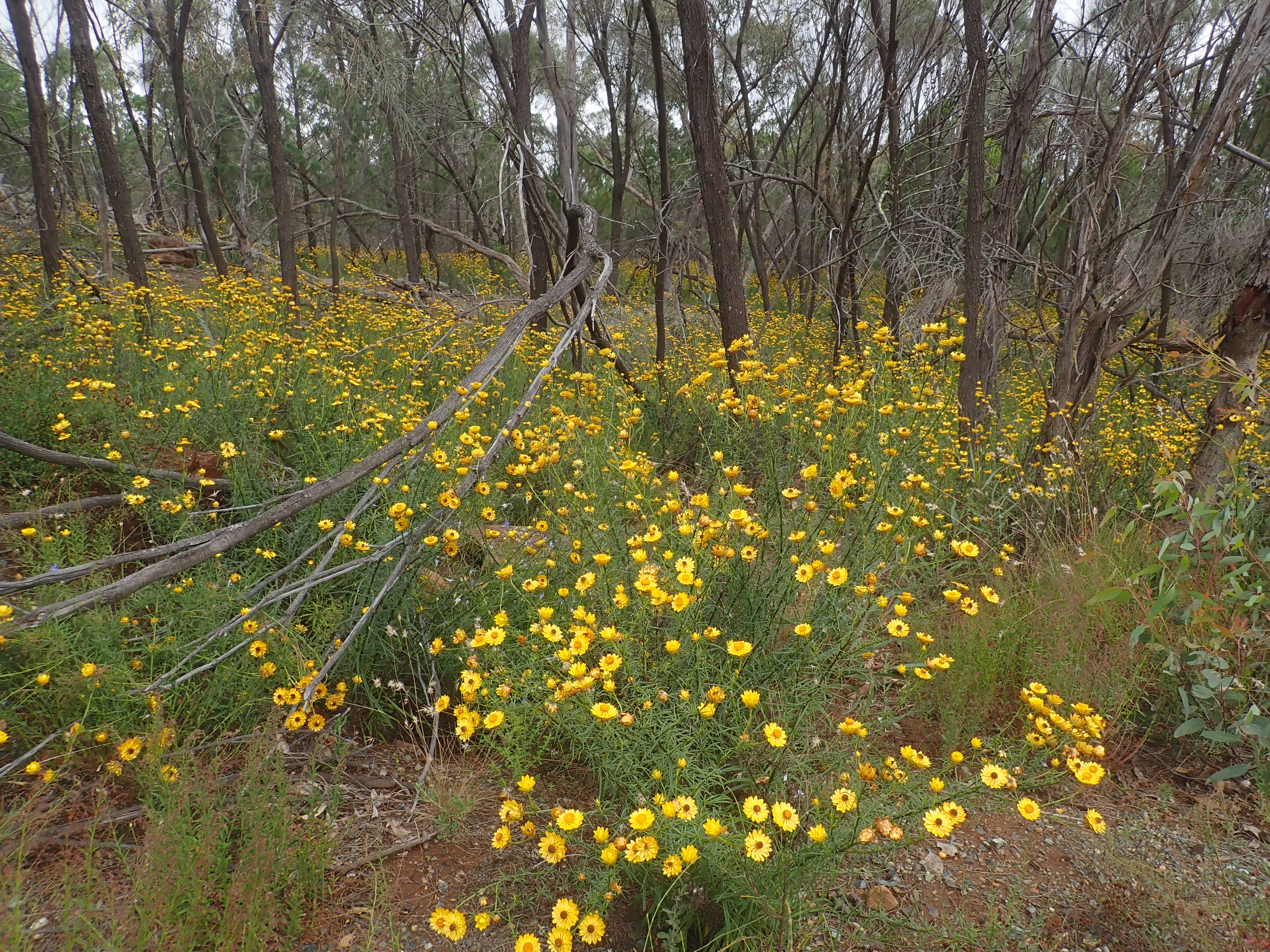
Xerochrysum bracteatum near Weethalle

Xerochrysum bracteatum occurs in all Australian mainland states and territories, as well as Tasmania. Widespread, it is found from North Queensland across to Western Australia, and in all habitats excluding densely shaded areas. It grows as an annual in patches of red sand in Central Australia, responding rapidly to bouts of rainfall to complete its lifecycle. It is common among granite outcrops in southwest Western Australia, and is found on heavier and more fertile soils in the Sydney region, such as basalt-, shale-, or limestone-based soils, generally in areas with a high water table. Associated species in the Sydney Basin include blackbutt (Eucalyptus pilularis) in open forest, and the shrubs Empodisma minus and Baloskion australe in swampy areas. It has been reported growing in disturbed soil, along roadsides and in fields in the New England region in the United States.

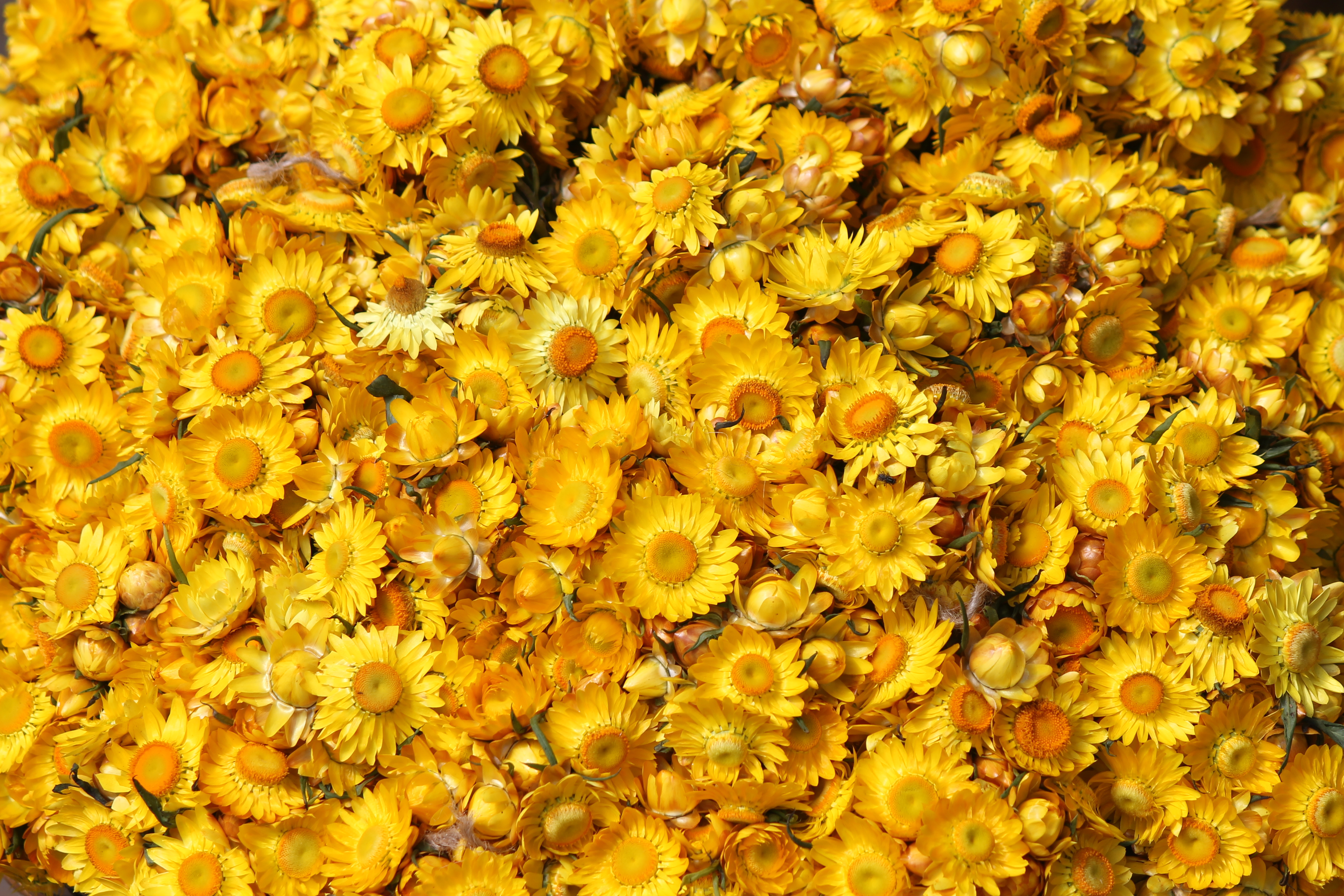
Xerochrysum bracteatum Everlasting flower from Ooty, India

== Ecology ==
The brightly coloured bracts act as petals to attract insects such as hoverflies, native bees, and small beetles that pollinate the florets. Grasshoppers also visit the flower heads. The caterpillars of Tebenna micalis have been recorded on this species, as have those of the Australian painted lady (Vanessa kershawi). The tiny fruits are dispersed by wind, and germinate and grow after fire or on disturbed ground.

Flower production is related to increasing day length, and in general, plants produced the most flowers from December to March. Varying planting times or artificially changing light levels might be ways to increase production of flowers outside these months.

The water mould (oomycete) Bremia lactucae has infected commercial crops in Italy and California. In 2002 on the Ligurian coast, widespread infection of several cultivars, most severely 'Florabella Pink' and to a lesser extent 'Florabella Gold' and 'Florabella White', resulted in leaf blistering and the development of chlorotic lesions on the leaves, and white patches on the undersides, particularly in areas of poor ventilation. There was an outbreak of downy mildew in a cultivated crop of Xerochrysum bracteatum in San Mateo County, California in 2006, in which the leaves developed large chlorotic lesions. A Phytoplasma infection damaged X. bracteatum crops in the Czech Republic between 1994 and 2001, causing poor growth, bronzing of foliage, and malformation of flower heads. Genetically, the pathogen was indistinguishable from the agent of aster yellows. The root-knot nematode (Meloidogyne incognita) attacks and forms galls on the roots, which leads to the morbidity or death of the plant.

== Cultivation ==
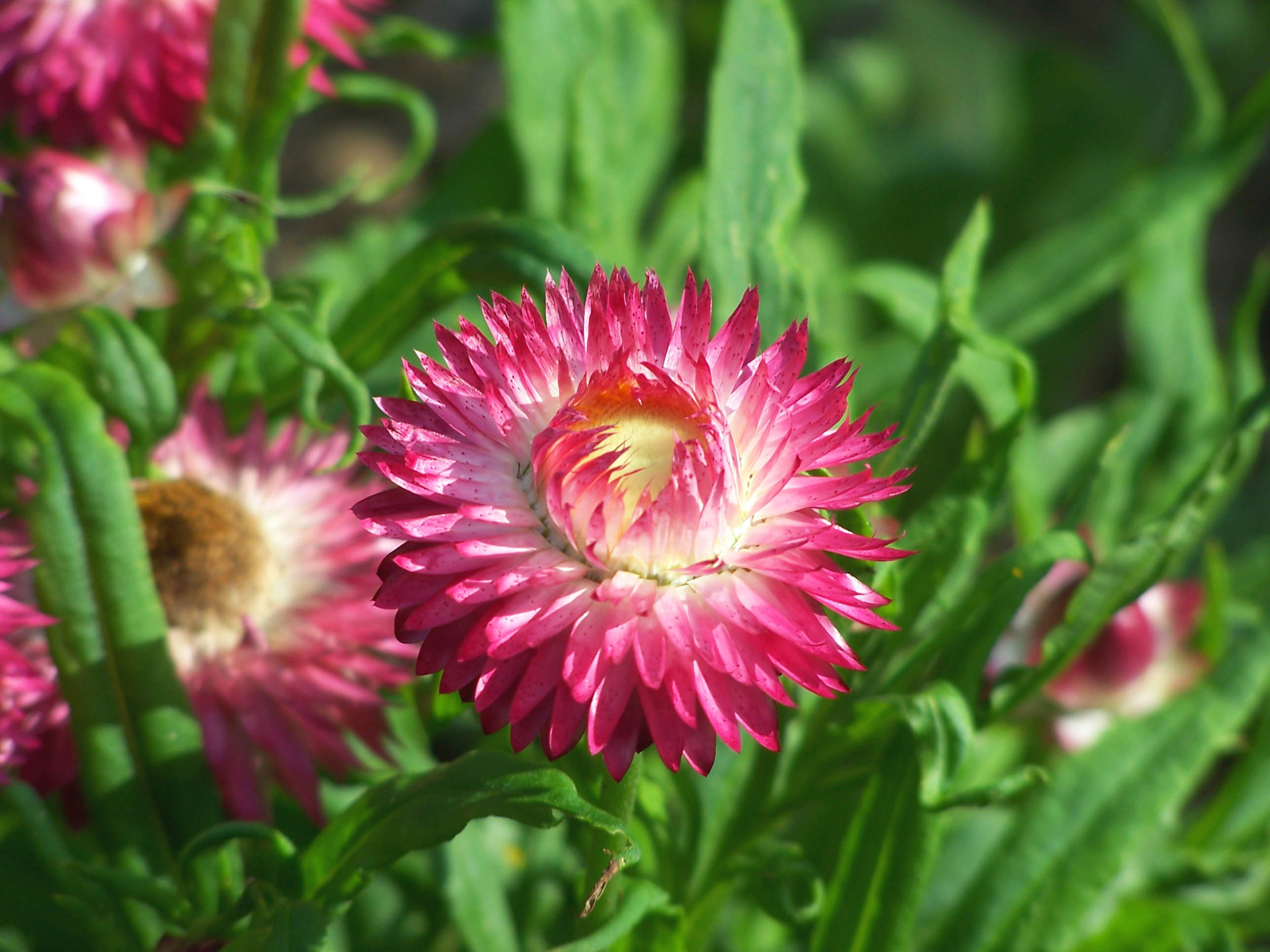
A European colour form

Xerochrysum bracteatum had been introduced to cultivation in England by 1791. German horticulturist Herren Ebritsch obtained material and developed it at his nursery in Arnstadt near Erfurt in Germany. He bred and sold cultivars of many colours from bronze to white to purple, which spread across Europe in the 1850s. The bracts of these early forms tended to remain cupped around the flower head rather than flatten out like the native Australian forms. These were also annual rather than perennial forms. Many were given cultivar names such as 'atrococcineum' (dark scarlet flower heads), 'atrosanguineum' (dark blood-red flower heads), 'aureum' (golden yellow flower heads), 'bicolor' (red-tipped yellow flower heads), 'compositum' (large multicoloured flower heads), 'macranthum' (large rose-edged white flower heads), and 'monstrosum' (flower heads with many bracts), although today they are generally sold in mixed seed for growing as annuals. Some coloured forms of South African Helichrysum are thought to have been introduced to the breeding program, which resulted in the huge array of colours. X. bracteatum was one of several species that became popular with European royalty and nobility from the early 19th century, yet were little noticed in Australia until the 1860s, when they became more prominent in Australian gardens.

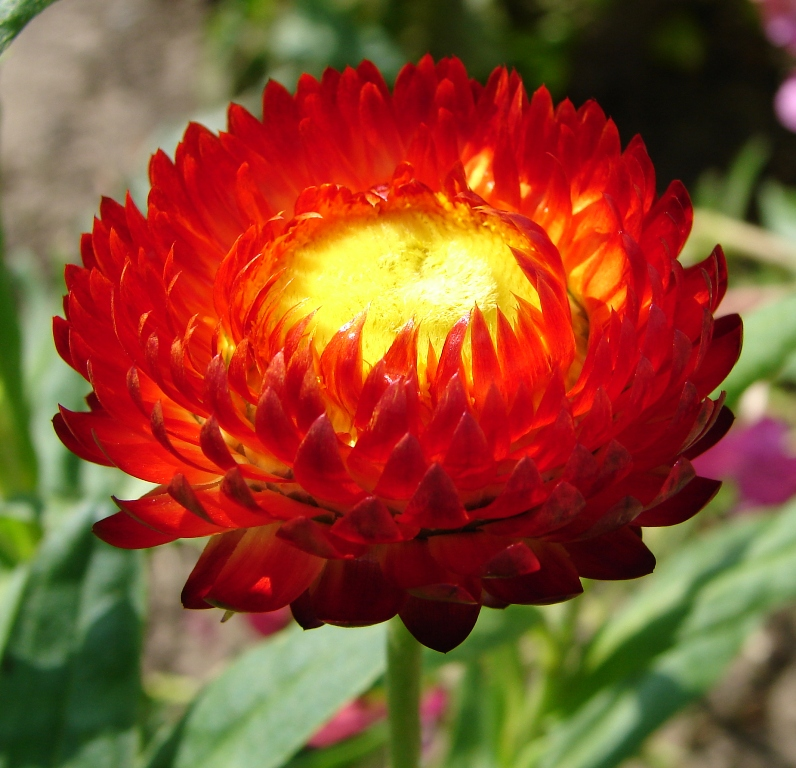
An orange-red-flowered cultivar

Most of the cultivars brought into cultivation in Australia in the latter part of the 20th century are perennials. 'Dargan Hill Monarch' was the first of these, and many more have followed. Profusely flowering, these grow in many colours including white, yellow, orange, bronze, pink, and red. Their commercial lifespans are generally around three years. Queensland-based company Aussie Winners has a range of compact plants ranging from orange to white known as Sundaze. Plants of this series usually have larger leaves. This range won the Gran premio d'oro at the Euroflora exposition in Geneva in 2001, for the best new plant series in the previous three years. 'Florabella Gold', a member of the Florabella series, won the award for best new pot plant (vegetative) in the Society of American Florists' competition of 1999. The Wallaby cultivars are range of taller forms with narrow leaves and white, yellow or pink flowers. Other commercial ranges include the Nullarbor series, and Queensland Federation daisies, including 'Wanetta Sunshine' and 'Golden Nuggets'.

Xerochrysum bracteatum is easy to grow both from seeds and from cuttings, although named cultivars only grow true from cuttings. Plants benefit from pruning of old growth in winter to allow for new growth in spring. Dead-heading, or pruning off old flower heads, promotes the production of more flowers. Fresh seeds germinate in 3 to 20 days and require no special treatment. Plants grow best in acid, well-aerated soils of pH 5.5 to 6.3, with low levels of phosphorus. They are sensitive to iron deficiency, which presents as yellowing (chlorosis) of the youngest leaves while the leaf veins remain green.

Xerochrysum bracteatum can be grown in large pots or window boxes, and is a good pioneer plant in the garden until other plants become more established. Lower-growing cultivars are suitable for hanging baskets and border plantings. The flowers attract butterflies to the garden. Dried flowers are long lasting—up to some years—and are used in floral arrangements and the cut flower industry. More robust longer stemmed forms are used for commercial cut flowers. The main factor limiting lifespan of dried flowers is the wilting of stems, so flowers are sometimes wired into arrangements. Immersing flowers in glycerol or polyethylene glycol also lengthens lifespan.

=== Cultivars ===
- 'Bright Bikini' has gained the Royal Horticultural Society's Award of Garden Merit.

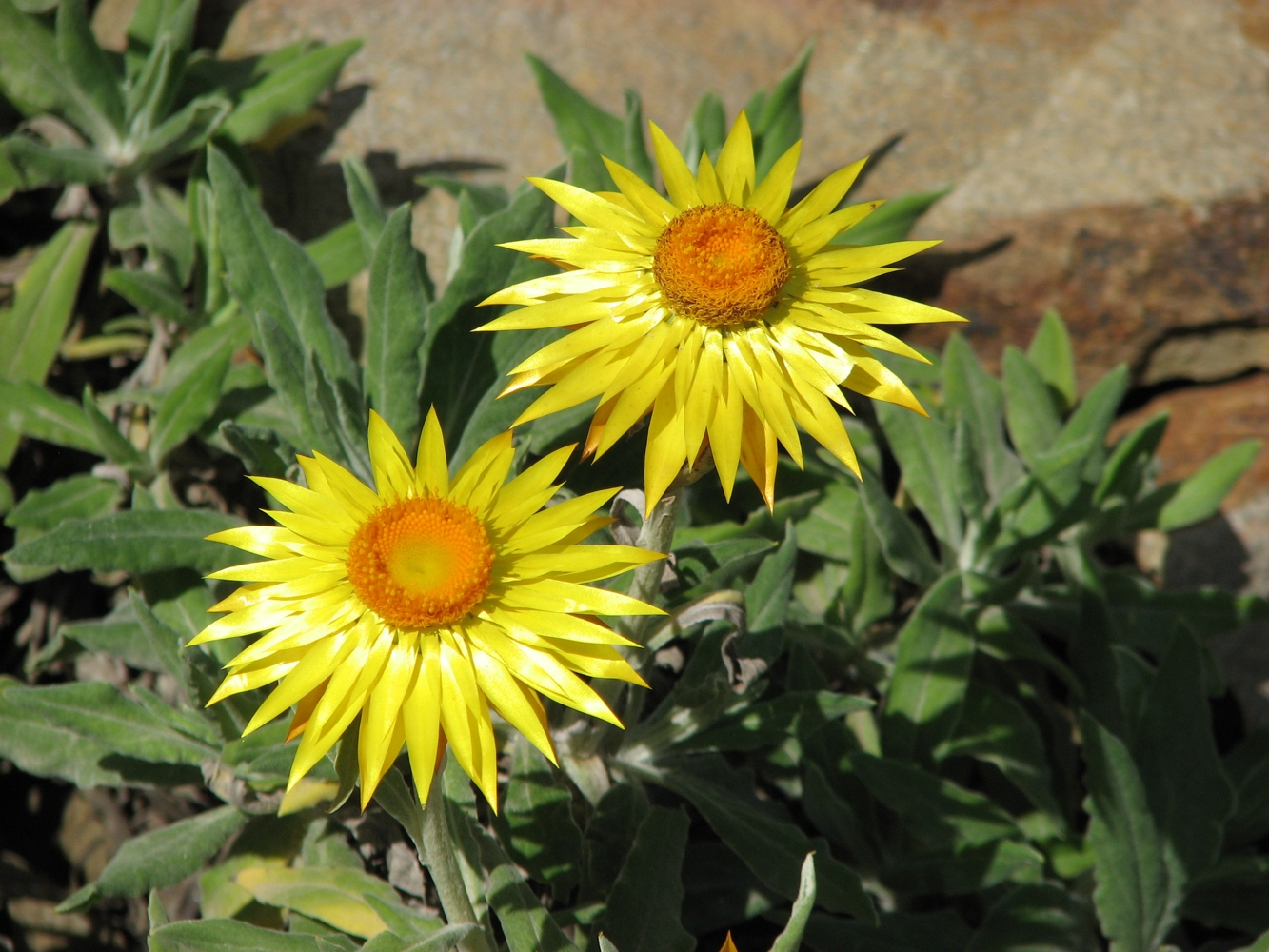
'Dargan Hill Monarch'

- 'Dargan Hill Monarch' was a natural form collected around 1.6 km (0.99 mi) inland from Cunninghams Gap in southern Queensland in May 1961, and registered in February 1977. It is a low perennial shrub 60 to 80 cm (23.5 to 31.5 in) high and 1.5 m (4.9 ft) across. The foliage is grey and the large flowers are 7–9 cm in diameter and golden yellow in colour. It grows best in full sun and fair drainage. Cuttings strike readily, as does seed, although seedlings may differ from the parent.
- 'Cockatoo' arose as a spontaneous hybrid between 'Dargan Hill Monarch' and a white-flowered perennial form of X. bracteatum, in the garden of Victorian plantsman Doug McKenzie in Ocean Grove near Geelong in Victoria. He applied to the Australian Cultivar Registration Authority (ACRA) for registration, which was granted in 1980. It is a dense perennial shrub which reaches around 1 m (3.3 ft) high and wide. The oblanceolate leaves measure 6 to 12 cm (2.5 to 4.5 in) long and are covered with fine hairs that give them a greyish cast. Fine hairs also cover the stems. The flower heads have light lemon-yellow bracts and orange discs and average 7 cm (3 in) in diameter. They are held on long stems around 12–15 cm (4.5–6 in) above the foliage. Like all forms, it prefers full sun. Although a perennial, it loses vigour after a few years, at which time it is best replaced. The name 'Cockatoo' was chosen as the shape and colour of the ray florets are reminiscent of the wing feathers of the sulphur-crested cockatoo.
- 'Golden Bowerbird' is a hybrid, bred by a deliberate backcross of 'Cockatoo' to 'Dargan Hill Monarch' by Doug McKenzie, who applied for registration with the ACRA in 1980. (It was granted in 1981.) It has much larger flower heads than both parents, yet is a smaller shrub, which reaches 40 cm (15.5 in) high by 70 cm (27.5 in) wide. Denser than that of other forms, the foliage is covered in fine grey hair. On stalks around 10 cm (4 in) above the foliage, the flower heads measure up to 9 cm (3.5 in) in diameter, although larger ones up to 10 cm are occasionally seen. They have around 300 bracts per flower head, compared with 80 for 'Dargan Hill Monarch' and 200 in 'Cockatoo', giving them a "doubled" look. It is reported as producing fewer flower heads than 'Princess of Wales'.
- 'Princess of Wales' is a spontaneous hybrid, arising from a cross between 'Dargan Hill Monarch' and an annual form. Arising in the Australian National Botanic Gardens in Canberra, it was selected by employee Peter Ollerenshaw in summer 1983. He applied to register the cultivar with ACRA in March 1985. It was named in honour of a visit by Diana, Princess of Wales to the gardens in November 1985, the same month registration was granted. With compact foliage, this form reaches 60 cm (23.5 in) high and wide. Unlike its parent 'Dargan Hill Monarch', its foliage has hair only on the midrib on the leaf underside. It flowers very profusely, and the large flower heads are borne on stalks 5–9 cm (2–3.5 in) above the foliage. Unlike other forms, the stems wither and die naturally after flowering, making way for more new growth and flowers. The flower heads are golden yellow and measure 6 cm (2.5 in) across.
- 'Diamond Head' was a natural form collected around Diamond Head in New South Wales, where it is quite common on bluffs and cliffs. John Wrigley, curator of the Australian National Botanic Gardens at the time, applied to the ACRA to have it registered, which it was in February 1977. Found on an exposed headland in nature, it grows as a low mat-like perennial shrub 8 cm (3 in) high and 60 cm (2.0 ft) across. The foliage is green and rough and the flowers are 3 cm in diameter and yellow in colour with an orange disc. It makes an ideal plant for rockeries, and strikes easily from cuttings during the spring growing period.

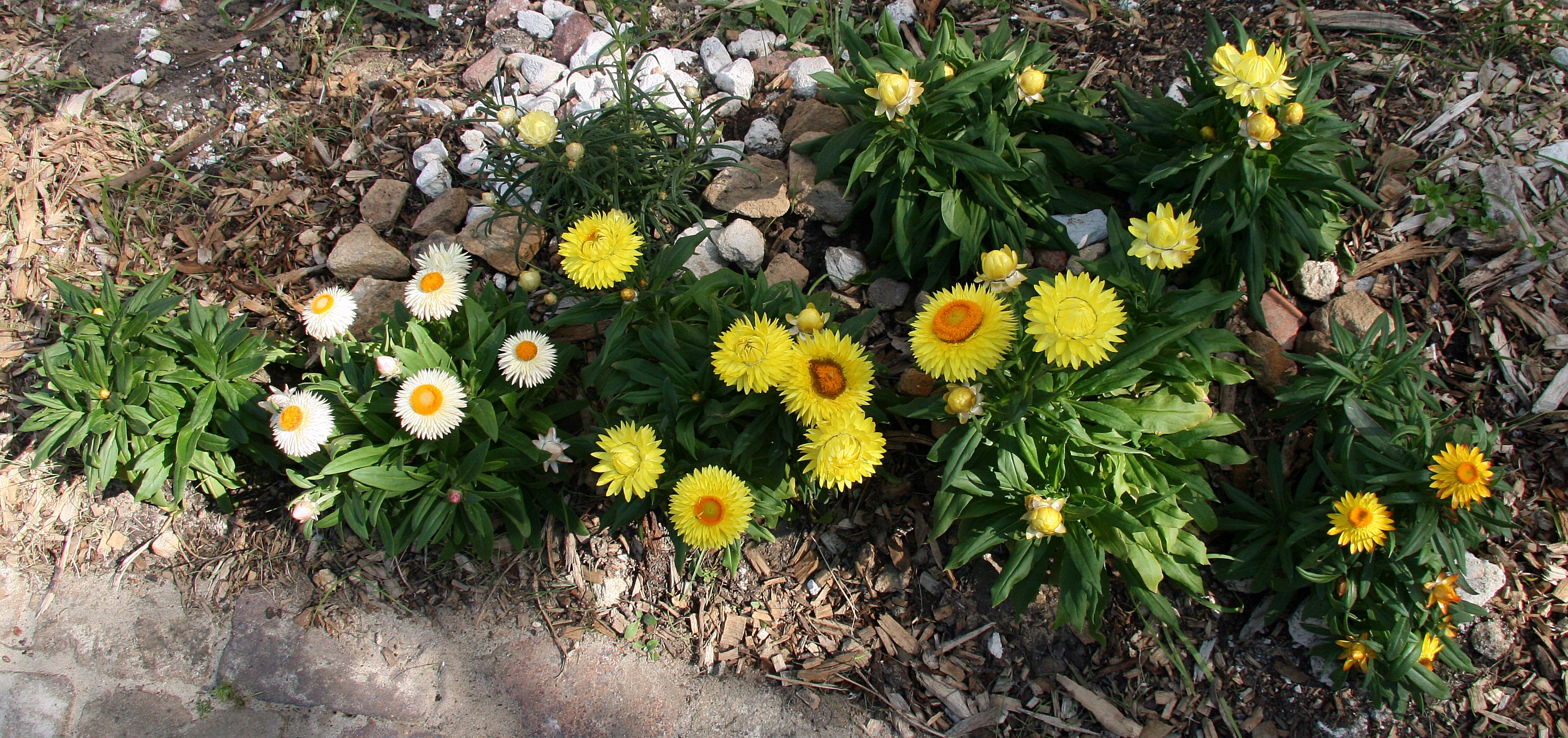
Colour forms in cultivation 'Strawburst Yellow', centre, 'Kimberley Sunset' (cream) bottom left, small bronze-flowered form 'Sundaze Dazette Mambo' (far right)

- 'Hastings Gold' was a natural form from Hastings Point to the east of Murwillumbah on the New South Wales far north coast. It is a perennial herb with green bushy foliage reaching 25 cm (10 in) high and 70 cm (27.5 in) wide. The golden yellow flower heads measure 5 cm (2 in) across and are held on stalks 20 cm (8 in) above the foliage. It is smaller than the similarly coloured 'Dargan Hill Monarch' and larger than 'Diamond Head'.
- 'Nullarbor Flame' was a selection introduced into cultivation in 1997 that produces abundant red flowers with yellow discs and a diameter of 4.5 cm (1.8 in). The plant grows to 50–70 cm (19.5–27.5 in) tall and 50–80 cm (19.5–31.5 in) wide.
- 'Pink Sunrise' was developed by Goldup Nurseries in Victoria in 1986, of unknown origin, presumably a hybrid. It is a compact perennial that reaches 30 cm (12 in) high and 60 cm (23.5 in) wide. The flower heads are pink in bud, before opening as cream with orange discs.
- 'White Monarch' was a spontaneous garden hybrid that resembles 'Dargan Hill Monarch' but with white flower heads with orange discs measuring up to 8 cm (3 in) in diameter.
- 'Lemon Monarch' resembles 'Cockatoo', but its lemon-coloured flower heads have fewer bracts. It has bushy foliage.
- 'Strawburst Yellow', patented as 'Stabur Yel', is a form with large bright yellow flower heads averaging around 6.3 cm (2.5 in) in diameter. The result of a planned breeding program in Gilroy, California, it was bred by Jason Jandrew of Goldsmith Seeds from a lemon yellow-flowered form crossed with a yellow-flowered form in 2005. The pollination occurred in May, the resultant seed was sown in September, and what was to become the clone was chosen in December for its large flower size, colour and compact foliage.
- 'Lemon Princess' is thought to be a hybrid between X. bracteatum and X. viscosum.
