= C18H30O3 =

The molecular formula C_{18}H_{30}O_{3} may refer to:

- Helenynolic acid
- Juvenile hormone I
