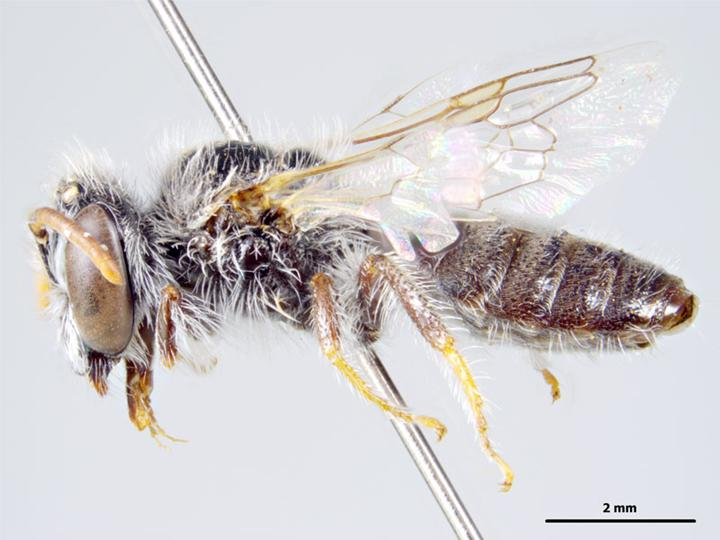
- Male

Scientific classification
- Kingdom: Animalia
- Phylum: Arthropoda
- Clade: Pancrustacea
- Class: Insecta
- Order: Hymenoptera
- Family: Colletidae
- Genus: Leioproctus
- Species: L. helichrysi

Binomial name
- Leioproctus helichrysi (Cockerell, 1918)

Synonyms
- Paracolletes helichrysi Cockerell, 1918

= Leioproctus helichrysi =

Species of bee

Leioproctus helichrysi, or Leioproctus (Minycolletes) helichrysi, is a species of bee in the family Colletidae and subfamily Colletinae. It is endemic to Australia. It was described by British-American entomologist Theodore Dru Alison Cockerell in 1918.

== Description ==
Female body length is 7 mm. Colouration is mainly black with brownish markings, with greyish-white to brown hair.

== Distribution and habitat ==
The species occurs in eastern Australia. The type locality is Tamborine Mountain in south-east Queensland.

== Behaviour ==
The adults are flying mellivores. Flowering plants visited by the bees include Xerochrysum bracteatum.

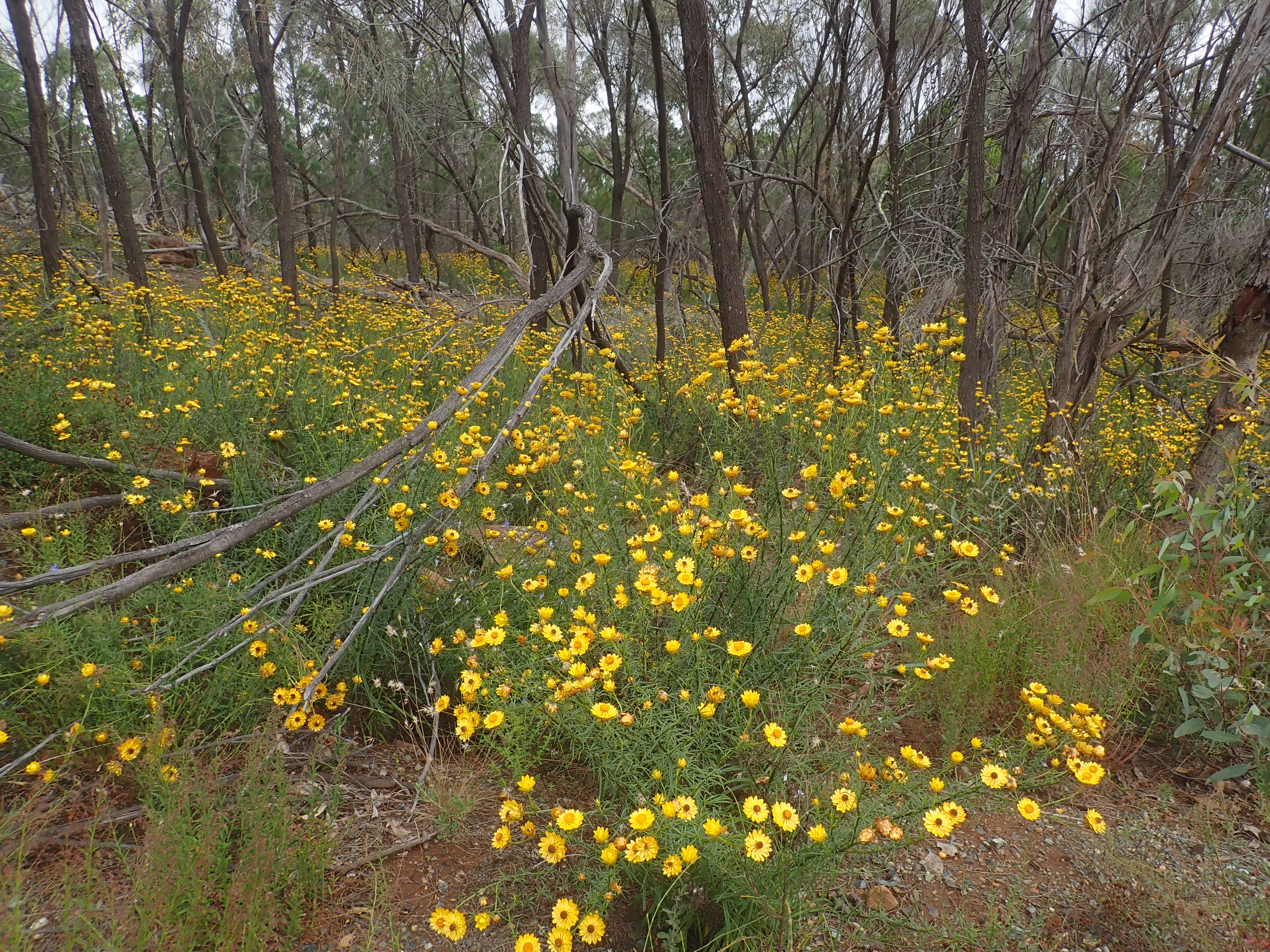
Xerochrysum bracteatum (golden everlasting), a forage plant of the bees
