= Xerochrysum papillosum =

Scientific classification
- Kingdom: Plantae
- Clade: Tracheophytes
- Clade: Angiosperms
- Clade: Eudicots
- Clade: Asterids
- Order: Asterales
- Family: Asteraceae
- Genus: Xerochrysum
- Species: X. papillosum

Binomial name
- Xerochrysum papillosum (Labill.) R.J.Bayer

Species of shrub

Xerochrysum papillosum is a herbaceous shrub in the family Asteraceae, native to southern Victoria and Tasmania. It was known variously as Xeranthemum papillosum, Helichrysum papillosum, and Bracteantha papillosa before gaining its current name in 2001.

It is a perennial herb, which grows anywhere from 15 cm to 1 m in height and a similar size in diameter, and is usually simple or few-branched. The leaves are lanceolate to elliptic and range from 5 to 15 cm long by 0.5 to 2 cm wide. The flowerheads are on stalks and have a diameter of 2 to 5 cm (1 to 2 in).The inflorescence bracts are papery, the outer ones greenish yellow in colour, and the inner ones pink-tinged white. It is difficult to distinguish from white flowered forms of X. bracteatum.
