= Xerochrysum boreale =

Scientific classification
- Kingdom: Plantae
- Clade: Tracheophytes
- Clade: Angiosperms
- Clade: Eudicots
- Clade: Asterids
- Order: Asterales
- Family: Asteraceae
- Genus: Xerochrysum
- Species: X. boreale

Binomial name
- Xerochrysum boreale Paul G.Wilson

Species of plant

Xerochrysum boreale is a species of plant native to the northern parts of the Australian states of Western Australia, the Northern Territory and Queensland.
