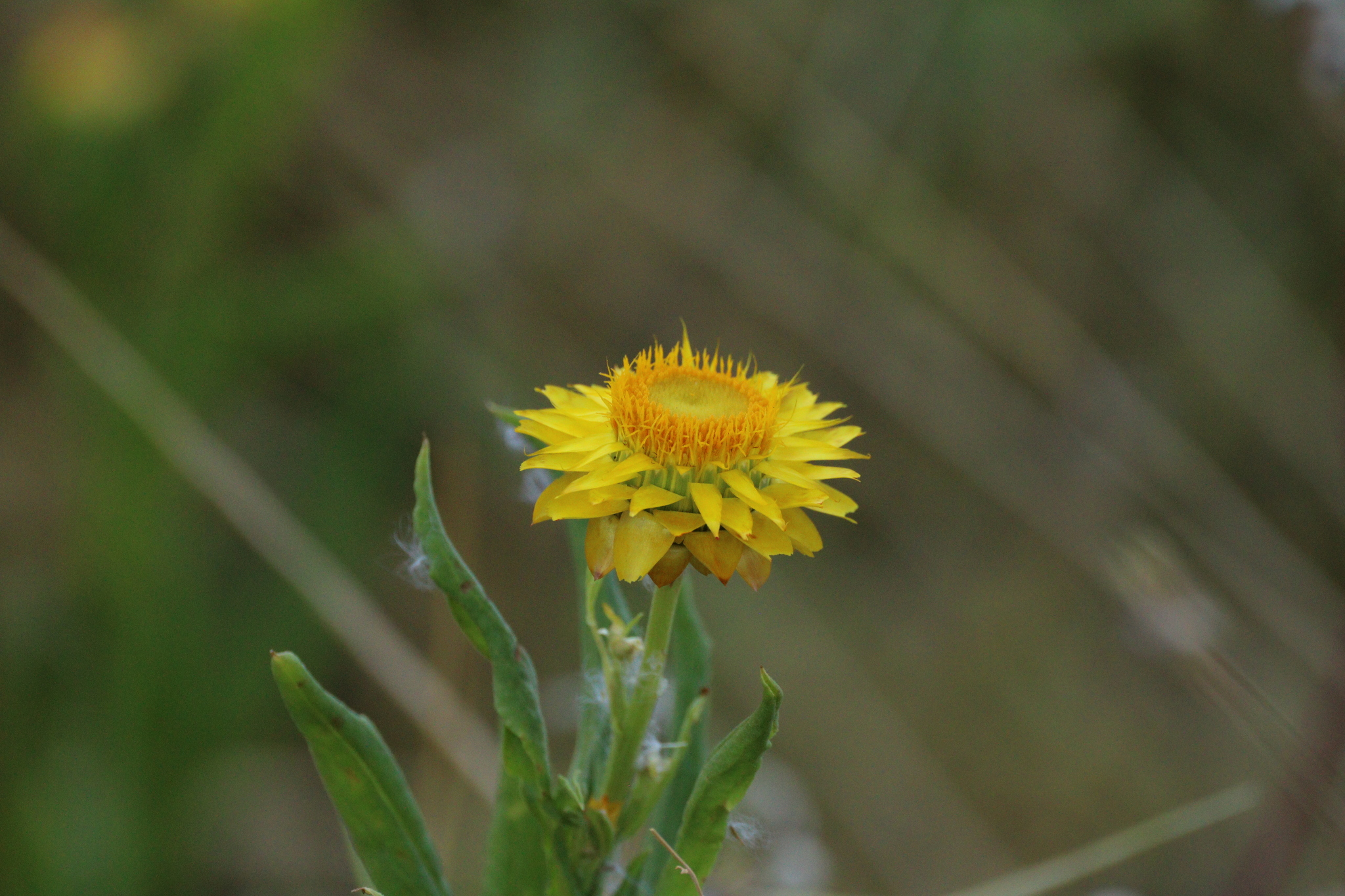

Scientific classification
- Kingdom: Plantae
- Clade: Embryophytes
- Clade: Tracheophytes
- Clade: Spermatophytes
- Clade: Angiosperms
- Clade: Eudicots
- Clade: Asterids
- Order: Asterales
- Family: Asteraceae
- Genus: Xerochrysum
- Species: X. interiore

Binomial name
- Xerochrysum interiore Paul G.Wilson

= Xerochrysum interiore =

Species of plant

Xerochrysum interiore is a flowering plant in the family Asteraceae native to Central Australia.
