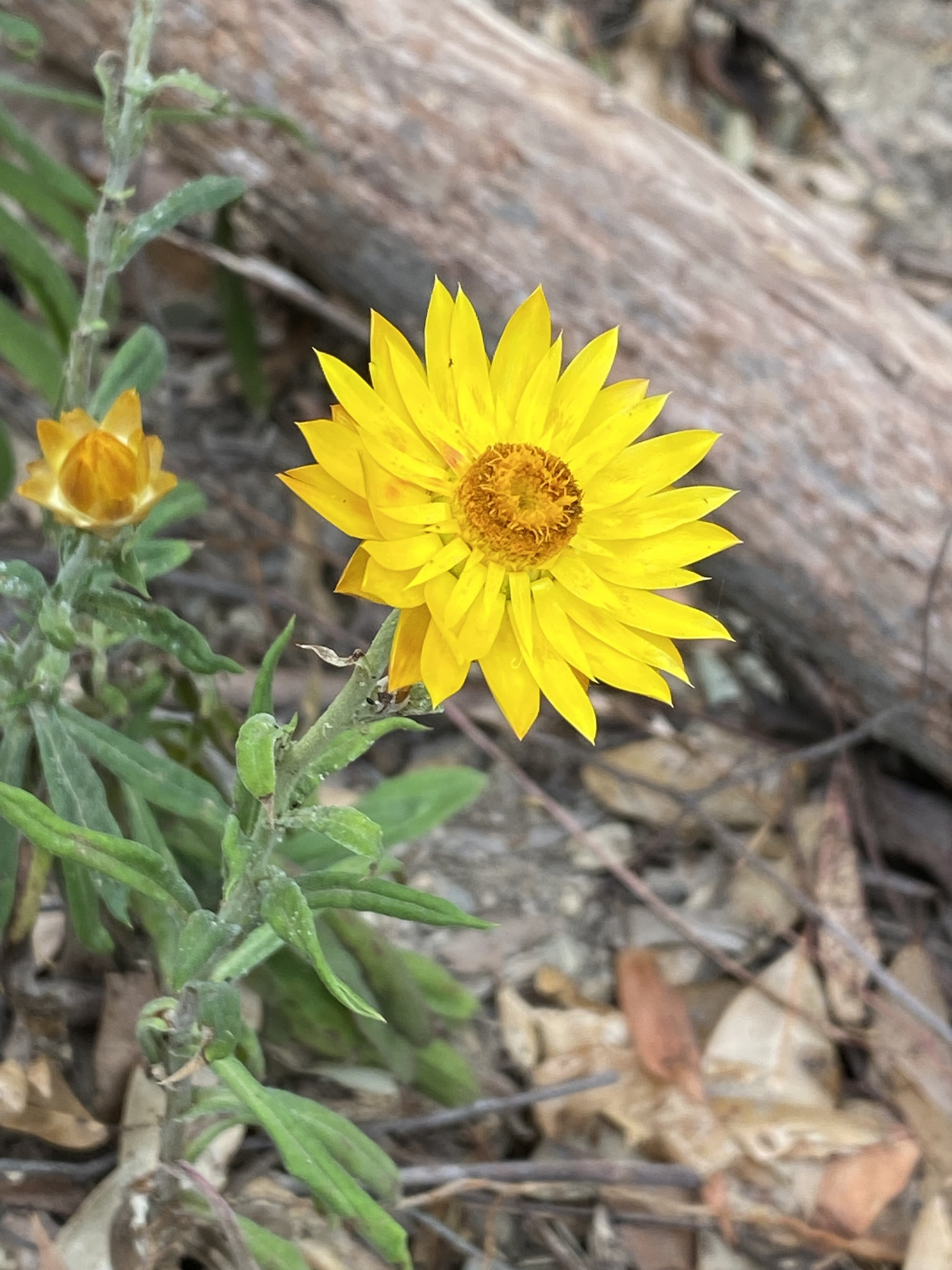

Scientific classification
- Kingdom: Plantae
- Clade: Embryophytes
- Clade: Tracheophytes
- Clade: Angiosperms
- Clade: Eudicots
- Clade: Asterids
- Order: Asterales
- Family: Asteraceae
- Genus: Xerochrysum
- Species: X. macsweeneyorum

Binomial name
- Xerochrysum macsweeneyorum T.L.Collins

= Xerochrysum macsweeneyorum =

Species of plant

Xerochrysum macsweeneyorum is a flowering plant in the family Asteraceae native to the Australian states of New South Wales and Queensland.

Xerochrysum macsweeneyorum

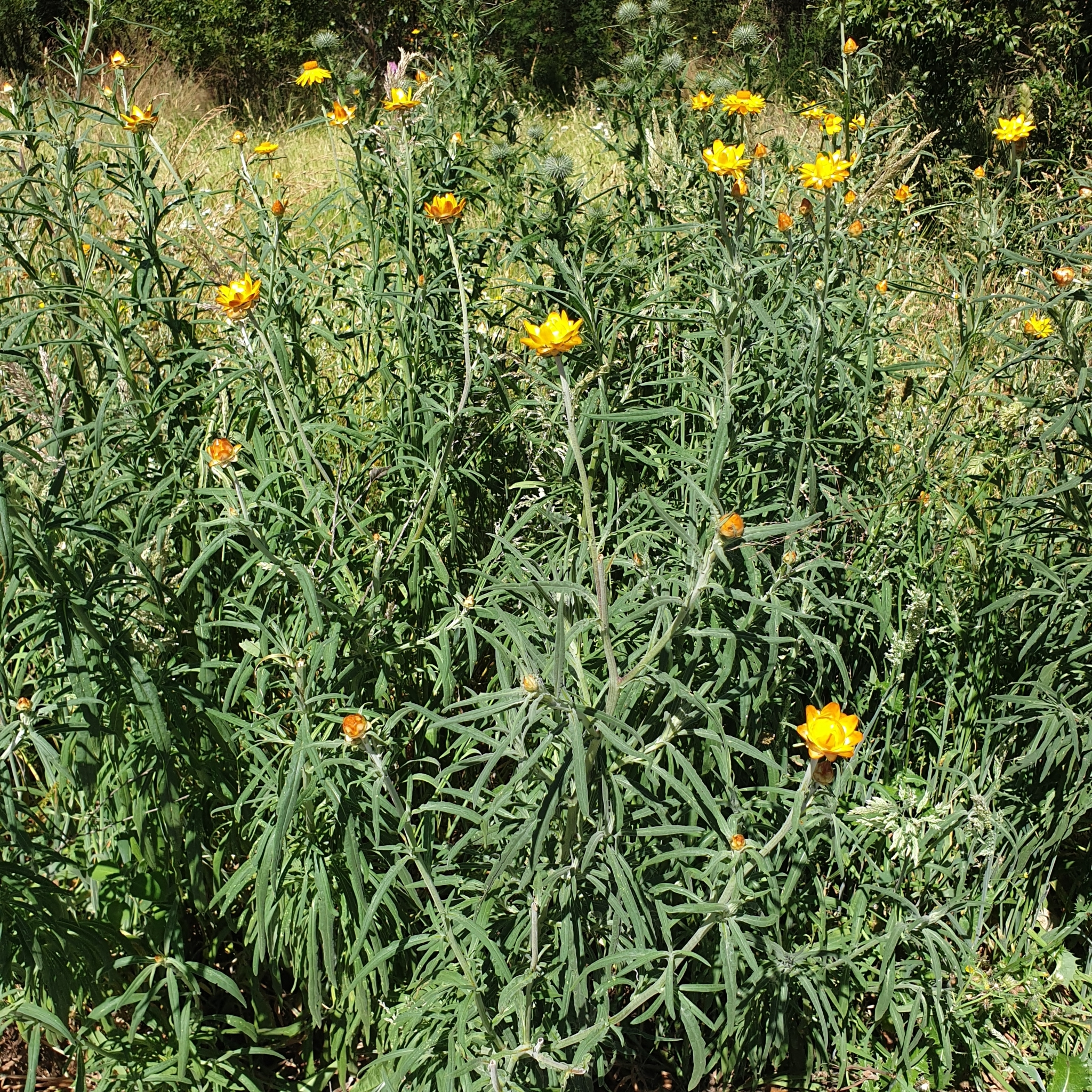
Xerochrysum macsweeneyorum habit

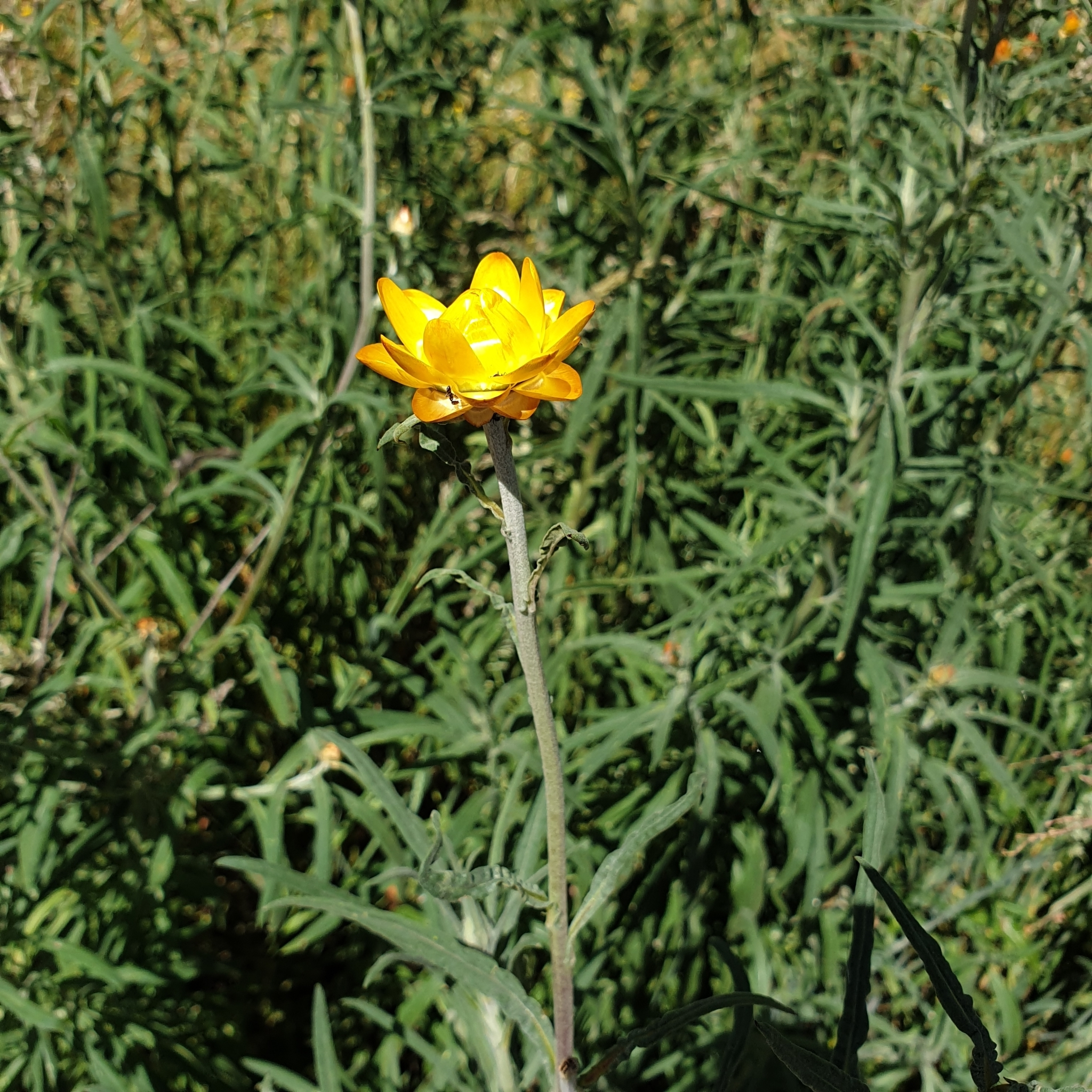
Xerochrysum macsweeneyorum

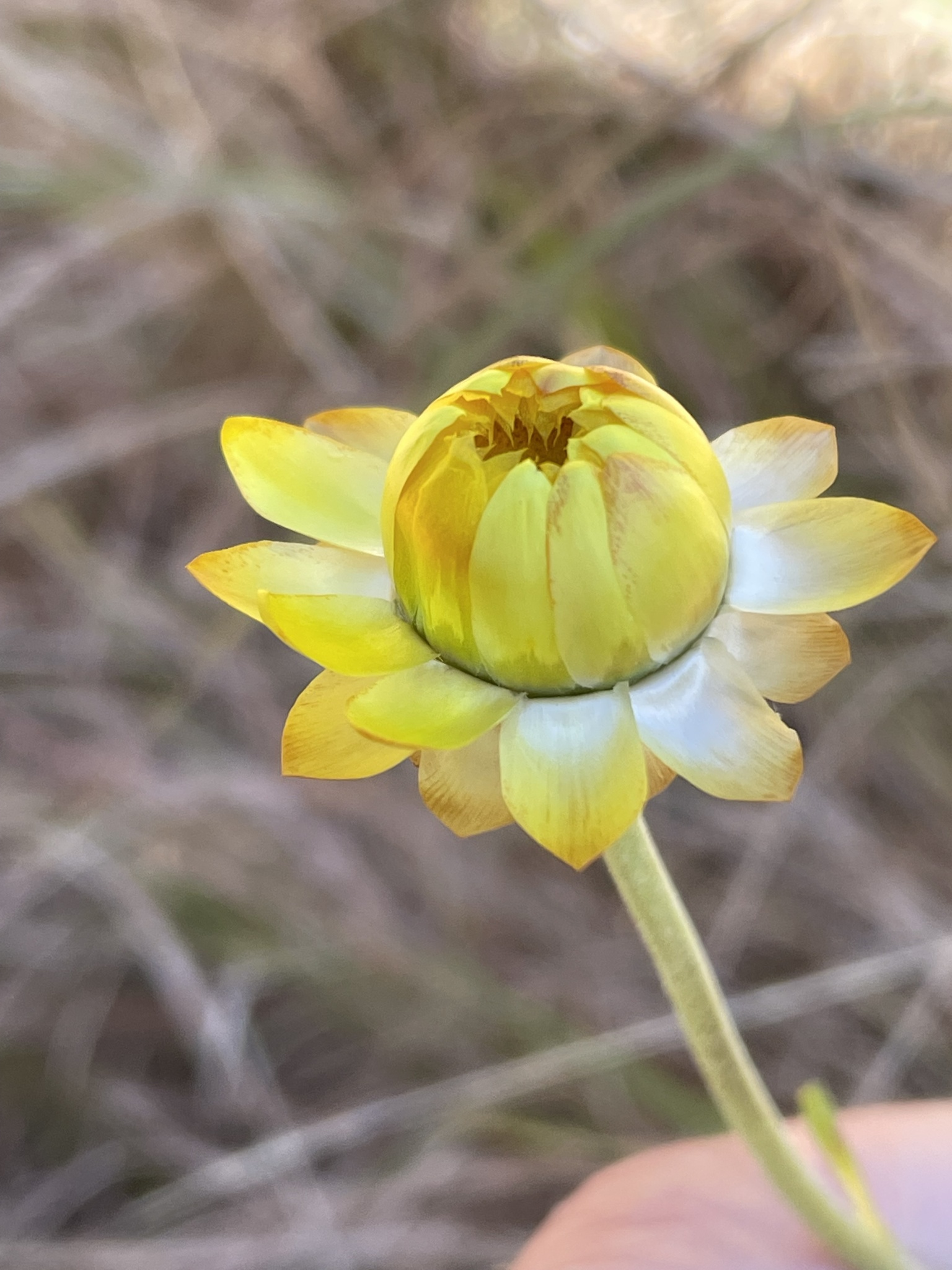
Xerochrysum macsweeneyorum flower head

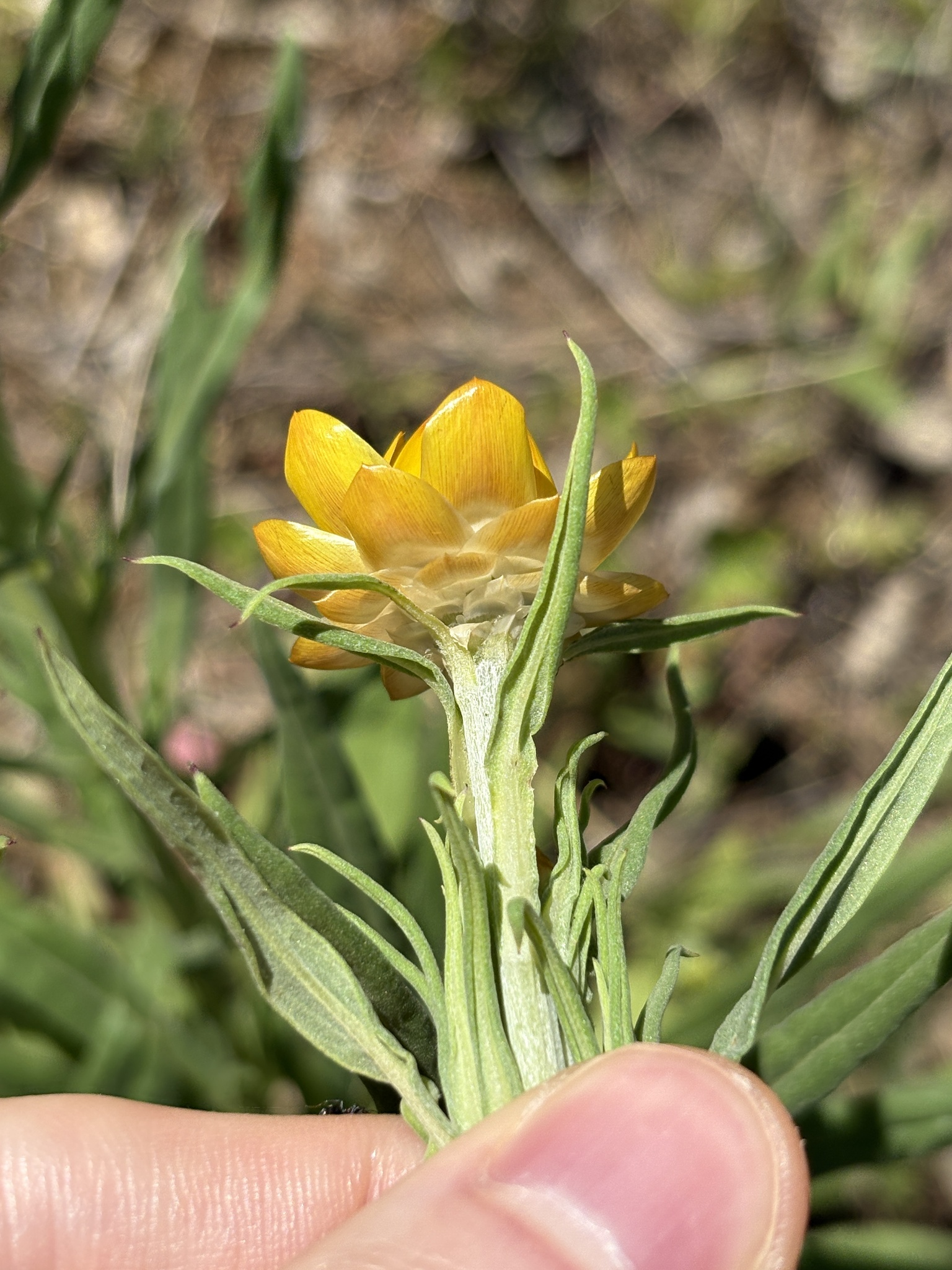
Xerochrysum macsweeneyorum stem
