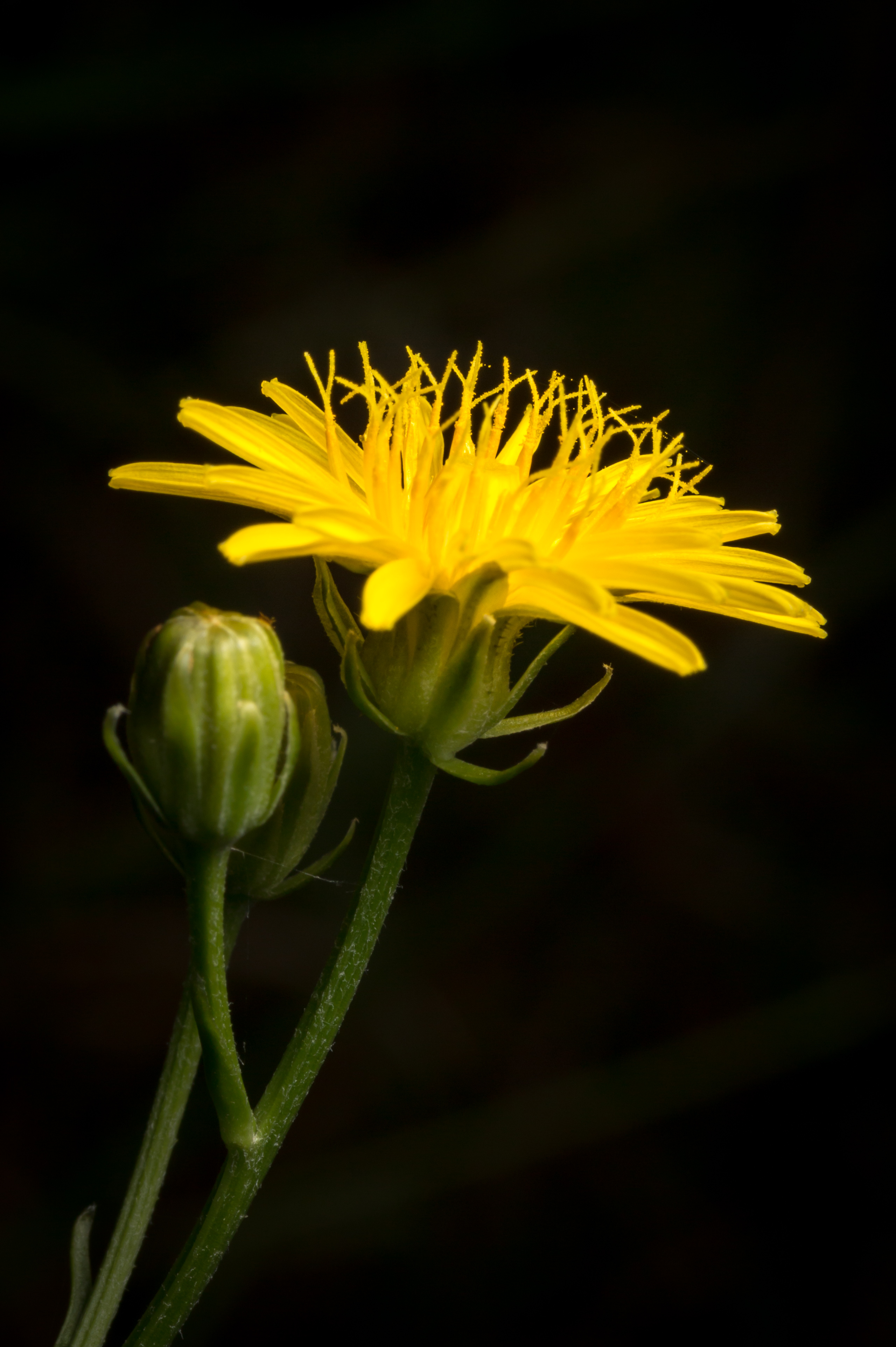

Scientific classification
- Kingdom: Plantae
- Clade: Tracheophytes
- Clade: Angiosperms
- Clade: Eudicots
- Clade: Asterids
- Order: Asterales
- Family: Asteraceae
- Genus: Crepis
- Species: C. vesicaria

Binomial name
- Crepis vesicaria L.

Synonyms
- Synonymy: Barkhausia hiemalis Spreng.; Barkhausia leucorhodia Rchb.; Barkhausia macrophylla (Desf.) Spreng.; Barkhausia raphanifolia Spreng.; Barkhausia scariosa (Willd.) Rchb.; Barkhausia taraxacoides Rchb.; Barkhausia vesicaria (L.) Spreng.; Crepis bicolor Rchb.; Crepis hiemalis Biv.; Crepis macrophylla Desf.; Crepis raphanifolia Willd.; Crepis raphanifolia Hornem.; Crepis scariosa Willd.; Crepis taraxacoides Desf.; Hieracioides vesicarium (L.) Kuntze; Lagoseris raphanifolia (Willd.) Link; Lagoseris taraxacoides Rchb.; Barkhausia comata Lowe, syn. of subsp. andryaloides; Barkhausia dubia Lowe, syn. of subsp. andryaloides; Barkhausia hieracioides Lowe, syn. of subsp. andryaloides; Crepis andryaloides Lowe, syn. of subsp. andryaloides; Crepis comata (Lowe) Banks & Sol., syn. of subsp. andryaloides; Crepis hieracioides (Lowe) F.W.Schultz, syn. of subsp. andryaloides; Crepis lowei Sch.Bip., syn. of subsp. andryaloides; Hieracioides loweanum Kuntze, syn. of subsp. andryaloides; Sonchus lowei (Sch.Bip.) Bolle, syn. of subsp. andryaloides; Barkhausia bivoniana Rchb., syn. of subsp. bivonana; Barkhausia purpurea Biv., syn. of subsp. bivonana; Crepis bivoniana (Rchb.) Soldano & F.Conti, syn. of subsp. bivonana; Crepis purpurea (Biv.) Steud., syn. of subsp. bivonana; Barkhausia hyemalis Biv., syn. of subsp. hyemalis; Crepis hyemalis (Biv.) Ces. & al., syn. of subsp. hyemalis; Crepis hyemalis Ces., Pass. & Gibelli, syn. of subsp. hyemalis; Crepis reflexa Guss., syn. of subsp. hyemalis; Hieracioides hyemale (Biv.) Kuntze, syn. of subsp. hyemalis; Barkhausia floribunda Pomel, syn. of subsp. myriocephala; Crepis floribunda Pomel, syn. of subsp. myriocephala; Barkhausia hirsuta Pomel, syn. of subsp. stellata; Crepis hirsuta Pomel, syn. of subsp. stellata; Crepis stellata Ball, syn. of subsp. stellata; Barkhausia hackelii (Lange) Colmeiro, syn. of subsp. taraxacifolia; Barkhausia haenseleri Boiss. ex DC., syn. of subsp. taraxacifolia; Barkhausia heterocarpa Boiss., syn. of subsp. taraxacifolia; Barkhausia intybacea (Brot.) Spreng., syn. of subsp. taraxacifolia; Barkhausia laciniata Lowe, syn. of subsp. taraxacifolia; Barkhausia numidica Pomel, syn. of subsp. taraxacifolia; Barkhausia praecox (Balb.) Rchb., syn. of subsp. taraxacifolia; Barkhausia recognita (Haller f.) DC., syn. of subsp. taraxacifolia; Barkhausia reflexa C.Presl & J.Presl, syn. of subsp. taraxacifolia; Barkhausia taraxacifolia (Thuill.) DC., syn. of subsp. taraxacifolia; Crepis cinerea Desf., syn. of subsp. taraxacifolia; Crepis hackelii Lange, syn. of subsp. taraxacifolia; Crepis haenseleri (Boiss. ex DC.) F.W.Schultz, syn. of subsp. taraxacifolia; Crepis heterocarpa Nyman, syn. of subsp. taraxacifolia; Crepis intybacea Brot., syn. of subsp. taraxacifolia; Crepis laciniata Lowe, syn. of subsp. taraxacifolia; Crepis numidica Pomel, syn. of subsp. taraxacifolia; Crepis polymorpha Pourr., syn. of subsp. taraxacifolia; Crepis praecox Balb., syn. of subsp. taraxacifolia; Crepis recognita Haller f., syn. of subsp. taraxacifolia; Crepis ruderalis Boucher, syn. of subsp. taraxacifolia; Crepis rutilans Lacaita, syn. of subsp. taraxacifolia; Crepis scabra Willd., syn. of subsp. taraxacifolia; Crepis taraxacifolia Thuill., syn. of subsp. taraxacifolia; Crepis taurinensis Willd., syn. of subsp. taraxacifolia; Crepis umbellata Thuill., syn. of subsp. taraxacifolia; Hieracioides taraxacifolium (Thuill.) Kuntze, syn. of subsp. taraxacifolia; Lagoseris intybacea (Brot.) Hoffmanns. & Link, syn. of subsp. taraxacifolia; Lagoseris taraxacifolia (Thuill.) Steud., syn. of subsp. taraxacifolia; Lagoseris taurinensis (Willd.) Link, syn. of subsp. taraxacifolia

= Crepis vesicaria =

Species of flowering plant

Crepis vesicaria is a European species of flowering plant in the family Asteraceae with the common name beaked hawk's-beard. It is native to the Western and Southern Europe from Ireland and Portugal east as far as Germany, Austria, and Greece. It became naturalized in scattered locations in North America.

Crepis vesicaria is an annual, biennial, or perennial herb up to 120 cm (48 inches or 4 feet) tall, producing a large underground caudex. Each plant can have as many as 20 flower heads, each with up to 70 ray florets but no disc florets. It grows on hillsides and in sandy clearings.

A prominent plant, Crepis vesicaria stands erect, with many branches, each ending in its own dandelion-like flower.

The underside of the flower has two layers of leaf-like phyllaries. The inner layer is longer and pointed, and often curls back away from the rest of the flower head. The outer layer is substantially shorter.

The plant is a source of helenynolic acid, a rare fatty acid.

== Subspecies ==
Subspecies include:

- Crepis vesicaria subsp. andryaloides (Lowe) Babc.
- Crepis vesicaria subsp. bivonana (Soldano & F.Conti) Giardina & Raimondo
- Crepis vesicaria subsp. hyemalis (Biv.) Babc.
- Crepis vesicaria subsp. myriocephala (Batt.) Babc.
- Crepis vesicaria subsp. stellata (Ball) Babc.
- Crepis vesicaria subsp. taraxacifolia (Thuill.) Thell.
- Crepis vesicaria subsp. vesicaria
