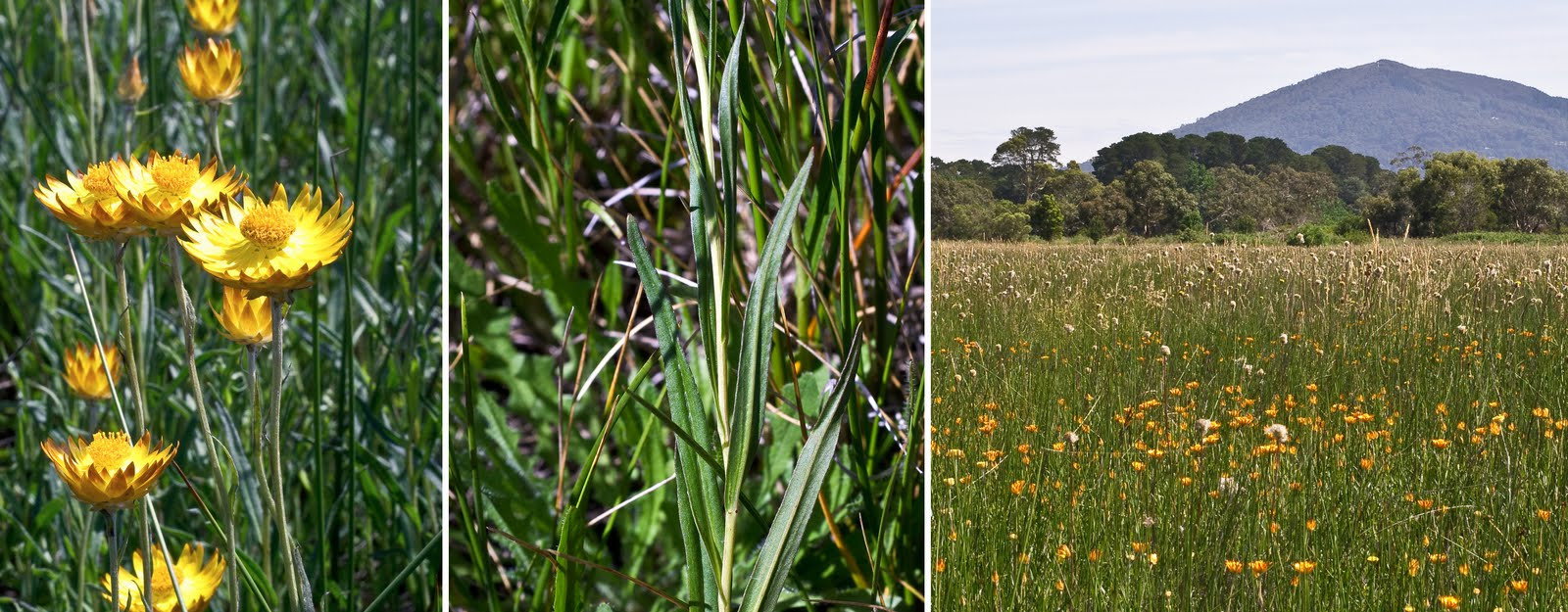

Scientific classification
- Kingdom: Plantae
- Clade: Tracheophytes
- Clade: Angiosperms
- Clade: Eudicots
- Clade: Asterids
- Order: Asterales
- Family: Asteraceae
- Genus: Xerochrysum
- Species: X. palustre

Binomial name
- Xerochrysum palustre (Flann) R.J.Bayer

Synonyms
- Bracteantha palustris Flann; Helichrysum acuminatum var. angustifolium DC.

= Xerochrysum palustre =

Species of plant

Xerochrysum palustre is a flowering plant in the family Asteraceae native to Australia.
