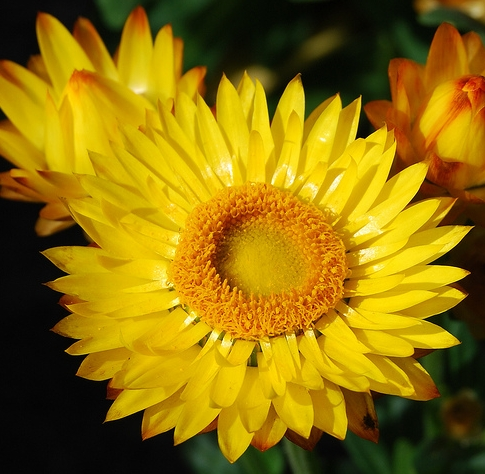

Scientific classification
- Kingdom: Plantae
- Clade: Tracheophytes
- Clade: Angiosperms
- Clade: Eudicots
- Clade: Asterids
- Order: Asterales
- Family: Asteraceae
- Genus: Xerochrysum
- Species: X. bicolor

Binomial name
- Xerochrysum bicolor (Lindl.) R.J.Bayer

= Xerochrysum bicolor =

Species of flowering plant

Xerochrysum bicolor is a flowering plant in the family Asteraceae, native to Tasmania, where it is found in wetter habitats near the coast. It was originally described by Lindley in 1835 as Helichrysum bicolor, before gaining its current name in 2001.

It is a compact annual or perennial, which normally grows to about 40 cm in height and 50 cm wide, and is usually simple or few-branched. The leaves are lanceolate and range from 2.5 to 10 cm long by 0.3 to 1.4 cm wide. The flowerheads are on stalks and have a diameter of 3 to 4 cm. The inflorescence bracts are papery, the outer ones orange-brown in colour, and the inner ones yellow. It is distinguished from Xerochrysum bracteatum by its narrower leaves.

The species may be sunk into X. bracteatum in a future revision.
