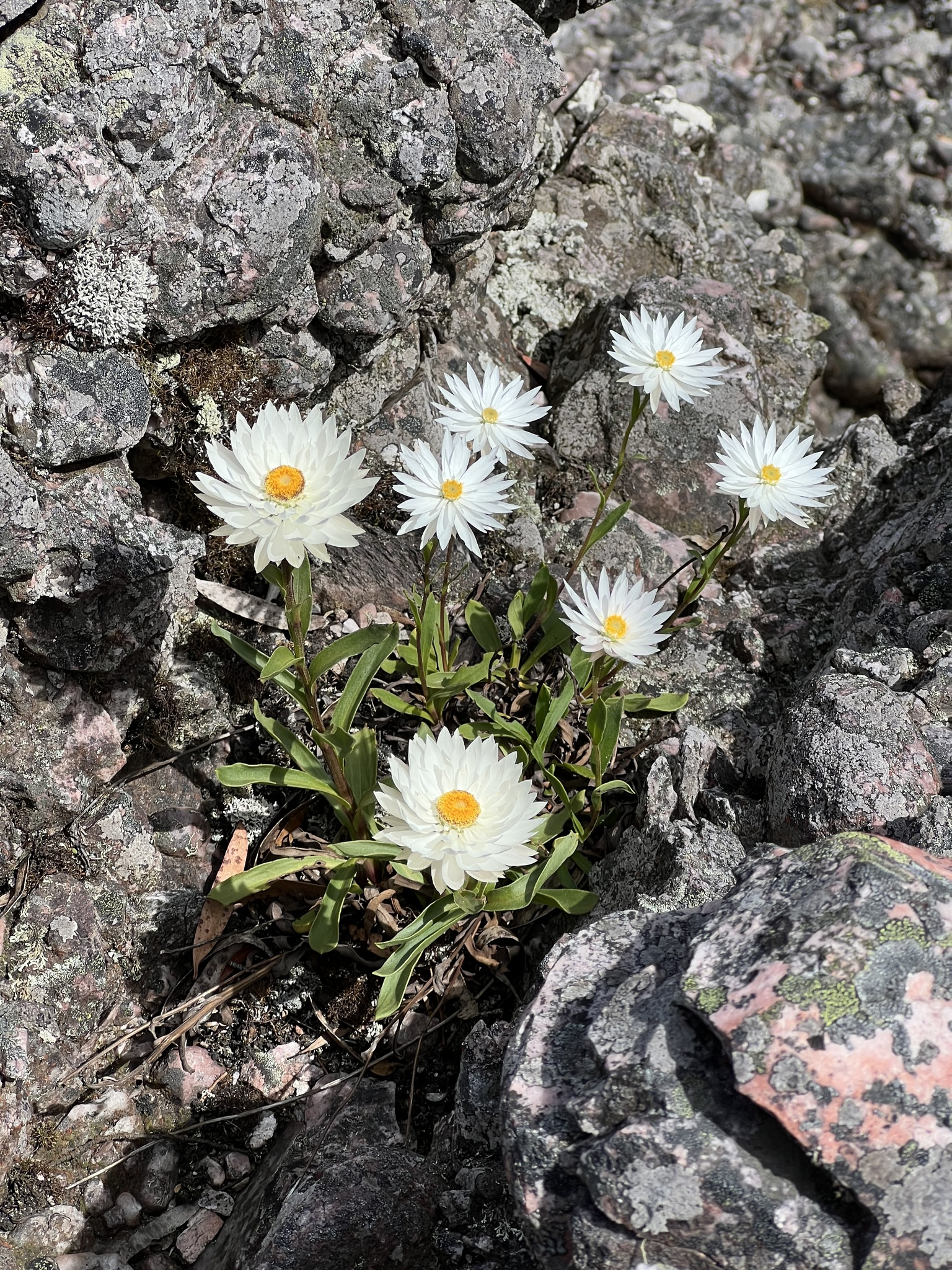

Scientific classification
- Kingdom: Plantae
- Clade: Embryophytes
- Clade: Tracheophytes
- Clade: Spermatophytes
- Clade: Angiosperms
- Clade: Eudicots
- Clade: Asterids
- Order: Asterales
- Family: Asteraceae
- Genus: Xerochrysum
- Species: X. collierianum

Binomial name
- Xerochrysum collierianum A.M.Buchanan

= Xerochrysum collierianum =

Species of plant

Xerochrysum collierianum is a species of plant in the tribe Gnaphalieae. It is native to Tasmania.
