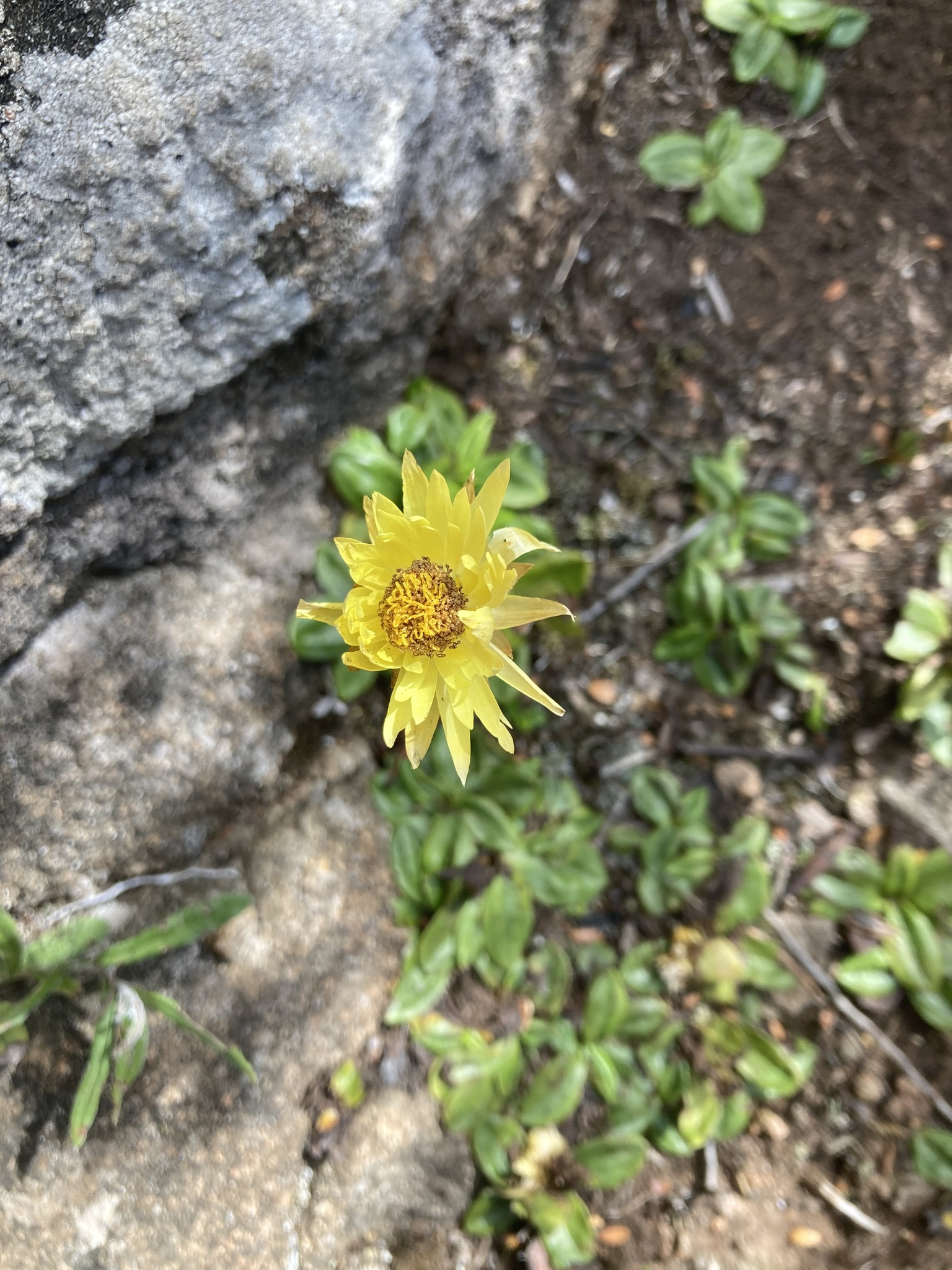

Scientific classification
- Kingdom: Plantae
- Clade: Tracheophytes
- Clade: Angiosperms
- Clade: Eudicots
- Clade: Asterids
- Order: Asterales
- Family: Asteraceae
- Genus: Xerochrysum
- Species: X. alpinum

Binomial name
- Xerochrysum alpinum Paul G.Wilson

= Xerochrysum alpinum =

Species of plant

Xerochrysum alpinum is a species of flowering plant in the family Asteraceae native to the Australian state of Tasmania.
