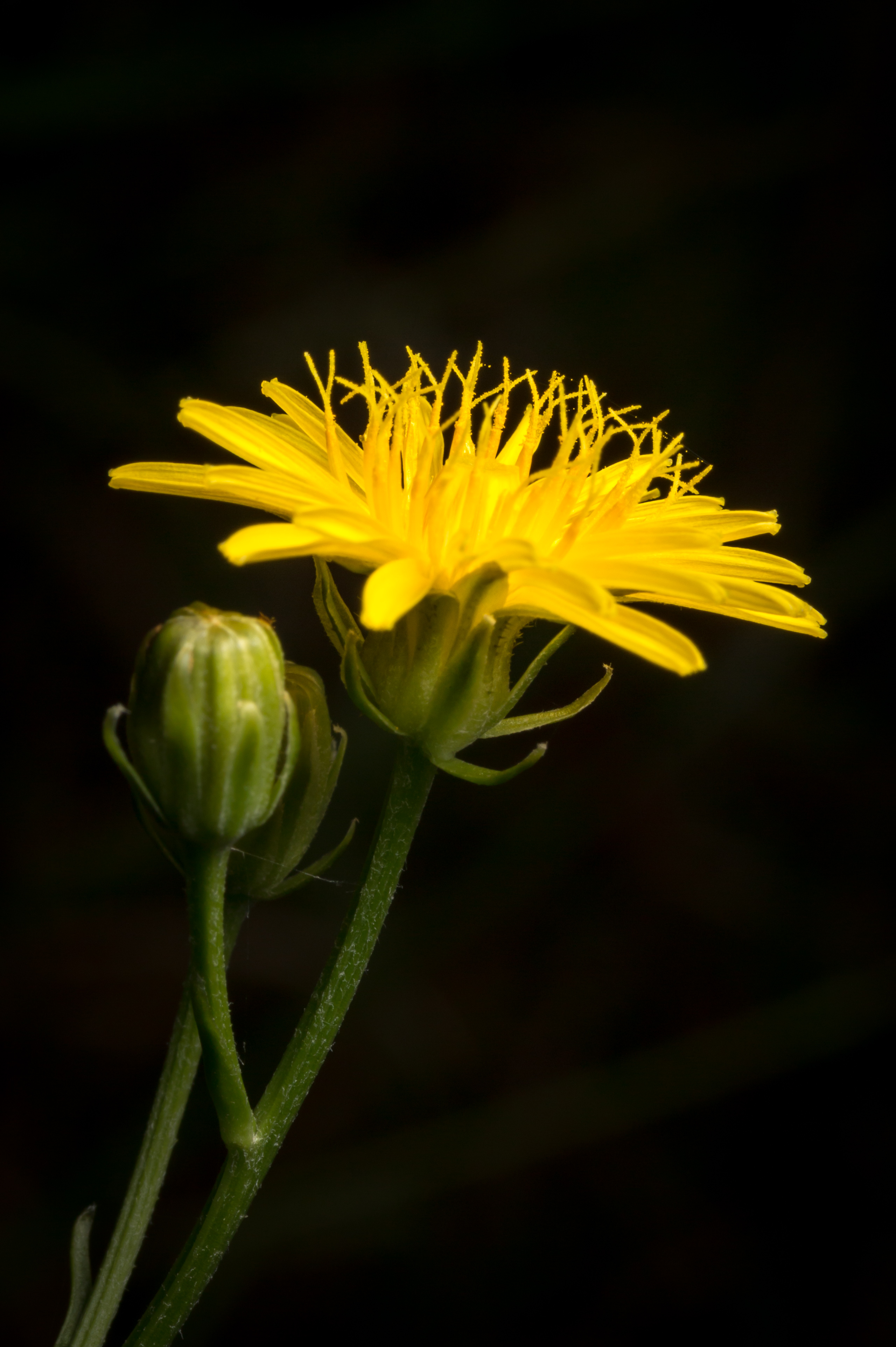

Scientific classification
- Kingdom: Plantae
- Clade: Tracheophytes
- Clade: Angiosperms
- Clade: Eudicots
- Clade: Asterids
- Order: Asterales
- Family: Asteraceae
- Genus: Crepis
- Species: C. vesicaria
- Subspecies: C. v. subsp. taraxacifolia

Trinomial name
- Crepis vesicaria subsp. taraxacifolia (Thuill.) Thell.

= Crepis vesicaria subsp. taraxacifolia =

Subspecies of flowering plant

Crepis vesicaria subsp. taraxacifolia, the beaked hawksbeard, is a subspecies of flowering plant in the family Asteraceae. It is native to Europe and northwest Africa. It has become naturalized in scattered locations in the United Kingdom, North America, and Oceania.

== Description ==
Crepis vesicaria subsp. taraxacifolia reaches 4 ft (120 cm) in height, with each of many branches producing yellow, dandelion-like flower heads at the tips.

At the base of the plant are long leaves 4 to 14 in (10 to 36 cm). Smaller leaves connect directly to the stem. Leaves are irregularly and deeply lobed.

The underside of each flower head has two layers of leaf-like phyllaries. The inner phyllaries are longer and pointed, and often curl back away from the flower head. The outer layer of phyllaries is substantially shorter.
