= Helenynolic acid =

Names
- IUPAC name (E,9S)-9-hydroxyoctadec-10-en-12-ynoic acid

Identifiers
CAS Number	7309-58-2
3D model (JSmol)	Interactive image
ChEBI	CHEBI:186674
ChemSpider	16735844
PubChem CID	20054934
UNII	1E055S6JHN
- InChI: InChI=1S/C18H30O3/c1-2-3-4-5-6-8-11-14-17(19)15-12-9-7-10-13-16-18(20)21/h11,14,17,19H,2-5,7,9-10,12-13,15-16H2,1H3,(H,20,21)/b14-11+/t17-/m1/s1 Key: AUBZNAUZNGCKAN-GWKQRERASA-N
- SMILES: CCCCCC#CC=CC(CCCCCCCC(=O)O)O

Properties
Chemical formula	C_{18}H_{30}O_{3}
Molar mass	294.435 g·mol^{−1}
- Except where otherwise noted, data are given for materials in their standard state (at 25 °C [77 °F], 100 kPa). Infobox references

Helenynolic acid is a hydroxylated and conjugated unsaturated fatty acid containing both a double and a triple bond. The acid belongs to the class of alkyne and alkenoic acids, as well as to the enynes. It is optically active with a negative rotation, i.e., levorotatory.

The delta notation is S-9-OH-18:2Δ10t,12a.

== Discovery ==
The acid was initially isolated in 1965 from the glycerides of the seed oil of Helichrysum bracteatum of the Asteraceae family, by R. G. Powell and others.

Helenynolic acid occurs in enantiomerically pure form in Xerochrysum bracteatum. In some seeds, heleninolic acid is formed by oxidation during storage, e.g., in those of Crepis vesicaria from the genus Crepis.

The acid's presence has also been confirmed among the lipids of Helichrysum italicum.

== Synthesis ==
Racemic heleninolic acid can be synthesized starting from methyl oleate. Ozonolysis of this methyl oleate yields methyl 9-oxononanoate. Its carbon chain is extended by acetylene and 1-bromohept-1-yne, thereby forming a compound with two triple bonds. One of the triple bonds is reduced using lithium aluminum hydride.

== Uses ==
Studies on helenynolic acid and related compounds frequently explore their possible therapeutic uses. Fatty acids containing distinct functional groups, such as hydroxy and alkyne groups, have been shown to possess anti-inflammatory, antimicrobial, and anticancer properties. These characteristics position them as promising options for creating novel medications or dietary supplements.
