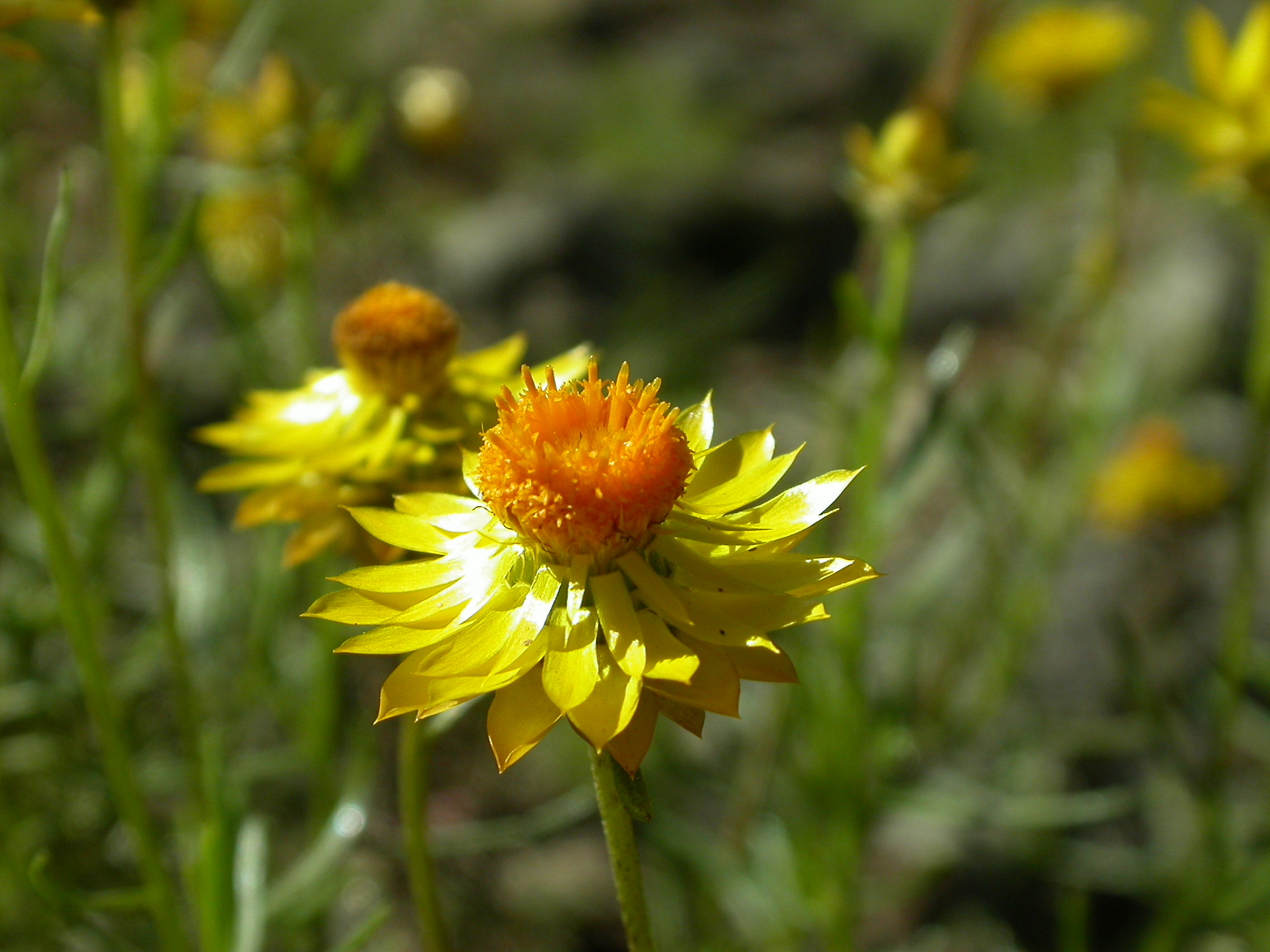

Scientific classification
- Kingdom: Plantae
- Clade: Tracheophytes
- Clade: Angiosperms
- Clade: Eudicots
- Clade: Asterids
- Order: Asterales
- Family: Asteraceae
- Genus: Xerochrysum
- Species: X. viscosum

Binomial name
- Xerochrysum viscosum (Sieber ex Spreng.) R.J.Bayer

= Xerochrysum viscosum =

Species of flowering plant

Xerochrysum viscosum (syn. Bracteantha viscosa (DC.) Anderb., Helichrysum viscosum Sieber ex Spreng., Helichrysum bracteatum var. viscosum Sieber ex DC., sticky everlasting) is a flowering plant in the family Asteraceae. The plant is native to Australia, occurring in Queensland, New South Wales, Victoria, Tasmania and the Australian Capital Territory

== Description ==
It is a sticky everlasting erect viscid herb. It is usually annual, though sometimes perennial, mainly flowers in spring and summer. The plant normally grows from 20–80 centimetres (7.9–31.5 in) high, and is usually much branched. Inflorescence bracts are papery and yellow in colour.

== Distribution and habitat ==
The plant grows in well drained soils in open woodland and sclerophyll forest across South-Eastern Australia.
