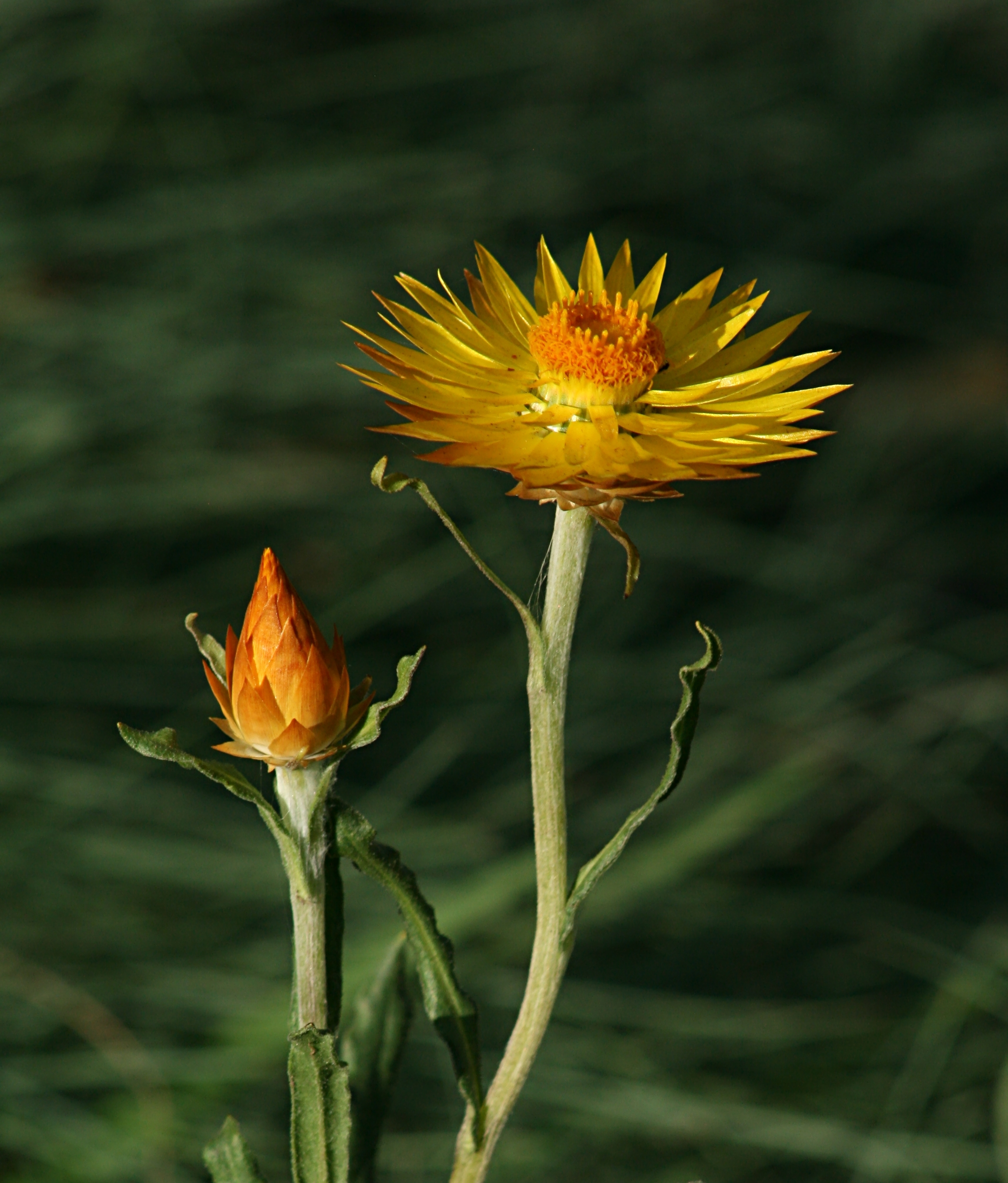
- Xerochrysum subundulatum Alpine everlasting

Scientific classification
- Kingdom: Plantae
- Clade: Tracheophytes
- Clade: Angiosperms
- Clade: Eudicots
- Clade: Asterids
- Order: Asterales
- Family: Asteraceae
- Subfamily: Asteroideae
- Tribe: Gnaphalieae
- Genus: Xerochrysum; Tzvelev

Species
- See text

= Xerochrysum =

Genus of flowering plants native to Australia

Xerochrysum (syn. Bracteantha) is a genus of flowering plants native to Australia. It was described by Russian botanist Nikolai Tzvelev in 1990, preceding (and taking precedence over) Bracteantha which was described the following year.

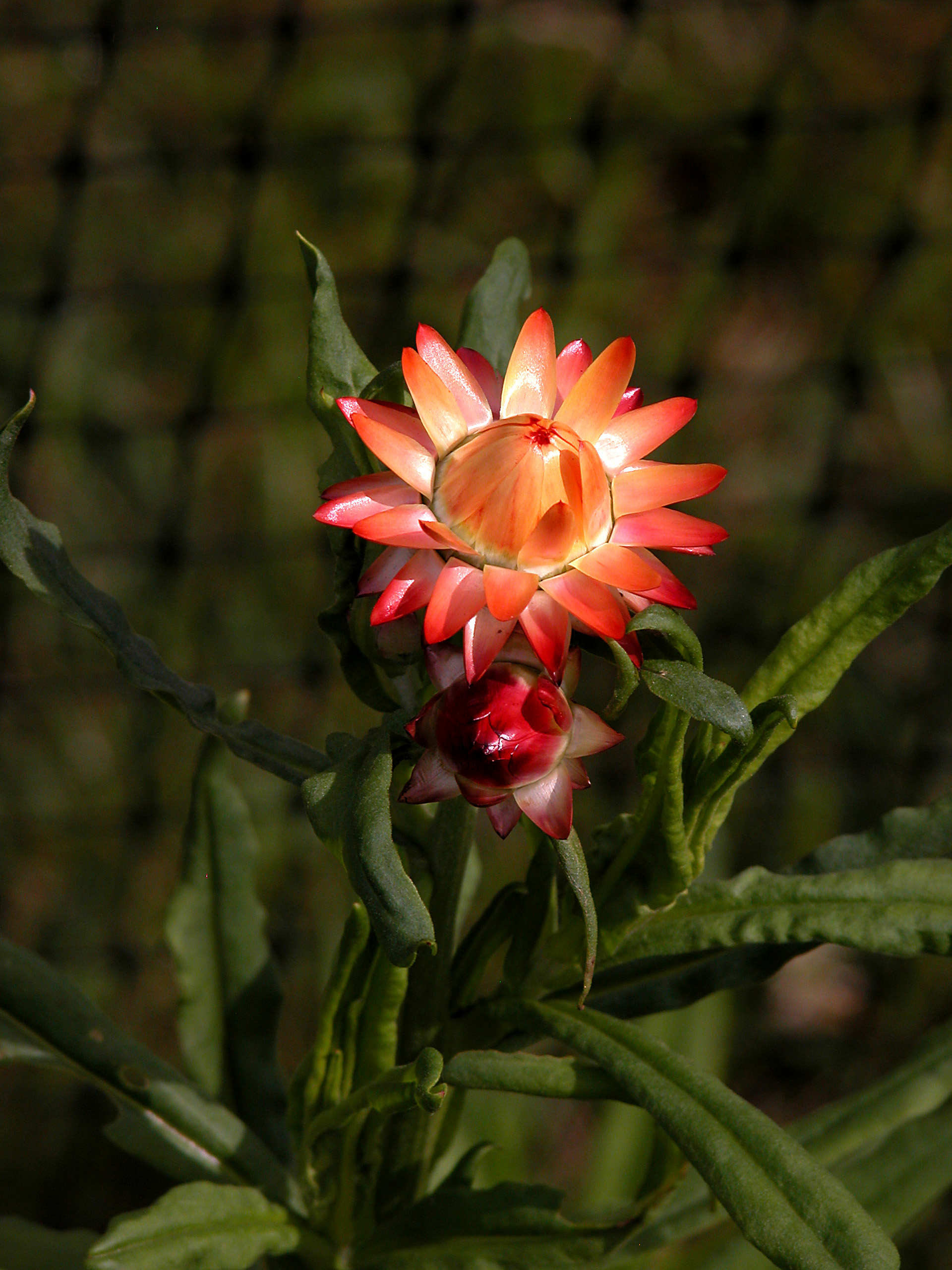
Cultivar of
Xerochrysum bracteatum

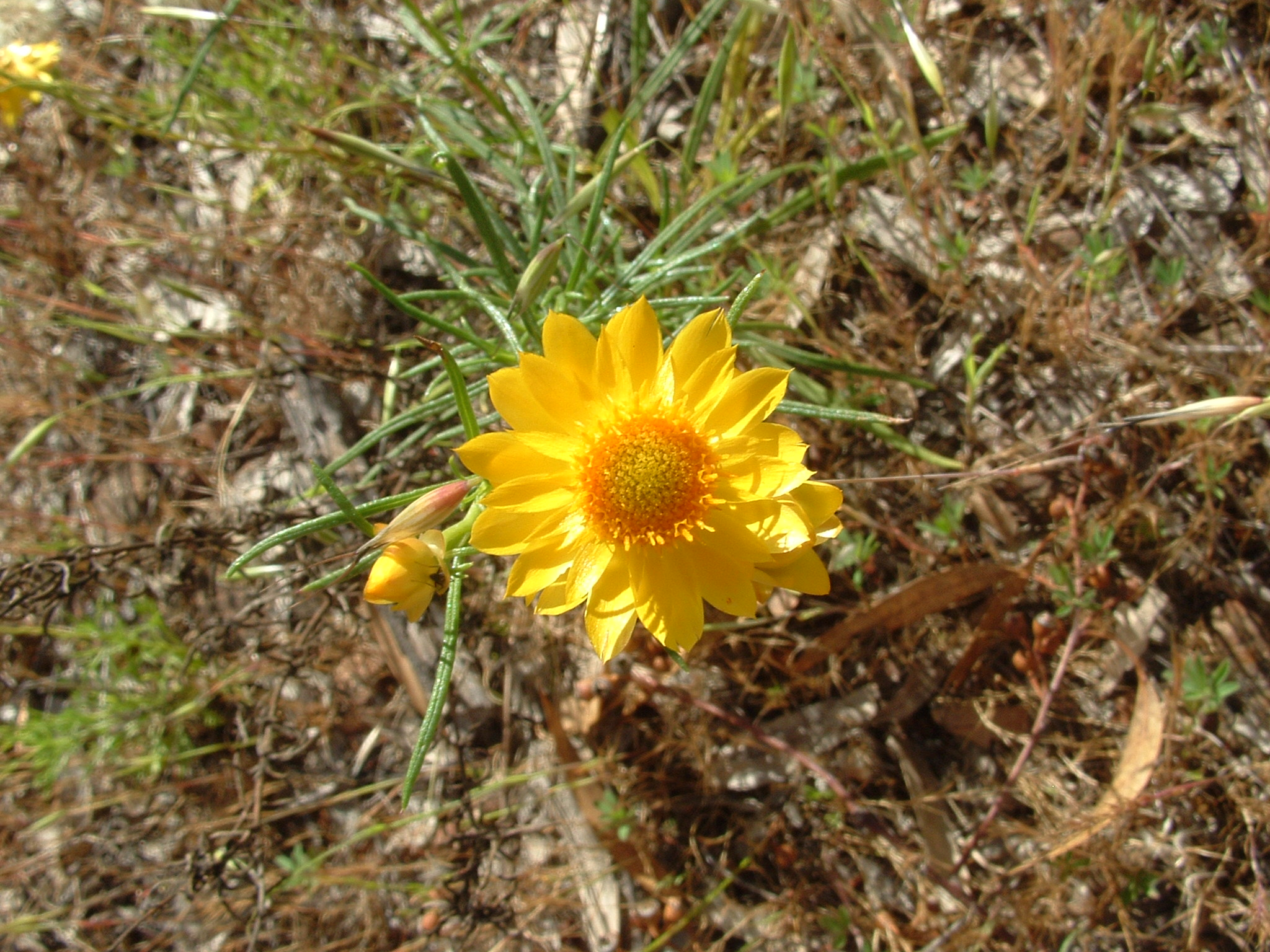
Xerochrysum viscosum Sticky Everlasting

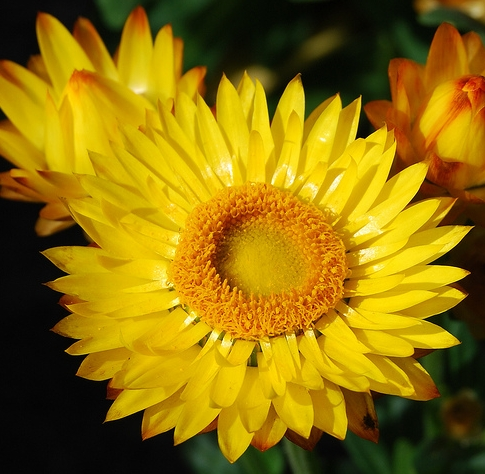
Xerochrysum bicolor

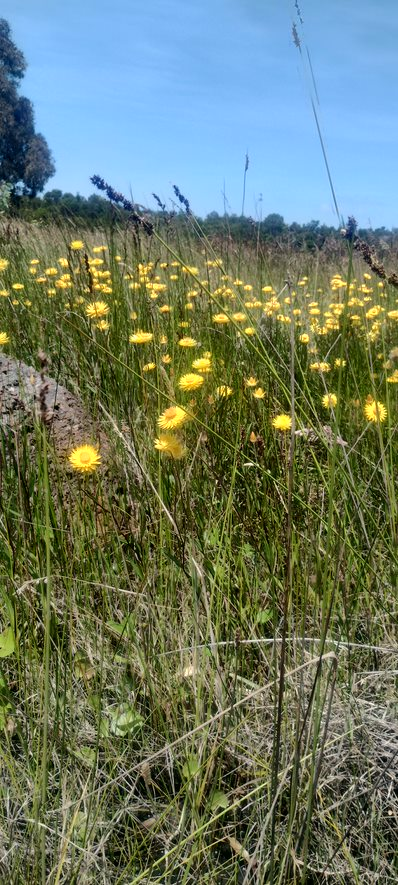
Xerochrysum palustre

== Species ==
This genus and its species names were formerly included in Bracteantha and before that in Helichrysum.

As of September 2024 the authoritative Australian Plant Census recognises thirteen formally named species and five accepted species awaiting formal naming, description and publication:

- Xerochrysum alpinum Paul G.Wilson – Tasmania
- Xerochrysum bicolor (Lindl.) R.J.Bayer – Tasmania
- Xerochrysum boreale Paul G.Wilson – WA, NT, Qld
- Xerochrysum bracteatum (Vent.) Tzvelev, strawflower or golden everlasting – NSW, Vic, Tas, SA, Qld, NT, WA
- Xerochrysum collierianum A.M.Buchanan – Tasmania
- Xerochrysum halmaturorum Paul G.Wilson – SA
- Xerochrysum interiore Paul G.Wilson – WA, NT, SA
- Xerochrysum macranthum Paul G.Wilson – WA
- Xerochrysum macsweeneyorum T.L.Collins - NSW, Qld
- Xerochrysum milliganii Paul G.Wilson – Tasmania
- Xerochrysum palustre (Flann) R.J.Bayer, swamp everlasting, syn.: Bracteantha sp. aff. subundulata – Vic, Tas
- Xerochrysum papillosum (Labill.) R.J.Bayer – Vic, Tas
- Xerochrysum subundulatum (Sch.Bip.) R.J.Bayer, alpine everlasting or orange everlasting – NSW, ACT, Vic, Tas
- Xerochrysum viscosum (Sieber ex DC.) R.J.Bayer, sticky everlasting – NSW, ACT, Qld, Vic

Species provisionally named, described and accepted by the authoritative Australian Plant Name Index while awaiting formal publication

- Xerochrysum sp. Glencoe (M.Gray 4401) NE Herbarium – Qld, NSW
- Xerochrysum sp. Mt Merino [Lamington National Park] (S.T.Blake 22869) NE Herbarium – Qld, NSW
- Xerochrysum sp. New England (L.M.Copeland 3731) NE Herbarium – NSW
- Xerochrysum sp. North Stradbroke Island (L.Durrington 675) NE Herbarium – Qld, NSW
- Xerochrysum sp. Point Lookout (I.R.Telford 12830) NE Herbarium – NSW

A large scale molecular study conducted in 2022 expands the number of Xerochrysum species to 24, but as of 2024 has not been used for the Australian Plant Census.
