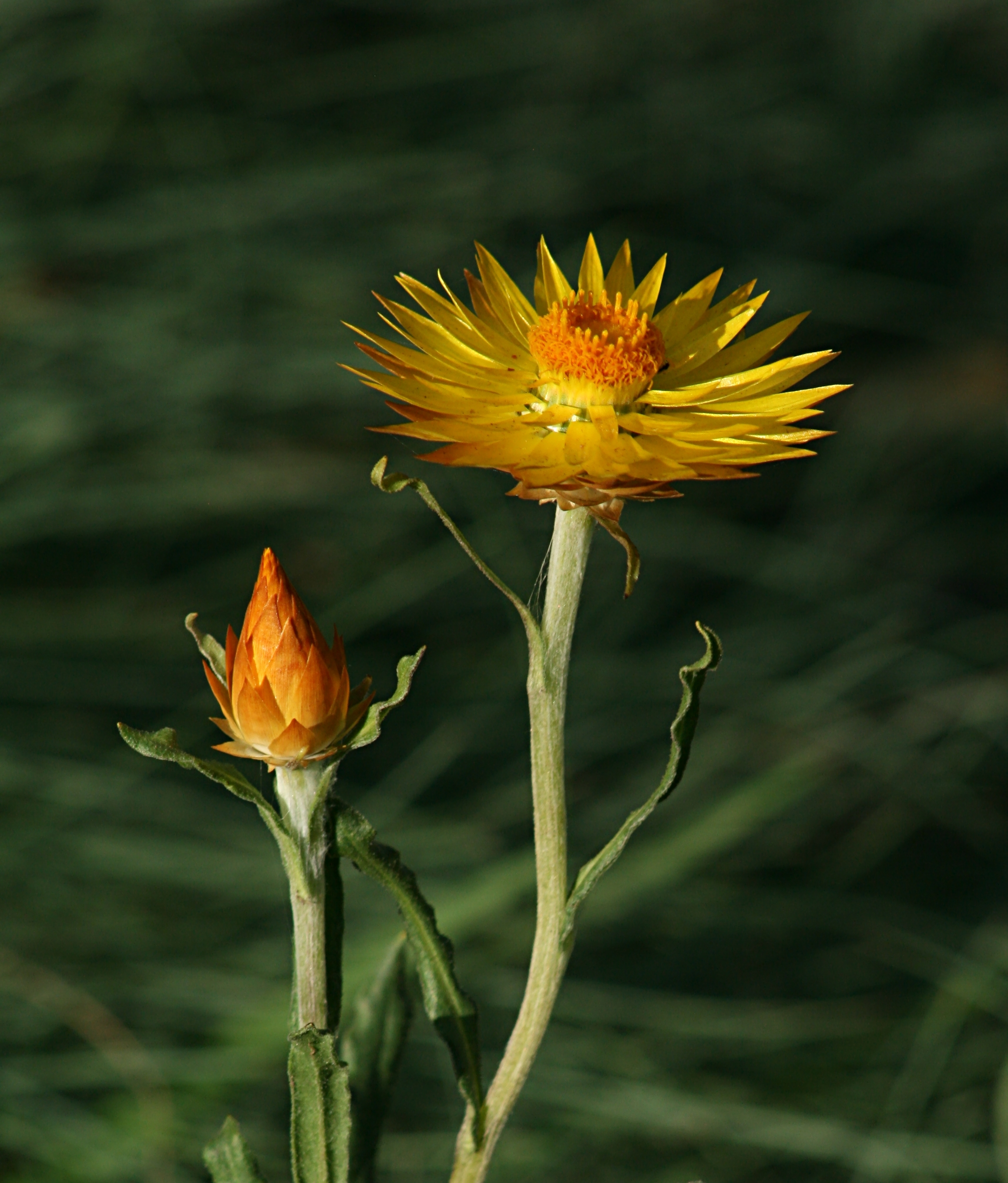

Scientific classification
- Kingdom: Plantae
- Clade: Tracheophytes
- Clade: Angiosperms
- Clade: Eudicots
- Clade: Asterids
- Order: Asterales
- Family: Asteraceae
- Genus: Xerochrysum
- Species: X. subundulatum

Binomial name
- Xerochrysum subundulatum (Sch.Bip.) R.J.Bayer

Synonyms
- Gnaphalium subundulatum (Sch.Bip.); Bracteantha subundulata (Sch.Bip.)Paul G. Wilson; Helichrysum acuminatum (DC.); Bracteantha acuminata Anderb. & Haegi; Non Gnaphaliumacuminatum acuminatum (Link) non Helichrysumacuminatum acuminatum (Link)Sweet

= Xerochrysum subundulatum =

Species of flowering plant

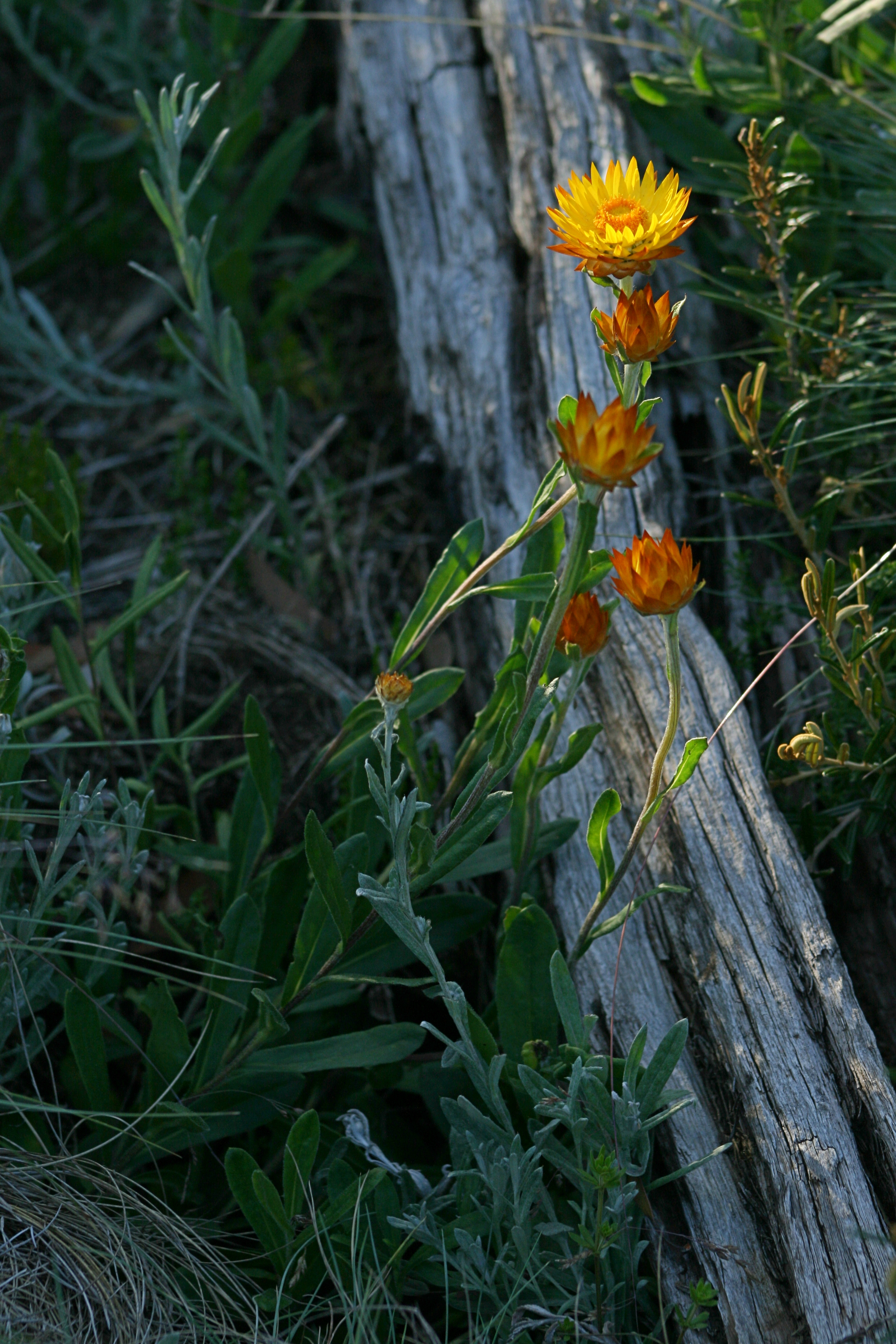
The whole plant growing amongst scrub along the Thredbo River

Xerochrysum subundulatum (commonly named the alpine everlasting or orange everlasting) is a flowering plant in the family Asteraceae, native to Australia, growing in Victoria, New South Wales and Tasmania.

It is an ascending or erect annual. The plant normally grows to about 60 cm in height, and is usually simple or few-branched Inflorescence bracts are papery and golden-yellow in colour. It has thin, fleshy roots with a mean maximum diameter of 2 mm.

Seedlings are tolerant of existing adult competition. Its post-fire regenerative strategy is by both seed and sprout.
