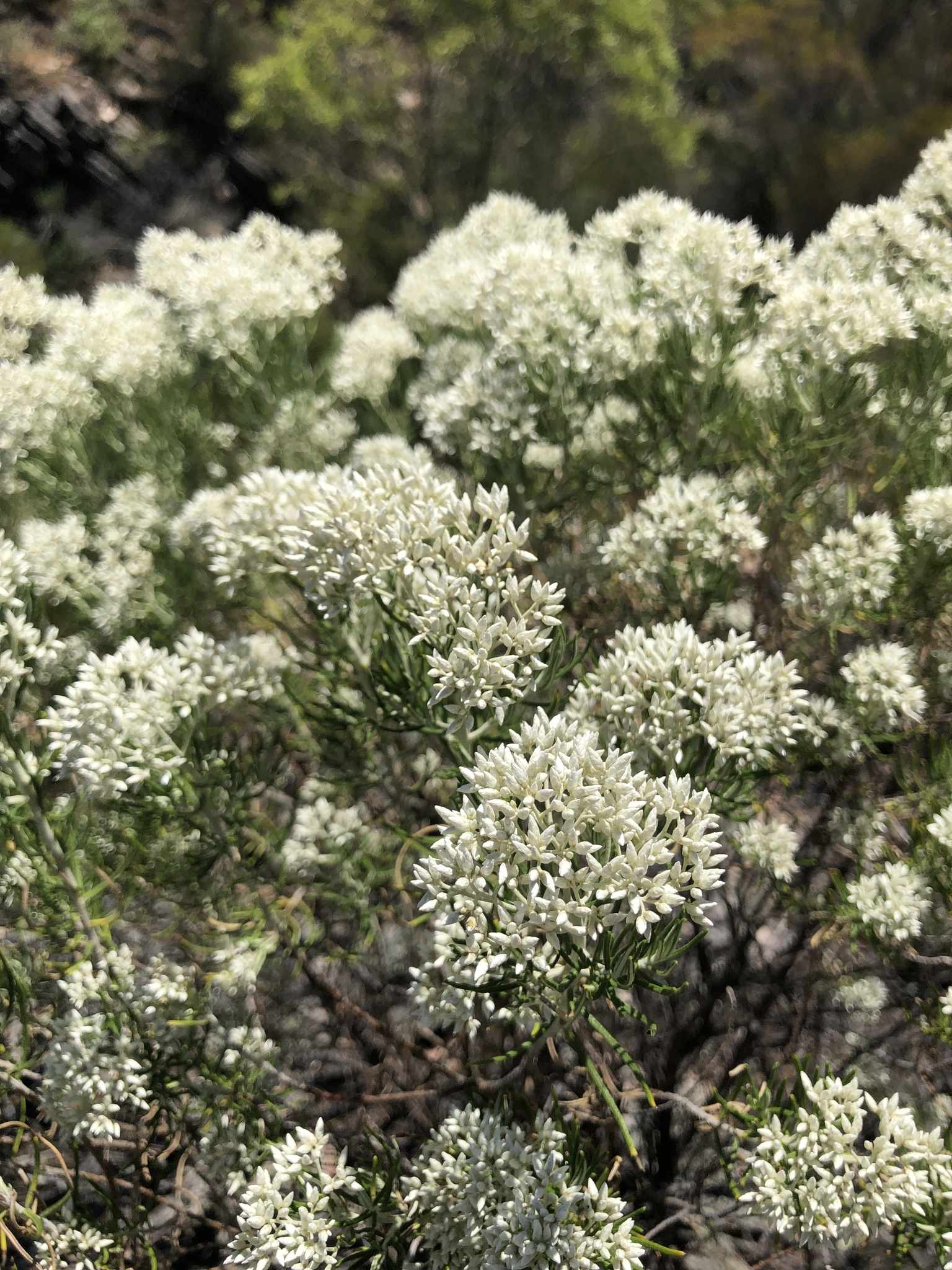

Scientific classification
- Kingdom: Plantae
- Clade: Tracheophytes
- Clade: Angiosperms
- Clade: Eudicots
- Clade: Asterids
- Order: Asterales
- Family: Asteraceae
- Genus: Cassinia
- Species: C. complanata

Binomial name
- Cassinia complanata J.M.Black

= Cassinia complanata =

Species of flowering plant

Cassinia complanata, commonly known as smooth cassinia, is a species of flowering plant in the family Asteraceae and is endemic to south-eastern Australia. It is a shrub with sticky, densely hairy stems, narrow linear to cylindrical leaves and heads of small flowers arranged in corymbs.

== Description ==
Cassinia complanata is an erect or semi-erect shrub that typically grows to a height of 0.9–1.5 m (2 ft 11 in – 4 ft 11 in), its branches sticky and densely covered with glandular hairs. The leaves are narrow linear to needle-shaped, 9–40 mm (0.35–1.57 in) long and 0.74–1.0 mm (0.029–0.039 in) wide, with sticky, cottony hairs on the lower surface. The flower heads are 3.3–4.2 mm (0.13–0.17 in) long and 2–3 mm (0.079–0.118 in) in diameter, each with five or six florets surrounded by five overlapping whorls of white involucral bracts. The heads are arranged in a corymb 5–40 mm (0.20–1.57 in) in diameter. Flowering occurs in January and February and the achenes are 1 mm (0.039 in) long with a bristly pappus about 2 mm (0.079 in) long.

== Taxonomy ==
Cassinia complanata was first formally described in 1928 by John McConnell Black in Transactions of the Royal Society of South Australia. The specific epithet (complanata) means "levelled" or "flattened".

== Distribution and habitat ==
This cassinia grows in woodland and mallee in Victoria, from the Big Desert and Little Desert areas to the Grampians, and in south-eastern South Australia .
