= Swainsona dictyocarpa =

Scientific classification
- Kingdom: Plantae
- Clade: Tracheophytes
- Clade: Angiosperms
- Clade: Eudicots
- Clade: Rosids
- Order: Fabales
- Family: Fabaceae
- Subfamily: Faboideae
- Genus: Swainsona
- Species: S. dictyocarpa

Binomial name
- Swainsona dictyocarpa J.M.Black

Species of legume

Swainsona dictyocarpa is a species of flowering plant in the family Fabaceae and is endemic to central areas of South Australia. It is a small erect perennial herb with imparipinnate leaves with 3 to 7 elliptic leaflets, and racemes of purple flowers in racemes of 2 to 6.

== Description ==
Swainsona dictyocarpa is an erect perennial herb, that typically grows to a height of up to 6 cm (2.4 in) and has gabrous stems. The leaves are imparipinnate, mostly 8–10 mm (0.31–0.39 in) long with 3 to 7 elliptic leaflets, the leaflets 5–9 mm (0.20–0.35 in) long and 2–4 mm (0.079–0.157 in) wide on a petiole 10–15 mm (0.39–0.59 in) long. There are lance-shaped stipules 1–2 mm (0.039–0.079 in) long at the base of the petioles. The flowers are purple, arranged in racemes of 2 to 6 on a peduncle 25–100 mm (0.98–3.94 in) long with bracts 1–2 mm (0.039–0.079 in) long at the base. Each flower is 8–10 mm (0.31–0.39 in) long on a pedicel about 2 mm (0.079 in) long, the sepals 5–6 mm (0.20–0.24 in) long and joined at the base with lance-shape lobes longer than the tube. The standard petal is about 10 mm (0.39 in) long, the wings about 8 mm (0.31 in) long and the keel 8 mm (0.31 in) long. Flowering usually occurs from June to October, and the fruit is a cylindrical pod 12–14 mm (0.47–0.55 in) long and 3–5 mm (0.12–0.20 in) wide.

== Taxonomy and naming ==
Swainsona dictyocarpa was first formally described in 1930 by John McConnell Black in the Transactions and Proceedings of the Royal Society of South Australia, from specimens collected by John Burton Cleland north of Lake Gairdner in 1929.

== Distribution ==
This species of pea grows in central South Australia.
