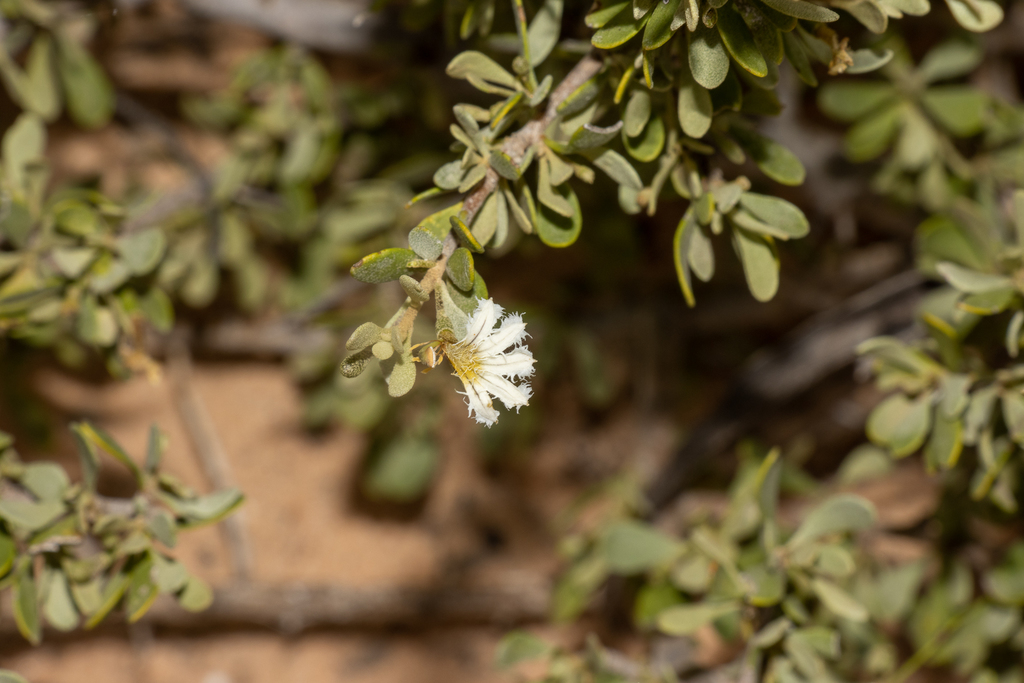

Scientific classification
- Kingdom: Plantae
- Clade: Embryophytes
- Clade: Tracheophytes
- Clade: Spermatophytes
- Clade: Angiosperms
- Clade: Eudicots
- Clade: Asterids
- Order: Asterales
- Family: Goodeniaceae
- Genus: Scaevola
- Species: S. bursariifolia

Binomial name
- Scaevola bursariifolia J.M.Black
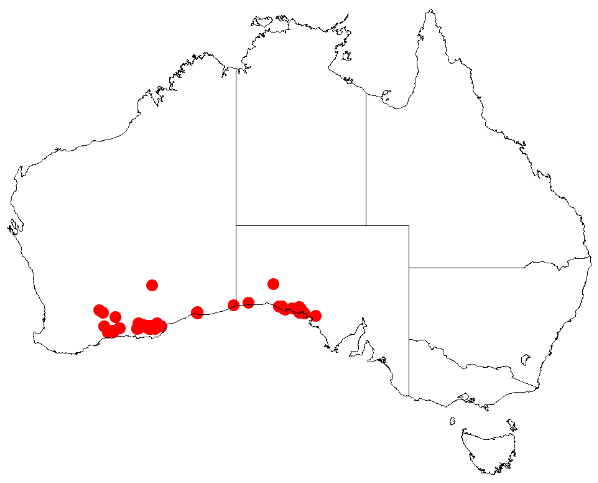
- Occurrence data from Australasian Virtual Herbarium

= Scaevola bursariifolia =

Species of shrub

Scaevola bursariifolia is a species of flowering plant in the family Goodeniaceae and is endemic to the south-west of western Australia. It is a sticky shrub with egg-shaped to spatula-shaped leaves, cream to white flowers, and glabrous, black or purple fruit.

== Description ==
Scaevola bursariifolia is a sticky, later varnished shrub that typically grows to a height of up to 70 cm (28 in) and is covered with minute, scurfy hairs. Its leaves are egg-shaped to elliptic or spatula-shaped and thick, 10–14 mm (0.39–0.55 in) long and 2–5 mm (0.079–0.197 in) wide on a short petiole. The flowers are arranged singly in leaf axils on a peduncle up to 1 mm (0.039 in) long with linear bracteoles about 1 mm (0.039 in) long. The sepals are broadly egg-shaped, up to 0.5 mm (0.020 in) long and connate, the petals cream to white, 8–10 mm (0.31–0.39 in) long, with a few varnished hairs on the outside and densely bearded inside. Flowering occurs from October to February and the fruit is oval, about 4 mm (0.16 in) long, black or purple and glabrous.

== Taxonomy ==
Scaevola bursariifolia was first formally described in 1927 by John McConnell Black in Transactions and Proceedings of the Royal Society of South Australia from specimens collected by Ralph Tate on the "Bunda Plateau (north of Fowlers Bay towards Eucla" in 1879. The specific epithet (bursariifolia) means Bursaria-leaved.

== Distribution ==
This species of Scaevola occurs from Mount Ragged in the Cape Arid National Park in the Coolgardie, Esperance Plains, Hampton, Mallee and Murchison bioregions of Western Australia, to near Fowlers Bay in South Australia.

== Conservation status ==
Scaevola bursariifolia is listed as 'not threatened' by the Western Australian Government Department of Biodiversity, Conservation and Attractions.
