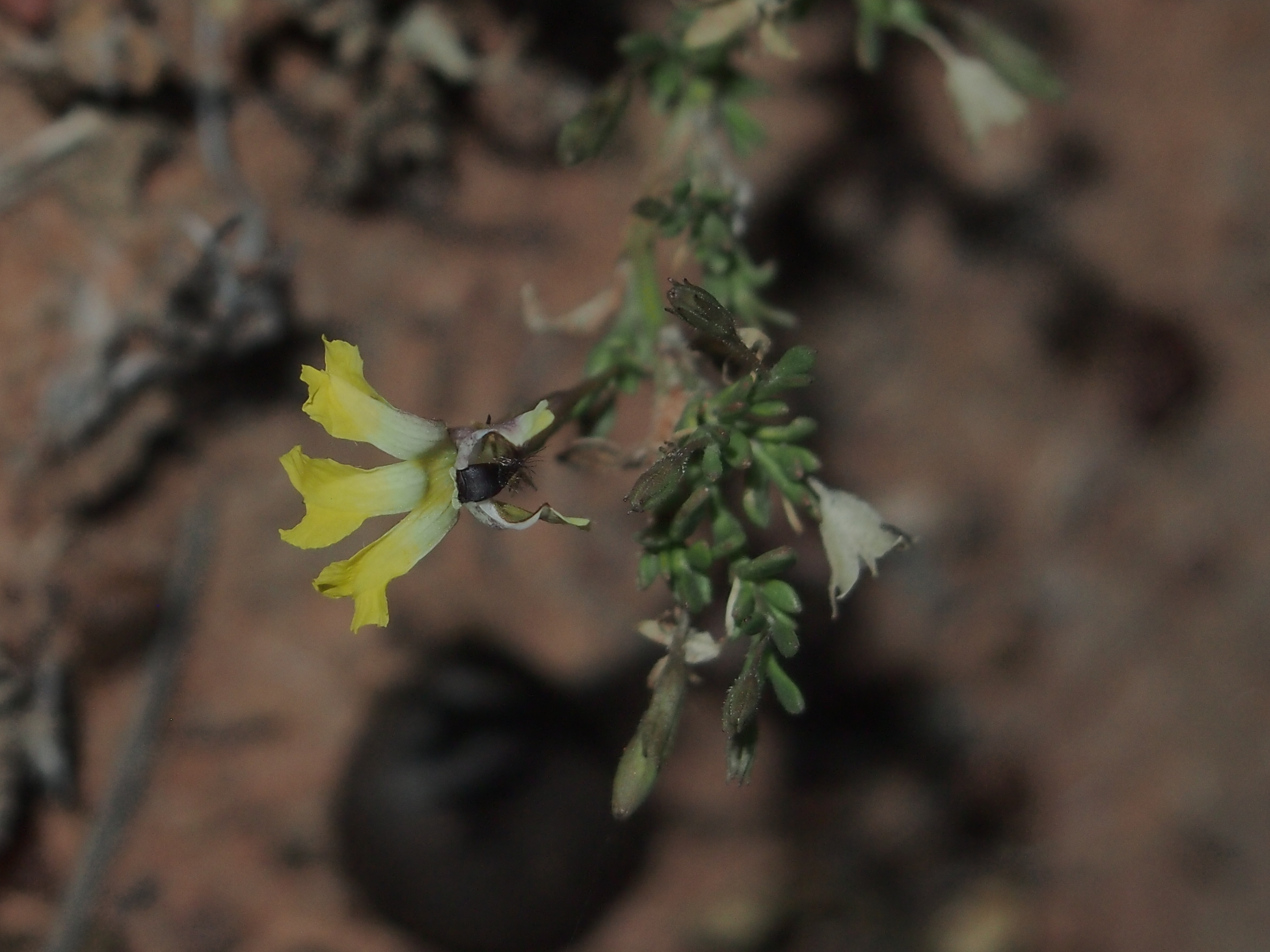

Conservation status
- Priority Three — Poorly Known Taxa (DEC)

Scientific classification
- Kingdom: Plantae
- Clade: Tracheophytes
- Clade: Angiosperms
- Clade: Eudicots
- Clade: Asterids
- Order: Asterales
- Family: Goodeniaceae
- Genus: Goodenia
- Species: G. modesta

Binomial name
- Goodenia modesta J.M.Black

= Goodenia modesta =

Species of plant

Goodenia modesta is a species of flowering plant in the family Goodeniaceae and is endemic to central Australia. It is an erect perennial herb with leaves lance-shaped in outline at the base of the plant, and racemes or thyrses of yellow flowers.

== Description ==
Goodenia modesta is an erect, perennial herb that typically grows to a height of up to 50 cm (20 in) long with stems that are round in cross-section. The leaves at the base of the plant are pinnatifid to lyrate, lance-shaped in outline with the narrower end towards the base, up to 80 mm (3.1 in) long and 20 mm (0.79 in) wide. Leaves on the stem are smaller. The flowers are arranged in racemes or thyrses up to 450 mm (18 in) long, with bracts 5–20 mm (0.20–0.79 in) long, each flower on a pedicel 3–5 mm (0.12–0.20 in) long. The sepals are linear to lance-shaped, 2–3 mm (0.079–0.118 in) long, the petals yellow and 12–14 mm (0.47–0.55 in) long. The lower lobes of the corolla are about 4 mm (0.16 in) long with wings about 1.5 mm (0.059 in) wide, the central lobe with a prominent dish or pocket. Flowering occurs in most months and the fruit is a more or less cylindrical capsule 4 mm (0.16 in) long.

== Taxonomy and naming ==
Goodenia modesta was described in 1912 by John McConnell Black in Transactions and Proceedings of the Royal Society of South Australia. The specific epithet (modesta) means "modest or unassuming".

== Distribution and habitat ==
This goodenia grows in red loam and sand with Acacia aneura and on hummock grassland in central Australia, in the states of Western Australia, the Northern Territory and South Australia.

== Conservation status ==
Goodenia modesta is classified as of "least concern" under the Northern Territory Government Territory Parks and Wildlife Conservation Act 1976 but as "Priority Three" by the Government of Western Australia Department of Parks and Wildlife meaning that it is poorly known and known from only a few locations but is not under imminent threat.
