= Junior Research Fellowships =

Oxbridge postdoctoral fellowship

University of Oxford
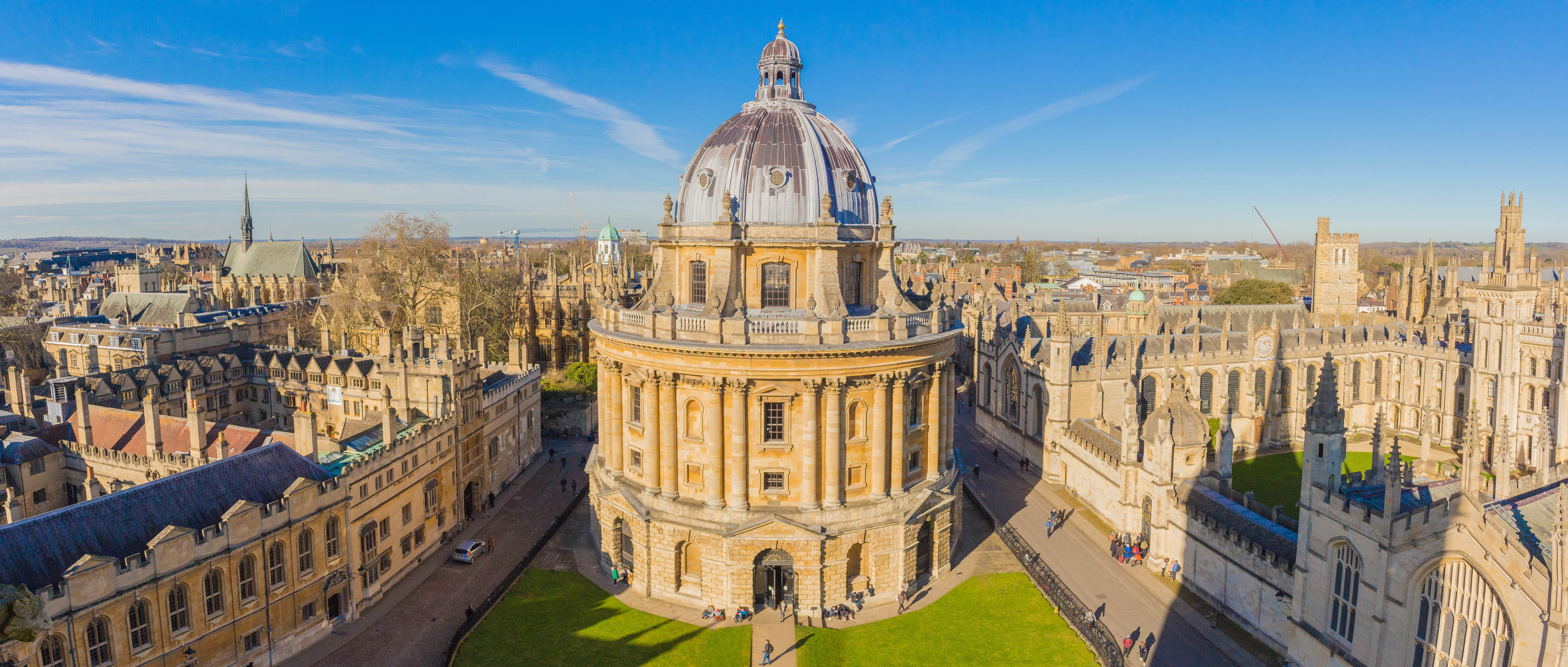
- The Bodleian Library
- Motto: Latin: Dominus illuminatio mea
- Type: Public research university
- Established: 1096
- Location: Oxford, England; 51°45′18″N 01°15′18″W

A Junior Research Fellowship (JRF), sometimes known as a Research Fellowship or Fellow by Examination, is a postdoctoral fellowship for early-career scholars and recent PhD/DPhil graduates at the University of Oxford and the University of Cambridge. JRFs are among the most highly competitive, prestigious postdoctoral fellowships in the United Kingdom. The fellowships are also seen as direct pathways to permanent academic positions.

== History ==
Initially, the term research fellow referred to a junior researcher, who worked on a specific project on a temporary basis. They tended to be paid either from central university funds or by an outside organisation such as a charity or company, or through an external grant-awarding body such as a research council or a royal society, for example in the Royal Society University Research Fellowship. They were often reserved for unmarried researchers, although this prohibition was lifted in the mid-nineteenth-century reforms.

During and after the First World War, Oxbridge colleges instituted more reforms to their research programs. The number of overall researchers at Oxford increased from 100 in 1909 to 1,071 in 1919. At Balliol College, Oxford, JRFs were allowed to sit on the college's governing body, which were responsible for central decision making.

In the postwar years, British universities began to invest more resources into junior research fellowships. Nearly half of JRF stipends come from the central university, rather than the individual colleges. New JRF appointments became part of the research career track, in contrast to the teaching career track.

== Benefits ==
Colleges may award junior research fellowships as the equivalent of post-doctoral research posts, lasting for three or four years. JRFs offer full funding, usually with additional privileges, such as free or subsidised housing and dining rights in college. Additional benefits include access to campus facilities, private gardens, and access to common rooms. They do not have any teaching or administrative requirements, although some JRFs allow students to sit on their college's governing body and teach undergraduate tutorials. Unlike other postdoctoral positions in the UK, JRFs are not tied to a specific project or department, and students as a result are allowed to pursue their own independent research projects. For this reason, they are often the most coveted postdoctoral positions in the UK.

JRF posts may be advertised as general or field-specific. They are available for postdoctoral researchers in the humanities, social sciences, natural sciences, and engineering.

JRFs are one type of postdoctoral fellowship at Oxbridge. Others include the British Academy Postdoctoral Fellowships, the Leverhulme Fellowships and the Marie Skłodowska-Curie Postdoctoral Fellowships. Postdoctoral associates (as opposed to postdoctoral fellows) are another type of post, which are tied to a specific research project and usually funded by an external agency. Generally, these fellowships are together referred to as early career fellowships.

== Elections ==
University of Cambridge
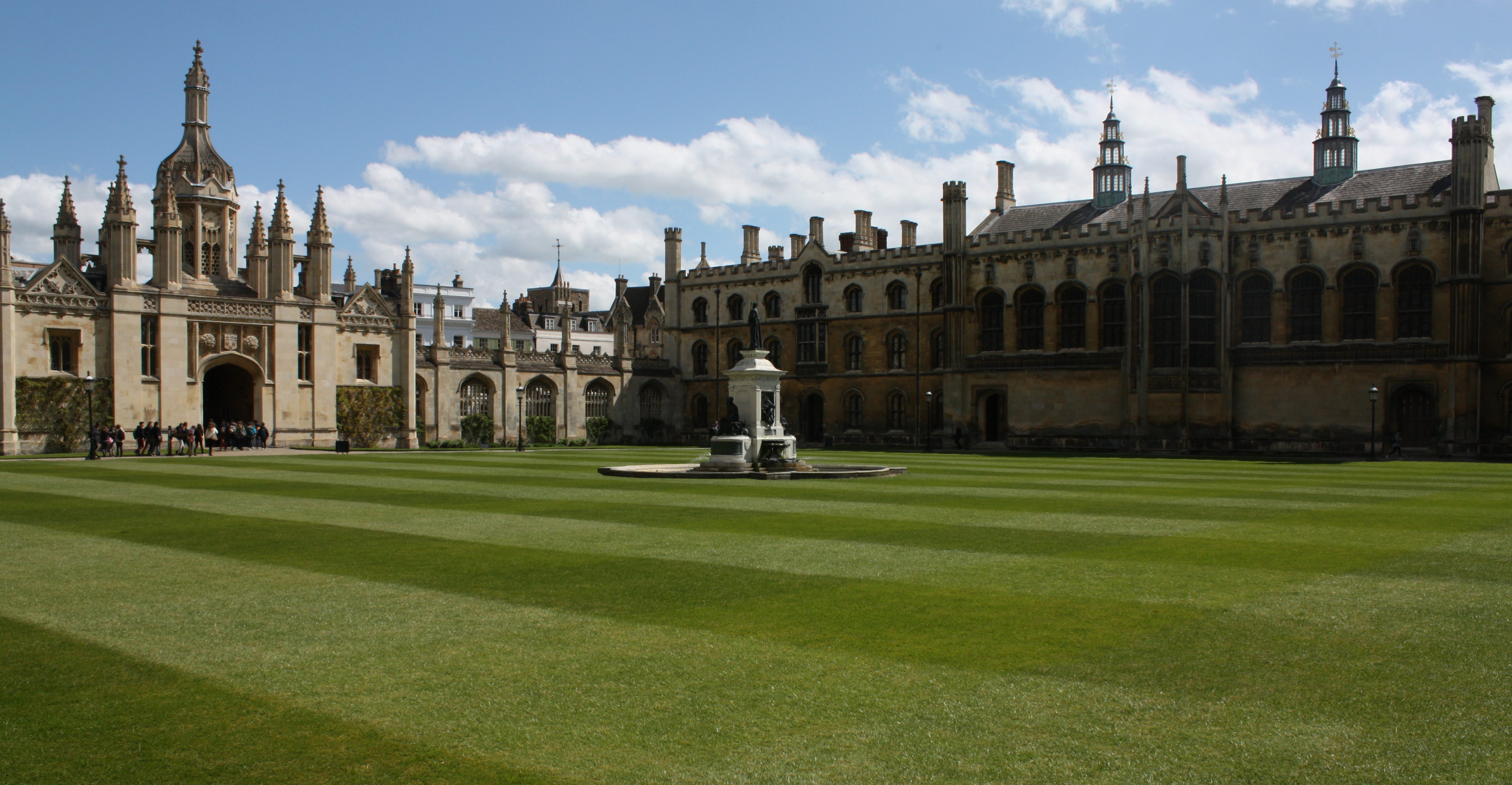
- King's College, Cambridge
- Motto: Latin: Hinc lucem et pocula sacra
- Type: Public research university
- Established: 1209
- Location: Cambridge, England

JRF selection committees prioritise applicants with high research potential and prepare them for permanent academic positions. They generally receive applications from final-year PhD students and recent graduates. Each Oxbridge college organises its own JRF advertisements, interviews, and offers. The application process requires preparing a package that may include a covering letter, a writing sample, recommendation letters and/or a curriculum vitae. Applicants who are long-listed are invited to submit other materials, such as additional writing samples, while those who are short-listed are invited to interview. JRF interviews are known for being notoriously difficult and intense. A single JRF job post may receive several hundred applicants.

Successful applicants are elected to serve as fellows with full college benefits. They are inducted in a ceremony to mark their admission as new fellows. The ceremony is conducted by a praelector who is a senior fellow of the college.

== Outside Oxbridge ==
In recent years other universities, including the University of Warwick and the University of Vienna, have created similar JRF positions. In continental Europe, JRFs are often tied to a specific project.

== Public perceptions ==
JRFs have been criticised for being exclusionary and discriminating against students who did not attend an Oxbridge college. Many have noted the class-based discrimination that occurs throughout the universities of Oxford and Cambridge. JRF holders are also described as being predominantly male, although some colleges have in recent years reported having a majority of female JRFs.

== See also ==
- Academic ranks in the United Kingdom
- Research fellow
