= J. G. Wood =

J. G. Wood may refer to:

- John George Wood (1827–1889), English writer on natural history
- Joseph Garnett Wood (1900–1959), Australian botanist

== See also ==
- Wood (surname)
