= Dittmann =

Dittmann is a German surname. Notable people with the surname include:

- Lorenz Dittmann (1928–2018), German art historian
- Marion Dittmann (born 1956), former East-German long track speed skater
- Mireille Dittmann (born 1974), former professional tennis player from Australia
- Sabine Dittmann, Australian-based marine biologist
- Sieghart Dittmann (born 1934), German chess player and epidemiologist
- Wilhelm Dittmann (1874–1954), German Social Democratic politician

== Fictional characters ==
- Arnold Dittmann, fictional character in the 1958 war film Darby's Rangers
