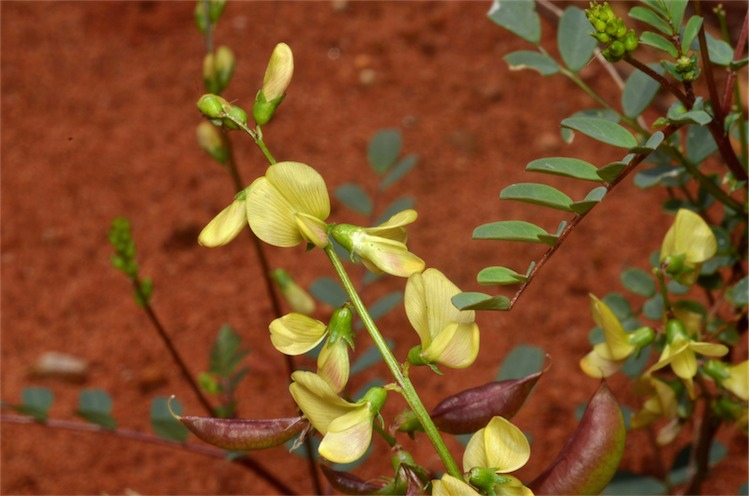
- In the Australian National Botanic Gardens

Scientific classification
- Kingdom: Plantae
- Clade: Tracheophytes
- Clade: Angiosperms
- Clade: Eudicots
- Clade: Rosids
- Order: Fabales
- Family: Fabaceae
- Subfamily: Faboideae
- Genus: Swainsona
- Species: S. laxa

Binomial name
- Swainsona laxa R.Br.

Synonyms
- Swainsona laxa var. ? rigida Benth.; Swainsona laxa R.Br. var. laxa; Swainsona rigida (Benth.) J.M.Black; Swainsonia laxa F.Muell. orth. var.

= Swainsona laxa =

Skeleton pea

Species of legume

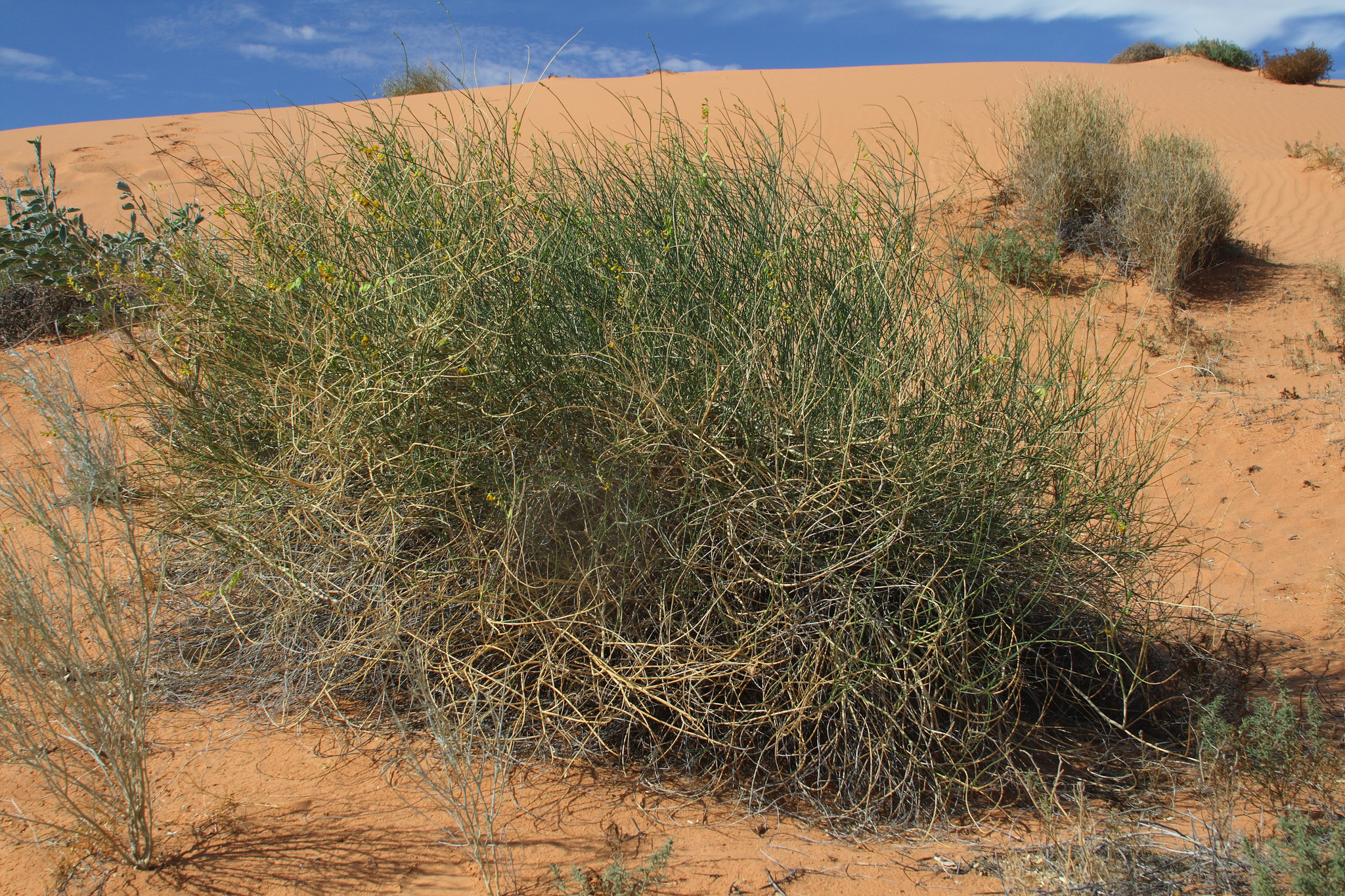
Habit

Swainsona laxa, the skeleton pea, yellow swainson-pea, yellow Darling pea, or sandhill swainsona, is a species of flowering plant in the family Fabaceae and is endemic to inland Australia. It is an erect, shrublike herb, often appearing leafless, sometimes with 13 to 17 broadly egg-shaped leaflets, and racemes of 15 to 20 usually yellow flowers.

== Description ==
Swainsona laxa is an erect or ascending shrublike herb that can grow to a height of 2 m (7 ft), and has mostly glabrous stems. Its leaves are imparipinnate, generally 50–150 mm (2–6 in) long, usually with 13 to 17 broadly egg-shaped leaflets, the lower leaflets 1–10 mm (0.04–0.39 in) long and up to 7 mm (0.3 in) wide with a notch at the tip. There is a stipule up to 2 mm (0.1 in) long at the base of the petiole. The flowers are arranged in racemes on a peduncle 120–200 mm (5–8 in) long with 12 to 20 flowers, each flower 10–15 mm (0.4–0.6 in) long on a pedicel 2–4 mm (0.1–0.2 in) long. The sepals are joined at the base, forming a tube about 1.5–2.5 mm (0.06–0.10 in) long with triangular teeth shorter than the sepal tube. The petals are yellow, sometimes with purple markings on the wings, the standard petal 10–15 mm (0.4–0.6 in) long, the wings 6–10 mm (0.2–0.4 in) long, and the keel 10–15 mm (0.4–0.6 in) long and about 4 mm (0.2 in) deep. Flowering probably occurs throughout the year, depending on rainfall, and the fruit is an inflated pod 15–20 mm (0.6–0.8 in) long on a stalk 1–2 mm (0.04–0.08 in) long, with the remains of the style about 3 mm (0.1 in) long.

== Taxonomy and naming ==
Swainsona laxa was first formally described in 1849 by Robert Brown in the botanical appendix of Charles Sturt's Narrative of an Expedition into Central Australia. The specific epithet (laxa) means "loose" or "open".

== Distribution and habitat ==
Skeleton pea grows on the upper slopes of sand ridges in western New South Wales, the north-west of South Australia, southern Northern Territory and Queensland.
