= Nelly Hooper Ludbrook =

Paleontologist and geologist

Nelly Hooper Ludbrook MBE (1907–1995) was an Australian geologist and palaeontologist.

Nelly Hooper Woods (better known as Nell Hooper Ludbrook) was born in Yorketown, South Australia on 14 June 1907. Her mother had studied as a teacher at the University of Adelaide in 1900. After attending Mount Barker High School, Nell enrolled in the University of Adelaide in 1926, taking her B.A. in 1928 and a teaching degree, as she had not studied enough prerequisite science subjects to enrol in a B.Sc.. She studied geology and mathematics, and appealed to Dr. C.T. Madigan for a research project in geology. She worked on the fossil mollusc collection of Sir Joseph Verco for many years and pursued her M.A.

== Career ==
While working as a teacher at Mount Barker High School, Nell wrote a paper on Cainozoic molluscs, which was rewarded with the Tate Memorial Medal from the University of Adelaide in 1931. Nell married Dr. Wallis Verco Ludbrook, whom she had met at the University of Adelaide where he was studying his B.Sc. and she her B.A., in 1935, and Nell and Wallis moved to Canberra. Irene Crespin, palaeontologist with the Commonwealth government, moved from Melbourne to Canberra, and employed Nell Ludbrook as an Assistant Geologist from 1942 to 1949, working on the statistics of minerals for the war effort for the Department of Mines.

In 1950, Ludbrook travelled to England to study molluscs at the Imperial College of Science at the British Museum (Natural History), while her husband was away for work. Wallis Ludbrook died in 1951, and Nell was encouraged by her husband's family to remain in England and take her PhD in Pliocene molluscs of the Adelaide plains, at the University of London. After graduation in 1952, Ludbrook returned to Australia and began work as a Technical Information Officer for the South Australian Department of Mines. She was promoted to palaeontologist in 1957 and later senior palaeontologist, continuing in this role until her retirement in 1967. She was the Australian correspondent to the journal, Micropalaeontology from 1962 to 1966.

Ludbrook worked as a consultant in palaeontology for the South Australian Department of Mines after her retirement, describing Tertiary molluscan fauna. She also wrote, Handbooks of the Flora and Fauna of South Australia and Guide to the Geology and Mineral Resources of South Australia.

Ludbrook died in 1995. She has been praised for the way that she showed that palaeontology could be useful to the resources industry. The P. ludbrookiae zone in the Eromanga and Surat basins is named in her honour.

== Awards and legacy ==
Seventeen fossil species were named after her including, Ludbrookia Chavan, 1951. She published over 70 scientific papers and monographs. She was appointed Member of the Order of the British Empire in the 1981 Birthday Honours for service to science.

The Geological Survey of South Australia named their fossil collection, the Ludbrook Library, within their geoscience laboratory in her honour.

Ludbrook was the first female President of the Geological Society of Australia in 1968. She was the first female president of the Royal Society of South Australia in 1961. She received the Sir Joseph Verco medal from them in 1963.
