= Constance Margaret Eardley =

Australian botanist (1910–1978)

- Born: 6 September 1910; Fullarton, South Australia
- Died: 15 May 1978 (aged 67); Fullarton, South Australia
- Other name: Con Eardley
- Education: University of Adelaide
- Scientific career
- Workplaces: University of Adelaide
- Author abbrev. (botany): Eardley

Constance Margaret Eardley (6 September 1910 – 15 May 1978) was an Australian systematic botanist, lecturer and curator. She was the first woman appointed to the Council of the Royal Society of South Australia.

== Early life and education ==
Constance Margaret Eardley was born in Fullarton, South Australia on 6 September 1910. Her mother was an historian and her father, Frederick William Eardley (1874–1958), was an accountant who served as registrar at the University of Adelaide. She completed her secondary education at Walford Anglican School for Girls, receiving honours in the leaving certificate. She was later president of its alumni association.

While studying for her undergraduate degree, Eardley was awarded the John Bagot Scholarship and Medal in 1928. She graduated from the University of Adelaide with a BSc in 1931 and received the Ernest Ayres Scholarship for her botanical work. Her honours thesis was titled "The Occurrence of Mycorrhiza [root fungus] in the Plants of South Australia" and was supervised by Joseph Garnett Wood. Her MSc, completed in the 1940s, was titled "Comparative studies of some Australian and extra-Australian floras from an ecological aspect".

== Career ==
Eardley worked at the Waite Agricultural Research Institute (now part of the University of Adelaide) as curator in the herbarium from 1933 to 1949. While there, her aim was to collect and identify all the native plants of South Australia. Her work also involved identifying plants and determining their toxicity to livestock. In 1943 she was appointed a lecturer in systematic botany at the University of Adelaide and was promoted to senior lecturer from 1966 to 1971. She served as editor of Australasian Herbarium News for several years from its inception in 1947. The journal was established to share the findings of the taxonomic researchers in Australia and New Zealand.

Eardley's research ranged from plants found in swamps and bogs to those in arid zones. She catalogued all the plants collected during the 1939 Simpson Desert Expedition led by Cecil Madigan.

She was a keep conservationist and wrote a pocket book of South Australian flora, all copies of which were destroyed in floods in Brisbane, with the aim of raising money for conservation work. She wrote Wildflowers of the Adelaide hills: A Field Guide in 1972.

In 1943 she was the first woman to be elected to the Council of the Royal Society of South Australia.

The standard author abbreviation Eardley is used to indicate this person as the author when citing a botanical name.

== Death and legacy ==
Eardley died on 15 May 1978 at Fullarton, South Australia. Following her death, the Constance Margaret Eardley Memorial Fund was established and an annual award was inaugurated for the undergraduate "student who achieves the highest aggregate marks in Level II courses in plant sciences in the Faculty of Sciences".

The Constance Eardley Reserve, situated on Quondong Station in South Australia, is named in her honour, as are the plants Atriplex eardleyae and Solanum eardleyae.
