= Ernest Andrews =

Ernest Andrews may refer to:

- Sir Ernest Andrews (politician) (1873–1961), New Zealand teacher, cricketer, and mayor of Christchurch
- Ernie Andrews (1927–2022), American jazz, blues, and pop singer
- Ernest Clayton Andrews (1870–1948), Australian geologist and botanist
