= Frank Leslie Stillwell =

Australian geologist

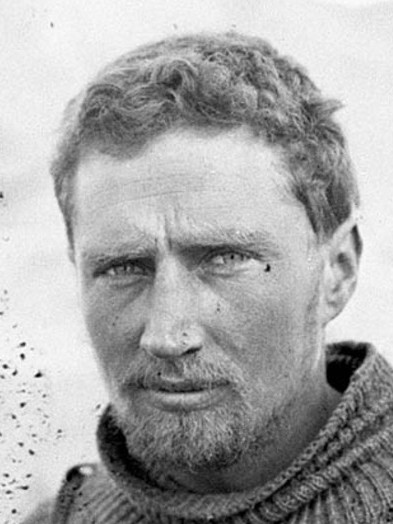
Frank Leslie Stillwell during the Australasian Antarctic Expedition.

Frank Leslie Stillwell OBE, (27 June 1888 – 8 February 1963) was an Australian geologist, winner of the David Syme Research Prize awarded by the University of Melbourne in 1919 and the Clarke Medal awarded by the Royal Society of New South Wales in 1951.

Stillwell was educated at the University of Melbourne and joined the Australasian Antarctic Expedition (1911–1914) as geologist. He spent 17 months in Antarctica under Douglas Mawson. He was stationed at the Main Base at Commonwealth Bay.

Stillwell then worked at Broken Hill, New South Wales 1919–1921, as assistant geologist under Dr. Ernest C. Andrews. He mapped the Kalgoorlie, Western Australia goldfield 1927–1928.

Stillwell joined the Royal Society of Victoria in 1910 and served as President from 1953 to 1954.

He also discovered and named the rare-earth boro-silicate mineral Stillwellite-(Ce).

Awards
Preceded by Ian Murray Mackerras	Clarke Medal; 1951	Succeeded by Joseph Garnett Wood
