= Swainsona reticulata =

Scientific classification
- Kingdom: Plantae
- Clade: Tracheophytes
- Clade: Angiosperms
- Clade: Eudicots
- Clade: Rosids
- Order: Fabales
- Family: Fabaceae
- Subfamily: Faboideae
- Genus: Swainsona
- Species: S. reticulata

Binomial name
- Swainsona reticulata J.M.Black

Synonyms
- Swainsona oroboides subsp. reticulata (J.M.Black) A.T.Lee; Swainsona reticulata J.M.Black isonym; Swainsona oroboides auct. non F.Muell. ex Benth.: Weber, J.Z.

Species of legume

Swainsona reticulata, commonly known as kneed Swainson-pea, is a species of flowering plant in the family Fabaceae and is endemic to south-eastern mainland Australia. It is a prostrate perennial herb, with imparipinnate leaves with 5 to 15 egg-shaped, elliptic or very narrowly linear leaflets, and racemes of 3 to 7 purple flowers.

== Description ==
Swainsona reticulata is a prostrate perennial herb up to 15 cm (5.9 in) high with many slender stems. The leaves are imparipinnate, mostly 10–70 mm (0.39–2.76 in) long with 5 to 15 egg-shaped leaflets with the narrower end towards the base, often elliptic or very narrowly linear, the side leaflets 3–15 mm (0.12–0.59 in) long and 1–3 mm (0.039–0.118 in) wide with broad, green stipules 2–7 mm (0.079–0.276 in) long at the base of the petioles. The flowers are purple, arranged in racemes of 3 to 7, on a peduncle about 0.5 mm (0.020 in) wide, each flower 5–10 mm (0.20–0.39 in) long on a densely hairy pedicel 2–5 mm (0.079–0.197 in) long. The sepals are joined at the base to form a tube about 2 mm (0.079 in) long, with teeth about the same length, or longer than the tube. The standard petal is 8–10 mm (0.31–0.39 in) long and 7–11 mm (0.28–0.43 in) wide, the wings 5–8 mm (0.20–0.31 in) long and the keel 6–8 mm (0.24–0.31 in) long and 2–3 mm (0.079–0.118 in) deep. Flowering occurs from August to October, and the fruit is a narrowly egg-shaped pod 13–22 mm (0.51–0.87 in) long and 4–5 mm (0.16–0.20 in) wide with the remains of the style 4–5 mm (0.16–0.20 in) long.

== Taxonomy and naming ==
Swainsona reticulata was first formally described in 1924 by John McConnell Black in the Flora of South Australia. The specific epithet (reticulata) means "reticulate".

== Distribution ==
Kneed Swainson-pea grows on alluvial flats in grassland or open forest along the Murray River valley, and is widespread on the western slopes and tablelands of New South Wales, extending into Queensland, Victoria and South Australia.

== Conservation status ==
Swainsona reticulata is listed as "endangered" in Victoria, under the Victorian Government Flora and Fauna Guarantee Act 1988.
