= Robert John Tillyard =

English–Australian entomologist and geologist (1881–1937)

Robert John Tillyard FRS
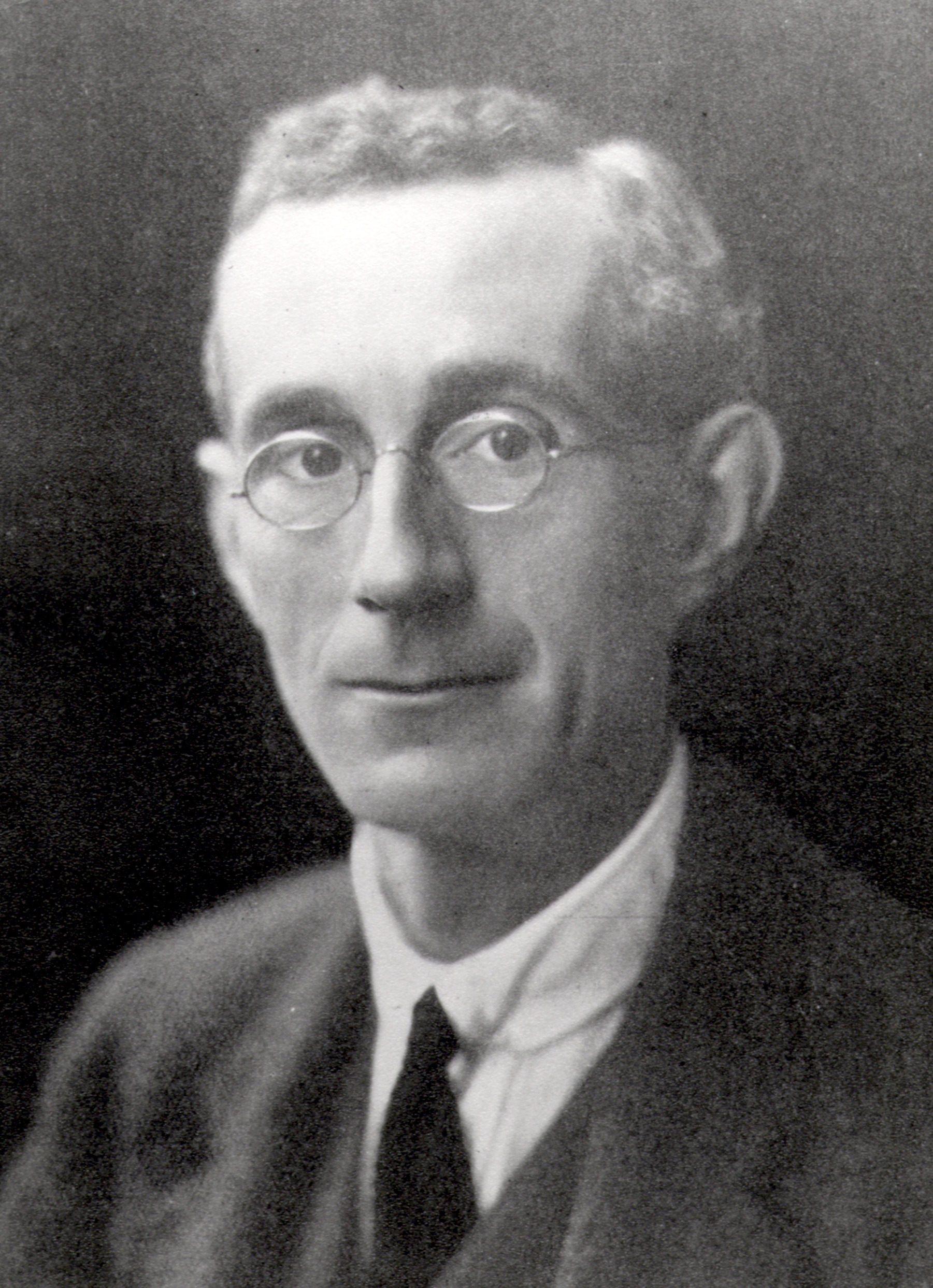
- Born: 31 January 1881; Norwich, England
- Died: 13 January 1937 (aged 55); Goulburn, Australia
- Education: Queens' College, Cambridge; University of Sydney
- Occupations: Entomologist and geologist
- Spouse: Patricia Craske (m. 1909)
- Children: 4 daughters
- Relatives: Lenox Hewitt (son-in-law)
- Awards: Clarke Medal (1931); Mueller Medal (1935)

Robert "Robin" John Tillyard FRS (31 January 1881 – 13 January 1937) was an English–Australian entomologist and geologist.

== Early life and education ==
Tillyard was the son of J. J. Tillyard and his wife Mary Ann Frances, née Wilson and was born at Norwich, Norfolk. While working as a science master Tillyard found time to publish extensively on dragonflies. After nine years with Sydney Grammar School, he resigned and undertook a research degree in biology at Sydney University in 1914.

== Career ==
This book became the standard work on Australasian entomology for some fifty years. He published widely and authoritatively on Odonata, Plecoptera, Neuroptera, and other orders, and on fossil insects, the wing venation of insects, and the phylogeny of insects.

In 1928, he became chief Commonwealth entomologist under the Commonwealth Scientific and Industrial Research Organisation. Rohan Rivett described those CSIRO years as follows:

In 1928 the CSIR sought a specialist to address insect damage to Australian agriculture and recruited R.J. Tillyard of the Cawthron Institute, whose work on insect taxonomy had earned international recognition. After protracted negotiations he moved to Canberra, addressed Parliament, and in March 1928 was appointed Chief of the Division of Entomology at a salary exceeding that of the other division chiefs. His tenure was marked by conflict with colleagues, and several staff considered resigning. In July 1933 Tillyard became seriously ill while in New York. A.J. Nicholson, who had already taken over much of the division's management, was appointed Chief of Economic Entomology after Tillyard's extended sick leave.'

Tillyard was killed following a car accident near Goulburn between Canberra and Sydney. The car was driven by his daughter, Hope, who was badly injured. The car had skidded and rolled over and he had hit the windscreen and broken his neck. He died at Goulburn Hospital.

== Psychical research ==
In the 1920s Tillyard became interested in psychical research. On his visits to England he worked with Harry Price at his National Laboratory of Psychical Research. He became vice-president of the laboratory in 1926.

In 1926 there was a minor controversy in the Nature journal amongst several writers. This was caused by Tillyard writing a predominantly supportive review of Arthur Conan Doyle's book The History of Spiritualism. Critics such as A. A. Campbell Swinton pointed to the evidence of fraud in mediumship and Doyle's nonscientific approach to the subject.

Tillyard had attended séances with the medium Mina Crandon in Boston. He managed to persuade Sir Richard Gregory the editor of Nature to publish his findings. In the 18 August 1928 issue of Nature in a paper entitled Evidence of Survival of a Human Personality he presented his observations on Crandon's séance phenomena and his belief in life after death.

== Publications ==
Entomology

- Mesozoic and Tertiary Insects of Queensland and New South Wales (1916)
- The Biology of Dragonflies: (Odonata or Paraneuroptera (1917)
- The Insects of Australia and New Zealand (1926)

Psychical Research

- Tillyard, Robert John (1926). "The History of Spiritualism". Nature. 118 (2961): 147–149. Bibcode:1926Natur.118..147T. doi:10.1038/118147a0. S2CID 4122097.
- Tillyard, Robert John (1928). "Normal and Supernormal Phenomena". Nature. 122 (3068): 229–231. Bibcode:1928Natur.122..229.. doi:10.1038/122229a0.
- Tillyard, Robert John (1928). "Evidence of Survival of a Human Personality". Nature. 122 (3068): 243–246. Bibcode:1928Natur.122..243T. doi:10.1038/122243a0. S2CID 28483085.

== Bibliography ==
- Serle, Percival (1949). "Tillyard, Robert John". Dictionary of Australian Biography. Sydney: Angus & Robertson.
- D. F. Waterhouse, K. R. Norris, 'Tillyard, Robin John (1881–1937)', Australian Dictionary of Biography, Volume 12, MUP, 1990, pp 232–233
- R. J. Tillyard, at windsofkansas.com

Awards
Preceded by Leonard Keith Ward	Clarke Medal; 1931	Succeeded by Frederick Chapman
