= Hugh Bryan Spencer Womersley =

Australian phycologist

- Born: 22 November 1922; Bristol, England
- Died: 16 January 2011 (aged 88); Adelaide, South Australia, Australia
- Occupation: phycologist
- Father: Herbert Womersley

Hugh Bryan Spencer (Bryan) Womersley (19 November 1922-16 January 2011) was an Australian botanist and phycologist. He was recognised internationally for his work on the macroalgae of the Australian region. He worked at the Department of Botany of the University of Adelaide. Womersley edited the exsiccata series Marine Algae of Southern Australia.

== Awards ==
- Edgeworth David Medal, awarded by the Royal Society of New South Wales (1955)
- Verco Medal, Royal Society of South Australia (1969)
- Fellow, Australian Academy of Science (1977)
- Clarke Medal, awarded by the Royal Society of New South Wales (1985)
- Mueller Medal by the Australian and New Zealand Association for the Advancement of Science in 1987
- Prescott Award, Phycological Society of America (1999)

== Standard author abbreviation ==
The standard author abbreviation Womersley is used to indicate this person as the author when citing a botanical name.

Awards
Preceded by Mike Archer	Clarke Medal; 1985	Succeeded by David Groves
