= Suzanne O'Reilly =

Australian geologist

Professor Suzanne O'Reilly AM FAA FRSN

Personal details
- Born: Suzanne Yvette O'Reilly; 3 February 1946 (age 80) Cootamundra, New South Wales, Australia
- Occupation: Geologist

Suzanne Yvette O'Reilly (born 3 February 1946) is an Australian professor of geology noted for her pioneering contributions to mapping the deep Earth with an interdisciplinary approach. In 2007, the Royal Society of New South Wales awarded her the Clarke Medal for outstanding contributions to Australian geology. She has over 350 peer-reviewed publications with over 40,000 citations (November 2022), and has supervised more than 40 PhD students to graduation.

== Early life and education ==
O'Reilly was born in Cootamundra, New South Wales. She went to high school in Goulburn, and was a Professor Harry Messel International Science School Scholar at the inaugural event for students held at the University of Sydney in 1962. She later attended the University of Sydney and graduated with a Bachelor of Science (first-class honours) in geology and general earth science. In 1971, O'Reilly earned her doctorate, also from the University of Sydney, for her thesis on basaltic rocks of the Southern Highlands (New South Wales).

== Current positions ==
O'Reilly is currently a Distinguished Professor in geology at Macquarie University in Sydney, Australia. O'Reilly has been the director of the ARC National Key Centre for Geochemical Evolution and Metallogeny of Continents (GEMOC) since 1995 and leader of the Lithosphere Mapping and Mantle Dynamics Group in GEMOC. She is also the director of ARC Centre of Excellence for Core to Crust Fluid Systems. She is concurrently professor of earth sciences at Nanjing University and a guest professor at China University of Geosciences (in Wuhan). In 2013, she was Copernicus Visiting Professor at the University of Ferrara. Lyon University awarded her a Docteur Honoris Causa.

== Research interests ==
O'Reilly's fields of research include:

- Integration of geophysical, geochemical, petrological, petrophysical and tectonic data to construct realistic lithospheric structure and evolution models (4-D lithosphere mapping]) and understand whole-mantle dynamics through time;
- Geochemistry and evolution of the mantle and deep crust;
- The geochemistry and origin of basaltic magmas and their geodynamic significance;
- Trace-element dispersions, residence sites and mineral partitioning in the mantle;
- Realistic geological interpretations of geophysical datasets;
- Relationships between mantle geochemistry and structure, volcanic activity, tectonic environment and lithosphere-scale controls for the distribution of economic deposits to enhance success in resource exploration.

== Selected awards and honours ==
- 1997: Invested as Concurrent Professor, Nanjing University
- 1989: Elected fellow of the Mineralogical Society of America
- 2000: Editors' citation award for excellence in reviewing for Journal of Geophysical Research (presented at the May Meeting of the American Geophysical Union)
- 2001: Awarded Centenary Medal for "service to Australian society and science in earth sciences"
- 2001–2003: ARC Expert Advisory Committee member for Physics, Chemistry, Geosciences
- 2002: Member of DEST Expert Advisory Committee for National Research Priorities
- 2002: Elected Fellow of the Australian Academy of Science
- 2002: Elected fellow of the Norwegian Academy of Science and Letters
- 2002: Member of the Australian Academy of Science National Committee for Earth Sciences from 2002
- 2003: Awarded Visiting Professorship, CNRS France
- 2007: Elected fellow of the Geological Society of Australia
- 2008: Awarded W.B. Clarke Medal by the Royal Society of New South Wales
- Editorial board member for Chemical Geology and Lithos, China-Russia Geotraverse Project
- Fellow of the Royal Society of New South Wales (FRSN)
- 2016: Member of the Order of Australia (AM)

== Personal ==
O'Reilly lives in Sydney, Australia.
