= Henry Coathupe Mais =

British-born Australian engineer (1827–1916)

Henry Coathupe Mais (14 May 1827 – 25 February 1916) was a British-born Australian engineer. He was engineer-in-chief to the Government of South Australia, and chairman of the Victorian Advisory Committee of the Institution of Civil Engineers for sixteen years.

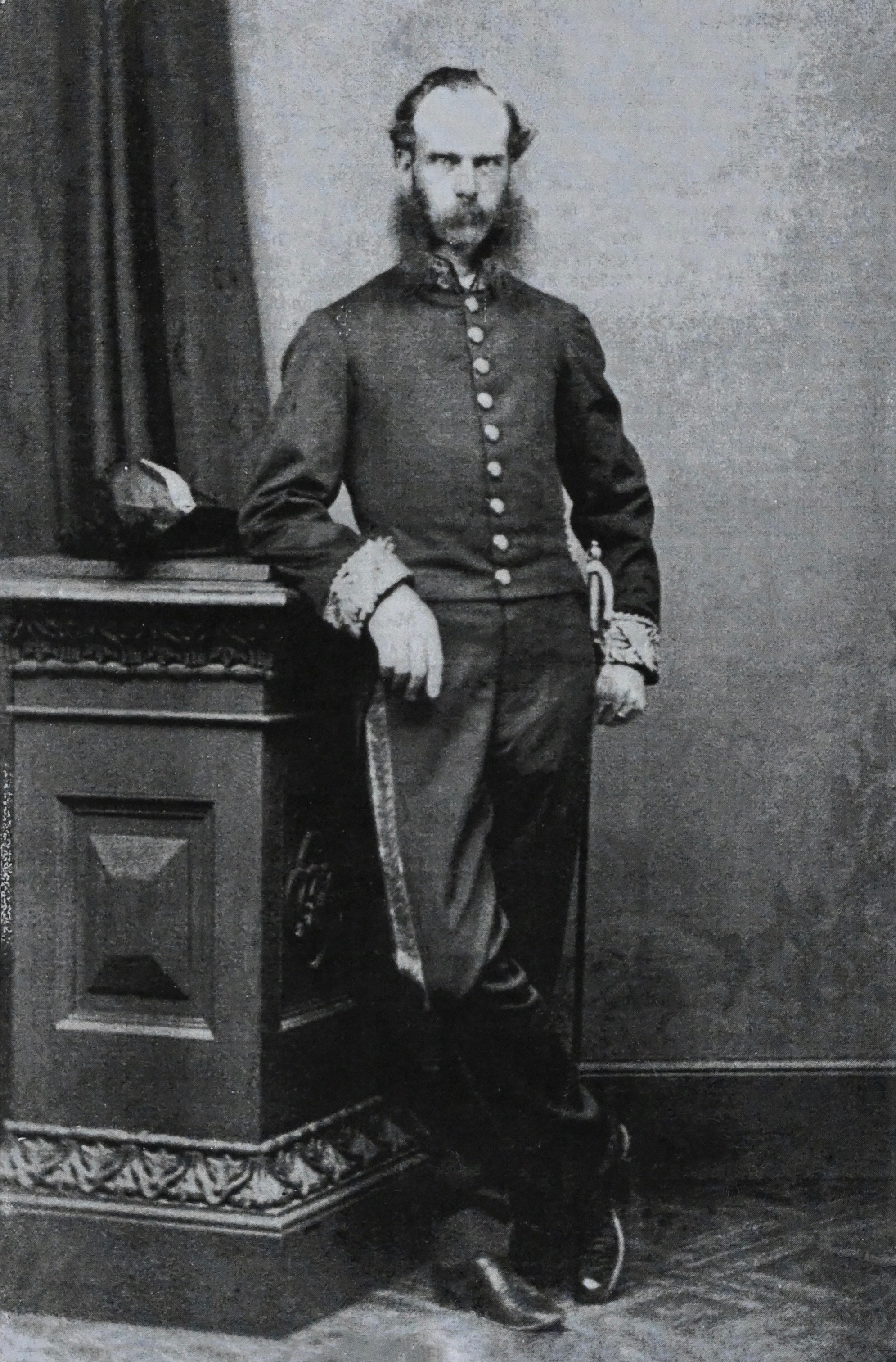
Henry Coathupe Mais

== Early life and education ==
Mais was born in Westbury on Trym, Bristol, England, the son of Henry Mais (1805–1888), engineer, and his wife Amelia Jane, née Coathupe (1803–1868). Mais junior was educated at Bishop's College, Bristol, and was articled for seven years to W. M. Peniston, one of Isambard Kingdom Brunel's chief engineers, working on English railways. At Birmingham, Mais made steam engines and superintended the building of locomotives at Swindon, in 1850 he worked on the Port of Hull docks.

== Emigration to and career in Australia ==
Mais migrated to Australia, intending to start an engineering business arriving in Sydney in December 1850. However, he found unsettled conditions and became acting engineer for the Sydney Railway Company. Later he worked as assistant engineer for City Commissioners' Department on the water and sewerage works. In January 1857 a select committee accused him of inexcusable errors and 'gross misconduct'.

Mais then went to Victoria and worked for the railway contractors Cornish & Bruce on the Sandhurst-Melbourne line. For three years he was engineer and general manager of the Melbourne and Suburban Railway Company, he won praise as a 'first class man in every sense of the word'. The Colonial Bank of Australasia awarded him £25 in December 1863 for his conduct of the Melbourne railway during the floods.

On 27 March 1867 Mais was appointed engineer-in-chief to the South Australian Government on a salary of £750. He was elected president of the Royal Society of South Australia in 1885. He resigned as engineer-in-chief in March 1888 after being accused of accepting private work and using government draftsmen on Silverton Tramway Company projects.

Mais then became a consulting engineer in Melbourne, was chairman of the Victorian Advisory Committee of the Institution of Civil Engineers for sixteen years. He was a member of the Institution of Civil Engineers (London), of the Society of Engineers UK, and the American Society of Civil Engineers. He died at his home in South Yarra, Victoria on 25 February 1916 and was survived by three sons and two daughters. He was buried in Kew Cemetery on 28 February 1916.
