= Irene Crespin =

Australian geologist and micropalaeontologist

Irene Crespin OBE
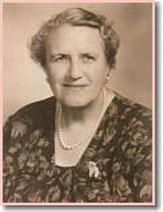
- Born: 12 November 1896; Kew, Victoria, Australia
- Died: 2 January 1980 (aged 83)
- Occupations: geologist, paleontologist

Irene Crespin OBE (12 November 1896 – 2 January 1980) was an Australian geologist and micropalaeontologist. Irene's interest in geology brought her attention to Frederick Chapman, who was a palaeontologist at the National Museum of Victoria. Irene became his assistant and later replaced his role as a palaeontologist in the Department of the Interior where she received half his salary, equipment and office space because she was a woman. Crespin began her research by examining and locating fossils across Australia.

== Early life ==
Geologist Irene Crespin was born in Australia in the Melbourne suburb of Kew. Crespin was born to Victorian parents, her father Godwin George Crespin an auctioneer and her mother was Eliza Jane. Originally, Crespin dreamed of becoming a musician, but after attending the Mansfield Agricultural High School she found her inspiration to become a geologist.

She took her B.A. from the University of Melbourne in 1919, in which she studied to become a teacher. Here, she fell under the influence of Frederick Chapman, whose assistant she became in December 1927. From here she assisted Chapman in his study and search to discover oils and minerals in the area.

== Career ==
On 1 January 1936 she succeeded Chapman as a palaeontologist in the Department of the Interior. It was a high honor to continue with Chapman's work, but unfortunately Crespin was severely underpaid: her salary was half that of Frederick Chapman, and had to continue on working with insufficient tools and lesser than desirable working environment. A driving desire to continue her geological studies resulted in Crespin moving to Canberra to be in contact with the Commonwealth's geological adviser Walter George Woolnough. During her career she published some ninety papers—including notable work on foraminifera—as sole author and more than twenty in collaboration with other scientists. In 1939, Crespin traveled to Java and Sumatra, Indonesia, to discuss with micro-palaenontologists who were in government service and industry, regarding the problems that existed with Tertiary correlation in the Indo-Pacific region. Crespin was invited to visit the US in 1951 to address the American Association of Petroleum Geologists and engage in a three-month tour, the first time an Australian had been asked to speak to this group. It was reported that opposition to her taking up this offer was strong from within the government. She was warmly welcomed by geologists across the United States.

A fire broke out in 1953 in the Canberra offices of the Bureau of Mineral Resources resulting in many of Crespin's books and work being destroyed. In 1961, Crespin had to retire at the age of 65.

== Later life ==
Crespin died in Canberra, on 2 January 1980.

She recorded some of her history of work within micropalaeontology in Australia, in Ramblings of a Micropalaeontologist, in 1975.

== Bibliographies of Australian Foraminifera ==
- The Sorrento Bore, Morington Peninsula, With a Description of New or Little Known Fossils. (1928) - Irene Crespin & Chapman, F.
- Rare Foraminifera From Deep Borings in the Victorian Tertiaries- Victoriella, Gen. Nov., Cycloclypeus Communis Martin, and Lepidocylina Burneensis Provale. (1930) - Irene Crespin & Chapman, F
- Rare Foraminifera From Deep Borings in the Victorian Tertiaries; Part II. (1930) - Irene Crespin & Chapman, F.
- Rare Foraminifera From Deep Borings; Part III. (1932) - Irene Crespin & Chapman, F.
- Arenaceous Forminfera From the Permian Rocks of New South Wales. (1940) - Irene Crespin & W. J. Parr
- The Genus Cycloclypeus in Victoria. (1941) - Irene Crespin
- The Genus Lepidocyclina in Victoria. (1934) - Irene Crespin
- Some Lower Cretaceous Forminfera From Bores in the Great Artesian Basin, Northern New South Wales. (1944) - Irene Crespin
- Some Permian Foraminifera From Victoria, Australia. (1945) - Irene Crespin
- Some Tertiary Foraminifera From Victoria, Australia. (1950) - Irene Crespin
- Two New Species of Lepidocyclina From Cape Range, North Western Australia. (1952) - Irene Crespin
- Lower Cretaceous Foraminifera From the Great Artesian Basin, Australia. (1953) - Irene Crespin

== Awards ==
- Crespin received he Bachelor of Arts (BA) in 1919 from the University of Melbourne.
- In 1953, Crespin received the Queen Elizabeth II Coronation Medal.
- In 1956, Crespin received the Royal Society of New South Wales Clarke Medal.
- Crespin was awarded the Clarke Medal by the Royal Society of New South Wales in 1957.
- In 1960, Crespin received her Doctor of Science (DSc) from the University of Melbourne.
- In 1962, Crespin received the Award of Merit from the Commonwealth Professional Officers' Association.
- In 1969, Crespin received the award of Officer of the Order of the British Empire (OBE).
- In 1973, Crespin received a career position - Honorary member of the Australian and New Zealand Association for the Advancement of Science.

== Legacy ==
A street in the Canberra suburb of Banks is named Crespin Place in her honour.

The Irene Crespin Prize for Palaeontology is awarded by the Faculty of Science at the Australian National University for excellence in undergraduate palaeontology.

Geoscience Australia in Canberra have named a room in Irene's honour. The Irene Crespin Innovation Lab was opened on 24 September 2019 with members of her family in attendance.

Awards
| Preceded by Oscar Werner Tiegs | Clarke Medal; 1957 | Succeeded by T. G. B. Osborn |
