= Walter Howchin =

English geologist (1845–1937)

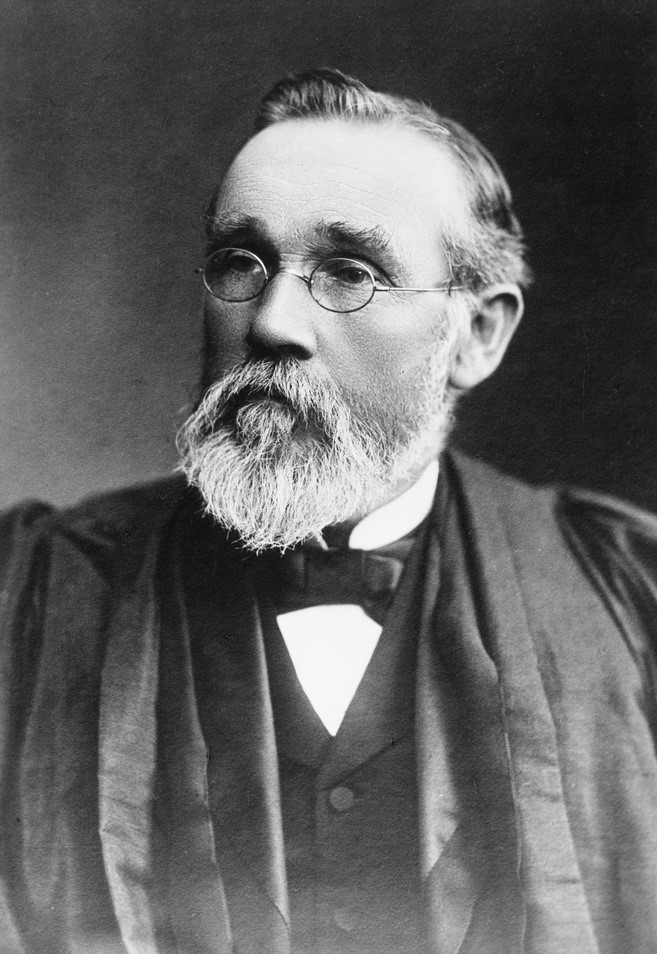
- Born: 12 January 1845
- Died: 27 November 1937 (aged 92)
- Awards: Clarke Medal (1907); Sir Joseph Verco Medal (1920)

Howchin at an outcrop south of Hallett Cove, c. 1920

Walter Howchin (12 January 1845 – 27 November 1937) was a geologist who lectured in mineralogy and palaeontology at the former Adelaide School of Mines and the University of Adelaide. He won the Clarke Medal in 1907.

== Early life and education ==
Walter Howchin was born on 12 January 1845 in Norwich, England, a son of Primitive Methodist minister Rev. Richard Howchin (1803–1874) and Mary Ann Ward, née Goose.

He was one of eleven children and attended the academy, King's Lynn, which he left aged 12 to study for the Methodist ministry. He was ordained towards the end of 1864. His first circuit was Shotley Bridge, Durham, and during the next 16 years he moved between a number of parishes in the Tyne valley.

== Career ==
=== England ===
He discovered abundant glacial till at Haltwhistle.

=== Australia ===
After contracting tuberculosis, Howchin emigrated to Australia in 1881. The change of climate helped his condition and he recovered fully.

Howchin retired in 1920.

Howchin went to study the geology of the Flinders Ranges with Douglas Mawson and Thomas Griffith Taylor in February 1906. Mawson's first work about South Australian geology was submitted to the Government of South Australia in March 1906, based on the work done in this trip.

Books written by Howchin remained in use as student textbooks for some decades.

For much of this later period of his life he was closely associated with another great Australian geologist of his era, Edgeworth David.

== Personal life ==
Howchin married Esther Gibbons (died 1924) in 1869, and they had two daughters, who survived him.

He was a prominent member of the Royal Society of South Australia and its offshoot the Field Naturalists Society.

== Death and legacy ==
Howchin died in Adelaide on 27 November 1937 aged 92.

The Walter Howchin Medal of the SA Division of the Geological Society of Australia is "awarded annually to a researcher in the early stage of their career that is distinguished by their significant published research work within the earth sciences in South Australia".

Awards
Preceded by Alfred William Howitt	Clarke Medal; 1907	Succeeded by Walter Roth
