= Clarke Medal =

Natural sciences award

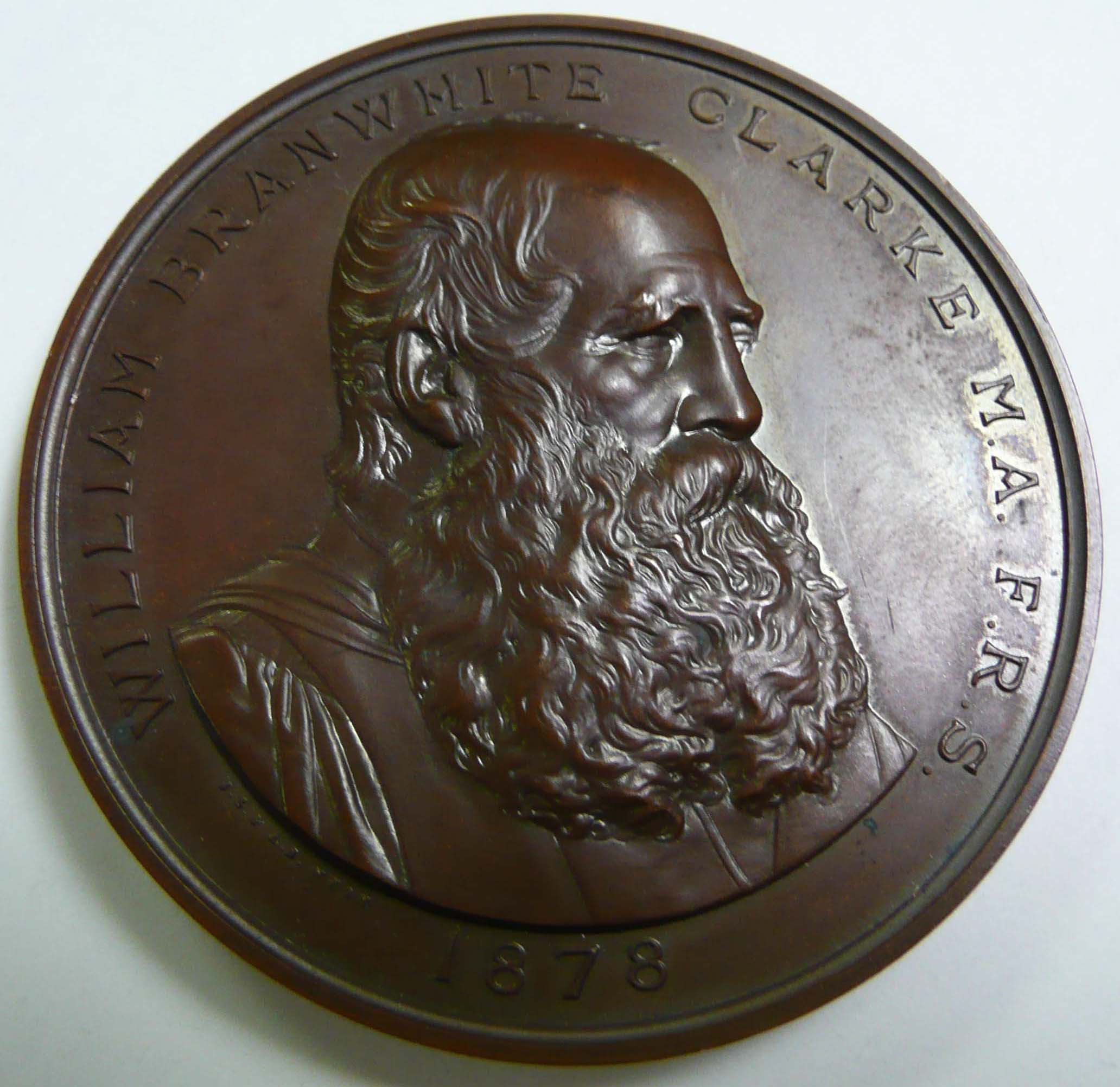
Clarke Medal

The Clarke Medal was awarded by the Royal Society of New South Wales, the oldest learned society in Australia and the Southern Hemisphere, for distinguished work in the Natural sciences.

The medal is named in honour of the Reverend William Branwhite Clarke, one of the founders of the Society and was to be "awarded for meritorious contributions to Geology, Mineralogy and Natural History of Australasia, to be open to men of science, whether resident in Australasia or elsewhere".

It is now awarded annually for distinguished work in the Natural Sciences (geology, botany and zoology) done in the Australian Commonwealth and its territories. Each discipline is considered in rotation every three years.

== Recipients ==
Source: Royal Society of New South Wales

- 1878: Richard Owen (Zoology)
- 1879: George Bentham (Botany)
- 1880: Thomas Huxley (Palaeontology)
- 1881: Frederick McCoy (Palaeontology)
- 1882: James Dwight Dana (Geology)
- 1883: Ferdinand von Mueller (Botany)
- 1884: Alfred Richard Cecil Selwyn (Geology)
- 1885: Joseph Dalton Hooker (Botany)
- 1886: Laurent-Guillaume de Koninck (Palaeontology)
- 1887: Sir James Hector (Geology)
- 1888: Julian Tenison Woods (Geology)
- 1889: Robert L. J. Ellery (Astronomy)
- 1890: George Bennett (Zoology)
- 1891: Frederick Hutton (Geology)
- 1892: William Turner Thiselton-Dyer (Botany)
- 1893: Ralph Tate (Botany and Geology)
- 1895: Joint Award: Robert Logan Jack (Geology) and Robert Etheridge, Jr. (Palaeontology)
- 1896: Augustus Gregory (Exploration)
- 1900: John Murray (Oceanography)
- 1901: Edward John Eyre (Exploration)
- 1902: Frederick Manson Bailey (Botany)
- 1903: Alfred William Howitt (Anthropology)
- 1907: Walter Howchin (Geology)
- 1909: Walter Roth (Anthropology)
- 1912: William Harper Twelvetrees (Geology)
- 1914: Arthur Smith Woodward (Palaeontology)
- 1915: William Aitcheson Haswell (Zoology)
- 1917: Edgeworth David (Geology)
- 1918: Leonard Rodway (Botany)
- 1920: Joseph Edmund Carne (Geology)
- 1921: Joseph James Fletcher (Biology)
- 1922: Richard Thomas Baker (Botany)
- 1923: Walter Baldwin Spencer (Anthropology)
- 1924: Joseph Maiden (Botany)
- 1925: Charles Hedley (Biology)
- 1927: Andrew Gibb Maitland (Geology)
- 1928: Ernest Clayton Andrews (Geology)
- 1929: Ernest Willington Skeats (Geology)
- 1930: Leonard Keith Ward (Geology)
- 1931: Robert John Tillyard (Entomology)
- 1932: Frederick Chapman (Palaeontology)
- 1933: Walter George Woolnough (Geology)
- 1934: Edward Sydney Simpson (Mineralogy)
- 1935: G. W. Card (Geology)
- 1936: Douglas Mawson (Geology)
- 1937: John Thomas Jutson (Geology)
- 1938: Henry Caselli Richards (Geology)
- 1939: Carl Süssmilch (Geology)
- 1941: Frederic Wood Jones (Zoology)
- 1942: William Rowan Browne (Geology)
- 1943: Walter Lawry Waterhouse (Botany)
- 1944: Wilfred Eade Agar (Zoology)
- 1945: Noel Benson (Geology)
- 1946: John McConnell Black (Botany)
- 1947: Hubert Lyman Clark (Zoology)
- 1948: Arthur Bache Walkom (Palaeobotany)
- 1949: Herman Rupp (Botany)
- 1950: Ian Murray Mackerras (Zoology)
- 1951: Frank Leslie Stillwell (Geology)
- 1952: Joseph Garnett Wood (Botany)
- 1953: Alexander John Nicholson (Entomology)
- 1954: Edward de Courcy Clarke (Geology)
- 1955: Rutherford Ness Robertson (Botany)
- 1956: Oscar Werner Tiegs (Zoology)
- 1957: Irene Crespin (Geology)
- 1958: Theodore G. B. Osborn (Botany)
- 1959: Tom Iredale (Zoology)
- 1960: Austin Burton Edwards (Geology)
- 1961: Charles Austin Gardner (Botany)
- 1962: Horace Waring (Zoology)
- 1963: Germaine A. Joplin (Geology)
- 1964: Joyce Winifred Vickery (Botany)
- 1965: Mabel Josephine Mackerras (Zoology)
- 1966: Dorothy Hill (Geology)
- 1967: Spencer Smith-White (Botany)
- 1968: Herbert G. Andrewartha (Zoology)
- 1969: Samuel Warren Carey (Geology)
- 1970: Gilbert Percy Whitley (Zoology)
- 1971: Nancy Tyson Burbidge (Botany)
- 1972: Haddon King (Geology)
- 1973: Marshall Hatch (Botany)
- 1974: Cecil Hugh Tyndale-Biscoe (Zoology)
- 1975: Joseph Newell Jennings (Geography)
- 1976: Lilian Ross Fraser
- 1977: Alec Trendall (Geology)
- 1978: D. T. Anderson
- 1979: Lawrence Alexander Sidney Johnson (Botany)
- 1981: William Stephenson (marine biologist)
- 1982: Noel Charles William Beadle (Botany)
- 1983: Keith Alan Waterhouse Crook (Geology)
- 1984: Mike Archer (Palaeontology)
- 1985: Hugh Bryan Spencer Womersley
- 1986: David Groves (Geology)
- 1987: Antony James Underwood
- 1988: Barry Garth Rolfe
- 1989: John Roberts (Geology)
- 1990: Barrie Gillean Molyneux Jamieson (Zoology)
- 1991: Shirley Winifred Jeffrey (Biology/Botany)
- 1992: Alfred Edward Ringwood (Geology)
- 1993: Gordon C. Grigg (Zoology)
- 1994: Joint award: Craig Anthony Atkins and Barbara Gillian Briggs (Botany)
- 1995: Christopher McAuley Powell (Geology)
- 1996: Klaus Rohde (Zoology)
- 1997: Charles Barry Osmond (Botany)
- 1998: Richard Limon Stanton (Geology)
- 1999: Richard Shine (Zoology)
- 2000: Sarah Elizabeth Smith (Agriculture)
- 2001: Gordon H. Packham (Geology)
- 2002: Robert Hill (Botany)
- 2003: Lesley Joy Rogers (Zoology)
- 2004: Ian Plimer (Geology)
- 2005: Mark Westoby (Botany)
- 2006: Anthony Hulbert (Zoology)
- 2007: Suzanne O'Reilly (Geology)
- 2008: Bradley Potts (Botany)
- 2009: Winston F. Ponder (Zoology)
- 2010: Kenton Campbell (Geology)
- 2011: Byron Lamont (Botany)
- 2012: Marilyn Renfree (Zoology)
- 2013: William Griffin (Geology)
- 2014: Robert F. Park (Botany)
- 2015: Christopher Dickman (Zoology)
- 2016: Simon P. Turner (Geology)
- 2017: David Keith (Botany)
- 2018: Emma Johnston (Zoology)
- 2019: Dietmar Müller (Geology)
- 2020: Michelle Leishman (Botany)
- 2021: John Aitken (Zoology)
- 2022: Andrew Baker (Geology)
- 2023: Moninya Roughan (Oceanography)

== See also ==
- List of biology awards
- List of geology awards
