= Ernest Willington Skeats =

English-Australian geologist and academic

Ernest Willington Skeats (1 November 1875 – 20 January 1953) was an English-Australian geologist and academic.

Skeats was born in Berais Town, Hampshire, England, son of Frank George Skeats, a bank clerk and his wife Alice Erena Martin and was educated at Handel and Hartley colleges, Southampton, and entered the Royal College of Science, London, where he received a D.Sc. in geology in 1902.

Skeats moved to Australia in 1904, succeeding John Walter Gregory in the chair of geology and mineralogy at the University of Melbourne. He specialised in petrology and stratigraphy.

Skeats was President of the Royal Society of Victoria 1910–1911.

He was elected president of the Australasian Institute of Mining and Metallurgy for 1925.

He won the Clarke Medal, awarded by the Royal Society of New South Wales in 1929.

In 1937 he was awarded the Mueller Medal by the Australian and New Zealand Association for the Advancement of Science.

Awards
Preceded by Ernest Clayton Andrews	Clarke Medal; 1929	Succeeded by Leonard Keith Ward
