= Helmut Wopfner =

Austrian geologist and academic (1924–2021)

Helmut (Heli) Wopfner (June 26, 1924 in Innsbruck – May 19, 2021) was an Austrian geologist and professor at the University of Cologne (Institute of Geology and Mineralogy).

== Life ==
After finishing high school, he was called up for military service at the end of 1941. Until the end of April 1945 he served as a pilot in the Luftwaffe. After being captured by the British in northern Germany, he spent 11 months in various prisoner-of-war camps in Belgium until his release in March 1946, when he enrolled in geology studies at the University of Innsbruck. After his marriage (1955), he and the family left Europe (April 1956) to take up an assignment with Santos in Adelaide under a four-year contract with Geosurveys of Australia Ltd. He was appointed to carry out oil exploration work in the company's licence areas in South Australia, Queensland, northwestern-New South Wales, and the Northern Territory. In 1956 he identified the first fold structures in the Oodnadatta region. This led to the discovery of new oil and gas deposits in the Eromanga Basin. In 1960 he joined the Geological Survey of South Australia and undertook the exploration of the geology of the northeast of South Australia and the Northern Territory. In January 1962 he was promoted to Chief Geologist.

In 1973 he took up a position at the University of Cologne. He continued working as a consultant for the Western Mining Corporation and returned to Australia every year until 1982. Prof. Wopfner's research at the University of Cologne focused on the economic potential, the tectonic-sedimentary facies and the palaeoclimatic development of Permian-Triassic depositional sequences of Gondwana and Gondwana-derived areas.

Wopfner died in 2021 at the age of 96. He was buried in Varena (Italy).

== Awards ==
- Distinguished Member of the Petroleum Exploration Society of Australia (PESA) (1973)
- Sir Joseph Verco Medal of the Royal Society of South Australia (September 1973)
- Honorary Correspondent of the Geological Society of Australia (2009)

== Selected works ==
Wopfner is the author of numerous publications on general geology and sedimentology.

- Helmut Wopfner: Geology of the Earth, Australia, Enke, Stuttgart, 1997, ISBN 978-3-432-26661-9
