= Walter Roth =

British colonial administrator, anthropologist and medical practitioner

Dr Walter E. Roth

Walter Edmund Roth (2 April 1861 – 5 April 1933) was a British colonial administrator, anthropologist and medical practitioner, who worked in Queensland, Australia and British Guiana between 1898 and 1928.

Roth and his brother, Henry Ling Roth, are the subject of a joint biography by Russell McDougall & Iain Davidson: The Roth Family, Anthropology, and Colonial Administration (2008).

== Queensland ==
Roth was appointed the first Northern Protector of Aboriginals in 1898 and was based in Cooktown, Queensland. From 1904 to 1906 he was Chief Protector and part of his duties was to record Aboriginal Australian cultures.

== Controversies ==
A "vigorous Protector" in North Queensland, according to historian Barrie Reynolds, "Roth attracted "the hostility of the local European residents" for his advocacy on behalf of Indigenous Australians.

It was, however, the reaction to his controversial anthropological research that would trigger Roth's departure from Queensland. In either 1900 or 1901, Roth paid an Aboriginal couple to demonstrate a sexual position of which he took photographs. In 1904 and 1905, speeches in the Queensland Parliament on this and other aspects of his work were said to form "a pile as high as the Eiffel Tower". According to V. B. (Joe) Lesina MP: "Hansard teemed with speeches delivered against the administration of Dr Roth until they had a pile as high as the Eiffel Tower, and the Minister brushed everything aside as he would a fly from his aristocratic nose". Roth attempted to defend his actions by stating that the photographs were taken for purely scientific purposes, Social Scientist Helen Pringle (School of Politics and International Relations) writes of the episode that in her opinion: "Forcing, or persuading, Aborigines to perform sexual acts like performing bears for a white male audience fits squarely even within then current criteria of enslavement, a heinous crime that shocks the conscience of mankind then and now." The controversy contributed to his resignation on the grounds of ill health and departure for British Guiana in 1906.

== Publications ==
- Roth, Walter E. (1897). Ethnological Studies Among the North-west-central Queensland Aborigines. Brisbane: E. Gregory, Government Printer.
- Roth, Walter E. (1901). The structure of the Koko-Yimidir language. Brisbane: E. Gregory, Government Printer. hdl:1959.9/506875.

Awards
Preceded by Walter Howchin	Clarke Medal; 1909	Succeeded by William Harper Twelvetrees
