= Leonard Keith Ward =

Australian geologist and public servant

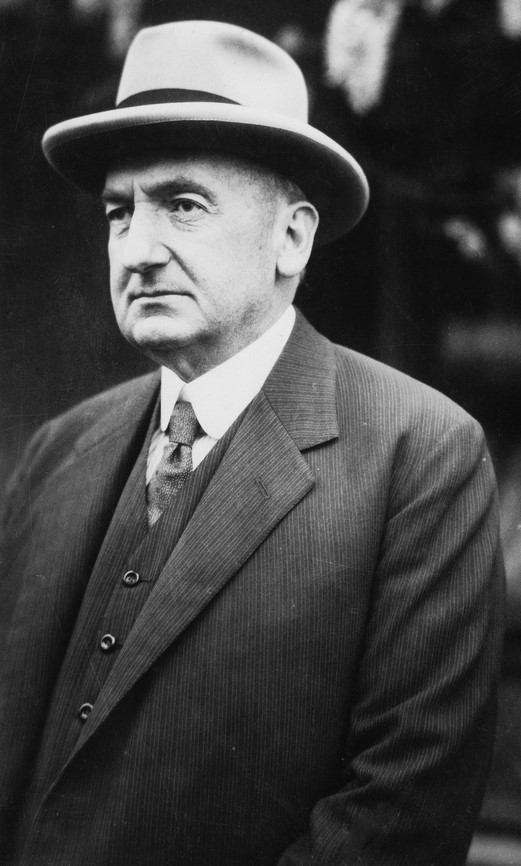

Leonard Keith Ward (17 February 1879 – 30 September 1964) was an Australian geologist and public servant.

Ward was born in Petersham, New South Wales and was educated at Sydney and Brisbane Grammar Schools then the University of Sydney (B.A., 1900; B.E., 1903) where he was taught by Edgeworth David.

Ward worked at BHP then at the Western Australian School of Mines, Kalgoorlie, from 1903. He played one first-class cricket match for Tasmania in 1907–08. In 1919 he became secretary to the minister of mines.

Ward was awarded the Clarke Medal by the Royal Society of New South Wales in 1930 and the Verco Medal by the Royal Society of South Australia in 1955.

== See also ==
- List of Tasmanian representative cricketers

Awards
Preceded by Ernest Willington Skeats	Clarke Medal; 1930	Succeeded by Robert John Tillyard
