= Walter George Woolnough =

Australian geologist

- Born: 15 January 1876; Brushgrove
- Died: 28 September 1958 (aged 82); Northbridge
- Occupation: Geologist
- Employer: University of Western Australia (1913–1919)
- Awards: Clarke Medal (1933)

Walter George Woolnough (15 January 1876 – 28 September 1958) was an Australian geologist.

Woolnough was born in Brushgrove, Grafton, New South Wales, and attended Sydney Boys High School (1888-1890), Newington College (1893–1894) and the University of Sydney. In 1897, as an undergraduate, he accompanied Edgeworth David's expedition to Funafuti Atoll, where Charles Darwin's theory of the formation of coral reefs was tested.

Walter George Woolnough was "temporary" adviser to the Commonwealth Government from 1927 to 1941. After visiting North American and Argentinian oilfields in 1930, he encouraged the use of aerial surveys and aerial photos in the search for oil, which he believed would be found in commercial quantities in Australia and New Guinea. In 1932 Woolnough recognised the dome-like structure of Rough Range, Exmouth Gulf, scene of an oil discovery in 1953. His papers on sedimentation in barred basins were influential in oil exploration circles.

A graduate of Sydney University, Woolnough accompanied Edgeworth David to Funafuti Atoll in 1897, and worked in Fiji in 1901 and 1905, recognising the essentially "continental" character of these islands. However his first visit there resulted in a legacy of recurrent thrombosis, which troubled throughout his career.

Woolnough lectured at Adelaide and Sydney Universities to 1911, and in that year he joined J.A. Gilruth's expedition to the Northern Territory, subsequently publishing an important bulletin on the Territory and a geological map of the northern portion, based on H.Y.L. Brown's earlier work, but with considerable additions by Woolnough.

He became foundation Professor of Geology at the University of Western Australia in 1913, remaining there until 1919. In Western Australia he made major studies of "duricrust", a term he coined and on other aspects of geomorphology. Woolnough then joined Brunner Mond Alkali company to seek economic salt deposits in Australia. He travelled widely, and despite the physical disabilities that barred him from a place on Scott's polar expedition in 1910, and from war service, he covered vast distances (1 000 miles on foot in seven weeks) in his work. He was not averse to using camel, bicycle, horse or car however.

Woolnough reviewed the then known iron ore occurrences of Australia for the Commonwealth, and because of the apparent limited supply an embargo (lasting until 1960) was placed on export of iron ore, a year before his retirement in 1941.

After retiring Woolnough carried out consulting for the next ten years, but turned increasingly to bibliographic and translating work, as his health deteriorated, and supported himself by translating scientific articles from more than a dozen languages. The first D.Sc. of Sydney University he was honoured by numerous other organisations. His name is commemorated in the Woolnough Lecture Theatre at UWA, Woolnough Hills, W.A., the Woolnough Geological Library at the University of New England and a sea-mount south east of Sydney.

Woolnough was one of the first group of honorary members elected by the Geological Society of Australia in 1957.

Woolnough was awarded the Clarke Medal by the Royal Society of New South Wales in 1933.

== See also ==
- Funafuti Expeditions

Awards
Preceded by Harold Curlewis	Schofield Scholarship; Dux of Newington College; 1894	Succeeded by George Harker
Preceded by Frederick Chapman	Clarke Medal; 1933	Succeeded by Edward Sydney Simpson
