= Sabine Dittmann =

Australian biologist

Sabine Dittmann is an Australian-based marine biologist and expert on the ecology of tidal flats. She is Associate Professor of Marine Biology at Flinders University in Adelaide, and is President of the Australian Marine Sciences Association. In 2019 she became President of the Royal Society of South Australia.

Dittmann's research focuses on the community of organisms living in soft sediments that make up the benthos. Using field experiments in tidal wetlands of temperate and tropical areas like the North Sea and Australia, she studies the roles of ecosystem engineers — such as mussel beds — and the impact on the ecosystem of human activities and invasive species.

Dittmann and her team conduct regular monitoring of South Australia's Coorong, assessing the availability of food for migratory waders and how benthic invertebrates respond to changes in the environment.

== Career ==
Dittmann studied at the University of Göttingen in Germany, where she earned her MSc (Diplom) in 1984 and her PhD in 1987, with a project on mussel bed communities and biodeposition.

After further study in marine ecology at the Woods Hole Oceanographic Institution, she undertook a three-year post-doctoral fellowship researching species interactions in tropical tidal flats, at the Australian Institute of Marine Science (AIMS) in Townsville, Australia.

Dittmann returned to Germany and for seven years led an interdisciplinary project studying the Wadden Sea ecosystem. She was also affiliated with the Centre for Tropical Marine Ecology in Bremen.

In 2001 she obtained her Habilitation, venia legendi for Ecology, from the University of Bremen.

She returned to Australia in 2004, joining the South Australian state branch of the Australian Marine Sciences Association (AMSA) when it re-formed in 2007. She joined the AMSA National Council in 2007, became Vice-President in 2010 and President in 2012.

Dittmann has been the Director of Flinders University's Lincoln Marine Science Centre in Port Lincoln since 2009. She is also a member of the South Australian Marine Park Council and the National Committee for Ecology, Evolution and Conservation of the Australian Academy of Science.

== Research highlights ==
Dittmann's research at AIMS in Queensland showed that soldier crabs, Mictyris longicarpus, prey on meiofauna, demonstrating an example of species interaction on tidal flats: "At that time, it was doubted by the scientific community that species interactions would play a role in benthic communities of tropical tidal flats, as extreme environmental conditions appeared to be the prevailing factor. Yet, no one had investigated any interactions there."

Her subsequent work with an interdisciplinary team examined living and non-living components of the ecosystem in the Wadden Sea — an extensive intertidal zone that stretches along the coast from the Netherlands to Denmark, taking in many German estuaries.

The team analysed the effect of both natural and experimentally induced disturbances, and how stability of the organisms depends on mechanisms like high functional diversity, reproductive output and mobility.

Dittmann's monitoring work in the Coorong, Lower Lakes and Murray Mouth also uses experimental disturbances, relocating benthic macroinvertebrates such as polychaete worms, amphipods and micro-bivalves to sites of different salinity and exposure. This study concluded that a reduction in salinity and increase in water levels is needed to recolonise mudflats.
