= Theodore Osborn =

British born Australian botanist (1887–1973)

Theodore George Bentley Osborn (2 October 1887 – 3 June 1973) was a botanist, ecologist and academic.

== Early life ==
Osborn was born at Great Clacton, Essex, England, son of John Ashton Osborn, a schoolmaster, and his wife Harriet Mary, née Andrew. Sometime later the family moved to Burnley, Lancashire where his father worked at the Grammar School. Osborn attended Burnley Grammar School and then from 1905 went to the Victoria University of Manchester on a scholarship, and won first-class honours in botany (B.Sc., 1908). He was elected to membership of the Manchester Literary and Philosophical Society on 29 October 1907.

== Career ==
In May 1912 he was appointed Professor of Botany, Vegetable Pathology, and Parasitology at the University of Adelaide in 1912, and both Osborn and his wife were admitted BSc ad eundum at the same ceremony.

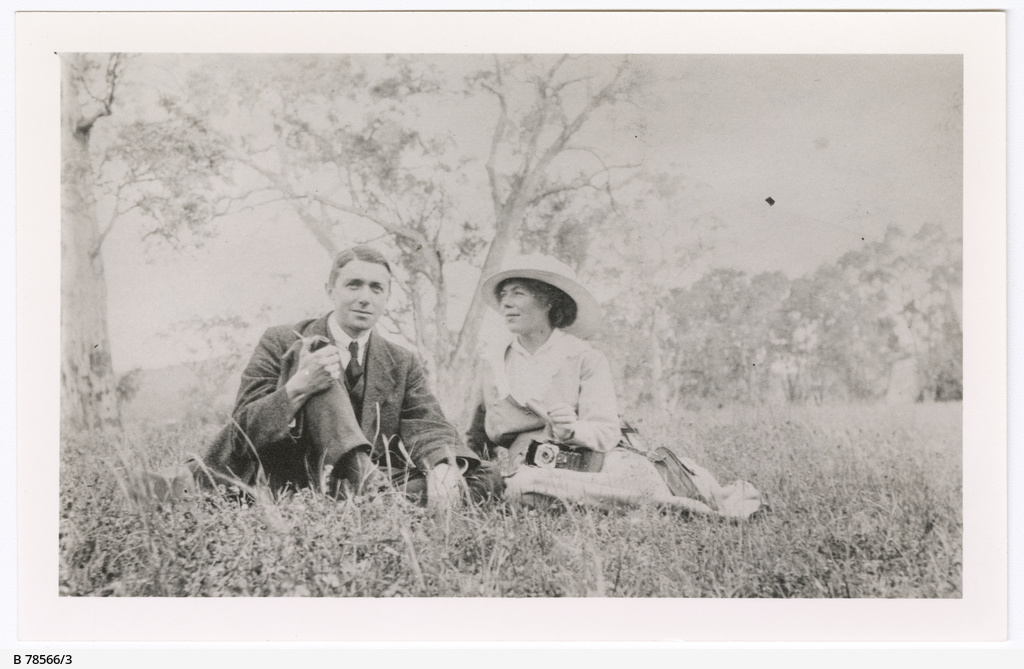
Professor T.G.B. Osborn, D.Sc., and Emily Osborn M.Sc. Botanising in the Belair National Park

In 1928 Osborn accepted the chair of botany at the University of Sydney; he studied the coastal vegetation of New South Wales. Osborn was dean of the faculty of science from 1930 to 1933 and a fellow of the university senate from 1931. In 1937 Osborn became Sherardian Professor of Botany at the University of Oxford, was elected fellow of Magdalen College and admitted to the degree of M.A.

On retiring in 1953, Osborn returned to Australia and lived mostly in Adelaide until his death.

In 1958, Osborn was awarded the Clarke Medal of the Royal Society of New South Wales.

Awards
Preceded by Irene Crespin	Clarke Medal; 1958	Succeeded by Tom Iredale
