= Royal Society (disambiguation) =

The Royal Society is a society for science in the United Kingdom.

Royal Society may also refer to:

== Organisations ==
=== Australia ===
- Royal Society of New South Wales
- Royal Society of Queensland
- Royal Society of South Australia
- Royal Society of Tasmania
- Royal Society of Victoria
- Royal Society of Western Australia

=== Other ===
- Royal Society of Canada
- Royal Society of New Zealand
- Royal Society of South Africa
- Royal Society of Thailand
- Royal Society of Edinburgh, Scotland, UK

== Other uses ==
- The Royal Society (album), an album by the Eighties Matchbox B-Line Disaster
- Royal Society Range, a mountain range in Antarctica

== See also ==
- List of Royal Societies
- Real Sociedad
