= Joseph Garnett Wood =

Australian professor of botany

Joseph Garnett Wood (2 September 1900 – 8 December 1959) was an Australian professor of botany and a president of the Royal Society of South Australia.

Wood was born in Adelaide, South Australia and educated at Unley High School, the South Australian School of Mines and Industries and the University of Adelaide, where he was awarded D.Sc. in 1933.

For much of Wood's career, his research was in the areas of stomatal physiology and the biochemistry of native plants under water stress.

Wood contributed reviews on the biochemistry of nitrogen and sulphur metabolism in pasture plants to three international journals: Chronica Botanica in 1942, Annual Review of Biochemistry in 1945 and Annual Review of Plant Physiology in 1953.

== Career highlights ==
- 1942 President of the Royal Society of South Australia (RSSA)
- 1944 (Sir Joseph) Verco Medal of the RSSA
- 1948-59 member of the (interim) council of the Australian National University, Canberra
- 1952 (W. B.) Clarke Medal of the Royal Society of New South Wales
- 1950-56, 1959 member of the CSIRO (Commonwealth Scientific and Industrial Research Organisation) advisory council
- 1952-59 member of the UNESCO (United Nations Educational, Scientific and Cultural Organization) advisory committee on arid-zone research
- 1954 elected Fellow of the Australian Academy of Science (F.A.A.)
- 1958 founding president of the Australian Society of Plant Physiologists.

Awards
| Preceded by Frank Leslie Stillwell | Clarke Medal; 1952 | Succeeded by Alexander John Nicholson |
