= Ernest Clayton Andrews =

Australian geologist and botanist

Ernest Clayton Andrews BA, FRS (18 October 1870 – 1 July 1948), commonly referred to as E. C. Andrews, was an Australian geologist and botanist.

== Early life and education ==
Andrews was born in Balmain, New South Wales, second child of noted artist Fearnleigh Leonard Montague, and his wife Alice Maud Montague, née Smith. At three years of age, he and his sister Marie Louisa Andrews (died 1952), were unofficially adopted by Wesleyan Methodist lay preacher and teacher John Andrews and his wife Mary Ann, née Bennett of Rockdale in the St George area of Sydney. Andrews, with other children, was educated by his adoptive father in a small schoolhouse behind the Wesleyan church on Bay Street, Rockdale, and from around age seven was expected to teach the smaller children. At age 16 he became a pupil-teacher at Hurstville, and qualified to enter the Sydney Teachers' College and study at the University of Sydney. In his second year he achieved first-class honours in Mathematics and Geology, and won Professor David's prize for geology; graduating (B.A., 1894) with second-class honours in mathematics. He was appointed teacher with the Department of Public Instruction, and taught for four years at Milltown, a suburb of Bathurst, where he was involved in competitive cycling and chess.

== Geology career ==
At the University, he was influenced by the professor of geology, Edgeworth David, who later chose him for geological expeditions to Fiji and Tonga. In 1898, while still teaching at Bathust, Andrews' first geological paper, The Geology of the Cow Flat District, near Bathurst was read in Sydney, by Prof. David, to the Australasian Association for the Advancement of Science. A few months later he embarked on Professor David's field trip to Fiji, intended to investigate some findings of the American Professor Alexander Agassiz. In 1901 with biologist Charles Hedley he examined the Queensland coast and Great Barrier Reef.

In July 1899 he was appointed geological surveyor with the Department of Mines and Agriculture, and around early 1909 Government Geologist.

In 1908, at the invitation of the eminent geologist Grove Karl Gilbert, Andrews went to the United States of America, where he hiked and climbed with Gilbert in the Californian Sierra Nevada range. Andrews made the first ascent of Mt. Darwin, elevation 13,837 feet, and its difficult summit pinnacle.

Andrews wrote three important papers on the theory of erosion, including Corrasion by gravity streams. Later he was taught field biology and published papers on Myrtaceae and Leguminosae.

He retired in 1930 to concentrate on research and writing.

== Recognition ==
Andrews was

- awarded the David Syme Research Prize medal by Melbourne University in 1915
- elected president of the Royal Society of New South Wales in 1921
- awarded the Clarke Medal by the Royal Society of New South Wales in 1928
- elected president of the Australasian Institute of Mining and Metallurgy in 1929
- awarded the Lyell Medal by the Geological Society of London in 1931
- elected president of the Linnean Society of New South Wales in 1937
- elected president of the Australian and New Zealand Association for the Advancement of Science (A.N.Z.A.A.S.) 1930–32. He presented the Mueller Medal in 1930 to Douglas Mawson.
- himself awarded the Mueller Medal by A.N.Z.A.A.S. in 1946 in recognition of his paper The origin of the flowering plants of the Pacific region

The Australian eucalypt Eucalyptus andrewsii was named for him

== Some publications ==
- Andrews, E. C.; Souter, D. H. (1905), An introduction to the physical geography of New South Wales, William Brooks & Co
- Andrews, E. C. (1939), The increasing purpose, Angus & Robertson
- Andrews, E. C. (1948), The eternal goodness, pub. E.C. Andrews
- Andrews, E. C. (23 February 1951). "Forbes Jubilee Celebrations; Discovery of Gold". The Forbes Advocate. Vol. 40, no. 16. NSW. p. 3 – via National Library of Australia.

== Personal ==
Andrews died at his home in Bondi, Sydney on 1 July 1948 and was cremated. He was survived by his second wife, Mabel Agnes (née Smith) and his unmarried sister, Mary Louisa Andrews.

Awards
Preceded by Andrew Gibb Maitland	Clarke Medal; 1928	Succeeded by Ernest Willington Skeats
