= Royal Society of South Australia =

South Australian scientific society

The Royal Society of South Australia (RSSA) is a learned society whose interest is in science, particularly, but not only, of South Australia. The major aim of the society is the promotion and diffusion of scientific knowledge, particularly in relation to natural sciences. The society was originally the Adelaide Philosophical Society, founded on 10 January 1853. The title "Royal" was granted by Queen Victoria in October 1880 and the society changed its name to its present name at this time. It was incorporated in 1883. It also operates under the banner Science South Australia.

== History ==
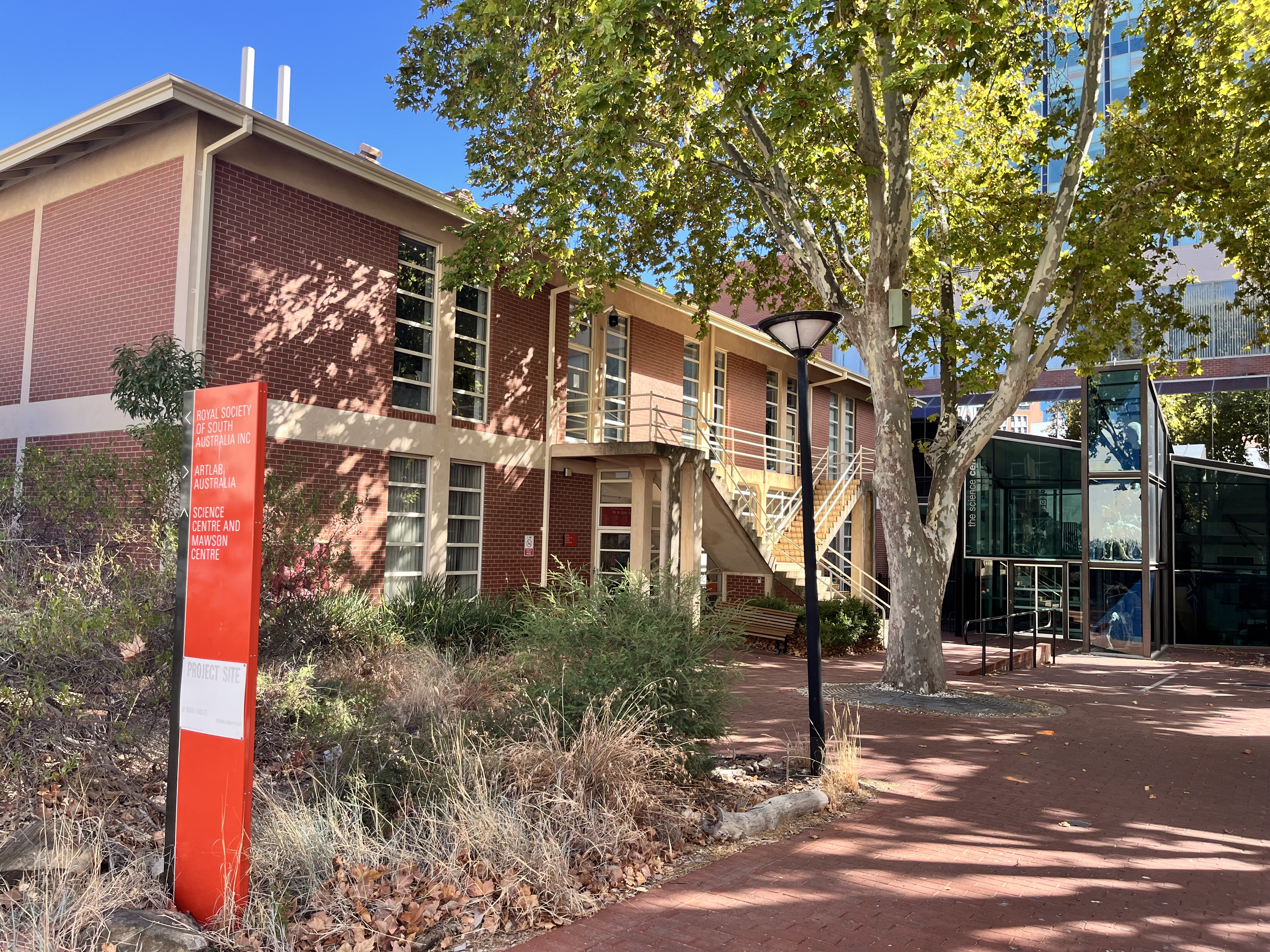
Royal Society of South Australia building on North Terrace, behind the SA Museum.

The origins of the Royal Society are related to the South Australian Literary and Scientific Association, founded in August 1834, before the colonisation of South Australia, and whose book collection eventually formed the kernel of the State Library of South Australia.

The Society had its origins in a meeting at the Stephens Place home of J. L. Young (founder of the Adelaide Educational Institution) on the evening of 10 January 1853. Members inducted to the new "Adelaide Philosophical Society" were Messrs. John Brown, John Howard Clark, Davy, Doswell, Charles Gregory Feinaigle, Gilbert, Gosse, Hamilton, D. Hammond, W. B. Hays, Jones, Kay, Mann, W. W. R. Whitridge, Williams, Wooldridge and John Lorenzo Young. J. Howard Clark was elected secretary. On 15 September rules were adopted and His Excellency the Governor Sir Henry Young was elected president, with Benjamin Herschel Babbage and Matthew Moorhouse as vice-presidents. T. D. Smeaton has also been credited with helping found the Society. Its aim was "the diffusion and advancement of the Arts and Sciences", and one of its earliest subjects of discussion was the formation of a museum showing the natural history of the Colony.

At the time of its first Annual General Meeting membership had risen to 35, and in 1859 the Society was incorporated under the South Australian Institute Act. The establishment of the University of Adelaide in 1875 revitalised the Society, which had flagged for some years before.

It received royal patronage, becoming the Royal Society of South Australia late in 1880, following the nomenclature used in other Australian colonies, and perhaps hoping to emulate their success.

The Field Naturalists Society of South Australia was formed as a section of the Society in 1883. In 1943 Constance Eardley became the first woman to be elected to the Council of the Society.

== Membership ==
There are five classes of members:

- Honorary Fellows
- Sustaining Fellows
- Fellows
- Associate Fellows
- Student Fellows

== Awards and medals ==
The society awards:

- The Verco Medal
- The Publication Medal
- The Royal Society of South Australia Postgraduate Student Prize
- The H. G. Andrewartha Medal

== Publications ==
The RSSA has published the journal Transactions of the Royal Society of South Australia since 1879, previously (from 1877–1878) Transactions and proceedings and report of the Philosophical Society of Adelaide. From 2004, the journal partnered with the South Australian Museum in the Southern Scientific Press, amalgamating their two journals. From 2005, the journal has been available in electronic form only, via Taylor & Francis Online.

In June 2020 an annotated list of 95 Australian bird fossils was published in the Transactions, the first such list since 1975, contributing to the documented knowledge of bird extinctions. The list includes three species of huge flamingos from the Kati Thanda-Lake Eyre and Lake Frome areas of South Australia, which were estimated to inhabit the area for 25 million years before becoming extinct about 140,000 years ago, most likely from drought. There were also penguins measuring about 2 metres (6 ft 7 in) tall, which lived between about 60 million and 30 million years ago, dying out in the Oligocene.

== List of presidents ==
Royal Society of South Australia presidents:

Term	Name
1853–1854	Sir Henry Young
1855	Benjamin Babbage
1856–1861	Sir Richard MacDonnell
1862–1868	Sir Dominick Daly
1869–1872	Sir James Fergusson
1877	Sir William Jervois
1878–1879	Ralph Tate
1880–1881	Sir Samuel Way
1882	Sir Charles Todd
1883	H. T. Whittell
1884	Sir Horace Lamb
1885	Henry Mais
1886–1889	Edward Rennie
1889	Sir Edward Stirling
1890–1891	Thomas Blackburn
1892–1894	Ralph Tate (2nd term)
1895–1896	Walter Howchin
1897–1899	William Lennox Cleland
1900–1903	Edward Rennie (2nd term)
1903–1921	Sir Joseph Verco
1921	Richard Sanders Rogers
1922–1924	Robert Henry Pulleine
1925	Sir Douglas Mawson
1926	Theodore Osborn
1927	Frederic Wood Jones
1927–1928	Sir John Cleland
1929–1930	Leonard Keith Ward
1931	Charles Fenner
1932	Thomas Harvey Johnston
1933	James Arthur Prescott
1934	John McConnell Black
1935	Thomas Draper Campbell
1936	Cecil Madigan
1937	Herbert Mathew Hale
1938	James Davidson
1939	Henry Fry
1940	Ralph W. Segnit
1941	Sir John Cleland (2nd term)
1942	Joseph Garnett Wood
1943	William Ternent Cooke
1944	Herbert Womersley
1945	Sir Douglas Mawson (2nd term)
1946	Clarence Sherwood Piper
1947	Hugh Christian Trumble
1948	Duncan Campbell Swan
1949	Norman Tindale
1950	Alfred William Kleeman
1951	Bernard Charles Cotton
1952	H. G. Andrewartha
1953	S. B. Dickinson
1954	John Kingsley Taylor
1955	R. V. Southcott
1956	C. G. Stephens
1957	I. M. Thomas
1958	Leslie Wedgwood (Lee) Parkin
1959–1960	T. R. N. Lothian
1961	R. V. Southcott (2nd term)
1962	Nelly Hooper Ludbrook
1963	J. T. Hutton
1964	Arthur Richard Alderman
1965	S.J. Edmonds
1966	Brian Daily
1967	Hugh Bryan Spencer Womersley
1968	K. R. Miles
1969	F. J. Mitchell
1970	C. B. Wells
1971	W. Grant Inglis
1972	Helmut Wopfner
1973	K. E. Lee
1974	G. F. Gross
1975	J. W. Holmes
1976	Charles Rowland Twidale
1977	Bruce Phillip Webb
1978	J. J. H. Szent-Ivany
1979	John Kynaston Ling
1980	Scoresby Shepherd
1981	Warren Bonython
1982–1983	D. W. P. Corbett
1984	John S. Womersley
1985–1986	Mike Tyler
1987	T. D. Scott
1988–1989	G. M. E. Mayo
1990–1992	N. A. Locket
1992–1994	William David (Bill) Williams
1994–1996	Margaret M. Davies
1996–1998	T. C. R. White
1998–2000	Martin Anthony Joseph Williams
2000–2002	Neville F. Alley
2002–2004	O. W. Wiebkin
2004–2006	Rob W. Fitzpatrick
2006–2008	Allan Pring
2008–2010	John T. Jennings
2010–2012	Nicholas J. Souter
2012–2014	Craig R. Williams
2014–2016	C. Michael Bull
2016–2019	John A. Long
2019–2024	Sabine Dittmann
2024–Present	Wayne Harvey

== Verco Medal ==
The Sir Joseph Verco Medal, also known as the Verco Medal, was established in 1928, with the first medal awarded in 1929. The medal is named in honour of Joseph Verco, who was president from 1903 to 1920.

"The medal shall be awarded for distinguished scientific work published by a Fellow of the Royal Society of South Australia. It is the highest honour that the Society can bestow on one of its Fellows. Only those who have made a significant, outstanding contribution to their field(s) of study receive the award."

Previous winners include:

Year	Name	Source
1966	Arthur Richard Alderman	
2004	Neville F. Alley	
1962	Herbert Andrewartha	
1996	Mike Archer	
2011	A. Austin	
2001	R. V. Baudinette	
1989	Ian Beveridge	
1991	A.F. Bird	
1930	John McConnell Black	
2003	John Bowie	
2017	Corey Bradshaw	
1994	P.F. Brownell	
2009	M. Bull	
1933	John Burton Cleland	
2013	Alan Cooper	
2015	D. Day	
1992	Patrick De Deckker	
1982	S. J. Edmonds	
1960	Hedley Herbert Finlayson	
1999	Rob Fitzpatrick	
1970	Martin Glaessner	
1979	G. F. Gross	
1946	Herbert Mathew Hale	
1978	J. W. Holmes	
1929	Walter Howchin	
1976	J. T. Hutton	
1986	W. Grant Inglis	
1987	R. K. Johns	
1935	Thomas Harvey Johnston	
1990	R. T. Lange	
1985	K. E. Lee	
2018	Mike Lee	
2014	John A. Long	
1963	Nelly Hooper Ludbrook	
1945	Cecil Madigan	
1931	Douglas Mawson	
2012	Brian McGowran	
1971	Charles P. Mountford	
1983	K. H. Northcote	
1972	Leslie Wedgwood (Lee) Parkin	
1995	P. A. Parsons	
1957	Clarence Sherwood Piper	
1998	W. V. Preiss	
1938	James Arthur Prescott	
2002	J. R. Prescott	
2005	Allan Pring	
1967	L. D. Pryor	
1981	Rupert William Roye Rutland	
2008	Scoresby Shepherd	
2010	Mike Smith	
1965	R. V. Southcott	
1961	R. L. Specht	
1968	Reg Sprigg	
1959	C.G. Stephens	
1974	P. M. Thomas	
1975	B. P. Thomson	
1956	Norman Tindale	
1977	Charles Rowland Twidale	
1980	Michael J. Tyler	
1955	Leonard Keith Ward	
1993	G. F. Watson	
2025	Chris H.S. Watts	
2000	Tom White	
2007	Martin Anthony Joseph Williams	
1988	William David (Bill) Williams	
1997	Joseph Tony Wiskitch	
1943	Herbert Womersley	
1969	Hugh Bryan Spencer Womersley	
1944	Joseph Garnett Wood	
1973	Helmut Wopfner	
1932	not awarded	
1934	not awarded	
1936–1937	not awarded	
1939–1942	not awarded	
1947–1954	not awarded	
1958	not awarded	
1964	not awarded	
1984	not awarded	
2006	not awarded	
2016	not awarded	
2019–2024	not awarded	
2025	Jim Gehling	

== Notable members ==
Notable members of the Royal Society of South Australia have included:

- William Henry Bragg
- Sir Robert William Chapman
- Thomas Charles Cloud (died 1918)
- Alexander William Dobbie (born 1843)
- John William Hall Hullett (born 1847)
- Cecil Thomas Madigan (1889–1947)
- James McGeorge
- Thomas Parker
- Thorburn Brailsford Robertson (1884–1930)
- Walter Rutt (1842–1925)
- Ralph Tate
- Sir Charles Todd
- Carl Albert Unbehaun (1851–1924)
- Robert Archibald White

== See also ==
- Australian Academy of Science
- Australian and New Zealand Association for the Advancement of Science
- Federation of Australian Scientific and Technological Societies
- Royal Society of New South Wales
- Royal Society of Queensland
- Royal Society of Tasmania
- Royal Society of Victoria
- Royal Society of Western Australia
- The Royal Society (The Royal Society of London for Improving Natural Knowledge)
- Royal Society (disambiguation)
