= John McConnell Black =

Scottish botanist

John McConnell Black MBE
- Born: 28 April 1855; Wigtown, Wigtownshire, Scotland
- Died: 2 December 1951 (aged 96); North Adelaide, South Australia
- Resting place: Magill Cemetery
- Spouse: Alice Denford
- Parent(s): George Couper Black (1819–1863) and Ellen nee Barham (1822–1902)
- Relatives: Richard D'Oyly Carte & Stanley Boulter (brothers in law), husbands of Helen Carte (sister)
- Awards: Verco Medal (1930); Mueller Medal (1932); Clarke Medal (1946)

John McConnell Black (28 April 1855 – 2 December 1951) was a Scottish botanist who emigrated to Australia in 1877 and eventually documented and illustrated thousands of flora in South Australia in the early 20th century. His publications assisted many botanists and scientists in the decades that followed. He was the younger brother of theatre and hotel manager Helen Carte.

Black was born at Wigtown, Scotland and educated at Wigtown Grammar School, the Edinburgh Academy, the College School, Taunton and a commercial trade school in Dresden, Germany. He was a linguist, able to understand Arabic, French, German, Italian, Russian and Spanish. He migrated to Australia in 1877 and developed an interest in Australian Aboriginal languages. In 1879 Black married Alice Denford and they had a daughter and three sons. He began working as a journalist in 1883. After a tour of South America and Europe following his mother's death in 1903, Black focused on systematic botany. In 1909 he published The Naturalised Flora of South Australia. His The Flora of South Australia was published in four parts during 1922 to 1929, and described 2,430 species, both indigenous and naturalized. It was indispensable to botanists and to those concerned with the vegetation of the arid regions of contiguous States. He began a revised edition of his book in 1939 and worked steadily for twelve years, publishing part 1 in 1943 and part 2 in 1948. Part 3 was nearing completion at his death.

J. M. Black received the following distinctions for his botanical work:- 1927, Honorary Lecturer in Systematic Botany at the University of Adelaide; 1930, Associate honoris causa of the Linnean Society of London; 1930, Verco Medal of the Royal Society of South Australia; 1932 Mueller Medal of the Australian and New Zealand Association for the Advancement of Science; 1933–34, President of the Royal Society of South Australia; in 1942, the M.B.E.; 1945, Australian Natural History Medallion (Field Naturalists' Club of Victoria); and in 1946 the Clarke Medal by the Royal Society of New South Wales. He died at his home in North Adelaide, and was buried at the Magill Cemetery.

Awards
Preceded by Noel Benson	Clarke Medal; 1946	Succeeded by Hubert Lyman Clark
