= Australian and New Zealand Association for the Advancement of Science =

Australian and New Zealand organisation to promote science

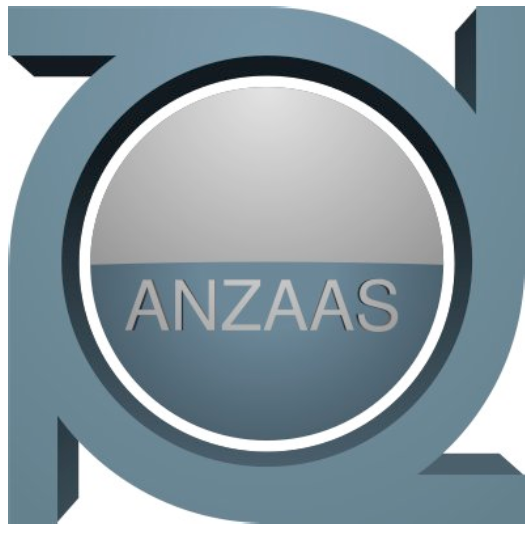

The Australian and New Zealand Association for the Advancement of Science (ANZAAS) is an organisation that was founded in 1888 as the Australasian Association for the Advancement of Science to promote science. It awarded the Mueller Medal from 1904 until 2006, and continues to award the ANZAAS Medal, which it has awarded since 1965.

== History ==
The Australasian Association for the Advancement of Science was modelled on the British Association for the Advancement of Science. For many years, its annual meetings were a popular and influential way of promoting science in Australia and New Zealand.

Founders of the association in 1887-1888 include Archibald Liversidge and Horatio George Anthony Wright.

It held lectures for the medals and for other named lectures, both nationally and at state level.

It changed its name to Australian and New Zealand Association for the Advancement of Science (ANZAAS) in 1930.

In the 1990s, membership and attendance at the annual meetings decreased as specialised scientific societies increased in popularity. Proposals to close the association were discussed, but it continued after closing its office in Adelaide.

== Today ==
The Australian and New Zealand Association for the Advancement of Science now operates on a smaller scale. The annual meetings are no longer held.

Each year it organises Youth ANZAAS, an annual residential scientific forum attended by senior secondary students from Australian and New Zealand high schools.

== Awards ==
The Association has awarded two important medals; the Mueller medal, named in honour of Ferdinand von Mueller, botanist and pioneer environmentalist, and the ANZAAS medal.

=== Mueller Medal ===
The Mueller Medal was awarded annually to a scientist who is the author of important contributions to anthropological, botanical, geological or zoological science, preferably with special reference to Australia. It is named after Ferdinand von Mueller, the German/Australian botanist who was Director of the Royal Botanic Gardens, Melbourne. Initiated in 1902, it was designed by Walter Baldwin Spencer. It was last awarded in 2006.

==== Recipients ====
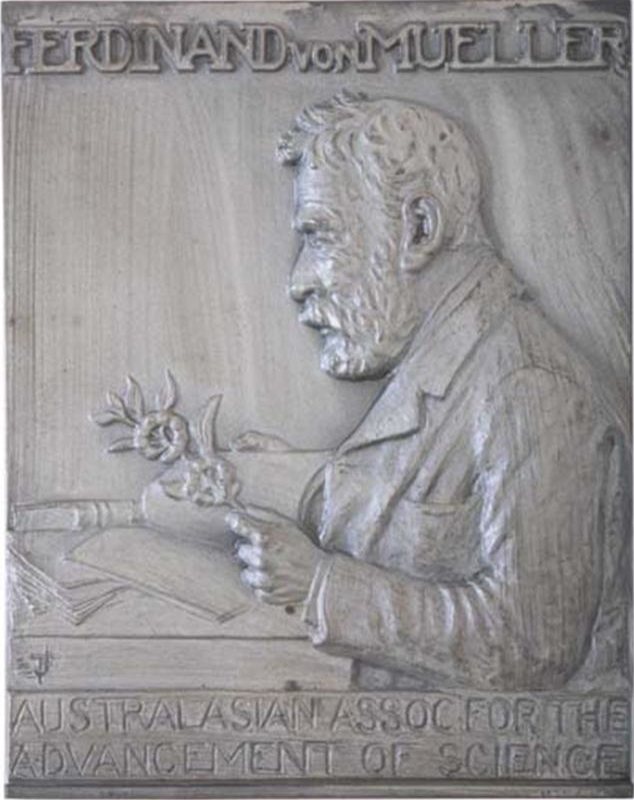
ANZAAS Mueller Medal (obverse)

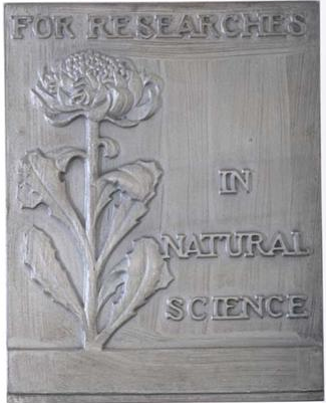
ANZAAS Mueller Medal (reverse)

- 1904 Alfred William Howitt
- 1907 James Peter Hill
- 1909 Tannatt William Edgeworth David
- 1911 Robert Etheridge
- 1913 Walter Howchin
- 1921 Richard Thomas Baker
- 1922 Charles Chilton
- 1923 Joseph Henry Maiden
- 1924 Andrew Gibb Maitland
- 1926 Frederic Wood Jones
- 1928 Leonard Cockayne
- 1930 Douglas Mawson
- 1932 John McConnell Black
- 1935 Robin John Tillyard
- 1937 Ernest Willington Skeats
- 1939 Thomas Harvey Johnston
- 1946 Ernest Clayton Andrews
- 1947 Cyril Tenison White
- 1949 William John Dakin
- 1951 Noel Benson
- 1952 Heber Albert Longman
- 1954 James Arthur Prescott
- 1955 Lionel Batley Bull
- 1957 Adolphus Peter Elkin
- 1958 Hedley Ralph Marston
- 1959 William Rowan Browne
- 1961 Ian Murray Mackerras
- 1962 Frank MacFarlane Burnet
- 1964 Frank John Fenner
- 1965 Michael James Denham White
- 1967 Dorothy Hill
- 1968 Norman H Taylor
- 1969 John Cawte Beaglehole
- 1970 Rutherford Ness Robertson
- 1971 William Edward Hanley Stanner
- 1972 Douglas Frew Waterhouse
- 1973 Reginald John Moir
- 1975 Alfred Edward Ringwood
- 1976 Lindsay Dixon Pryor
- 1977 Archibald Keverall McIntyre
- 1979 Walter Victor MacFarlane
- 1980 J Horace Waring
- 1981 John Fredrick Adrian Sprent
- 1982 Isobel Bennett
- 1983 Leonard Webb
- 1984 Lawrence Alexander Sidney Johnson
- 1985 Roy Woodall
- 1987 Hugh Bryan Spencer Womersley
- 1988 James Patrick Quirk
- 1990 Albert Russell Main
- 1991 Graham Frank Mitchell
- 1992 Adrienne Elizabeth Clarke
- 1993 Charles Rowland Twidale
- 1994 Michael Archer
- 1995 Winifred Curtis
- 1996 Sophie Charlotte Ducker
- 1997 Marilyn Renfree
- 2001 Mary E. White
- 2005 Richard Shine
- 2006 Jonathan D. Majer

=== ANZAAS Medal ===
The ANZAAS medal is awarded annually for services in the advancement of science or administration and organisation of scientific activities, or the teaching of science throughout Australia and New Zealand and in contributions to science which lie beyond normal professional activities.

Sculptor Andor Meszaros designed the Medal, which was first awarded in 1965.

==== Recipients ====
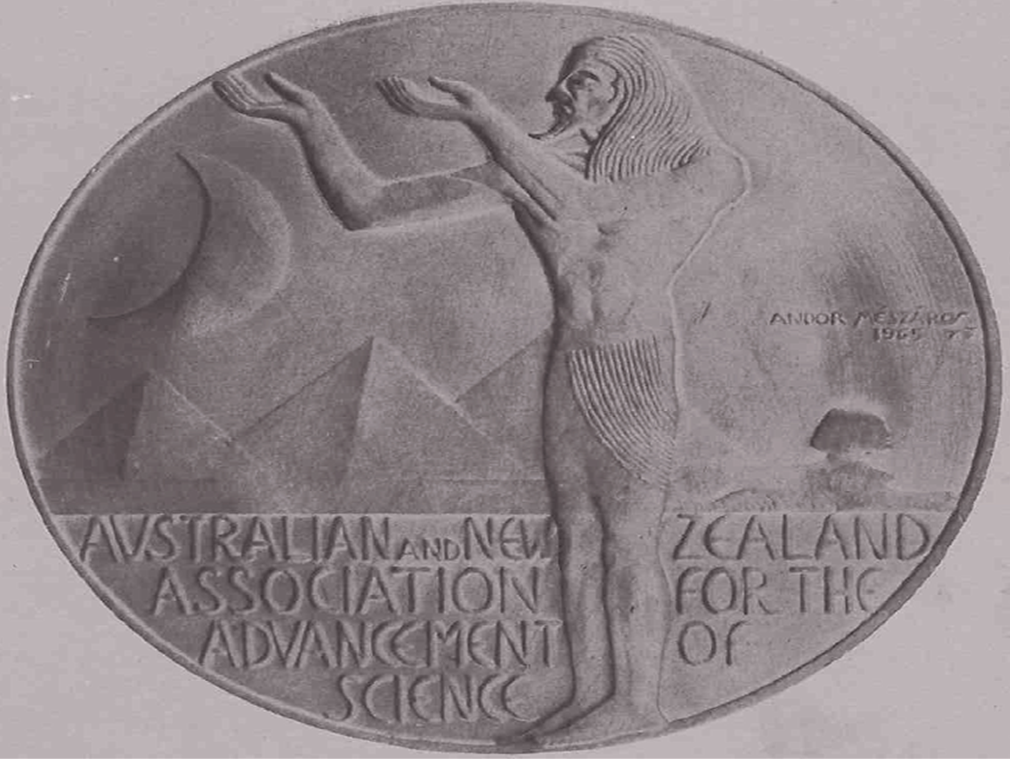
ANZAAS medal (obverse)

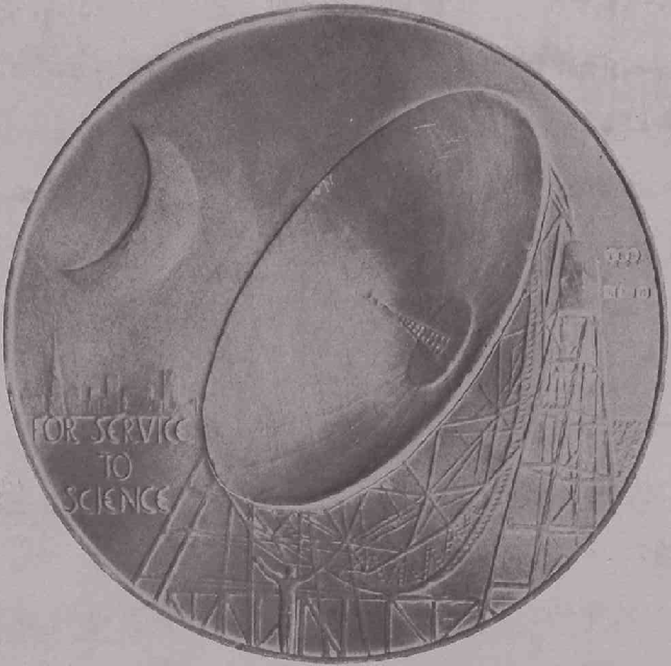
ANZAAS medal (reverse)

- 1965 John Rustin Alfred McMillan
- 1967 Lionel Batley Bull
- 1968 Rutherford Ness Robertson
- 1969 Edward Holbrook Derrick
- 1970 Arthur Bache Walkom
- 1971 John Crawford
- 1972 Charles Alexander Fleming
- 1973 Ian William Wark
- 1975 Frederick William George White
- 1976 Eric John Underwood
- 1977 Herbert Cole Coombs
- 1979 Marcus Laurence Elwin Oliphant
- 1980 Frank John Fenner
- 1981 Geoffrey Malcolm Badger
- 1982 Gustav Joseph Victor Nossal
- 1983 Dorothy Hill
- 1984 John Paul Wild
- 1985 Mollie Elizabeth Holman
- 1987 Robert Hanbury Brown
- 1988 Derek John Mulvaney
- 1990 Arthur John Birch
- 1991 Ralph Owen Slatyer
- 1992 John Robert de Laeter
- 1993 Benjamin Klaas Selinger
- 1994 John Melvin Swan
- 1995 Harry Messel
- 1996 Arvi Parbo
- 1997 Graham Allen Ross Johnston
- 1998 Samuel Warren Carey
- 1999 Donald Walter Watts
- 2004 Peter Raven
- 2005 David Blair
- 2006 Raymond Stalker
- 2007 John Boldeman
- 2015 Jacques Francis Albert Pierre Miller
- 2016 Ken Harvey
- 2017 Tom Spurling
- 2018 Kliti Grice
- 2020 Michael Alpers
- 2026 Ian Gust

== Youth ANZAAS ==
Youth ANZAAS is an annual residential scientific forum for senior Australasian secondary school students from Years 9, 10, 11 and 12. This event is designed to provide students with a broad perspective on the aims and practice of scientific endeavour, ranging from satisfying curiosity and the drive to discover, to the application of science in the real world. It gives students the opportunity to visit world-class facilities where cutting edge research is undertaken and meet leading scientists.

Recent forums have been:

- Youth ANZAAS 2026 – Melbourne, Victoria.
- Youth ANZAAS 2025 – Melbourne, Victoria.
- Youth ANZAAS 2024 – Melbourne, Victoria.
- Youth ANZAAS 2023 – Melbourne, Victoria.
- Youth ANZAAS 2022 – Not held due to pandemic
- Youth ANZAAS 2021 – Not held due to pandemic
- Youth ANZAAS 2020 – Not held due to pandemic
- Youth ANZAAS 2019 – Adelaide, South Australia.
- Youth ANZAAS 2018 – Melbourne, Victoria.
- Youth ANZAAS 2017 – Melbourne, Victoria.
- Youth ANZAAS 2016 – Brisbane, Queensland.
- Youth ANZAAS 2015 – Adelaide, South Australia.
- Youth ANZAAS 2014 – Melbourne, Victoria.
- Youth ANZAAS 2013 – Hobart, Tasmania.
- Youth ANZAAS 2012 – Dunedin, New Zealand.
- Youth ANZAAS 2011 – Brisbane, Queensland.
- Youth ANZAAS 2010 – Sydney, New South Wales.
- Youth ANZAAS 2009 – Melbourne, Victoria.
- Youth ANZAAS 2008 – Dunedin, New Zealand.
- Youth ANZAAS 2007 – Perth, Western Australia.
- Youth ANZAAS 2006 – Adelaide, South Australia.
- Youth ANZAAS 2005 – Sydney, New South Wales.
- Youth ANZAAS 2004 – Sydney, New South Wales.
- Youth ANZAAS 2003 – Melbourne, Victoria.
- Youth ANZAAS 2002 – Adelaide, South Australia.
- Youth ANZAAS 2001 – Adelaide, South Australia.

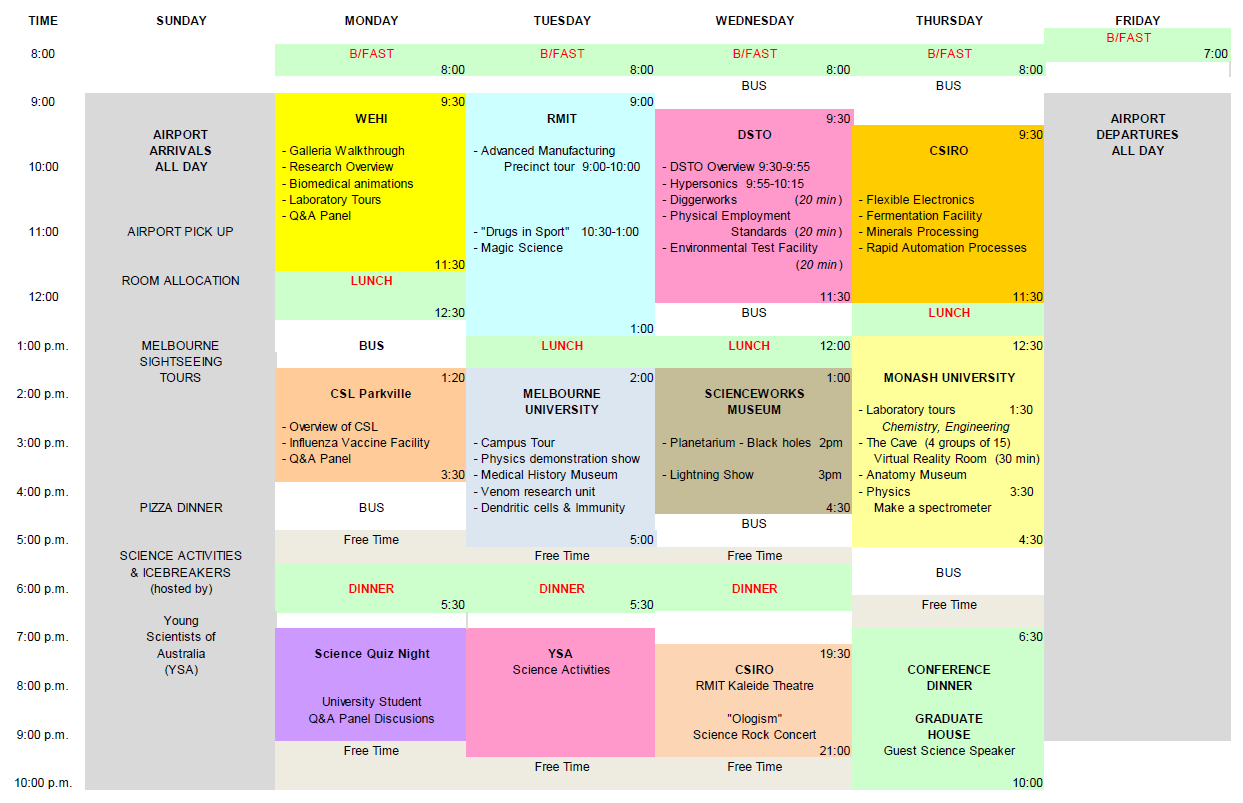
Youth ANZAAS 2014 Melbourne Itinerary

== Programs ==
=== ANZAAS – Australian Synchrotron Inaugural Winter School ===
The ANZAAS – Australian Synchrotron Inaugural Winter School was launched in July 2009. The four-day program aims to give young researchers – Honours, Masters and early PhD students – an understanding of synchrotron techniques and operation for research purposes. Participants attend lectures, tour the facility and perform beamline experiments that complement their lectures.

== Publications ==
=== Report of the ... meeting of the Australasian Association for the Advancement of Science, Australia and New Zealand. 1888–1930 ===
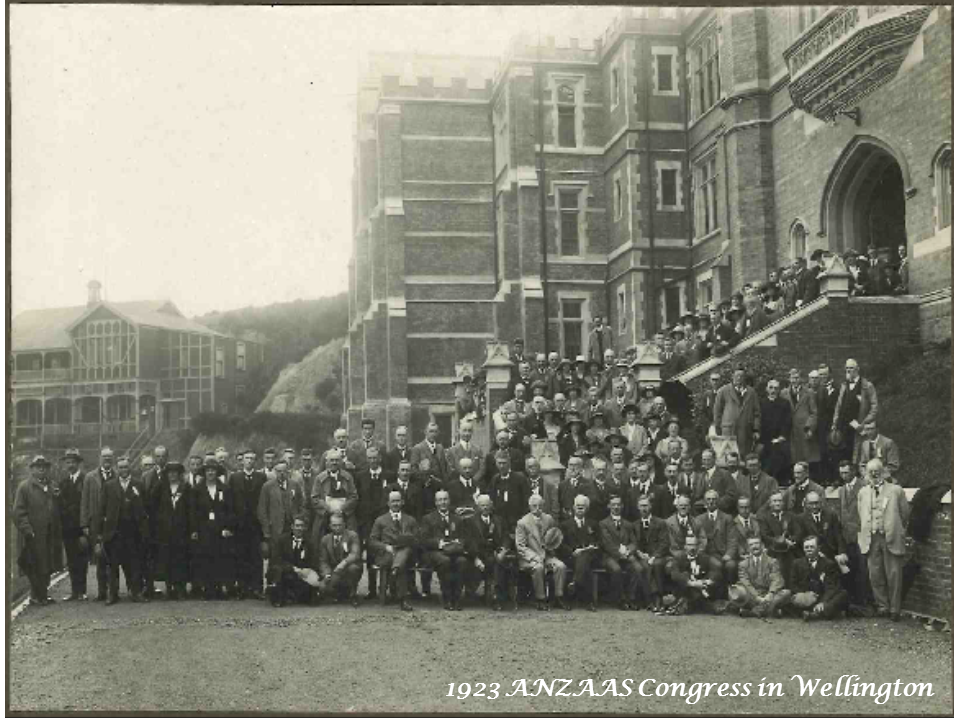
1923 ANZAAS Congress in Wellington (NZ).

- 1st Meeting ... Sydney, New South Wales. August–September 1888 – Conference President – H.C. Russell Digital Copy at archive.org
- 2nd Meeting ... Melbourne, Victoria. January 1890 – Conference President – Baron Sir Ferdinand Jacob Heinrich von Mueller Digital Copy at archive.org
- 3rd Meeting ... Christchurch, New Zealand. January 1891 – Conference President – Sir James Hector Digital Copy at archive.org
- 4th Meeting ... Hobart, Tasmania. January 1892 – Conference President – Sir Robert G.C. Hamilton Digital Copy at archive.org
- 5th Meeting ... Adelaide, South Australia. September 1893 – Conference President – Prof Ralph Tate Digital Copy at archive.org
- 6th Meeting ... Brisbane, Queensland. January 1895 – Conference President – Sir Augustus Charles Gregory
- 7th Meeting ... Sydney, New South Wales. January 1898 – Conference President – Prof. Archibald Liversidge Digital Copy at archive.org
- 8th Meeting ... Melbourne, Victoria. January 1900 – Conference President – Lt Col. Robert L.J. Ellery Digital Copy at archive.org
- 9th Meeting ... Hobart, Victoria. January 1902 – Conference President – Captain Frederick Hutton Digital Copy at archive.org
- 10th Meeting ... Dunedin, New Zealand. January 1904 – Conference President – Sir Tannatt William Edgeworth David Digital Copy at archive.org
- 11th Meeting ... Adelaide, South Australia. January 1907 – Conference President – Alfred William Howitt Digital Copy at archive.org
- 12th Meeting ... Brisbane, Queensland. January 1909 – Conference President – Sir William Henry Bragg Digital Copy at archive.org
- 13th Meeting ... Sydney, New South Wales. January 1911 – Conference President – Sir David Orme Masson Digital Copy at archive.org
- 14th Meeting ... Melbourne, Victoria. January 1913 – Conference President – Sir Tannatt William Edgeworth David Digital Copy at archive.org
- 15th Meeting ... Hobart, Tasmania. (Held in Melbourne) January 1921 – Conference President – Sir Walter Baldwin Spencer Digital Copy at archive.org
- 16th Meeting ... Wellington, New Zealand. January 1923 – Conference President – Sir George Handley Knibbs
- 17th Meeting ... Adelaide, South Australia. August 1924 – Conference President – General Sir John Monash
- 18th Meeting ... Perth, Western Australia. August 1926 – Conference President – Prof. Edward Henry Rennie
- 19th Meeting ... Hobart, Tasmania. January 1928 – Conference President – Richard Hind Cambage
- 20th Meeting ... Brisbane, Queensland. May–June 1930 – Conference President – Ernest Clayton Andrews

=== Report of the ... meeting of the Australian and New Zealand Association for the Advancement of Science. 1930–1997 ===
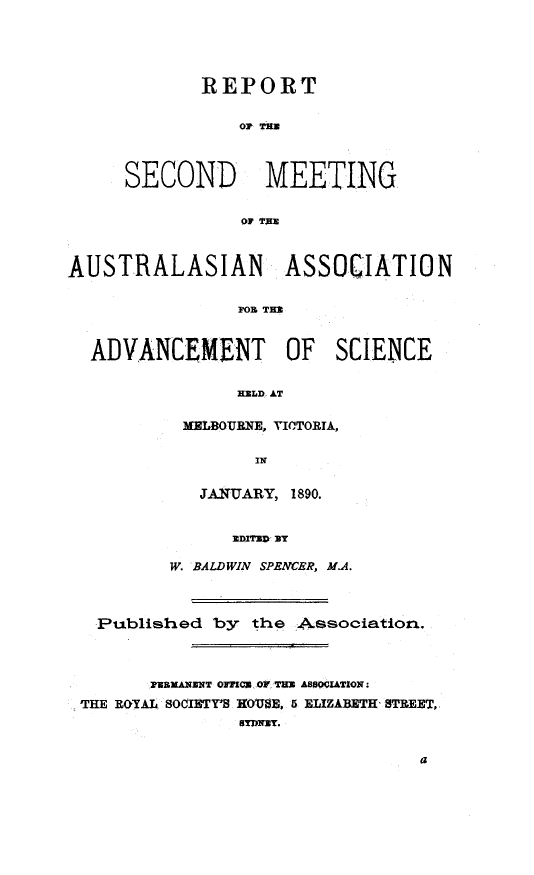
Frontispiece from the report of the association's second meeting, held in Melbourne in January 1890

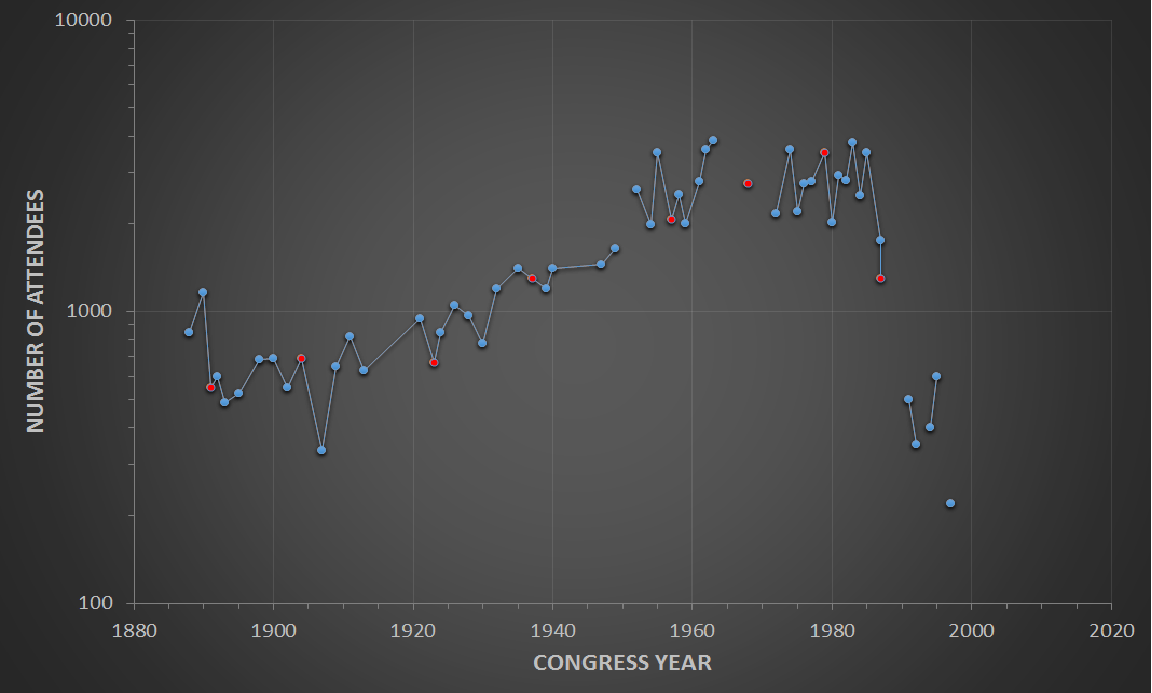
Estimate of ANZAAS congress attendees. Red points denote congresses held in New Zealand.

- 21st Meeting ... Sydney, New South Wales. August 1932 – Conference President – Sir John Hubert Plunkett Murray
- 22nd Meeting ... Melbourne, Victoria. January 1935 – Conference President – Sir Douglas Mawson
- 23rd Meeting ... Auckland, New Zealand. January 1937 – Conference President – Sir Albert Cherbury David Rivett
- 24th Meeting ... Canberra, ACT. January 1939 – Conference President – Sir Ernest Scott
- 25th Meeting ... Adelaide, South Australia. August 1940 / August 1946 – Conference President – Prof. P. Marshall Digital Copy at archive.org
- 26th Meeting ... Perth, Western Australia. August 1947 – Conference President – Prof. A. E. V. Richardson
- 27th Meeting ... Hobart, Tasmania. January 1949 – Conference President – Arthur Bache Walkom
- 28th Meeting ... Brisbane, Queensland. 1951 – Conference President – Professor Emeritus Sir Kerr Grant
- 29th Meeting ... Sydney, New South Wales. August 1952 – Conference President – Sir Douglas Berry Copland
- 30th Meeting ... Canberra, ACT. January 1954 – Conference President – Sir Theodore Rigg
- 31st Meeting ... Melbourne, Victoria. August 1955 – Conference President – Sir Richard van der Riet Woolley
- 32nd Meeting ... Dunedin, New Zealand. 1957 – Conference President – Sir Frank Macfarlane Burnet
- 33rd Meeting ... Adelaide, South Australia. August 1958 – Conference President – Sir Marcus Laurence Elwin Oliphant
- 34th Meeting ... Perth, Western Australia. 1959 – Conference President – Herbert Cole H.C. Coombs
- 35th Meeting ... Brisbane, Queensland. May–June 1961 – Conference President – Sir Samuel Macmahon Wadham
- 36th Meeting ... Sydney, New South Wales. 1962 – Conference President – Sir Noel Stanley Bayliss
- 37th Meeting ... Canberra, ACT. January 1964 – Conference President – Sir Frederick William George White
- 38th Meeting ... Hobart, Tasmania. 1965 – Conference President – Sir Rutherford Ness Robertson
- 39th Meeting ... Melbourne, Victoria. 1967 – Conference President – Sir Fred Joyce Schonell
- 40th Meeting ... Christchurch, New Zealand. 1968 – Conference President – Prof. Sir John Grenfell Crawford
- 41st Meeting ... Adelaide, South Australia. 1969 – Conference President – Sir Charles Alexander Fleming
- 42nd Meeting ... Port Moresby, Papua New Guinea. 1970 – Conference President – Prof. Samuel Warren Carey
- 43rd Meeting ... Brisbane, Queensland. 1971 – Conference President – Sir Gustav Victor Joseph Nossal
- 44th Meeting ... Sydney, New South Wales. 1972 – Conference President – Prof. Robert George Ward
- 45th Meeting ... Perth, Western Australia. 1974 – Conference President – Prof. Eric John Underwood
- 46th Meeting ... Canberra, ACT. January 1975 – Conference President – The Hon. Mr Justice John Halden Wootten
- 47th Meeting ... Hobart, Tasmania. 1976 – Conference President – Prof. W.D. Barrie
- 48th Meeting ... Melbourne, Victoria. 1977 – Conference President – Dr Lloyd Evans
- 49th Meeting ... Auckland, New Zealand. 1979 – Conference President – Dr Keith Leonard Sutherland
- 50th Meeting ... Adelaide, South Australia. 1980 – Conference President – Prof. Sir Geoffrey Malcolm Badger
- 51st Meeting ... Brisbane, Queensland. 1981 – Conference President – Dr Graham Wesley Butler
- 52nd Meeting ... Sydney, New South Wales. 1982 – Conference President – Sir Zelman Cowen
- 53rd Meeting ... Perth, Western Australia. 1983 – Conference President – Prof. Ralph Owen Slatyer
- 54th Meeting ... Canberra, ACT. 1984 – Conference President – Sir Gustav Victor Joseph Nossal
- 55th Meeting ... Melbourne, Victoria. 1985 – Conference President – Sir Edmund Percival Hillary
- 56th Meeting ... Palmerston, New Zealand. 1987 – Conference President – Sir David Stuart Beattie
- 57th Meeting ... Townsville, Queensland. 1987 – Conference President – Sir Bruce Watson
- 58th Meeting ... Sydney, New South Wales. 1988 – Conference President – Prof. Geoffrey Norman Blainey
- 59th Meeting ... Hobart, Tasmania. 1990 – Conference President – Dr. Brian H. Walker
- 60th Meeting ... Adelaide, South Australia. 1991 – Conference President – Prof. David Boyd
- 61st Meeting ... Brisbane, Queensland. 1992 – Conference President – Dr. Robyn Williams AM
- 62nd Meeting ... Perth, Western Australia. September 1993 – Conference President – The Hon. Barry Owen Jones
- 63rd Meeting ... Geelong, Victoria. September 1994
- 64th Meeting ... Newcastle, New South Wales. 1995
- 65th Meeting ... Canberra, ACT. 1996
- 66th Meeting ... Adelaide, South Australia. 1997

A 67th Meeting was scheduled for Hobart in 1998 but did not proceed.
