= Antony Underwood =

Antony Underwood FAA
- Born: 1947 (age 77–78); England
- Occupation: Ecologist

Antony James (Tony) Underwood FAA (born 1947) is an Australian ecologist.

Underwood was born in England in 1947. He studied at the University of Bristol: getting a BSc(first class honours) in 1968, a PhD in 1971, and a DSc in 1985. In 1972 he joined the University of Sydney as a Postdoctoral Research Fellow, where he remained for the duration of his career.

He is the founder and a former director of the ARC Special Research Centre on Ecological Impacts of Coastal Cities at the University of Sydney. Tony has written extensively about the processes that cause patterns of distribution and abundance in organisms in coastal habitats. In 1985 he received a D.Sc. from the University of Bristol.

Tony is now an emeritus professor in the School of Biological Sciences at the University of Sydney.

Although formally retired, Tony is still actively writing and thinking about experimental ecology.

== Awards ==
- David Syme Research Prize, awarded by the University of Melbourne (1987)
- Clarke Medal, awarded by the Royal Society of New South Wales (1987)
- Australian Marine Science Association Jubilee Prize (1989)
- Eureka Prize for Environmental Research (1993)
- Distinguished Statistical Ecologist Award (INTECOL) (1998)
- Australian Centenary Medal (2003)

Awards
| Preceded by David Groves | Clarke Medal; 1987 | Succeeded by Barry Garth Rolfe |
