= David Blair (physicist) =

Australian physicist

David Blair AO
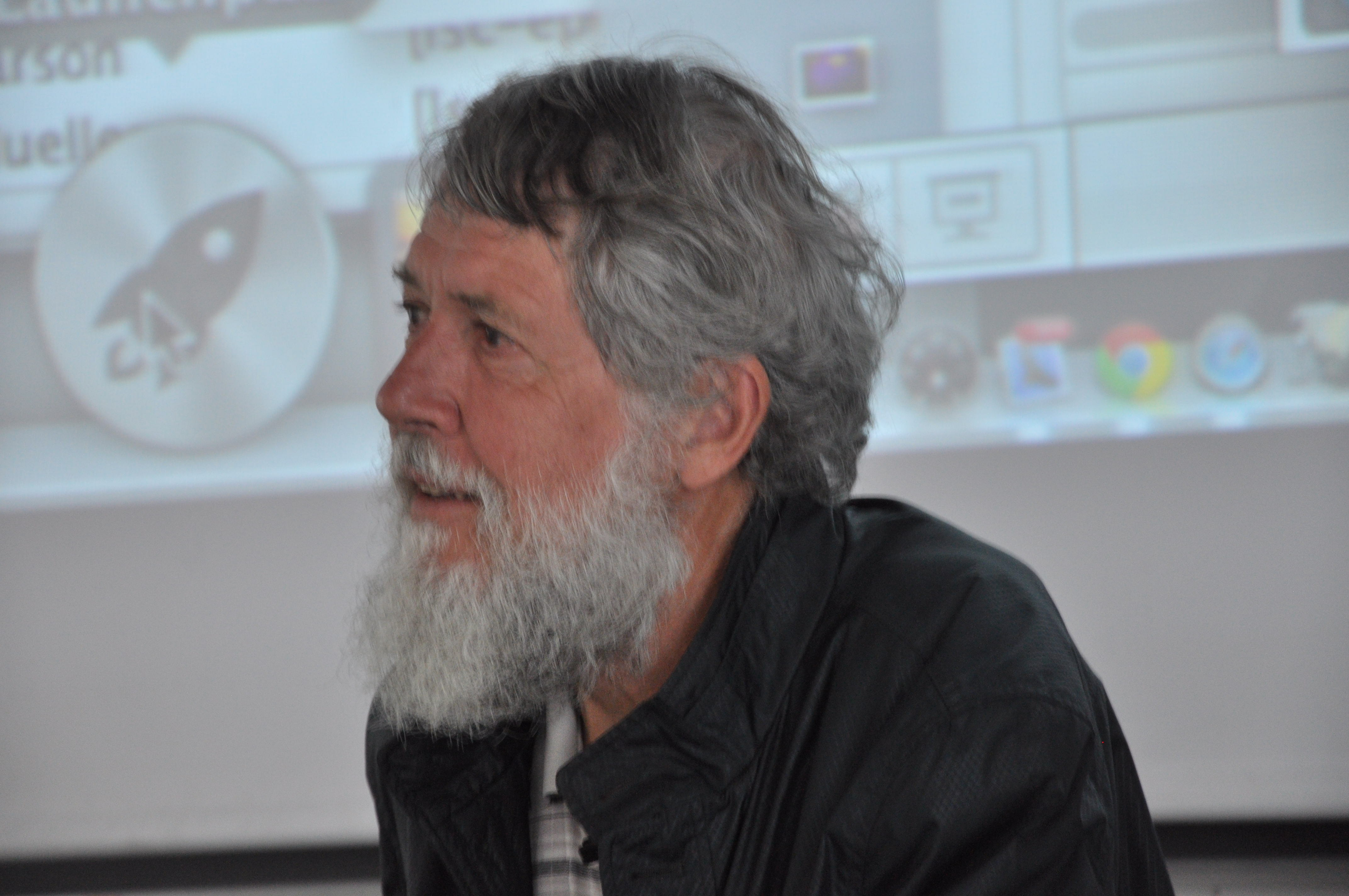
- David Blair giving a seminar about gravitational waves search in ICRANet, Pescara, in April 2014
- Born: 26 November 1946 (age 79); Lymington, Hampshire, England, UK
- Education: University of Western Australia; University of East Anglia
- Awards: Prime Minister's Prize for Science (2020); RSWA Medal (2018); ANZAAS Medal (2005); Eureka Prize (2005); Walter Boas Medal (1995)
- Scientific career
- Workplaces: University of Western Australia

David Gerald Blair (born 26 November 1946) is an Australian physicist and professor at the University of Western Australia and Director of the Australian International Gravitational Research Centre. Blair works on methods for the detection of gravitational waves. He developed the niobium bar gravitational wave detector NIOBE, which achieved the lowest observed noise temperature, and participated in a worldwide collaboration that set the best limit on the burst events in 2001. He has been responsible for numerous innovations including the 1984 invention of the first sapphire clock, a super-precise timepiece designed for space, as well as underpinning the research of the Frequency Stability Group at The University of Western Australia.

In 2003, together with John Robert de Laeter, Blair founded the Gravity Discovery Centre, a major centre for the promotion of science in Western Australia. In 2010, Blair and collaborating partners developed an educational research program called the Science Education Enrichment Project, to research the benefits of specialist exhibition centres such as the Gravity Discovery Centre. In 2014, Blair led the Einstein-First Project which aims to introduce Einsteinian Physics at an early age. The project partners included Curtin University, Edith Cowan University, Graham (Polly) Farmer Foundation, U.S. Air Force Academy and the Gravity Discovery Centre.

== Early life ==
Born in Lymington, Hampshire, England in 1946, Blair emigrated to Australia with his family in 1950. He received a Bachelor of Science degree from the University of Western Australia in 1968 and a PhD from the University of East Anglia in 1973, where he investigated superfluidity in liquid helium.

== Honours and recognition ==
Blair was awarded the Prime Minister's Prize for Science in 2020, and received a share - as a contributor - of the Breakthrough Prize in Fundamental Physics in 2016. He received the RSWA Medal from the Royal Society of Western Australia in 2018, the ANZAAS Medal from the Australian and New Zealand Association for the Advancement of Science in 2005, the Eureka Prize for Promoting Understanding of Science in 2005, and the Walter Boas Medal from the Australian Institute of Physics in 1995. He was elected a Fellow of the American Physical Society in 2013, and a Fellow of the Australian Academy of Science in 2018. Blair was appointed an Officer of the Order of Australia in the 2026 King's Birthday Honours in recognition of "distinguished service to physics, to precision measurement science, to gravitational wave research, and to scientific education".

== Publications ==
Blair is the co-author of Ripples on a Cosmic Sea: The Search for Gravitational Waves, and the editor of the book The Detection of Gravitational Waves.

He has also written a science fiction novel about a post-apocalytic Earth where contact is made to a galactic community via the essentially one-way communication starstream network. Faster than light travel or communication is assumed to be impossible, in accord with current scientific theories.
