= RSWA Medal =

Award by the Royal Society of Western Australia

The RSWA Medal is an award from the Royal Society of Western Australia, established to honour outstanding work and achievement in science relative to Western Australia.

In 1924, the Royal Society of Western Australia decided to commemorate the centenary of the birth (26 June 1824) of William Thomson, Lord Kelvin. The event was marked by the creation of the Gold Medal of the Royal Society. The award was established to honour outstanding work and achievement in science relative to Western Australia. Miss Enid Isabel Allum, of 7 Richardson Street West Perth was commissioned to design the medal for £5-5-0 honorarium. Miss Allum was a member of the Royal Society of Western Australia, and had previously been Treasurer and Social Committee member. The Royal Mint at Perth commissioned the firm of Messrs. Stokes & Co, of Melbourne to produce the dye for the medal. In 1924, the inaugural medal was presented to Dr. William John Hancock. The first three medals were struck in gold in 1924, 1929, and 1933, and ever since the medals have been struck in silver. It is also known as the Kelvin Gold Medal.

In 2013, the RSWA Medal was renamed the RSWA Forrest Medal in honour of Sir John Forrest.

== Recipients of Kelvin Gold Medal ==
Year	Name	Ref	Affiliation	Field of Study
1924	William John Hancock		Perth Public Hospital	radiography; medical application of x-rays.
1929	E S Simpson			mineralogy and geology of WA.
1933	W M Carne			plant pathology; the bitter pill of apples.
1937	Andrew Gibb Maitland			Pilbara survey and artesian water supplies.
1941	Edward de Courcy Clarke			geology of WA.
1945	L Glauert			natural sciences.
1949	Charles A. Gardner		Royal Botanic Gardens, Kew	botany, the flora of WA.
1955	Harold William Bennetts			veterinary science; live stock diseases.
1959	E J Underwood			animal nutrition and husbandry.
1966	Clee Francis Howard Jenkins			agricultural entomology and natural history.
1970	R T Prider			geology, petrology and mineralogy.
1979	Ronald Murray Berndt			anthropology; aboriginal studies.
1979	B J Grieve			botany; ecophysiology and the flora of WA.
1979	Dominic Louis Serventy			zoology; ornithology and nature conservation.
1983	John Stanley Beard			botany; vegetation classification and mapping.
1986	C A Parker			soil biology.
1995	Albert Russell Main			zoology; ecology and nature conservation.
1997	Ernest Pease Hodgkin			estuarine studies.
1997	Arthur James McComb			plant growth and ecology.
2001	Phillip E. Playford			geology and history of early Dutch exploration
2005	David Groves			economic geology
2005	Kenneth J McNamara			palaeontology
2010	Sidney Donald Bradshaw			ecophysiology
2018	David Blair			experimental physicist
2018	Barbara York Main			arachnology and zoology
