= Sprent =

Sprent is both a given name and surname. Notable people with the name include:

- Sprent Dabwido (1972–2019), Nauruan politician; former President of Nauru
- James Sprent (1808–1863), Surveyor General of Tasmania
- Janet Sprent (born 1934), British botanical scientist and professor
- John Sprent (1915–2010), English-Australian veterinary scientist and parasitologist

== Other uses ==
- Sprent, Tasmania, a locality in Australia
