= James McKern =

Australian geologist

- Born: 7 July 1888; Sydney
- Died: 14 July 1975 (aged 87); Sydney
- Education: Newington College; University of Sydney
- Occupations: Mining engineer, geologist & petrologist

James Gordon Young McKern (7 July 1888 – 14 July 1975) was an Australian mining engineer, geologist and petrologist who became an executive with the petroleum company Mobil. In retirement he was a pioneer of the nature conservation movement in Australia. His papers are held by the J S Battye Library in Perth, Western Australia and his education medals are held by the Powerhouse Museum in Sydney.

== Birth ==
McKern was the son of James McKern (1854–1941) and his wife Mary (née Tebbutt) (1856–1943) and was born in Hurstville, New South Wales. His father was Chief Inspector of Public Accounts in NSW. His maternal uncle was Ernest Tebbutt who was founder of the Sydney law firm of E.H. Tebbutt & Sons.

== Education ==
McKern attended primary schools in Summer Hill and Ashfield before commencing study aged 11 at Newington College. In 1904 and 1905 at Newington he was awarded the Wigram Allen Scholarship, awarded by Sir George Wigram Allen, sharing it in 1904 with Carleton Allen. At the end of 1906, he was named Dux of Newington College and received the Schofield Scholarship. In the Senior Public Examination of 1907 he won First Class Honours in Greek and Latin. At the University of Sydney in 1908 he was an undergraduate in the Department of Mining Engineering and won the Levy Scholarship for Chemistry and Physics. He graduated in 1913 as a Bachelor of Engineering in Mining & Metallurgy with First Class Honours.

== Work career ==
During his student years, he worked at various times in mines: first at Harden, New South Wales in a gold mine; then at Cobar, New South Wales in a copper mine; then at Wellington, New South Wales in a copper mine and; then for 10 months in Yerranderie, New South Wales in a silver and lead mine. From 1924 until his retirement in 1953, he was industrial sales manager with the Vacuum Oil Company, which later became later Mobil. He also served as the Crown Trustree of the Australian Museum from 1920 through 1940.

== War service ==
From 8 May 1916 until 4 May 1917, McKern served as a Second Lieutenant with the 1st Australian Tunnelling Company of the First Australian Imperial Force being awarded the British War Medal and Victory Medal.

== Conservation ==
In retirement McKern devoted himself to the nature conservation movement in Australia. He was President of the Australian Conservation Foundation, Chairman of the Nature Conservation Council for NSW, State Vice President of the National Parks Association and a volunteer with the National Parks and Wildlife Service. In the Centenary Edition of the Journal of the Royal Society of New South Wales he wrote a major treatise on Conservation in Australia.

== Death ==
McKern died in Sydney and an obituary was published in the September/October 1975 issue of The National Parks Journal. He was survived by his son Howard McKern Deputy Director of the Museum of Applied Arts and Sciences and President of the Royal Society of New South Wales.
