= Boldemann =

Boldeman or Boldemann is a surname. Notable people with the surname include:

- John Boldeman (born 1937), Australian nuclear scientist
- Karin Boldemann (born 1940), German artistic gymnast
- Laci Boldemann (1921–1969), Swedish music composer
