= David Groves =

Economic geologist

David Ian Groves (born 1942) is an economic geologist and Emeritus Professor at the University of Western Australia.

Born in Brighton, England, he was educated at Varndean Grammar School and gained first-class honours degree in 1963 and PhD in 1968 from the University of Tasmania.

He was President of the Geological Society of Australia from 1994 to 1996 and President of the Society of Economic Geologists from 2001 to 2002. He received the Clarke Medal of the Royal Society of New South Wales in 1986, the Royal Society of Western Australia Medal in 2005, and the Penrose Gold Medal of the Society of Economic Geologists in 2009. He has an honorary degree from the University of Western Australia and is a Fellow of the Australian Academy of Science.

He has an h-index of 56.

Awards
Preceded by H. B. S. Womersley	Clarke Medal; 1986	Succeeded by Antony Underwood
