= Andrew Gibb =

Andrew Gibb may refer to:

- Andrew Dewar Gibb (1888–1974), Scottish politician and barrister
- Andrew Gibb Maitland (1864–1951), Australian geologist
- Andy Gibb (1958–1988), singer
