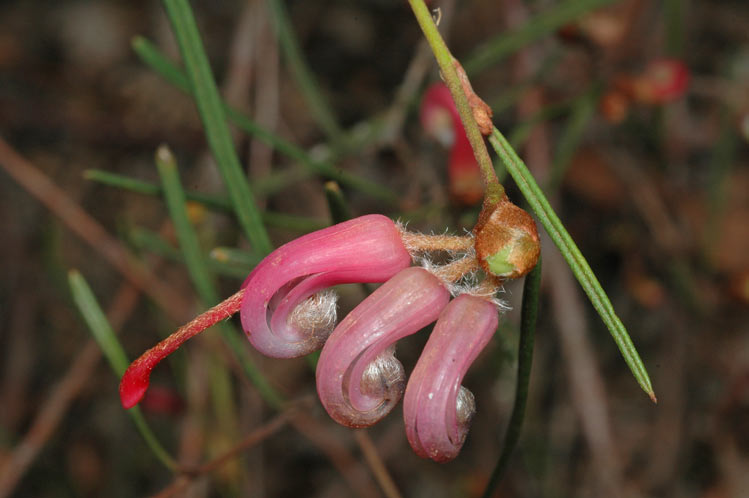
- In the Australian National Botanic Gardens

Conservation status
- Endangered (IUCN 3.1)

- Priority Three — Poorly Known Taxa (DEC)

Scientific classification
- Kingdom: Plantae
- Clade: Embryophytes
- Clade: Tracheophytes
- Clade: Spermatophytes
- Clade: Angiosperms
- Clade: Eudicots
- Order: Proteales
- Family: Proteaceae
- Genus: Grevillea
- Species: G. fulgens

Binomial name
- Grevillea fulgens C.A.Gardner

= Grevillea fulgens =

Species of shrub endemic to Western Australia

Grevillea fulgens is a species of flowering plant in the family Proteaceae and is endemic to an area near Ravensthorpe in the south-west of Western Australia. It is a spreading to straggling shrub with simple or pinnatifid leaves, and deep pink or reddish flowers.

== Description ==
Grevillea fulgens is a spreading to straggling shrub that typically grows to a height of 0.5–3 m (1 ft 8 in – 9 ft 10 in) but does not form a lignotuber. Its leaves are linear, 40–110 mm (1.6–4.3 in) long and 1–4 mm (0.039–0.157 in) wide, sometimes with a few teeth, or pinnatifid with up to eleven more or less triangular lobes 1–5 mm (0.039–0.197 in) long and 1.0–1.5 mm (0.039–0.059 in) wide. The edges of the leaves are rolled under, obscuring most of the lower surface. The flowers are arranged singly or in small groups in leaf axils or the ends of branches on a rachis 0.5–2 mm (0.020–0.079 in) long. The flowers are deep pink or reddish and partly hairy, the pistil 23–26 mm (0.91–1.02 in) long, the style red. Flowering occurs from June to October and the fruit is an oval follicle 12–15 mm (0.47–0.59 in) long.

== Taxonomy ==
Grevillea fulgens was first formally described in 1964 by Charles Gardner in the Journal of the Royal Society of Western Australia. The specific epithet (fulgens) means "shining".

== Distribution and habitat ==
Grevillea fulgens grows in shrubland or mallee heath in shallow gravelly soil on laterite, and is found in an area near Ravensthorpe in the Esperance Plains bioregion of south-western Western Australia. It is known to be a disturbance opportunist in the gravel soils of the Ravensthorpe Range.

== Conservation status ==
Grevillea fulgens is listed as endangered on the IUCN Red List of Threatened Species due to a combination of factors. It has a severely limited distribution with an estimated extent of occurrence of approximately 260 km^{2} (100 sq mi). It is threatened by open-cut nickel mining which is causing a continuous decline in habitat. Despite these threats and the species' endangered status, its population is currently stable and it is locally common within its restricted distribution.

It is also classified as priority three by the Government of Western Australia Department of Biodiversity, Conservation and Attractions, meaning that it is poorly known and known from only a few locations but is not under imminent threat.

== See also ==
- List of Grevillea species
