= McKern =

McKern is a surname. Notable people with the surname include:

- Abigail McKern (born 1955), English actor
- Howard McKern (1917–2009), Australian chemist and museum administrator
- Leo McKern (1920–2002), Australian-born English actor

== See also ==
- McKeen (surname)
