= Michael J. D. White =

Australian zoologist (1910–1983)

Michael J. D. White FRS
- Born: 20 August 1910; London, United Kingdom
- Died: 18 December 1983 (aged 73); Canberra, Australia
- Education: University College London
- Known for: important contributions to cytogenetics, speciation research, and evolutionary biology
- Awards: Mueller Medal (1965); Linnean Medal (1983)
- Scientific career
- Fields: Cytogenetics, Evolutionary biology
- Workplaces: University of Melbourne, Australian National University

Michael James Denham White FRS (London, 20 August 1910 – Canberra, 16 December 1983) was an Australian zoologist and cytologist.

White grew up in Tuscany, Italy, where he was home-schooled, before beginning undergraduate studies at University College London from 1927.

He later held the posts of Reader in Zoology at UCL, Professor of Zoology at the University of Texas, Professor of Zoology (1958–1964) and Professor of Genetics (1964–1975) at the University of Melbourne, Australia, before ending his academic career at the Australian National University.

He was elected a Fellow of the Royal Society in 1961. In 1965 he was awarded the Mueller Medal by the Australian and New Zealand Association for the Advancement of Science, and the Linnaean Medal by the Linnean Society of London in 1983. He was a member of the American Philosophical Society, the American Academy of Arts and Sciences, and the United States National Academy of Sciences.

White made important contributions to the development of cytology and cytogenetics. His work was influential in the study of speciation in biology.

== Books ==
- White, M.J.D. (1973) [1937]. The chromosomes (6th ed.). Methuen, London.
- White, M.J.D. (1973) [1945]. Animal cytology and evolution (4th ed.). Cambridge University Press.
- White, M.J.D. (1978). Modes of speciation. Freeman.
- White M.J.D. and Webb G.C. Blattodea, Mantodea, Isoptera, Grylloblattodea, Phasmatodea, Dermaptera, and Embioptera. Borntraeger. ISBN 3-443-26005-5 (3-443-26005-5)
- White M.J.D. (ed). Genetic mechanisms of speciation in insects. Symposia at the XIVth International Congress of Entomology, Canberra, Australia, 22–30 August 1972. Australian Academy of Science, Australian Entomological Society. Reidel. ISBN 90-277-0477-5 (90-277-0477-5)
