= Mary E. White =

Australian paleobotanist and author (1926–2018)

Mary E. White AM
- Born: 22 February 1926; South Africa
- Died: 5 August 2018 (aged 92); Warrigal aged care complex
- Cause of death: Manslaughter
- Education: University of Cape Town
- Known for: Author
- Spouse: Bill White
- Awards: Riversleigh medal
- Scientific career
- Fields: Paleobotany
- Workplaces: Bureau of Mineral Resources; Australian Museum

Mary Elizabeth White AM (22 February 1926 – 5 August 2018) was an Australian paleobotanist and author, notable for collecting numerous plant fossils for the Australian Museum, describing a number of new plant fossil species, and authoring several well received, large format science books for the general readership including "The Greening of Gondwana" (1986) and successors.

== Biography ==
=== Early years and scientific career ===
White was born in South Africa, grew up in southern Rhodesia (now Zimbabwe) and received a master's degree in paleobotany from the University of Cape Town. She married Bill White, a geologist; the couple came to Australia in 1955. White worked as a consultant for the Bureau of Mineral Resources in Canberra until the 1980s; she also consulted on a part-time basis for mining companies. In 1975, she was hired as a research associate for the Australian Museum; she established a collection of 12,000 specimens of plant fossils for the museum. Among her published output were descriptions of several new species and genera including Agathis jurassica, Rissikia talbragarensis and Pentoxylon australica from the Late Jurassic Talbragar Fish Beds, Squamella, a new genus of Glossopterid fructification from the Late Permian, and Cylomeia, a new genus for an Early Triassic lycopod.

She began writing large format, well illustrated science books after her husband died in 1981, highlights including "The Greening of Gondwana" (1986); "The Nature of Hidden Worlds" (1990), "Time in Our Hands" (1991), and "After the Greening: The Browning of Australia" (1994), the last of which received one of the 1994 Eureka Prizes.

In 2003, White purchased a large forested property, Falls Forest Retreat, approximately halfway between Taree and Port Macquarie in New South Wales; she established a covenant to protect the land and preserve its biodiversity. In 2013 she sold the property but with the covenant it can never be disturbed.

=== Illness and death ===
In her later years White suffered from vascular dementia and a stroke and went to live with her daughter and her daughter's husband in Bundanoon, New South Wales between 2014 and 2016. In 2016, following another stroke she moved to a nearby aged-care centre. On 5 August 2018, White was found dead in her room at the Warrigal aged care complex, apparently as a result of drugs administered without authorization by her daughter, Dr Barbara Eckersley. Eckersley was charged with her mother's murder; at her bail hearing, her barrister maintained that his client had the "belief that the aged-care centre weren't able to deal with Dr White's agitation and pain". After more than two years' delay, Eckersley was eventually found guilty, not of murder but of the lesser charge of manslaughter and was spared jail time, instead being sentenced to a two year community corrections order on account of what the judge termed her "low moral culpability" due to a "diagnosis of severe depression".

== Awards and honours ==
White received honorary doctorates from four Australian universities, plus the Riversleigh medal in 1999 for "excellence in promoting understanding of Australian prehistory". In 2010, she received a Lifetime of Conservation award from the Australian Geographic Society. She was awarded the Australian and New Zealand Association for the Advancement of Science's Mueller Medal in 2001. In 2009, she was made a Member the Order of Australia (AM) for "service to botany as a researcher and through the promotion of increased understanding and awareness of the natural world".

== Publications ==
=== Books ===
- Australia's Prehistoric Plants & Their Environment (Methuen, 1985)
- The Greening of Gondwana – The 400 Million Year Story of Australia's Plants (Reed Books, 1986)
- The Nature of Hidden Worlds – Animals and Plants in Prehistoric Australia and New Zealand (Reed Books, 1990)
- Muttaburrasaurus: An Australian Dinosaur in Its Time and Space (Houghton Mifflin, 1990) – with Robyn Muche (Illustrator)
- Amphibians of the Triassic : Tadpole Hunting 220 Million Years Ago (Houghton Mifflin, 1990) – with Robyn Muche (Illustrator)
- Time in Our Hands – Semi-precious Gemstones: Keys to the Geological Past (Reed Books, 1991)
- After the Greening: The Browning of Australia (Houghton Mifflin, 1994), received a Eureka Prize
- Listen... Our Land is Crying (Kangaroo Press, 1997)
- Reading the Rocks (Kangaroo Press, 1999)
- Running Down: Water in a Changing Land (Kangaroo Press, 2000), which was shortlisted for a Eureka Prize
- Earth Alive! From Microbes to a Living Planet (Rosenberg Publishing, 2003)

=== Scientific papers ===
refer text.
