= Walkomiella =

Walkomiella Temporal range: Permian

Scientific classification
- Kingdom: Plantae
- Division: Pinophyta
- Class: Pinopsida
- Order: incertae sedis
- Family: incertae sedis
- Genus: †Walkomiella

Species
- †W. indica (Surange & Singh 1953); †W. transvaalensis; †W. australis (Florin 1940)

Extinct genus of conifers

Walkomiella is an extinct conifer-like gymnosperm genus which occurred in India and Africa in the Lower Permian, and in Australia in the Upper Permian.

It was named for Arthur Bache Walkom, an Australian palaeobotanist.
