= William Mogford Hamlet =

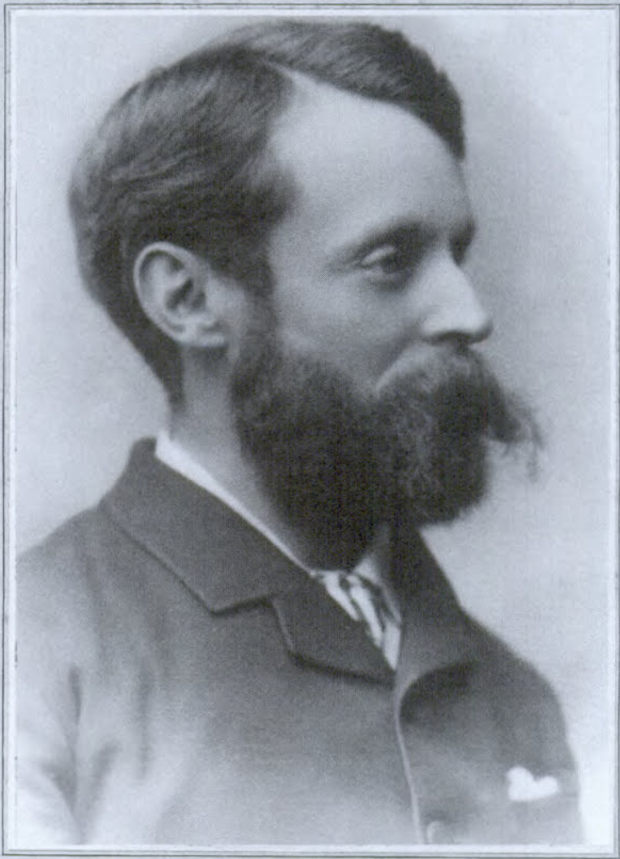
William Mogford Hamlet

William Mogford Hamlet (20 August 1850 – 18 November 1931) British-Australian chemist, bushwalker and pedestrian, was born at Portsmouth, England, elder son of William Hamlett, stay maker, and his wife Rebecca, née Mogkford. He later modified the spelling of both his middle name and surname.

Hamlet was educated at a private school in Bristol where he gained some knowledge of chemistry and electricity. He also visited the laboratories of scientists which strengthened his interest in the subjects.

He was apprenticed to a shipping firm in Bristol. However, he continued his scientific studies and attended the Bristol trade and mining school in the evenings, where he received the Queen's medal for inorganic chemistry. He gained a scholarship, which enabled him to proceed to the Royal College of Chemistry, where he studied under Sir Edward Frankland, After an appointment as demonstrator of chemistry at the Bristol Medical School, he entered into a contract with the Bristol agents of the Peruvian Government to analyse the consignments of natural Peruvian guano, then imported from the Chincha Islands and Guañape Islands.

Hamlet next received an appointment as official public analyst for the town of Kings Lynn and later fitted up a research laboratory for a large London brewery. He proceeded to the West Indies as chemist and assayer for a gold-mining company, however, he was obliged to return to England owing to illness.

He was advised to proceed to Australia for health reasons, and arrived in Sydney on 14 February 1884 where he was employed as a lecturer in chemistry for the Department of Education (New South Wales) and later as Assistant to the Government Analyst. In 1887, he was appointed Government analyst of New South Wales and retained the role until his retirement in 1915.

Hamlet was a member of the following bodies:

- Fellow of the Chemical Society of London (1875).
- Member of the Royal Society of New South Wales (1887), serving on its council in 1891-1915 and president in 1899-1900 and 1908-09.
- Fellow of the Institute of Chemistry of Great Britain (1888).
- President of the Australasian Association for the Advancement of Science, section B, chemistry and mineralogy (1892).

On 19 April 1887 Hamlet married English-born Ada Murray. They had five children. The family lived at Mosman, New South Wales and later at Glenbrook, New South Wales.

Hamlet was a keen recreational walker. In 1895 he was a co-founder of the Warragamba Walking Club, of which his friends Professor John Le Gay Brereton and Henry J. Tompkins were also members. In 1908, 1912 and 1914 he undertook three walking tours along the east coast of Australia. Accounts of these walks appeared under the title, "Pictures of Travel," in The Sydney Morning Herald, during 1908, 1912 and 1914.

Hamlet was a small man, with a mustache and beard. He was widely read and was an accomplished organist.

William Mogford Hamlet died at his residence, "Glendowan," Glenbrook, on 18 November 1931 at the age of 81 years, leaving a widow and three children.
