= Howard McKern =

Australian chemist

- Born: Howard Hamlet Gordon McKern; 23 March 1917; Sydney
- Died: 8 June 2009 (aged 92); Sydney
- Education: Newington College; Sydney Technical College; University of New South Wales
- Occupation: Deputy Director Museum of Applied Arts and Sciences

Howard Hamlet Gordon McKern (23 March 1917 - 8 June 2009) was an Australian analytical and organic chemist, museum administrator who was Deputy Director of the Museum of Applied Arts and Sciences and President of the Royal Society of New South Wales.

== Early life ==
McKern was the son of James Gordon McKern (1888–1975) a mining engineer, geologist and petrologist who became a technical executive with the petroleum company Mobil and Edith Mary Hamlet (1890–1967), daughter of William Mogford Hamlet. McKern was born in Mosman, New South Wales and educated at Newington College (1931–1935). In the Leaving Certificate Examination he was awarded First-Class Honours in Chemistry and Geology.

== Tertiary education ==
McKern received a Diploma in Chemistry from the Sydney Technical College in 1942, while studying physiology, microbiology and botany. In 1957, he completed a Master of Science degree, by thesis, at the University of New South Wales.

== Science career ==
McKern worked from 1936 until 1945 in analytical and organic chemistry in the Parramatta chemical laboratory of Meggitt Limited, and during that time was promoted to Assistant Chemist.

== Museum of Applied Arts and Sciences ==
In July 1945, McKern joined the staff of the Museum of Applied Arts and Sciences as head of the Chemistry Department and was engaged in research on the chemistry of essential oils. He was appointed Deputy Director of the Museum in 1960 and retired in 1977.

== Honours and fellowships ==
- Fellow - Royal Australian Chemical Institute (1957)
- President - UNSW Chemical Society (1960–1971)
- Recipient - Royal Society Medal (1968)
- President - Royal Society of New South Wales (1970)
- Recipient - Queen Elizabeth II Silver Jubilee Medal (1977)
- Recipient - Powerhouse Museum Distinguished Service Award (2004)

== Publications ==
=== Books ===
- William Mogford Hamlet 1850-1931 (Syd, 1995)

=== Biographical articles ===
- Frank Richard Morrison 1895-1967, Chemist and Museum Director Australian Dictionary of Biography Vol. 15, Melbourne University Press (Melb, 2000) pp. 417–418
- Arthur de Ramon Penfold 1890-1980, Chemist and Museum Director Australian Dictionary of Biography Vol. 11, Melbourne University Press (Melb, 1988) pp. 195–196
- Henry George Smith 1852-1924, Chemist Australian Dictionary of Biography Vol. 11, Melbourne University Press, Melbourne, 1988, pp. 646–647
- William Mogford Hamlet 1850-1931, Chemist and Bushwalker Australian Dictionary of Biography Supplementary Volume, Melbourne University Press, Melbourne, 2005,

=== Papers ===
- Over 40 papers in the fields of phytochemistry and chemotaxonomy have been published
