= Frank Tratman =

English-Australian physician

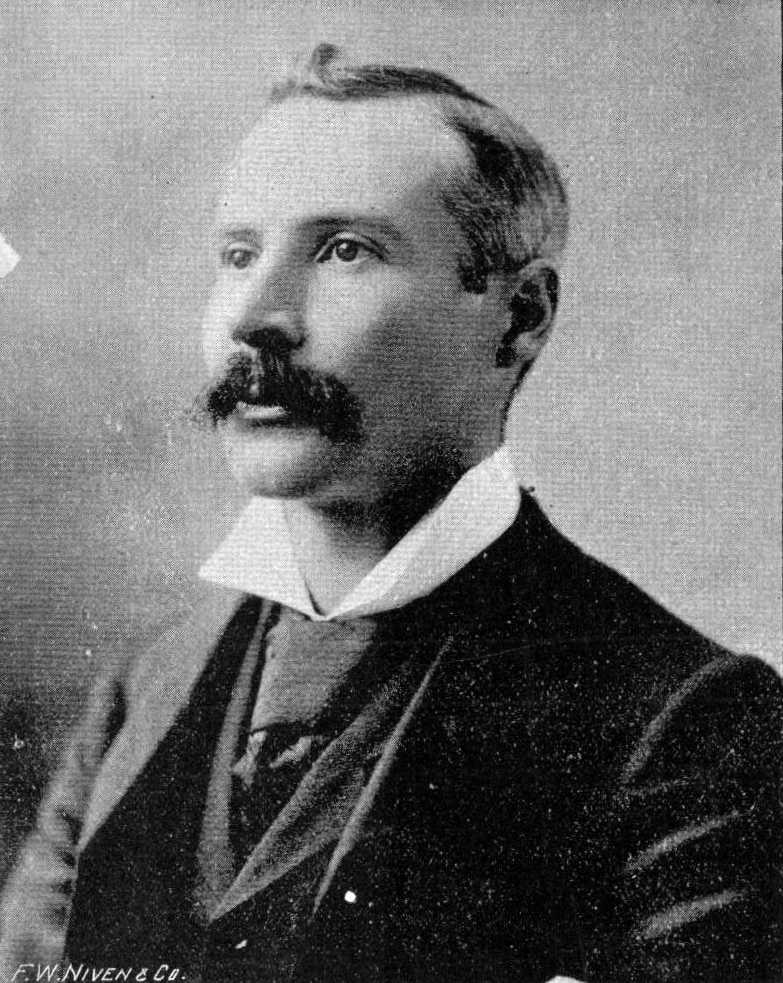
- Born: 1860; Bristol, England, United Kingdom
- Died: 2 June 1927 (aged 66–67); Enfield, New South Wales, Australia
- Scientific career
- Fields: Medicine, public health, natural history
- Author abbrev. (botany): Tratman

Signature
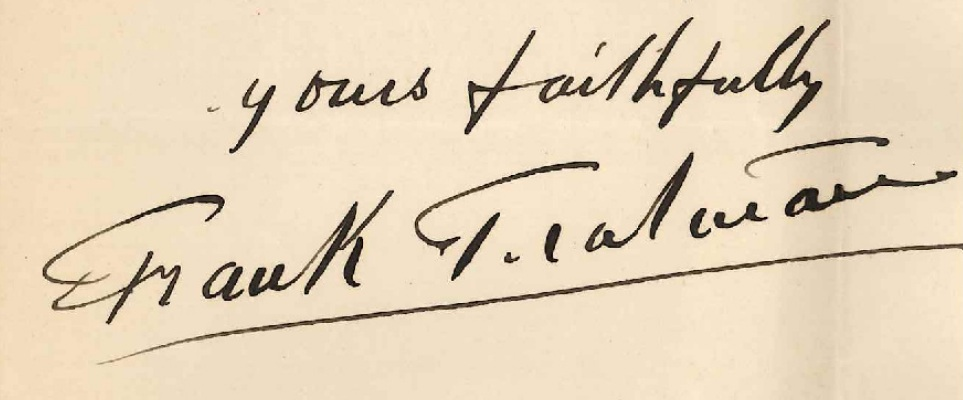

Frank Tratman (1860–1927) was a British-born physician and plant collector who contributed to both healthcare in England and Western Australia, and Australian botany.

== Life ==
Born in Bristol in 1860, he attended Bristol Grammar School in his youth, before studying medicine at The London Hospital. In 1886, Tratman accepted an offer by the Colonial Office to take up a position as the resident medical officer at Carnarvon, Western Australia in the colony of Western Australia. However, upon arriving at the capital of Perth, the Colonial Secretary deemed that he should become the Government resident medical officer of Guildford, Western Australia, a post closer to Perth. But by 1891, Tratman resigned from his post to return to the United Kingdom and resume his studies. At the University of London, he completed a Doctor of Medicine degree, and received a Diploma of Public Health before subsequently being employed as the hospital's House Surgeon.

By 1892 he had been appointed assistant medical officer in his home town of Bristol, at the same time that a cholera epidemic was sweeping northern Germany and Russia. He was summoned by the UK government to establish a quarantine barrier to prevent the epidemic's spread across the English Channel, which was reportedly successful.

In 1893, he returned to Western Australia to establish a private medical practice in Perth. On his return to the antipodes, he was active in serving his local community, working as a surgeon of the Perth Hospital, serving as a member of the Medical Board of Western Australia, and having been elected to be president of the colony's Dental Board. In 1899 he applied for a courtesy medical degree at the University of Adelaide ad eundem gradum, which he received in absentia.

He died in Enfield, New South Wales on 2 June 1927.

== Botanical legacy ==
In the field of botany, Tratman served as the president of the Mueller Botanic society (1901–1904) and the first president of the Natural History and Science Society of Western Australia (1909–1910). In 1912, he described the succulent herb Calandrinia creethae. His standard author abbreviation is Tratman.

Two species of Australian trees were named after Tratman in both their common and bionomial names:

- Tratman’s wattle, Acacia tratmaniana W.Fitzg.
- Tratman’s werrawang, Rulingia tratmannii C.R.P.Andrews (a synonym of Commersonia craurophylla (F.Muell.) F.Muell.)

Herbarium specimens collected by "Dr. Tratman" are now cared for by the Western Australian Herbarium.
