= Robert Logan Jack =

Australian geologist (1845–1921)

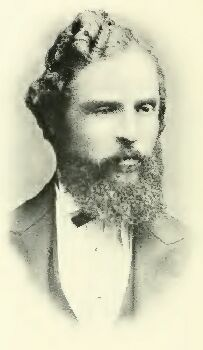
Robert Logan Jack in 1877, at about the time he went to Queensland

Robert Logan Jack (16 September 1845 – 6 November 1921) was government geologist in Queensland, Australia, for twenty years. There is a minor waterway on Cape York; Logan Jack Creek, whose outflow is located some 7 kilometres from Ussher Point, which is named after him.

Jack was born at Irvine, in Ayrshire, Scotland the son of Robert Jack, a cabinet-maker, and his wife Margaret, née Logan.

In 1888 Andrew Gibb Maitland was assigned Second Assistant Geologist and reported to Jack.

Jack resigned his appointment in 1899. During his time there he mapped the coal sites in Bowen, Flinders River and Townsville. He reported on many gold, tin, silver and sapphire areas, and his early work led to the search for artesian water and the construction of the first government bore in the Great Artesian Basin. He was also a prolific author on the geology, mineralogy and palaeontology of Queensland.

== Publications ==
- Northmost Australia, George Robertson and Co., Sydney, 1922, reprinted by Hesperian Press, Western Australia, 1998, ISBN 0-85905-222-2
- With Robert Etheridge junior, The Geology and Paleontology of Queensland and New Guinea
- Handbook of Queensland Geology

Awards
| Preceded by Ralph Tate | Clarke Medal; 1895 jointly with Robert Etheridge, Jr. | Succeeded by Augustus Gregory |
