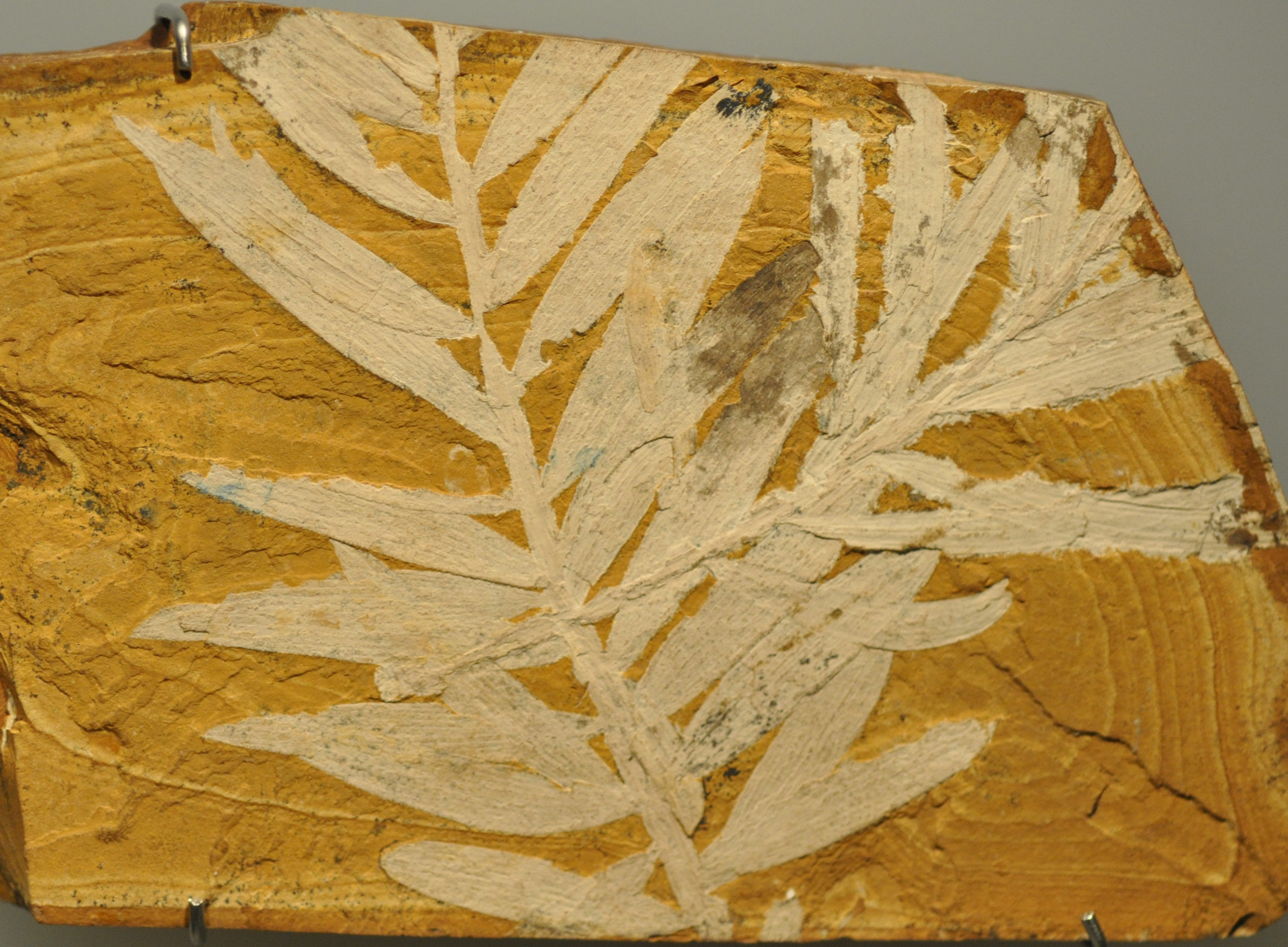

Scientific classification
- Kingdom: Plantae
- Clade: Tracheophytes
- Clade: Gymnosperms
- Division: Pinophyta
- Class: Pinopsida
- Order: Araucariales
- Family: Araucariaceae
- Genus: Agathis
- Species: †A. jurassica

Binomial name
- †Agathis jurassica M. White (1981)

= "Agathis" jurassica =

"Agathis" jurassica Temporal range: Tithonian

Extinct species of conifer

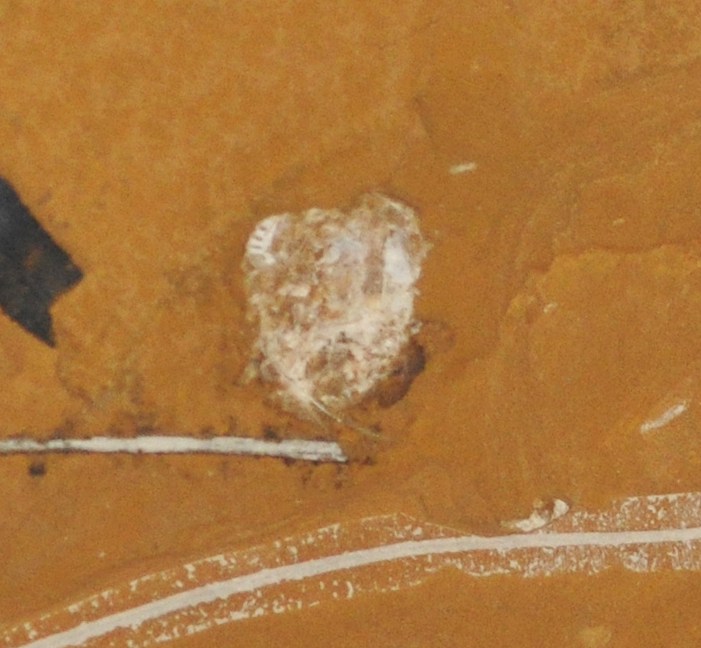
Reproductive cone of Agathis jurassica

"Agathis" jurassica is an extinct coniferous tree found in the Talbragar Fish Beds of New South Wales. The beds were discovered in 1889 near the Farrs Hills in the Talbragar River valley. Specimens from the area were briefly examined by Australian palaeontologists upon discovery and published by R. Etheridge Jr. later that year. The initial classification identified Agathis jurassica as Podozamites lanceolatus. This name was upheld through further inspections by Walkom in 1921, but the species was reclassified as Agathis jurassica in 1981 by Mary White. In 1999, placement in Agathis was doubted, and the species has been referred to as Podozamites jurassica. The species is found predominantly in the Southern Hemisphere with marginal expanses into the Northern Hemisphere.

== Description ==
=== Leaves ===
- Lanced leaves, between 4–7 cm in length, between .5-.75 cm in width
- Spiral phyllotaxy
- Parallel venation
  - between 5-8 veins per leaf
- Swollen stem bases with scale leaves
- Foliage spur branchlets

=== Cones ===
- Cylindrical cone with sub-triangular bract scales

== Taxonomy ==
The species was originally classified as Podozamites lanceolatus, after a very brief inspection of over one thousand specimens originally collected from the site. A more detailed account of all the flora was performed in 1921 by Walkom where the initial classification was upheld, yet it was noted that the flora from the area was likely coniferous. The fossils found at the Talbragar Fish Beds had similarities in leaf appearance to known records of Podozamites lanceolatus. However, in this species, the pinnae distinctly grow from opposite sides of the rachis rather than growing spirally around it. White notes this error as well as the fact the variation in leaf sizes along smaller branchlets signal that the branches are in fact foliage spurs, which she considered not characteristic of Podozamites. In 1981 these contrasts sparked White to conduct an intensive review of information available on the two genera and led her to the conclusion that the specimen found in the Talbragar Fish Beds were more closely linked to Agathis rather than Podozamites, and the species was described as Agathis jurassica. The reproductive cones recovered from the site were also initially classified under a different name and later also reclassified as White to be those of Agathis jurassica. The cones were believed to be of the same family as Agathis, but were classified as Araucarites grandis.

In 1999, in a review of fossil Araucariaceae, Hill and Brodribb considered that the oldest reliably identified fossils of the genus Agathis were from the Middle Eocene of Australia, and so doubted whether Agathis jurassica had been correctly identified. Subsequent authors have used the name Podozamites jurassica, although this combination had apparently not been validly published as of 2017.

== Talbragar Fish Beds ==
The Talbragar Fish Beds are a well known geological site to the Northwest of Sydney and Wollemi National Park in Southeastern Australia that have produced thousands of incredibly preserved individual fossil specimens. The area is believed to have been a large and shallow freshwater lake that was surrounded by lush, woody vegetation, classified as a "kauri pine" forest. The lake supported a large population of fish as well as a diverse range of flora along the shore that gave home to many insects as well. Examination of fish at the site give reason to believe there was a large scale event that rapidly inundated the lake with sediment; likely volcanic ash that trapped and buried the fish as well as some of the surrounding vegetation. The fossils in this locale are predominantly siliceous impressions, further supporting the idea that volcanic ash buried the specimen and left the stark white impressions of the flora over time. Fossilization in this area occurred in the Early to Middle Jurassic where Australia was still a part of Gondwana, under the Tethys Sea, and the site's climate was believed to be moderately warm with increased carbon dioxide levels in the atmosphere that allowed for lush vegetation to flourish.
