= William John Dakin =

Zoologist (1883–1950)

- Born: 23 April 1883; Toxteth, Liverpool
- Died: 2 April 1950 (aged 66); Turramurra, Sydney
- Occupation: Scientist

William John Dakin (23 July 1883 – 2 April 1950) was a zoologist who is remembered for the large number of his students who achieved prominence in the area of zoology, and for the number of books and papers he wrote on many scientific fields.

== Early life ==
Dakin was born in Toxteth, a suburb of Liverpool, England in 1883, the son of William and Elizabeth Dakin. His father was a coal merchant.

== Career ==
At the University of Liverpool Dakin attained his BSc with first class honours in Zoology in 1905, his MSc in 1907 and his DSc in 1911 on osmotic pressure and the blood of fishes.

In 1912 he applied and was appointed as the chair of Biology at the recently established University of Western Australia. Before arriving to take his post, he married Catherine Lewis in 1913.

While at UWA, Dakin published The Elements of Animal Biology in 1918, chaired the extension committee, twice visited the Houtman Abrolhos and was the president of the Royal Society of Western Australia.

He was also a known supporter of eugenics, authoring a book with Dr Everitt Atkinson called Sex Hygiene and Sex Education in 1918. Around 1921, he had attempted to establish a Eugenics Society. In 1935 he published an article backing proposals for forced sterilization of those deemed 'mentally and physically unfit persons'.

Dakin was professor of Zoology at the University of Sydney from 1929 to 1947.

In 1949 he was awarded the Mueller Medal by the Australian and New Zealand Association for the Advancement of Science.

He was a frequent contributor to early issues of Walkabout. Among the books he wrote was Whalemen Adventurers (1934), a history of whaling in Australia. A revised edition was issued in 1938; it was reissued by Sirius Books in 1963.

== Legacy ==
In 1977 a $2000 bequest from his wife was granted to the University of Sydney in his memory. Known as the William John Dakin Memorial Prize in Zoology, it is awarded annually to a Zoology student attaining first class honours in biology.
