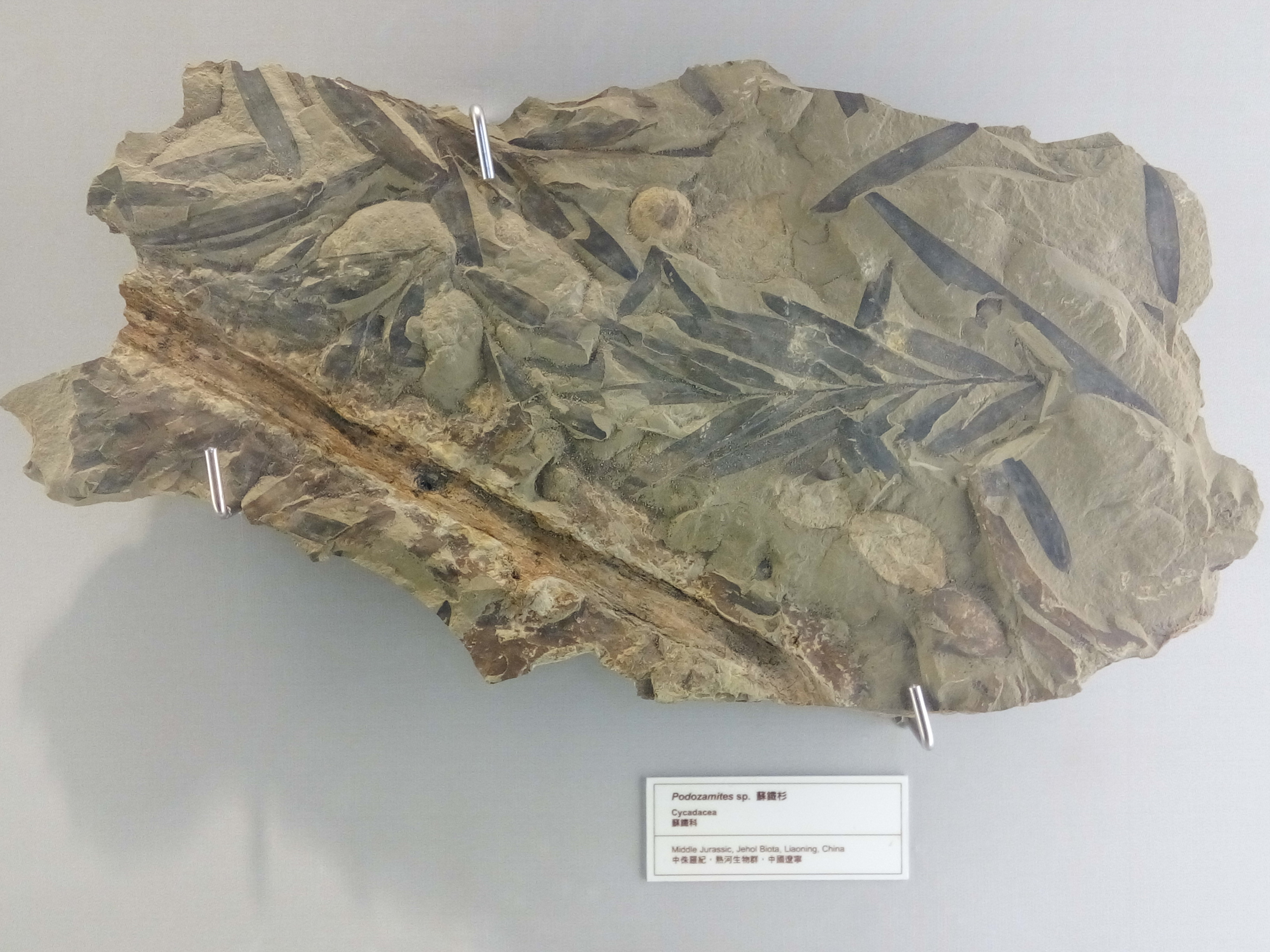
- Fossil Podozamites from China

Scientific classification
- Kingdom: Plantae
- Clade: Tracheophytes
- Clade: Gymnospermae
- Division: Pinophyta
- Class: Pinopsida
- Genus: †Podozamites; Braun 1843

= Podozamites =

Podozamites Temporal range: Middle Triassic–Late Cretaceous

Extinct genus of conifers

Podozamites is an extinct genus of fossil conifer leaves. In its broader sense, it has been used as a morphogenus (form taxon) to refer to any broad leaved multi-veined conifer leaves. Modern broad-leaved conifers with a similar form include Agathis in the family Araucariaceae and Nageia in Podocarpaceae, with some Podozamites sensu lato probably belonging to the same families.

In a more narrow sense, Podozamites has been used to refer to the leaves of a probably monophyletic group of deciduous broad leafed voltzialean conifers which lived in the Northern Hemisphere, particularly East Asia and Siberia, during the Late Triassic to early Late Cretaceous, where it formed part of wet coal swamp communities.

== Description ==
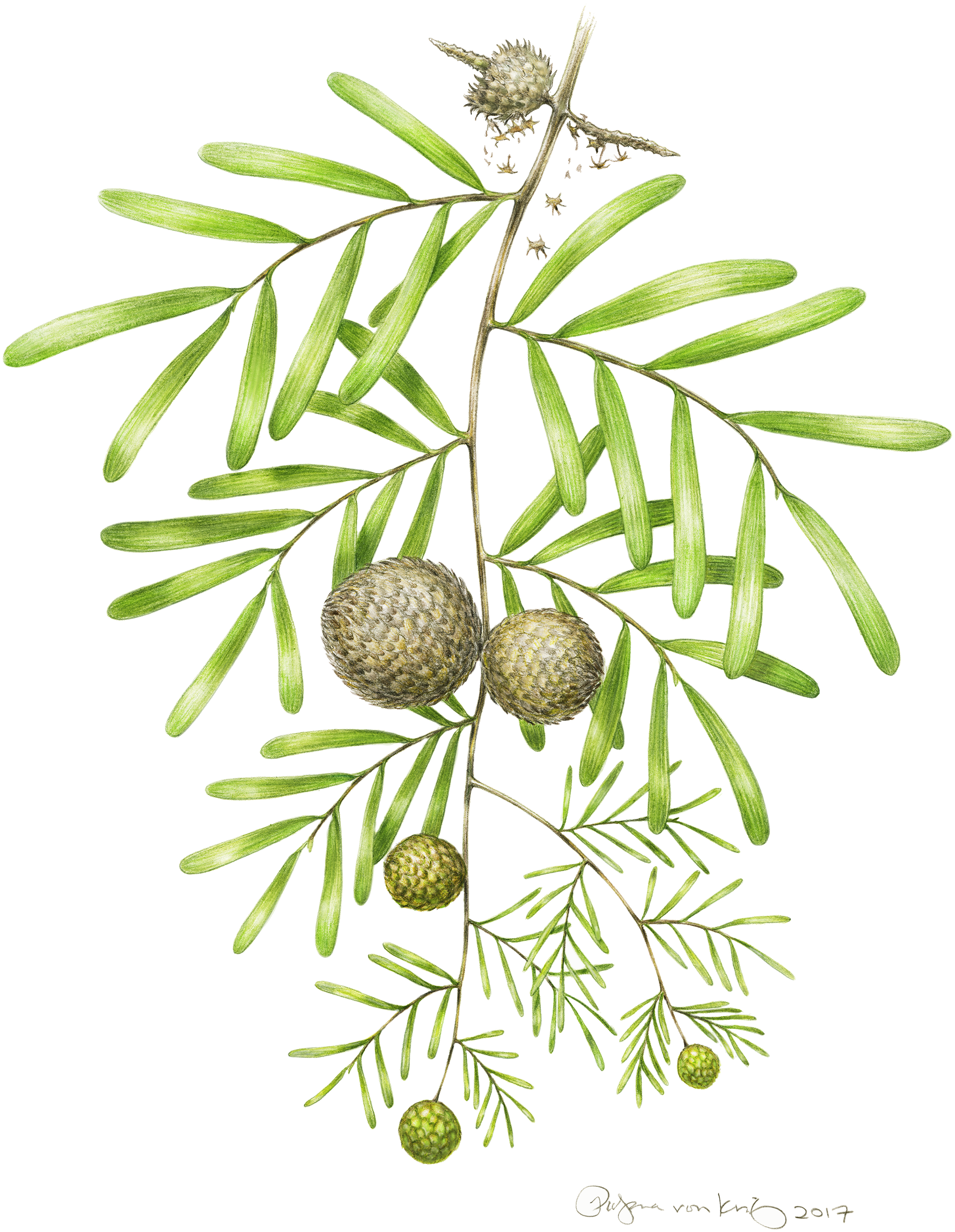
Reconstruction of Podozamities harrisii with the associated cones of Krassilovia mongolica from the Early Cretaceous of Mongolia. Art by Pollyanna von Knorring

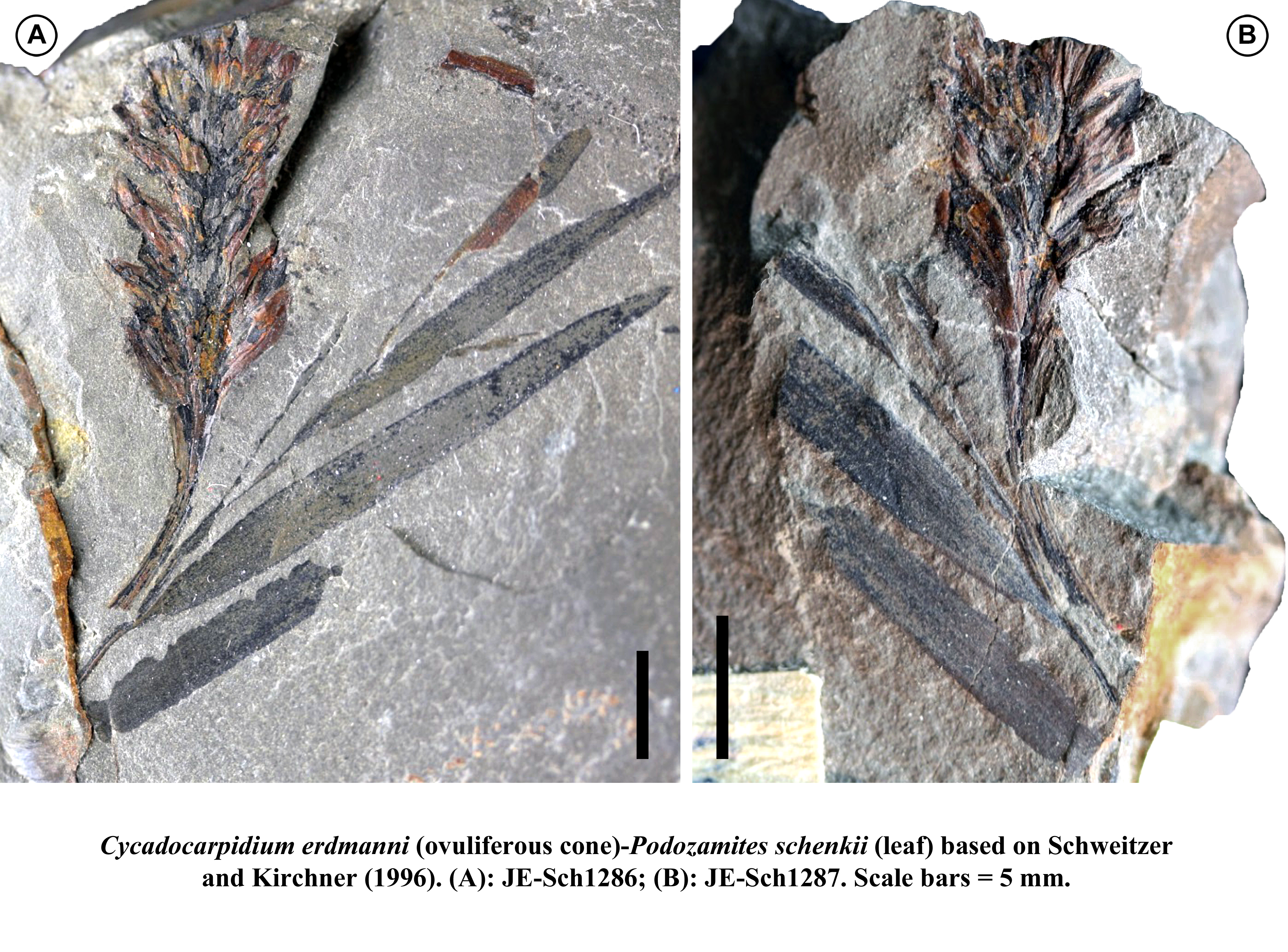
Cycadocarpidium erdmanni cone & Podozamites schenkii leaves from the Late Triassic of Iran

In the right conditions, Podozamites leaves sensu stricto preserve delicate cuticle and insect damage, and are thought to have been regularly shed. They are associated with conifer cones of the genera Swedenborgia, Cycadocarpidium, and Krassilovia.

Podozamites leaves are strap-shaped or oblong, with smoothly parallel sides and dense longitudinal veins. They attach to a slender branch in a helical pattern, but twist into a distichous orientation (lying in a single plane along the branch). Both the upper (adaxial) and lower (abaxial) surfaces of the leaf have cells arranged into longitudinal bands. Some bands on the abaxial surface host broad stomata which are paracytic (with a subsidiary cell lateral to and paralleling each guard cell in a stoma). This is similar to Gnetales and especially bennettitaleans, suggesting that they may be related to these groups.

The Krassilovia cone is roughly spherical and consists of densely packed interlocking overlapping bract-scale complexes surrounding a central axis. The cone is thought to have disintegrated at maturity to release the winged seeds. By contrast, the Swedenborgia and Cycadocarpidium cones are elongate and are only loosely packed.

== Evolutionary history ==
Podozamites sensu stricto has been suggested to be closely related to Telemachus/Heidiphyllum (seed cone/leaves respectively), a broad-leaved conifer known from the Triassic of Gondwana. Podozamites sensu stricto first became widespread at mid-latitudes during the Late Triassic. During the Early Jurassic in East Asia, it formed almost monospecific assemblages where it was the dominant plant. Over the course of the Jurassic, the distribution shifted northwards in response to the drying of the lower latitudes, becoming restricted to between 60 and 30 degrees north by the Early Cretaceous. Podozamites senus stricto would become extinct during the Turonian stage of the Late Cretaceous, coincident with the arrival of flowering plants into the Siberian region.

== Species ==
A number of species within the genus were listed by Fossilworks, as of May 2021: Podozamites agardhianus, Podozamites distans, Podozamites lanceolatus, Podozamites longifolius, Podozamites mucronatus, Podozamites pinnatus and Podozamites schenki. Agathis jurassica, initially identified as Podozamites lanceolatus, has also been placed in this genus. Podozamites harrissii from the Early Cretaceous of Mongolia is associated with Krassilovia mongolica, while Podozamites schenkii is associated with the Triassic-Jurassic Swedenborgia cryptomerioides and Triassic Cycadocarpidium erdmanni. It has been noted that extant Agathis (Araucariaceae) and Nageia (Podocarpaceae) qualify as members of Podozamites under its morphogenus sense.
