= Lionel Bull =

Australian veterinary scientist and CSIRO scientific administrator

Lionel Batley Bull
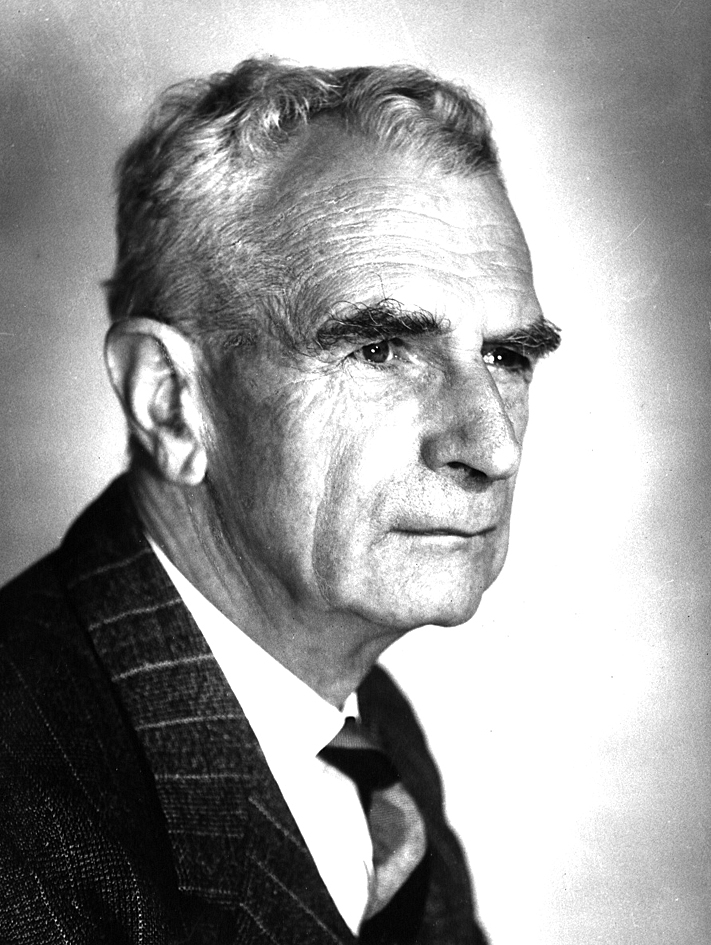
- Lionel Bull
- Born: April 27, 1889; Hawthorn, Victoria
- Died: May 5, 1978 (aged 89); Fitzroy, Victoria
- Citizenship: Australian

Lionel Batley Bull CBE DVSc FAA (27 April 1889 – 5 May 1978), was an Australian veterinary scientist and CSIRO scientific administrator.

In 1955 he was awarded the Mueller Medal by the Australian and New Zealand Association for the Advancement of Science.
