= Experimental ecology =

Experimental ecology is the scientific study of ecological relationships and processes using controlled experiments, mostly which focus on understanding how living organisms interact with their natural environment. Experimental ecologists have multiple methods to conduct experiments such as manipulating environmental variables in controlled settings, which help investigate how these factors affect the performance and behavior of organisms, most importantly plants. The goal of experimental ecology is to gain new knowledge into complex ecological systems, such as plant-climate relationships, species interactions, and responses to environmental changes. Data collected from these experiments is used to draw conclusions about ecological processes, patterns, and underlying mechanisms.

Experimental ecology is a new methodology in ecological research, formalized by Henrik Lundegårdh in his 1925 book, Klima und Boden. As stated above, Experimental ecology is a branch of ecology that focuses on conducting controlled experiments to understand various ecological phenomena. It involves designing and implementing experiments in natural or controlled environments to test hypotheses and investigate ecological processes. But what are the key components of these experimental ecological methods?

1. Hypothesis Testing: Researchers formulate hypotheses about ecological processes or relationships and design experiments to test these hypotheses under controlled conditions. 2. Controlled Environments: Experiments are often conducted in controlled environments such as laboratories, greenhouses, or mesocosms (scaled-down ecosystems). This allows researchers to manipulate specific variables while keeping other factors constant. 3. Manipulative Experiments: Researchers intentionally manipulate one or more variables within the experimental setup to observe the effects on ecological processes or organisms. These manipulations help elucidate cause-and-effect relationships. 4. Field Experiments: Some experimental ecology studies are conducted directly in natural environments, allowing researchers to observe ecological processes in their natural context while still controlling certain variables. 5. Data Collection and Analysis: Experimental ecologists collect data on relevant ecological parameters before, during, and after the experiment. Statistical analysis is then used to interpret the data and draw conclusions about the effects of experimental treatments. 6. Long-Term Studies: Some experimental ecology research involves long-term monitoring or manipulative experiments to study ecological processes over extended periods. This enables researchers to assess how ecosystems respond to environmental changes over time. Experimental ecology plays a crucial role in advancing our understanding of ecological systems, including topics such as species interactions, population dynamics, community structure, ecosystem functioning, and responses to environmental change. This method shows much promise in the future for helping ecologists get better results in their research. Researchers in experimental ecology often publish their findings in scientific journals dedicated to ecology, environmental science, or specific subfields within ecology. Examples of such journals include Ecology, Journal of Ecology, Oecologia, and Ecological Monographs.
