= Andrew Gibb Maitland =

Australian geologist (1864–1951)

Andrew Gibb Maitland (30 November 1864 – 27 January 1951) was an English-born Australian geologist.

Maitland was born in Birkby, Yorkshire, England, and studied civil engineering at Yorkshire College of Science, Leeds, where he was influenced by professor of geology Alexander Henry Green.

In 1888 he was assigned Second Assistant Geologist to the Geological Survey of Queensland. Maitland reported to Robert Logan Jack who assigned him to survey the land in the Mackay region. In 1891 he was seconded by Sir William MacGregor on the geological examination of British New Guinea.

From 1896 to 1926 he was the Government Geologist in Western Australia, and in 1898 he published Bibliography of the Geology of Western Australia. In 1901 he served as geologist on Drake-Brockman's expedition to the Kimberley.

In 1915 he became President of the Royal Society of Western Australia. In 1924 he was awarded the ANZAAS's Mueller Medal, and in 1927 he was awarded the Clarke Medal by the Royal Society of New South Wales.

He died in Subiaco, Western Australia, and was buried in the Anglican section of Karrakatta Cemetery. Gibb River and Maitland Range, in the Kimberley region, commemorate Maitland and recall that he was generally known as Gibb Maitland.

== Legacy ==
Maitland's contributions to the study of geology in Western Australia is commemorated by the Gibb Maitland Medal, usually awarded annually by the Western Australian Division of the Geological Society of Australia for substantial contributions to geoscience in Western Australia, with particular consideration given to contributions that relate to the occurrence or discovery of mineral resources.

Awards
| Preceded by Charles Hedley | Clarke Medal; 1927 | Succeeded by Ernest Clayton Andrews |
