= John Sprent =

Australian veterinary scientist (1915–2010)

Professor John Sprent CBE FAA

Personal details
- Born: John Frederick Adrian Sprent; 1915 Mill Hill, Middlesex, England
- Died: 2010 (aged 94–95)

John Frederick Adrian Sprent (1915 – 2010) born in Mill Hill, England was an Australian veterinary scientist and parasitologist.

In 1981 he was awarded the Mueller Medal by the Australian and New Zealand Association for the Advancement of Science.
