= John Boldeman =

Australian nuclear scientist

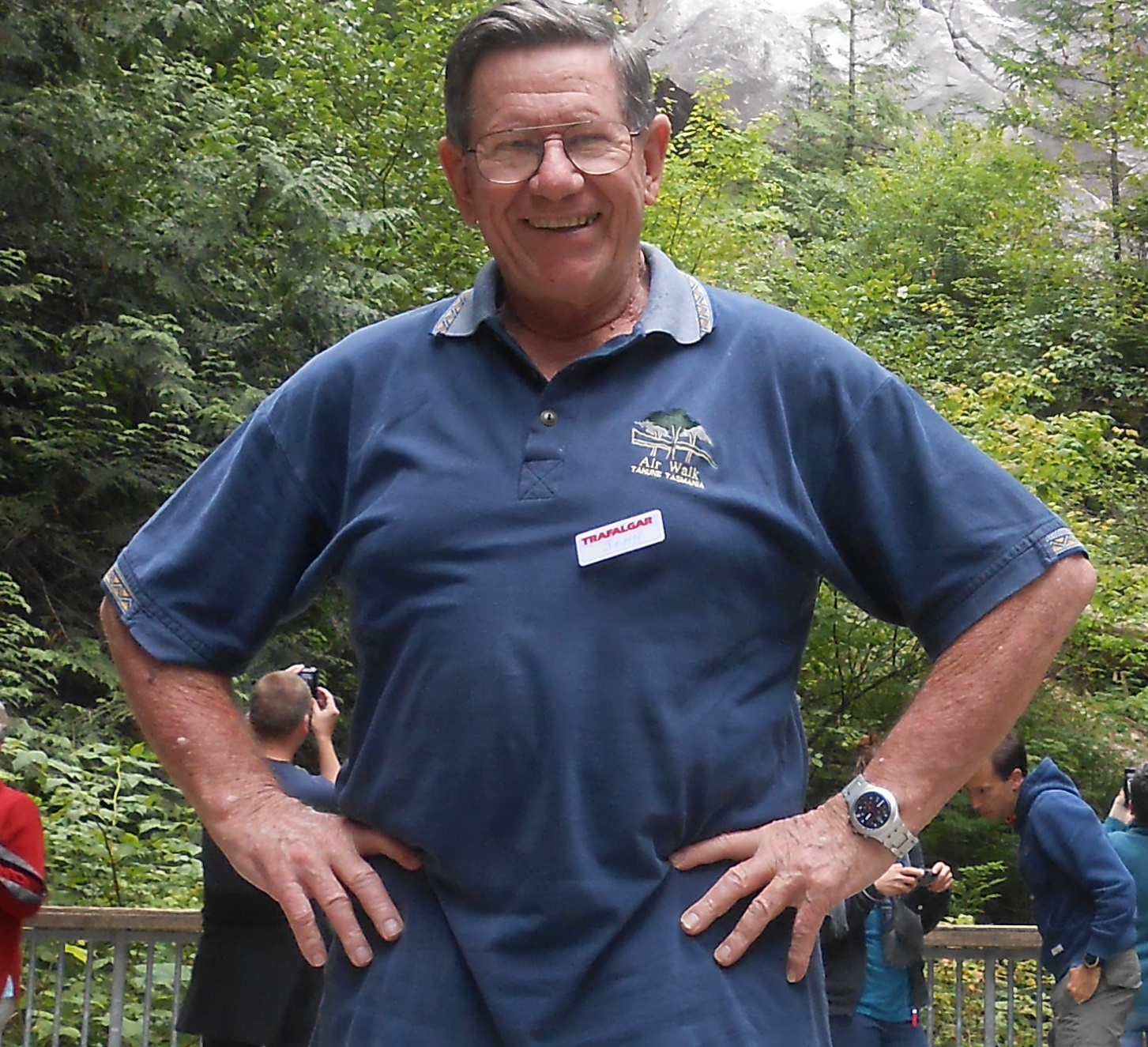
- Boldeman c. 2014
- Born: 19 December 1937 (age 87); Longreach, Queensland, Australia

John William Boldeman is an Australian nuclear scientist and winner of many scientific awards and medals, including an ANZAAS Medal in 2007, the Clunies Ross Lifetime Achievement Award, as well as an being officer of the order of Australia. He was born in Longreach, Queensland, the eldest of seven children born to Harold and Eileen Boldeman. He spent much of his childhood in Maryborough, Queensland and attended the Maryborough Christian Brothers High School and then Nudgee College in Brisbane. He went on to study physics at the University of Queensland and joined the then Australian Atomic Energy Commission on graduation, continuing his studies in association with his work. Boldeman worked at the AAEC, and then ANSTO, for 42 years, rising to the position of Director of Physics. He was awarded a PhD from Wollongong University, and a D.Sc. from University of New South Wales in 1984. He organised the purchase and installation of the Antares accelerator in 1988 at ANSTO.

Boldeman is best known for his contribution to the Australian Synchrotron located near Monash University in Melbourne. Heavily involved in the development of the project from initiation in the 90's, Boldeman became the Foundation Technical Director in 2001, and also principal advisor to the Victorian government for the Synchrotron. He co-designed and monitored the construction of the Australian Synchrotron. This included design of the lattice structure.

Boldeman received a lifetime contribution award for his work on the ANTARES Tandem Accelerator and the Australian Synchrotron.

Boldeman was elected a fellow of the Australian Academy of Technological Science and Engineering in 1993. He was made an Officer of the General Division of the Order of Australia in 2015 for services to Australian Science and Technology.

He is also co-founder and current vice-president of Gunnamatta youth weight training association in South Cronulla.
