= Arthur Bache Walkom =

Australian palaeobotanist and museum director

Arthur Bache Walkom (8 February 1889 – 2 July 1976) was an Australian palaeobotanist and museum director.

Walkom was born in Grafton, New South Wales and moved with his family to Sydney where he was educated at Petersham Public and Fort Street Model schools and the University of Sydney graduating with a D.Sc. in 1918. He worked under Professor (Sir) Edgeworth David as a junior demonstrator.

He was an Assistant Lecturer in palaeontology and stratigraphy at the University of Queensland from 1913 to 1919.

From 1939 to 1954 Walkom was the director of the Australian Museum. From 1947 to 1954 he served on the United Nations Educational, Scientific and Cultural Organization's Australian committee for museums. He was awarded the Clarke Medal by the Royal Society of New South Wales in 1948. A fossil conifer genus, Walkomiella, was named after him.

Awards
Preceded by Hubert Lyman Clark	Clarke Medal; 1948	Succeeded by Herman Rupp
