= Horatio George Anthony Wright =

Australian microscopist and surgeon

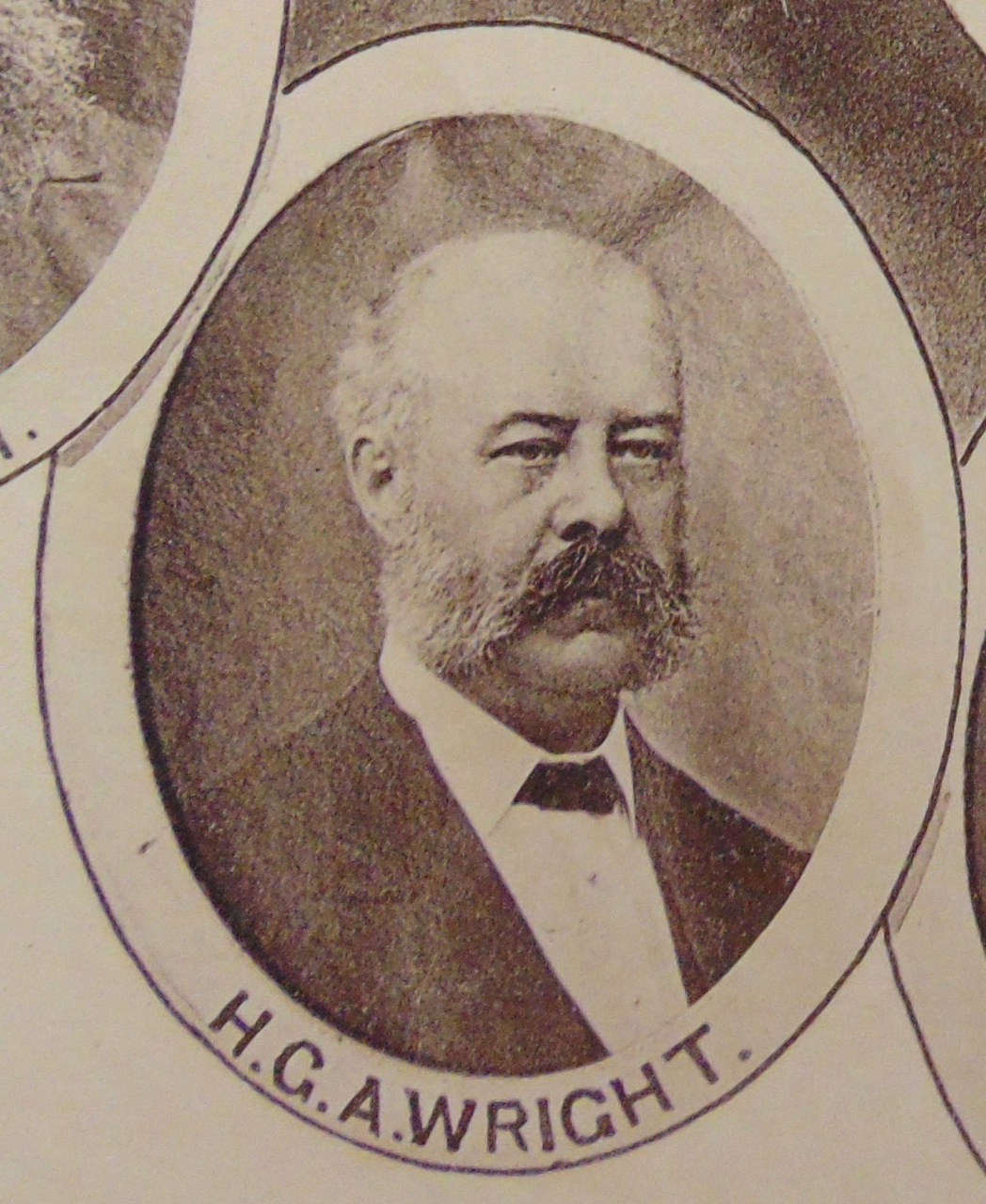

Horatio George Anthony Wright (1827 – 14 September 1901) was an Australian microscopist and surgeon. Wright was born in Maidstone, Kent, England and died in Sydney, New South Wales. In 1868 he attended the Prince Alfred, Duke of Edinburgh as a surgeon, after he was shot by Henry James O'Farrell.

== See also ==
- Henry Chamberlain Russell, colleague in astronomy
- Archibald Liversidge, colleague in astronomy
