= Charles Hedley =

Australian naturalist (1862–1926)

- Born: 27 February 1862; Masham, Yorkshire, England
- Died: 14 September 1926 (aged 64)
- Parent(s): Rev. Canon Thomas Hedley and Mary, née Bush
- Scientific career
- Fields: Conchology, malacology
- Institutions: Royal Society of Queensland (secretary)

Signature
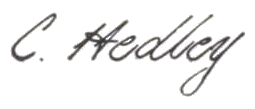

Charles Hedley (27 February 1862 – 14 September 1926) was a naturalist, specifically a malacologist. He was born in Britain, but he spent most of his life in Australia.

He was the winner of the 1925 Clarke Medal.

== Early life ==
Hedley was born in the vicarage at Masham, Yorkshire, England, the son of the Rev. Canon Thomas Hedley and his wife Mary, née Bush.

He was mainly educated in the south of France; from boyhood he collected mollusc shells, and was greatly influenced by a French work on molluscan anatomy.

== Bibliography ==
- Hedley C. 1892. Art. XVIII.—An Enumeration of the Janellidae. Transactions and Proceedings of the Royal Society of New Zealand, Volume 25, pages 156–162.
- 1896–1900 The atoll of Funafuti, Ellice group: its zoology, botany, ethnology, and general structure based on collections made by Mr. Charles Hedley, of the Australian museum, Sydney, N.S.W. Sydney. – Parts written by Charles Hedley include:
  - Hedley C. 1896. Part I. – I. General account of the atoll of Funafuti. 1–72.
  - Hedley C. 1897. Part IV. – XI. The Ethnology of Funafuti" and "The Mollusca of Funafuti. 227–306.
  - Hedley C. 1899. Part VII. – XVII. The Mollusca of Funafuti Part I. 395–488.
  - Hedley C. 1899. Part VIII. – XVIII. The Mollusca of Funafuti Part II. 489–511.
  - Hedley C. 1899. Part IX. – XVII. The Mollusca of Funafuti (Supplement). 547–570.
- Hedley C. 1905. Art. XVI.—Results of Dredging on the Continental Shelf of New Zealand. Webster, W. H., Volume 38, 68–76.
- Hedley C. 1911. Part I. Mollusca. Pages 1-8, plate 1. In: Murray J (ed.) 1911. Vol. II. Biology. British Antarctic Expedition, 1907-9, under the command of Sir E.H. Shackleton, c.v.o. Reports on the scientific investigations. London.
- Hedley C. (1915), Studies on Australian Mollusca. Part XII; Proceedings of the Linnean Society of New South Wales v. 39
- Hedley C. 1916. Part V. Report on Mollusca. From Elevated Marine Beds, "Raised Beaches," of McMurdo Sound. pages 85-88. In: Benson W. L. et al. 1916. Geology. Vol. II. British Antarctic Expedition, 1907–9, under the command of Sir E.H. Shackleton, c.v.o. Reports on the scientific investigations. London.
- Charles Hedley, A revision of the Australian Turridae; Records of the Australian Museum 13 (1922)

Awards
Preceded by Joseph Maiden	Clarke Medal; 1925	Succeeded by Andrew Gibb Maitland
