= Royal Society of New South Wales =

Academy of sciences

The Royal Society of New South Wales
- Motto: Omnia quaerite (Question everything)
- Founders: Sir Thomas Brisbane (President); Dr James Bowman; Dr Henry Douglass; Judge Barron Field; Major Frederick Goulburn; Captain Francis Irvine; Edward Wollstonecraft Esq
- Established: 1821 – as the Philosophical Society of Australasia; 1866 – Royal assent received from Queen Victoria and renamed as the Royal Society of New South Wales
- Focus: "... for the encouragement of studies and investigations in Science, Art, Literature and Philosophy ..."
- President: Dr Susan Pond
- Members: Up to 25 Distinguished Fellows; 400 Fellows and 200 Members
- Formerly called: The Philosophical Society of Australasia (1821-50); The Australian Philosophical Society (1850-56); The Philosophical Society of New South Wales (1856-66)
- Address: Sydney, Australia
- Website: www.royalsoc.org.au

The Royal Society of New South Wales is a learned society based in Sydney, Australia. The Governor of New South Wales is the vice-regal patron of the society. It is the oldest learned society in the Southern Hemisphere.

The society traces its origin to the Philosophical Society of Australasia established on 27 June 1821. In 1850, after a period of informal activity, the society was revived as the Australian Philosophical Society and, in 1856, the Philosophical Society of New South Wales. The society was granted Royal Assent on 12 December 1866 and at that time was renamed the Royal Society of New South Wales.

Membership is open to any person interested in the promotion of studies in science, art, literature and philosophy. Fellowship and Distinguished Fellowship are by election, and may be conferred on leaders in their fields. Fellowship and Distinguished Fellowship are honours gazetted under vice-regal authority by the governor of New South Wales, and marked by the post-nominals FRSN and DistFRSN. The society is based in Sydney and has active branches in Mittagong in the Southern Highlands, Bathurst in the Mid-West, and Newcastle in the Hunter Valley. Regular monthly meetings and public lectures are well attended by both members and visitors.

The society publishes a peer-reviewed journal, the Journal and Proceedings of the Royal Society of New South Wales, the second-oldest peer-reviewed publication in the Southern Hemisphere.

== History ==
The Royal Society of New South Wales traces its origins to the Philosophical Society of Australasia, established on 27 June 1821 and was the first scientific society in the then British Colony of New South Wales.

The society was formed "with a view to enquiring into the various branches of physical science of this vast continent and its adjacent regions". On his arrival in Sydney late in 1821, the newly appointed governor, Sir Thomas Brisbane, was offered and accepted the position of president.

Following a period of informal activity, the society was revitalised (led by Dr Henry Douglass, one of the original founders) and renamed the Australian Philosophical Society on 19 January 1850. The society was renamed the Philosophical Society of New South Wales in 1856. On 12 December 1866, Queen Victoria granted Royal Assent to change its name to The Royal Society of New South Wales. The society was incorporated by Act of the New South Wales Parliament in 1881.

The rules of the society provided that the governor of New South Wales should be president ex officio. After the establishment of the Commonwealth of Australia in 1901, the governor-general became patron of the society, and the governor of New South Wales the vice-patron. From 1938 to 2014, the society was under the joint patronage of the governor-general of Australia and the governor of NSW. The society now has a single vice-regal patron, the governor of NSW.

Throughout its history, the society has done much to foster local research particularly in science, through meetings, symposia, publications and international scientific exchange, and has supported and fostered the endeavours of other organisations dedicated to the furtherance of knowledge.

The society encourages "... studies and investigations in Science, Art, Literature and Philosophy, to promote and further the development of Science and its relationship with Art, Literature and Philosophy and their allied disciplines and applications, to facilitate the exchange of information and ideas amongst the Members and Fellows of the Society and others on these and kindred topics and to disseminate knowledge to the people of New South Wales and beyond ..." through the following activities:

- Publications of results of scientific investigations through its Journal and Proceedings;
- Awarding prizes and medals for outstanding achievements in research;
- Liaison with other similar bodies;
- Holding meetings for the benefit of members and the general public (special meetings are held for the Pollock Memorial Lecture in Physics and Mathematics, the Liversidge Research Lecture in Chemistry, the Poggendorf Memorial Lecture in Agriculture, the Clarke Memorial Lecture in Geology and the Warren Lecture and Prize in engineering, applied science and technology, and the Royal Society of NSW History and Philosophy of Science Medal); and
- Maintaining a library.

== Journal ==
The society's journal, the Journal and Proceedings of the Royal Society of New South Wales is one of the oldest peer-reviewed publications in the Southern Hemisphere. Much innovative research of the 19th and early 20th centuries (e.g. Lawrence Hargrave's work on flight) was first brought to the attention of the scientific world through the Journal and Proceedings of the Royal Society of New South Wales. In the last few decades specialist journals have become preferred for highly technical work but the Journal and Proceedings remains an important publication for multidisciplinary and transdisciplinary work.

The Journal and Proceedings are exchanged with hundreds of institutions worldwide. Issues are published June and December each year.

The society welcomes scholarly work to be considered for publication in the journal. Preference is given to work done in Australia which has relevance to New South Wales. Intending authors must read the style guide, available via the society's web site (Journal), before submitting their manuscript for review.

== Distinguished Fellows of the society ==
The society recognises outstanding contributions to science, art, literature or philosophy with the position of Distinguished Fellow. Distinguished Fellows of the society are entitled to use the postnominal Dist FRSN. There can be up to 25 Distinguished Fellows at any one time.

=== Current Distinguished Fellows of the society ===
Name	Discipline	Year	Contribution
Professor Michael Archer AM FAA Dist FRSN	Biology and paleobiology	2009	Professor Archer is a distinguished biologist and palaeobiologist. He was one of the key researchers involved in researching the Riversleigh fossil deposits found in Queensland, one of the richest deposits of fossils in the world.
The Hon. Dame Marie Bashir AD CVO Dist FRSN	Psychiatry and public service	2009	Dame Marie Bashir graduated in medicine and worked in clinical psychiatry and mental health services in Australia and Indochina. In 2001, she was appointed Governor of NSW. During her term as governor she was vice-regal patron of the society.
The Hon Emeritus Professor Peter Baume AC Dist FRSN	Medicine and public service	2015	Professor Baume served a senator for New South Wales for 16 years in a range of senior ministerial positions. He was head of the School of Community Medicine at the University of NSW and is a former chancellor of the Australian National University.
Professor Elizabeth Blackburn AC FAA FRS Dist FRSN	Biochemistry and Biophysics	2010	Professor Blackburn was awarded the Nobel Prize in Physiology or Medicine in 2010. She discovered the molecular nature of telomeres - the ends of eukaryotic chromosomes that serve as protective caps essential for preserving genetic information and the ribonucleoprotein enzyme telomerase.
Professor Robert Clark AO FAA Dist FRSN	Physics	2009	Professor Clark was Chief Defence Scientist at the Australian Defence Science and Technology Organisation. Previously he was Professor of Experimental Physics and was Director of the Centre of Excellence for Quantum Computer Technology at the University of New South Wales.
Professor Peter Doherty AC FAA FRS FRSE Dist FRSN	Immunology	2013	Professor Doherty won the 1996 Nobel Prize in Physiology or Medicine jointly with Rolf M. Zinkernagel. Their work discovered how T-cells recognise their targets and led to a much-improved understanding of the immune system recognises virus-infected cells.
Professor Barry Jones AO FAA FAHA FTSE FASSA Dist FRSN	Politician	2012	He was the longest serving Minister for Science from 1983 to 1990 and is the only person to have been elected as a Fellow of all four of Australia's learned Academies.
Thomas Keneally AO Dist FRSN	Historian	2017	An Australian Living National Treasure, author of many books including The Chant of Jimmy Blacksmith and Schindler's Ark
Professor Kurt Lambeck AO FRS FAA Dist FRSN	Geophysics, geology, and glaciology	2010	Professor Lambeck is internationally recognised as an expert on the interaction between ice sheets, oceans and the Earth and the impact of ocean levels resulting from climate change.
Emeritus Scientia Professor Eugenie Lumbers FAA Dist FRSN	Medicine	2010	Professor Lumbers is an internationally respected authority on foetal and maternal physiology. For many years she has worked in cardiovascular and renal physiology, with particular reference to blood pressure regulation in the renin-angiotensin system.
Professor Brian Schmidt AC FAA FRS Dist FRSN	Astronomy	2012	Awarded the 2011 Nobel Prize in Physics with Saul Perlmutter and Adam Riess for providing evidence that the expansion of the universe is accelerating.
Professor Michelle Simmons FAA Dist FRSN	Physics	2010	Professor Simmons is a Federation Fellow and Director of the Atomic Fabrication Facility at the University of NSW. Her research in nanoelectronics combines molecular beam epitaxy and scanning tunnelling microscopy to develop novel electronic devices at the atomic scale.
Professor Richard Stanton AO FAA Dist FRSN	Geology	2009	Professor Stanton is a distinguished geologist. He recognised the role of volcanism and sedimentation in the formation of new ore deposits, and the physics and chemistry involved in the concentration of copper, zinc and lead in volcanic lavas.
Professor Jill Trewhella FAAAS FLANL Dist FRSN	Mathematics, physics, chemistry	2011	Professor Trewhella gained an international recognition for her work at Los Alamos National Laboratory, in particular contributing to our understanding of the molecular communication that underpins healthy biological function.
Professor Bruce Warren FRCPath Dist FRSN	Medicine, pathology	2009	Professor Warren is a distinguished pathologist whose research interests concerned tumour biology and thrombosis.

=== Past Distinguished Fellows of the society ===
Name	Discipline	Year	Contribution
Professor Lord May of Oxford, OM AC Kt FRS FAA Dist FRSN (1936 - 2020)	Mathematics and zoology	2010	Lord May was one of Australia's most distinguished mathematicians. He had a key role in the application of chaos theory to theoretical ecology through the 1970s and 1980s. He was awarded the Copley Medal by the Royal Society (London) in 2007.
Professor Gavin Brown AO FAA Corr FRSE Dist FRSN (1942 - 2010)	Mathematics and education	2009	Professor Brown was a distinguished mathematician and educator. He was Inaugural Director of the Royal Institution of Australia after 12 years as Vice-Chancellor and Principal of the University of Sydney. His research areas were broad, including measure theory and algebraic geometry and his contributions both to education and mathematics have been recognised worldwide.
Professor David Craig AO FRS FAA Dist FRSN (1942 - 2015)	Chemistry	2009	Professor Craig's research work was in several fields but was especially pioneering in the then new and very difficult field of excitons in molecular crystals. He also did major work in the field of molecular quantum electrodynamics.
Professor Jak Kelly FInstP (London) FAIP Dist FRSN (1928 - 2012)	Physics	2009	Professor Kelly established an internationally renowned research centre on ion implantation and material defects at the University of New South Wales. He jointly invented a photovoltaic solar collector surface, which, at the time, was the world's most efficient and is now in mass production in China.
Emeritus Professor Noel Hush AO DSc FRS FNAS FAA FRACI Dist FRSN (1924 - 2019)	Computational and theoretical quantum chemistry	2010	Professor Hush was one of Australia's most distinguished and internationally renowned chemists with outstanding achievements in computational and theoretical quantum chemistry.

== Notable members ==
- Charles Anderson, mineralogist, paleontologist and president in 1924
- Louis Becke, writer
- John Blaxland, Army officer, historian and academic
- William Branwhite Clarke, geologist and long-time vice-president
- James Charles Cox, conchologist
- Lawrence Hargrave, a pioneer of manned flight and aeronautics
- William Stanley Jevons, one of the founders of microeconomics
- Philip Sydney Jones, surgeon, a member for 51 years
- Gerard Krefft, zoologist, palaeontologist, and Curator of the Australian Museum (1861-1874)
- Robert Hamilton Mathews, anthropologist and surveyor
- Eliezer Levi Montefiore (elected member 1875), first director of the Art Gallery of New South Wales
- William Scott, astronomer and clergyman
- Edward Wollstonecraft, a founding member of the original Philosophical Society of Australasia
- Horatio George Anthony Wright, microscopist and medical practitioner, honorary treasurer 1879–85 and 1893–1901, vice-president 1885–86 and 1891–92, chairman microscopy 1877–92

== Awards ==
The society makes a number of awards for meritorious contributions in the field of science.

The Clarke Medal is awarded by the society for distinguished work in the natural sciences. It was named in honour of the Reverend William Branwhite Clarke, one of the founders of the society. The medal was to be "awarded for meritorious contributions to Geology, Mineralogy and Natural History of Australasia, to be open to men of science, whether resident in Australasia or elsewhere". The Medal is now awarded annually for distinguished work in the natural sciences (geology, botany and zoology) done in the Australian Commonwealth and its territories. Each discipline is considered every three years. For a complete list of medalists see Clarke Medal.

The Edgeworth David Medal, established in 1942, is awarded for distinguished contributions by a young scientists under the age of thirty-five years for work done mainly in Australia or its territories or contributing to Australian science. It is named after the geologist, Sir Edgeworth David, FRS, who wrote the first comprehensive record of the geology of Australia.

The James Cook Medal, established in 1947, is awarded periodically for outstanding contributions to science and human welfare in and for the Southern Hemisphere.

== Presidents ==
From 1850 to 1880, the president of the society was the governor of New South Wales. In 1881, when the society was incorporated by an act of the New South Wales Parliament, the act provided that presidents of the society be elected by the members.

Year/Years	Name	Discipline	Notes
1821–2	Major General, Sir Thomas Brisbane GCB GCH	Astronomy	Governor NSW, Hon. President
1850–5	Hon. Sir Edward Deas-Thomson KCMG CB	Public Administration	Senior Vice-President. Clerk of both the Council of NSW and the Executive & Legislative Council
1855–7	Sir William Denison KCB	Engineering	Governor NSW, Hon. President
	Sir Charles Nicholson,1st Baronet of Luddenham	Medicine	Senior Vice-President
1858–60	Sir William Denison KCB	Engineering	Governor NSW, Hon. President
	Hon. Sir Edward Deas-Thomson KCMG CB	Public Administration	Senior Vice-President. Clerk of both the Council of NSW and the Executive & Legislative Council
1861–5	Sir John Young CB GCMG PC	Law	Governor NSW, Hon. President
	Rev. W.B. Clarke	Geology	Senior Vice-President
1866–7	Sir John Young GCB GCMG PC	Law	Governor NSW, Hon. President
	Rev. W.B. Clarke	Geology	Senior Vice-President
1868–71	4th Earl of Belmore Somerset Richard Lowry-Corry, 4th Earl Belmore, GCMG, PC (Ire)	Public Administration	Governor NSW, Hon. President
	Rev.W.B. Clarke	Geology	Senior Vice-President
1872–8	Sir Hercules Robinson GCMG PC	Public Administration	Governor NSW, Hon. President
	Rev. W.B. Clarke	Geology	Senior Vice-President
1879	Lord Augustus Loftus GCB PC	Diplomat	Governor NSW, Hon. President
	Hon. J. Smith	Physics	Senior Vice-President
1880	Hon. J. Smith	Physics	First elected President
1881	Henry C. Russell CMG	Astronomy	
1882	Christopher Rolleston CMG	Statistics	Auditor-General
1883	Professor J. Smith	Physics	Second elected term
1884	HenryC. Russell CMG	Astronomy	Second term
1885	Professor Archibald Liversidge	Chemistry	Joint Secretary 1875–1884;1886–1888
1886	Christopher Rolleston CMG	Statistics	Second term
1887	Charles S. Wilkinson	Geology	
1888	Sir Alfred Roberts	Medicine	
1889	Professor Archibald Liversidge	Chemistry	Second term
1890	Dr A. Leibius	Chemistry	Joint Secretary 1875–1885
1891	Henry C. Russell CMG	Astronomy	Third term
1892	Professor William H. Warren	Engineering	Joint Secretary 1889–1891
1893	Professor, Sir Thomas P. Anderson Stuart	Physiology	Joint Secretary 1892
1894	Professor, Sir Richard Threlfall GBE	Physics	
1895	Professor, Sir Tannatt W.E. David KBE CMG DSO	Geology	Joint Secretary 1893–4
1896	Joseph H. Maiden ISO	Botany	Joint Secretary 1893–5; 1897–1913
1897	Henry Deane	Engineering	
1898	Sir George H. Knibbs CMG	Mathematics	Joint Secretary 1896–7; 1899–1906
1899	William Mogford Hamlet	Chemistry	
1900	Professor Archibald Liversidge	Chemistry	Third term
1901	Henry C. Russell CMG	Astronomy	Fourth term
1902	Professor William H. Warren	Engineering	Second term
1903	Frederick B. Guthrie ISO	Chemistry	Joint Secretary 1907–1911
1904	Charles O. Burge	Engineering	
1905	Henry A. Lenehan	Astronomy	
1906	Professor, Sir Thomas P. Anderson Stuart	Physiology	Second term
1907	Henry Deane	Engineering	Second term
1908	William Mogford Hamlet	Chemistry	Second term
1909	H.D. Walsh	Engineering	
1910	Professor, Sir Tannatt W.E. David KBE CMG DSO	Geology	Second term
1911	Joseph H. Maiden ISO	Botany	Second term
1912	Richard H. Cambage CBE	Surveying	Joint Secretary 1914–1922; 1925–7
1913	Henry G. Smith	Chemistry	
1914	Charles Hedley	Zoology	
1915	R. Greig-Smith	Bacteriology	Joint Secretary 1925–6
1916	T.H. Houghton	Engineering	
1917	Dr, Sir John B. Cleland CBE	Microbiology	
1918	William Sutherland Dun	Palaeontology	
1919	Professor C.E. Fawsitt	Chemistry	
1920	J. Nangle	Astronomy	
1921	Ernest C. Andrews	Geology	
1922	Adolph Carl Sussmilch	Geology	Joint Secretary 1928–1933; 1936–7
1923	Richard H. Cambage CBE	Surveying	Second term
1924	Dr Charles Anderson	Mineralogy	Joint Secretary 1935–1942
1925	Professor R.D. Watt	Agriculture	
1926	Dr Walter George Woolnough	Geology	
1927	Prof. J. Douglas Stewart	Veterinary Medicine	
1928	W. Poole	Engineering	
1929	Professor L.A. Cotton	Geology	
1930	Professor O.U. Vonwiller	Physics	Joint Secretary 1927–8; 1948
1931	Edwin Cheel	Botany	
1932	Asst. Prof. William R. Browne	Geology	
1933	R.W. Challoner	Chemistry	
1934	Dr R.J. Noble	Agriculture	Joint Secretary 1933
1935	A.R. Penfold	Chemistry	
1936	Major E.H. Booth	Physics	Joint Secretary 1934–6
1937	Dr Walter L. Waterhouse MC	Botany	
1938	Professor J.C. Earl	Chemistry	
1939	Dr H.S.H. Wardlaw	Biochemistry	
1940	Professor, Rev Adolphus P. Elkin CMG	Anthropology	Joint Secretary 1938–9; 1941–5
1941	David P. Mellor	Chemistry	Joint Secretary 1943–7
1942	Professor Henry Priestley	Biochemistry	
1943	Dr Arthur B. Walkom	Palaeobotany	
1944	Dr G.D. Osborne	Geology	Joint Secretary 1953
1945	Dr A. Bolliger	Medicine	
1946	Dr F. Lions	Chemistry	
1947	Dr J.A. Dulhunty	Geology	
1948	Dr Ronald Aston	Engineering	
1949	Harley Wood	Astronomy	Joint Secretary 1948; 1951; 1958–1960
1950	F.R. Morrison	Chemistry	Joint Secretary 1946–7
1951	Dr R.C.L. Bosworth	Chemistry	Secretary 1948–50
1952	Dr C.J. Magee	Agriculture	
1953	Dr Ida A. Browne	Palaeontology	First female president; joint secretary 1950–2; 1957–8
1954	Dr, Sir Ronald S. Nyholm	Chemistry	
1955	Dr Max R. Lemberg	Biochemistry	
1956	F.D. McCarthy	Anthropology	
1957	F.N. Hanlon	Geology	Joint Secretary 1954–6
1958	J.L. Griffith	Mathematics	Secretary 1955–7; 1966–8
1959	A.F.A. Harper	Physics	
1960	H.A.J. Donegan	Chemistry	
1961	R.J.W. LeFevre	Chemistry	
1962	W.B. Smith-White	Mathematics	
1963	Howard McKern	Chemist	
1964	J.W. Humphries	Physics	
1965	Dr A.A. Day	Geology	Joint Secretary 1959–1960
1966	A.H. Voisey	Geology	
1967	Angus Henry Low	Mathematics	Secretary 1963–5
1968	A. Keane	Mathematics	
1969	J.W.G. Neuhaus	Chemistry	
1970	W.E. Smith	Mathematics	
1971	M.J. Puttock	Metrologist	
1972	J.C. Cameron	Geology	Secretary 1969
1973	J.P. Pollard	Mathematics/Statistics	
1974	J.W. Pickett	Palaeontology	
1975	E.K. Chaffer	Geology	Secretary 1970–1
1976	D.J. Swaine	Chemistry	Secretary 1986–8
1977	W.H. Robertson	Astronomy	
1978	F.C. Beavis	Geology	
1979	D.H. Napper	Chemistry	
1980	G.S. Gibbons	Geology	
1981	B.A. Warren	Pathology	
1982	T.W. Cole	Engineering	
1983	R.S. Vagg	Chemistry	
1984	R.S. Bhathal	Astronomy	Secretary 1989–91
1985	J.H. Loxton	Mathematics	
1986	M.A. Stubbs-Race	Engineering	
1987	F.L. Sutherland	Geology	First of two terms
1988	D.E. Winch	Mathematics	
1989	H.S. Hancock	Geology	
1990	G.W.K. Ford	Nuclear Science	Secretary 1993–
1991	E.C. Potter	Chemistry	First of two terms
1992	F.L. Sutherland	Geology	Second term
1993	R.A.L. Osborne	Geology	
1994	J.R. Hardie	Geology/Education	Secretary 1992 — First of six terms
1995	Dr D.F. Branagan	Geology	
1996	K.L. Grose	Ancient History	
1997	E.C. Potter	Chemistry	Second term
1998	D.J. O'Connor	Physics	
1999	A.T. Baker	Chemistry	
2000	P.A. Williams	Geology	
2001–2	D.A. Craddock	Aeronautics	Two terms
2003–4	K. Kelly	Science Journalism	Two terms
2005–6	Prof. J.C. Kelly	Physics	Two terms
2007–11	J.R. Hardie	Geology/Education	Second to sixth terms
2012–16	Dr Donald Hector AM FRSN	Engineering	Editor of Journal & Proceedings 2011–2012
2016–17	Em. Prof D. Brynn Hibbert AM FRSN	Analytical Chemistry	Vice President 2014–2015
2018–	Prof Ian H. Sloan AO FRSN	Mathematics	Vice President 2017–2018
2021–	Dr Susan M. Pond AM FRSN	Medicine	Vice President 2019–2021
