= Royal Society of Western Australia =

Science organization in Western Australia

The Royal Society of Western Australia (RSWA) promotes science in Western Australia.

The RSWA was founded in 1914, and also gained the Royal name in the same year. It publishes the Journal of the Royal Society of Western Australia, and has awarded the Medal of the Royal Society of Western Australia (also known incorrectly as the Kelvin Medal) on an occasional basis since 1924.

== Journal ==
The Journal of the Royal Society of Western Australia is a quarterly peer-reviewed scientific journal covering scientific research carried out in Western Australia and topics related to Western Australia. It is the official journal of the society and traces its roots to the Journal and Proceedings of the Mueller Botanic Society of Western Australia published from 1899 to 1903. The Mueller Botanic Society became the West Australian Natural History Society in 1903, and from 1904 to 1909, the journal was published as Journal of the West Australian Natural History Society. In 1909 the society again changed its name, becoming the Natural History and Science Society of Western Australia, and its journal was subsequently published as Journal of the Natural History and Science Society of Western Australia until 1914. In that year, the Royal Society of Western Australia was established, and the journal obtained its present name.

== Awards ==
- RWSA Medal or Kelvin Gold Medal
- Doug Clarke Medal
- Student Medal
- Prizes

== History ==
The Mueller Botanic Society was presided over by E. J. Bickford and Frank Tratman from its foundation in 1897. It was later to join with the West Australian Natural History Society, and renamed the Natural History and Science Society of Western Australia.

The first president of the Royal Society was William John Dakin, serving until his replacement in 1915 by Andrew Gibb Maitland. Past presidents have included the palaeontologist Duncan Merrilees (1966–1967). Sylvia Hallam was the first woman president (1985–1986).

== Publications ==
- Journal and Proceedings (1915–1924)
- Journal (1924-current)
