= Henry Chamberlain Russell =

Australian astronomer and meteorologist

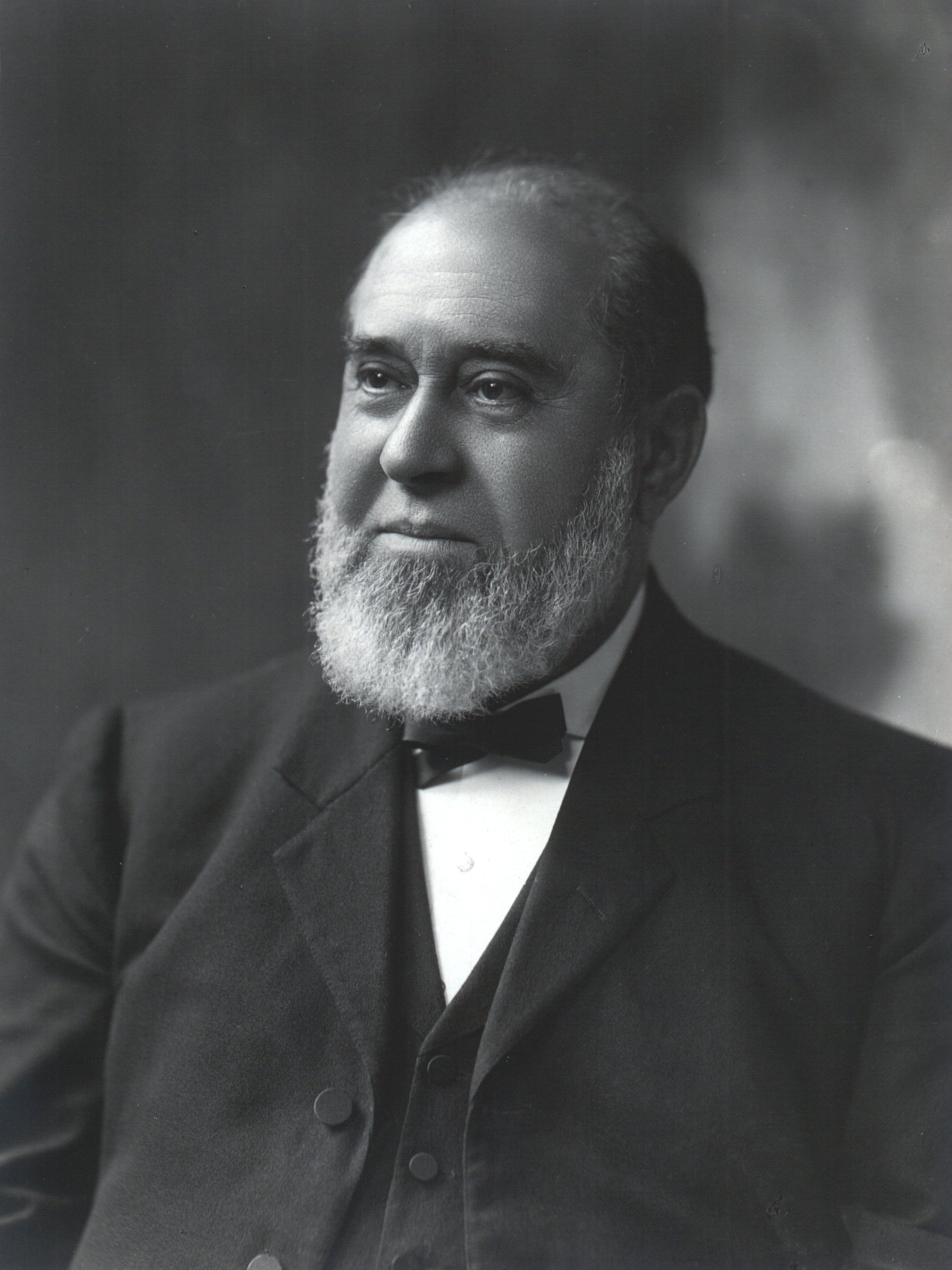
Portrait of Henry Chamberlaine Russell

Henry Chamberlain Russell CMG FRS (17 March 1836 – 22 February 1907) was an Australian astronomer and meteorologist.

His father was Bourn Russell, master mariner, businessman and politician.
