= Ulmus glaucescens var. lasiocarpa =

Scientific classification
- Kingdom: Plantae
- Clade: Embryophytes
- Clade: Tracheophytes
- Clade: Spermatophytes
- Clade: Angiosperms
- Clade: Eudicots
- Clade: Rosids
- Order: Rosales
- Family: Ulmaceae
- Genus: Ulmus
- Species: U. glaucescens
- Variety: U. g. var. lasiocarpa

Trinomial name
- Ulmus glaucescens var. lasiocarpa Rehder

Variety of tree

Ulmus glaucescens var. lasiocarpa Rehder, named the hairy-fruited glaucescent elm in the United States, is a Chinese tree found along rivers and mountain slopes at elevations of 2500–2600 m in the provinces of Hebei, Henan, Liaoning, Nei Mongol, Ningxia, eastern Qinghai, and Shanxi.

== Description ==
The variety is distinguished by a "samara densely pubescent when young, with scattered hairs when mature. Fl. and fr. March–May.".

== Pests and diseases ==
No information

== Cultivation ==
There are no known cultivars of this taxon, nor is it known to be in commerce.

== Accessions ==
=== Australasia ===
- Mount Lofty Botanic Garden, Piccadilly, Australia. One tree, raised from seed sent by the Beijing Botanical Garden, planted out c. 1984, 4.5 m high, d.b.h. 13 cm in 2008.
