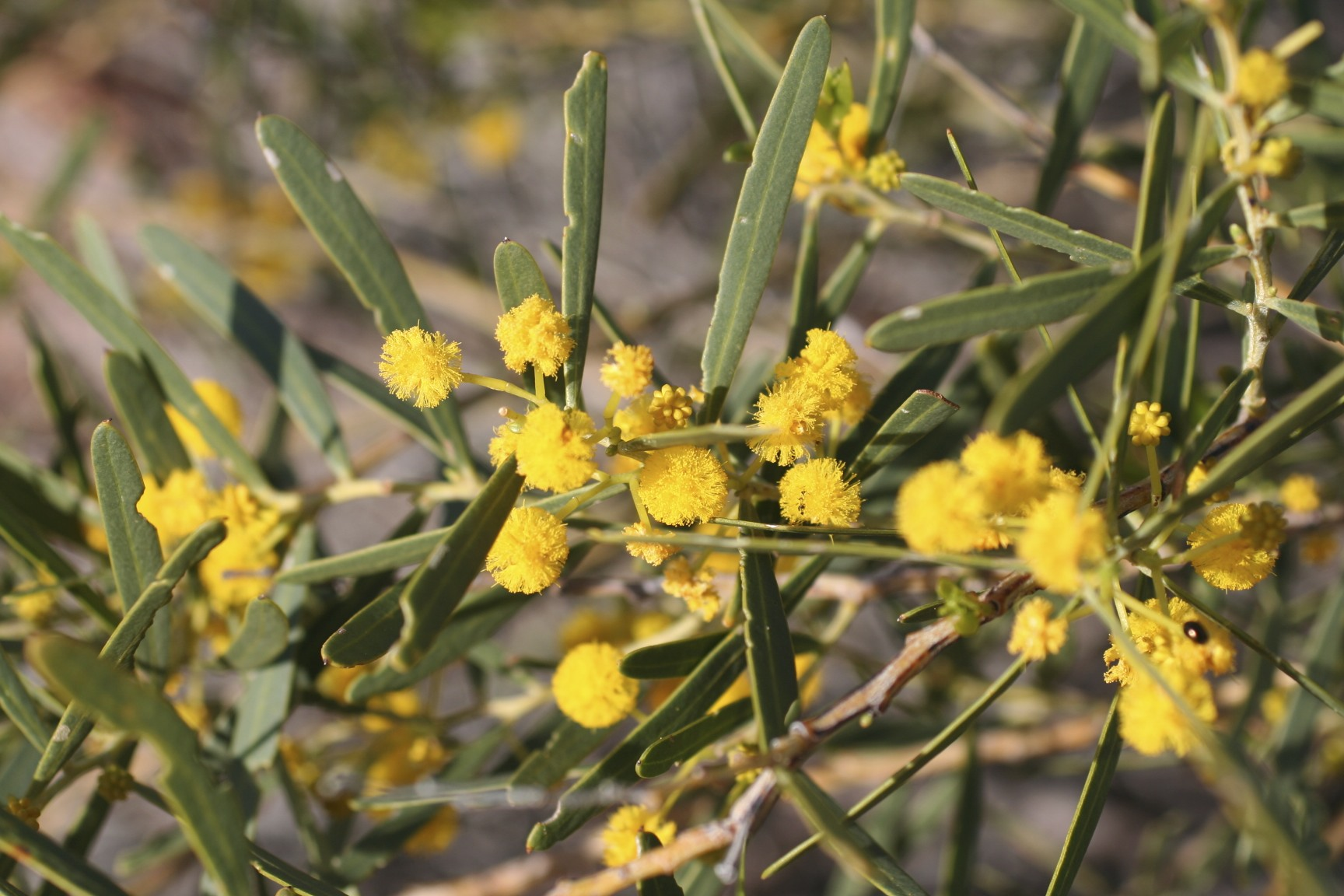

Conservation status
- Priority Two — Poorly Known Taxa (DEC)

Scientific classification
- Kingdom: Plantae
- Clade: Tracheophytes
- Clade: Angiosperms
- Clade: Eudicots
- Clade: Rosids
- Order: Fabales
- Family: Fabaceae
- Subfamily: Caesalpinioideae
- Clade: Mimosoid clade
- Genus: Acacia
- Species: A. gelasina

Binomial name
- Acacia gelasina Maslin
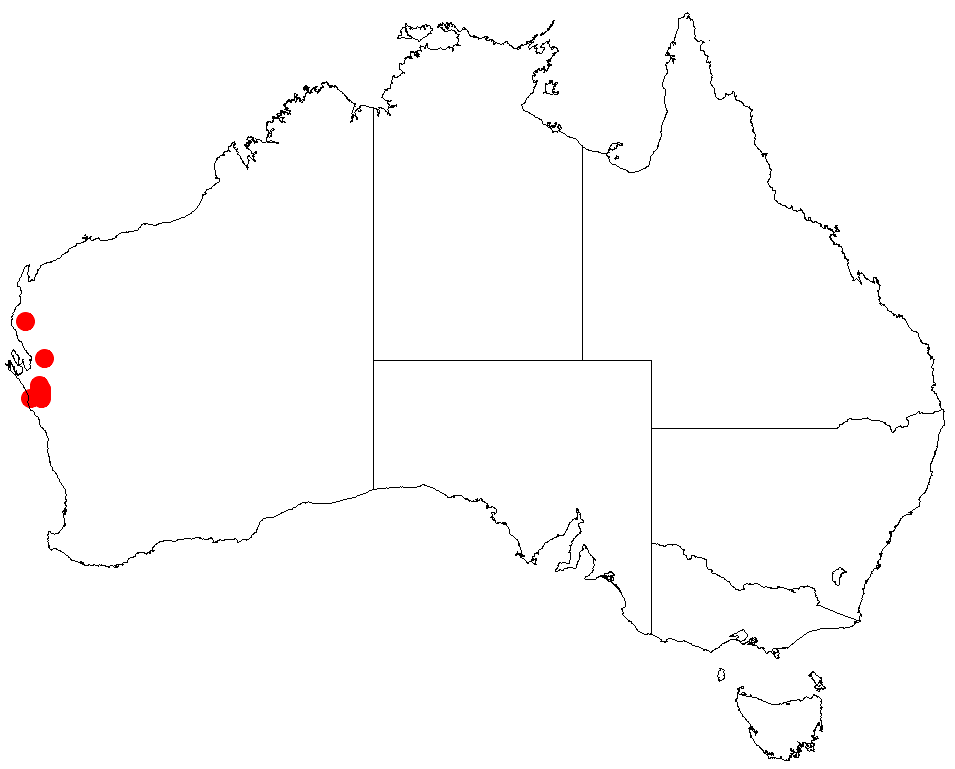
- Occurrence data from AVH

Synonyms
- Racosperma gelasinum (Maslin) Pedley

= Acacia gelasina =

Species of legume

Acacia gelasina is a species of flowering plant in the family Fabaceae and is endemic to the west of Western Australia. It is a dense, spreading, glabrous shrub with erect, lance-shaped phyllodes with the narrower end towards the base, spherical heads of pale yellow flowers and firmly papery to thinly leathery pods, rounded over the seeds.

== Description ==
Acacia gelasina is a dense, spreading, glabrous shrub that typically grows to a height of 1–2.5 m (3 ft 3 in – 8 ft 2 in). Its phyllodes are erect, lance-shaped with the narrower end towards the base, 40–100 mm (1.6–3.9 in) long, 3–8 mm (0.12–0.31 in) wide, thickly leathery and slightly rigid. The flowers are borne in up to six spherical heads in racemes 2–20 mm (0.079–0.787 in) long on peduncles 10–20 mm (0.39–0.79 in) long, each head with 35 to 50 pale yellow flowers. Flowering occurs from June to September, and the pods are narrowly oblong, up to 150 mm (5.9 in) long, 12–14 mm (0.47–0.55 in) wide, flat, firmly papery to thinly leathery, rounded over the seeds and slightly constricted between them. The seeds are round to broadly elliptic of broadly egg-shaped, somewhat flattened, dark brown to blackish and lack an aril.

== Taxonomy ==
Acacia gelasina was first formally described in 1995 by Bruce Maslin from specimens collected by Alison Marjorie Ashby 46.5 km (28.9 mi) north of the Murchison River near the North West Coastal Highway in 1972. The specific epithet (gelasina) means 'a dimple', "referring to the shallow, circular depression on the lateral faces of the seeds".

== Distribution and habitat ==
This species of wattle grows in yellow sand in closed scrub in the Coolgardie, Geraldton Sandplains and Yalgoo bioregions in the west of Western Australia.

== Conservation status ==
Acacia gelasina is listed as "Priority Two" by the Western Australian Government Department of Biodiversity, Conservation and Attractions, meaning that it is poorly known and from only one or a few locations.

== See also ==
- List of Acacia species
