= SPATA31H1 =

Protein-coding gene in the species Homo sapiens

Identifiers
- Aliases: SPATA31H1, chromosome 2 open reading frame 16, C2orf16, SPATA31 Subfamily H Member 1, Spermatogenesis-Associated Protein 31H1
- External IDs: HomoloGene: 82476; GeneCards: SPATA31H1; OMA:SPATA31H1 - orthologs

Gene location (Human)
Chr.	Chromosome 2 (human)
Band	2p23.3	Start	27,537,386 bp
Band	2p23.3	End	27,582,720 bp
RNA expression pattern
Bgee	Human / Mouse (ortholog); Top expressed in: sperm; right testis; left testis; stromal cell of endometrium; muscle tissue; ganglionic eminence; islet of Langerhans; ventricular zone; right lobe of liver; right adrenal cortex / n/a; More reference expression data
BioGPS	n/a
Orthologs
Species	Human	Mouse
Entrez	84226	102635566
Ensembl	ENSG00000221843	n/a
UniProt	Q68DN1	n/a
RefSeq (mRNA)	NM_032266	XM_017321194
RefSeq (protein)	NP_115642	n/a
Location (UCSC)	Chr 2: 27.54 – 27.58 Mb	n/a
PubMed search
- Wikidata
View/Edit Human	View/Edit Mouse

Spermatogenesis-associated protein 31H1 is a protein which in humans is encoded by the gene SPATA31H1 (previously C2orf16) Not much has been reported about the function of the this protein, though it is found in the extracellular exosome and nucleus.

68 orthologs are known for this gene, including in mice and sheep, but no paralogs have been found.

== Gene ==
The C2orf16 isoform 2 is a 6.2 kb, 1 exon gene at locus 2p23.3, and contains P-S-E-R-S-H-H-S repeats on the C-terminal side of the gene from amino acid 1,559 to 1,903. These repeats appear to have arisen from a transposable element. Primates show more P-S-E-R-S-H-H-S repeats than other mammalian orthologs do.

=== Expression ===
C2orf16 is found to be highly expressed in the testes and a retinoic acid and mitogen-treated human embryonic stem cell line, but is not known to be expressed differently in age or disease phenotypes. C2orf16 is also seen to have high expression in the pre-implantation embryo from the 4-cell embryo stage to the blastocyst stage.

C2orf16 is not seen to have rapamycin sensitive expression. C2orf16 is also seen to significantly increase expression in c-MYC knockdown breast cancer cells.

== mRNA ==
=== Isoforms ===
Two isoforms exist of C2orf16. Isoform 1 is 5,388 amino acids long encoded in 5 exons over 16,401 base pairs. Isoform 2 uses an alternate start site of transcription and is considerably shorter at 1,984 amino acids long encoded in 1 exon over 6,200 base pairs.

=== Expression Regulation ===
One miRNA is predicted to bind to the 3'UTR of C2orf16, accession number MI0005564.

== Protein ==
C2orf16 has a predicted molecular weight of 224kD and a predicted isoelectric point of 10.08, values that are relatively constant between orthologs. The protein includes higher than average composition of serine, histidine, and arginine and a lower than average composition of alanine.

=== Compositional Features ===
A positive charge cluster is found from amino acid residues 1,274 to 1,302.

An arginine rich region is found from amino acids 1,545 to 1,933, a serine rich region is found from amino acids 1,568 to 1,934, and a histidine rich region is found from amino acids 1,630 to 1,853.

A dot matrix analysis reveals a heavily repeated region from approximately residue 1,500 to 1,984, this being the P-S-E-R-S-H-H-S repeat. a small band of dots at approximately amino acid 1,200 denotes a half repeat of the P-S-E-R-S-H-H-S sequence.

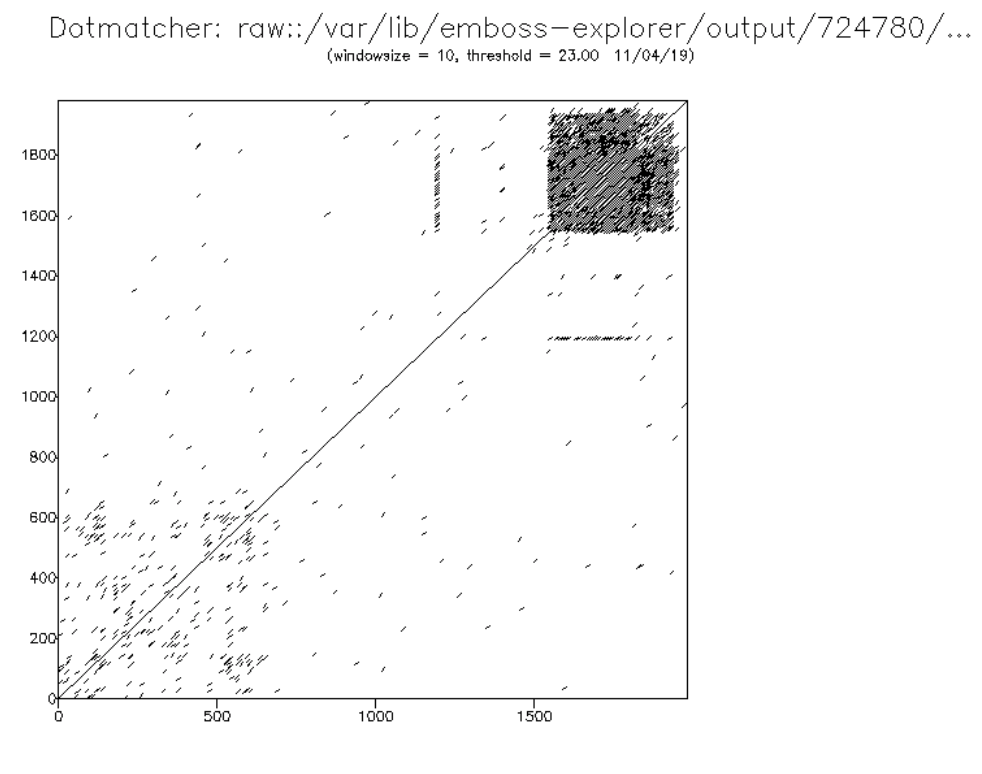
Dot matrix analysis of uncharacterized protein C2orf16 isoform 2. The P-S-E-R-S-H-H-S repeat sequence is visualized via the darker area of the matrix from amino acid 1500–1984, and a half P-S-E-R-S-H-H-S repeat sequence is seen as a band near amino acid 1200.

C2orf16 isoform 2 has no transmembrane domains, and is predicted to be localized to the nucleus after translation due to two nuclear localization sequences predicted at residues 1,233 and 1,281. No nuclear export sequence is conserved amongst orthologs, suggesting C2orf16 is not meant to leave the nucleus after import. No N- or C- terminal modifications were predicted.

=== Sub-cellular Localization ===
C2orf16 is predicted to be localized to the nucleus after transcription.

=== Structure ===
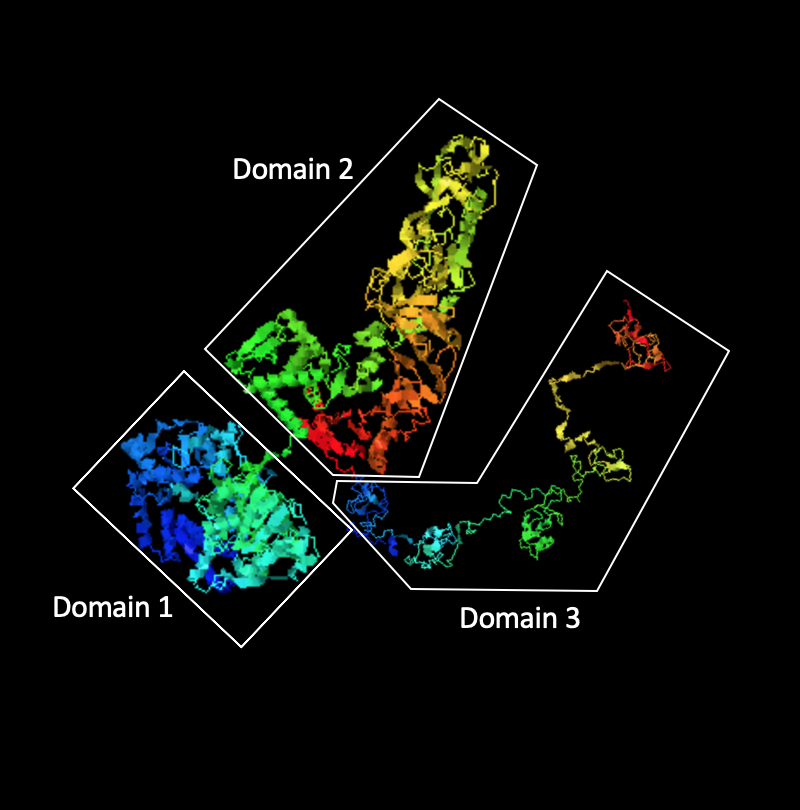
C2orf16 Isoform 2 predicted 3D structure showing the three major domains of the protein. Domain 3 contains the P-S-E-R-S-H-H-S repeat sequence.

The 3D structure of C2orf16 is predicted to have three major domains. Domain 1 is from amino acids 1 to 662, domain 2 is from amino acids 674 to 1,487, and domain 3 is from amino acids 1,488 to 1,984. Domain 1 and 2 are predicted to be connected via a stretch of 12 amino acids not otherwise organized into a secondary structure allowing flexibility between domains 1 and 2. Domain 2 is predicted to have protein interacting domains for transcription factors. Domain 3 is predicted to follow a "balls on a string" structure and has many sites for possible phosphorylation.

=== Protein Interactions ===
C2orf16 has been shown to have a physical interaction with proto-oncogene Myc by tandem affinity purification.

=== Ortholog Phylogeny ===
68 orthologs are known for C2orf16. The protein seems to have appeared in the mammalian evolutionary history 320 million years ago, around the divergence of mammals from reptiles. This history would explain why orthologs do not exist in amphibians, reptiles, birds, nor other more distantly related species.

Any orthologs from species more distant from humans than other mammals are likely not related in function, however, the P-S-E-R-S-H-H-S repeat is present in bony fishes, crustaceans, stramenopiles including potato blight, plantae, and prokaryotes.

The transposon repeat may have been reintroduced to mammals by a viral vector.

=== Repeat Sequence ===
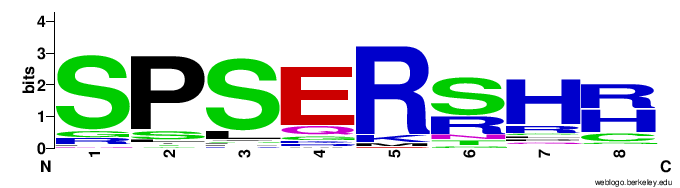
P-S-E-R-S-H-H-S Repeat Sequence Logo

The P-S-E-R-S-H-H-S repeat sequence is seen to be conserved in orthologs for C2orf16, and is conserved in organisms as distantly related as oomycete slime mold and plants including the chloroplasts of Ashby's Wattle. The S-P-S-E-R portion of the repeat is seen to be the most important for conservation, as seen by alignment with these orthologs and by creation of a Logo.

The conservation analysis of the repeat shows the initial S-P-S is highly conserved, possibly for phosphorylation(S) and structure(P), and the R is almost completely conserved, mutating to a Lysine in some orthologs, implying the positive charge is necessary for the purpose of the repeat.

The 3D shape of the repeat sequence is unclear as it has been predicted to be either balls-on-a-string or an antiparallel beta-sheet structure.

== Function ==
C2orf16 isoform 2 is predicted to have a possible function in mitosis regulation through its nuclear localization, predicted transcription factor binding site, physical association with Myc, and increased expression in c-MYC knockdown breast cancer cells.

== Clinical Significance ==
There are four patents on record for C2orf16, one each involving: cancerous PPP2RIA and ARID1A mutations, Alzheimer's predisposition, viral vaccine diversity, and copy number variation relation to common variable immunodeficiency. C2orf16 is also shown to have increased expression in some breast cancer lines, as well as being involved with Myc which is a common oncogene, making C2orf16 a possible oncogene to target in cancer treatments.
