= Scaevola collina =

Scientific classification
- Kingdom: Plantae
- Clade: Embryophytes
- Clade: Tracheophytes
- Clade: Spermatophytes
- Clade: Angiosperms
- Clade: Eudicots
- Clade: Asterids
- Order: Asterales
- Family: Goodeniaceae
- Genus: Scaevola
- Species: S. collina

Binomial name
- Scaevola collina J.M.Black ex E.L.Robertson

Species of plant

Scaevola collina, is a species of flowering plant in the family Goodeniaceae. It is a small sub-shrub with blue to purplish flowers. It grows in South Australia.

== Description ==
Scaevola collina is an upright sub-shrub up to 70 cm (28 in) high with small glandular hairs on new growth, occasionally smooth. The stems are upright to ascending, needle-shaped, woody, smooth or with short, soft hairs. The leaves sessile, variable from narrowly oblong to narrowly elliptic, lance-shaped or oval to egg-shaped, margins smooth or toothed, 12–43 mm (0.47–1.69 in) long, 3–15 mm (0.12–0.59 in) wide, pointed or rounded. The flowers are borne on terminal spikes up to 15 cm (5.9 in) long, corolla 16–24 mm (0.63–0.94 in) long, flattened hairs on the outside, bearded on the inside, wings about 1 mm (0.039 in) wide. The bracts are leaf-like, bracteoles narrowly egg-shaped and 0.8–11 mm (0.031–0.433 in) long. Flowering occurs from April to October and the fruit is cylindrical to oval-shaped, wrinkled, slightly hairy and 2–4 mm (0.079–0.157 in) long.

== Taxonomy and naming ==
Scaevola collina was first formally described in 1957 by Enid Lucy Robertson from an unpublished description by John McConnell Black and the description was published in Flora of South Australia. The specific epithet (collina) means "living on hills".

== Distribution and habitat ==
This scaevola grows in the Musgrave Ranges and Tomkinson Ranges in scrub and woodland on rocky locations.
