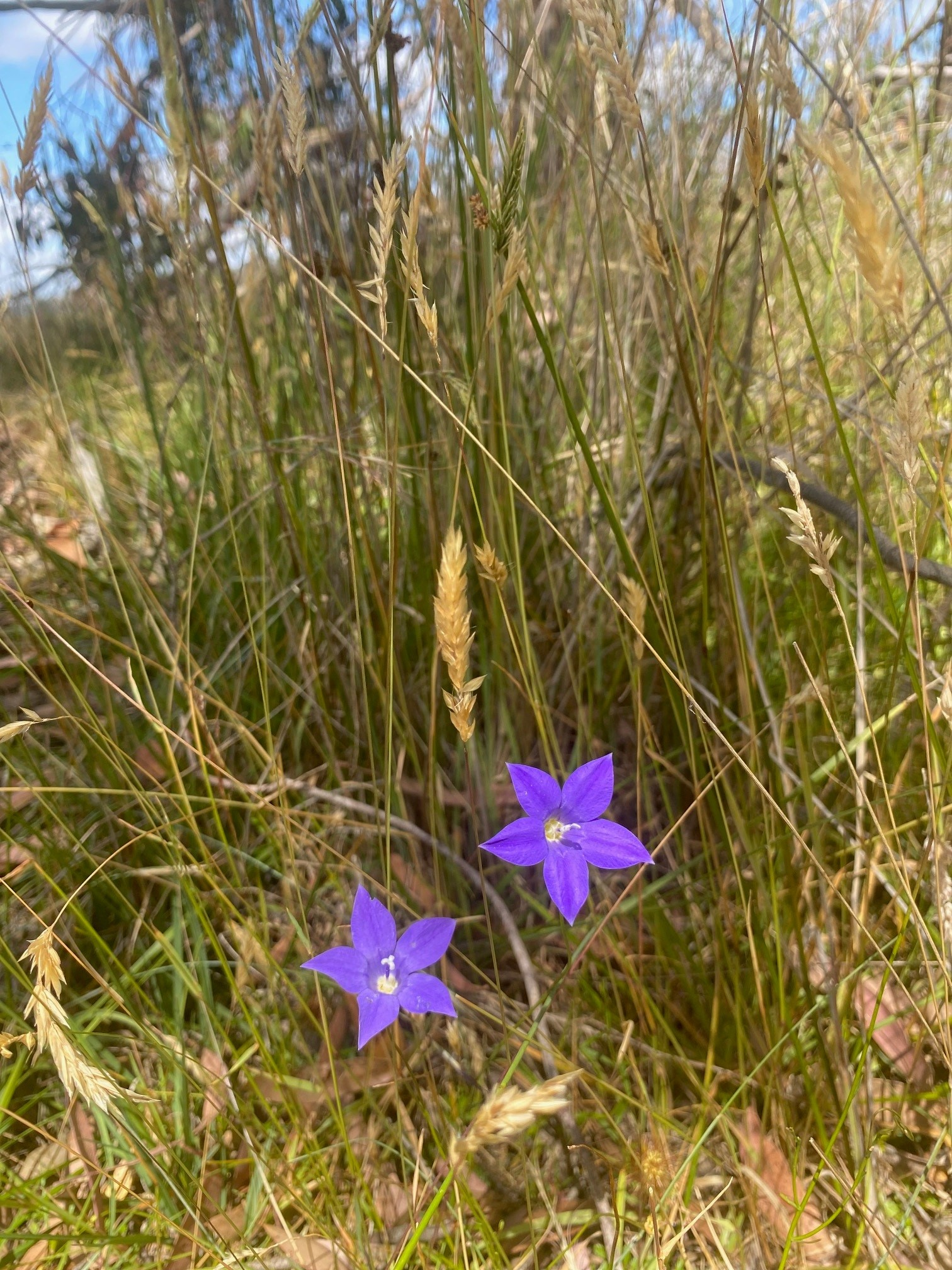
- Wahlenbergia gymnoclada at Lake Crescent (Tasmania)

Scientific classification
- Kingdom: Plantae
- Clade: Tracheophytes
- Clade: Angiosperms
- Clade: Eudicots
- Clade: Asterids
- Order: Asterales
- Family: Campanulaceae
- Genus: Wahlenbergia
- Species: W. gymnoclada

Binomial name
- Wahlenbergia gymnoclada Loth. (1947)

= Wahlenbergia gymnoclada =

Species of plant

Wahlenbergia gymnoclada, commonly known as the naked bluebell, is a species of plant of the family Campanulaceae and is native to Australia. It is one of 200 species, in the Wahlenbergia genus. Of these species, 26 occur in Australia, including one introduced, and Tasmania has seven species of native Wahlenbergia. Species in this genus are “all slender perennial herbs and most species occur in grassy vegetation, although one (W. saxicola) occurs in rocky alpine areas. “The slender pedicels with delicate blue (rarely white), symmetrical, flowers make this a relatively distinctive genus. The corolla tube is bell shaped, often with more or less spreading lobes”.

== Appearance and ecology ==
W. gymnoclada is a “perennial herb with a thickened taproot and spreading rhizomes ending in single stems”. These stems are 10–60 cm (3.9–23.6 in) long, erect or ascending, usually unbranched or with only 1-2 branches. They are usually glabrous, sometimes a few scattered hairs on lower stem.

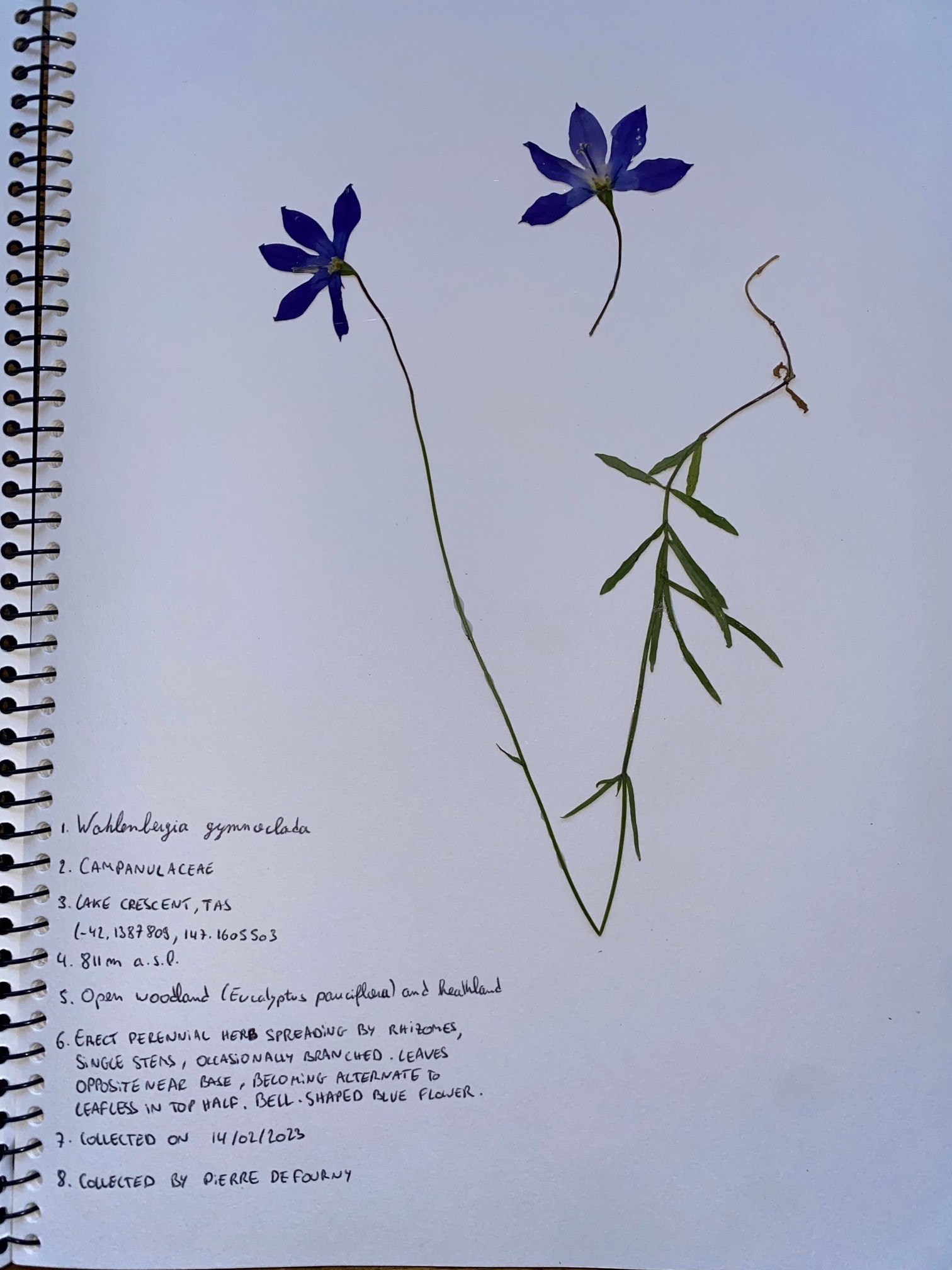
Pressed Wahlenbergia gymnoclada

=== Leaves ===
“The basal leaves are sessile and opposite”, “becoming alternate above, linear, sometimes lowermost oblanceolate, obtuse to acute at base of stem, becoming subulate above, sessile, 5–50 mm (0.20–1.97 in) long, 1–3.5 mm (0.039–0.138 in) wide”. The leaves are “usually glabrous, sometimes a few scattered hairs on lower leaves; margins flat, entire or with small, distant callus-teeth”.

=== Flowers ===
W. gymnoclada flowers from spring to summer, and September to March. It is large, blue and bell-shaped, terminal flower. The five petals are three times longer, 7–16 mm (0.28–0.63 in) than the tube 3–6 mm (0.12–0.24 in) long. They are elliptic and acute and 4-7mm wide Flowers are mainly solitary, “or 2-3 per stem, rarely more; pedicels 5–20 cm (2.0–7.9 in) long, glabrous; bracteoles linear, 2-12 mm long, glabrous”. The flower has five glabrous sepals that are 2–6 mm (0.079–0.236 in) long and narrowly triangular. Its five stamens are 1.4–3.0 mm (0.055–0.118 in) long and white. Their “upper section is filiform and lower section trullate to obtrullate, with extended shoulders, ciliate on upper margins”.

=== Fruit ===
The fruit is a round, obconic to elongated-obconic capsule, 5–9 mm (0.20–0.35 in) long, 2–4 mm (0.079–0.157 in) wide, and glabrous. The seeds are approximately 0.7 mm (0.028 in) long.

=== Distinguishing features ===
“The long, linear, opposite and glabrous lower leaves of W. gymnoclada readily distinguish this species from others of the same growth-form”. Other distinguishing features include “its rhizomatous habit; unbranched or seldom-branched stems and inflorescence; long pedicels; and large, shortly campanulate corollas”.

=== Habitat and distribution ===
Wahlenbergia gymnoclada is a reasonably common herb found in open Eucalyptus forest and woodlands, coastal scrub and heath, cleared pasture and swamp margins. W gymnoclada is “typically found in open sites, including disturbed sites”, in well-drained gravelly soil, and has been “recorded at altitudes from sea level to c. 50 m (160 ft) above sea level”. W. gymnoclada is widespread in Tasmania, and from the far south-east of South Australia across southern Victoria to Mallacoota. It is generally not considered at risk in Australia, expect in South Australia where it is listed as vulnerable.

== Taxonomy ==
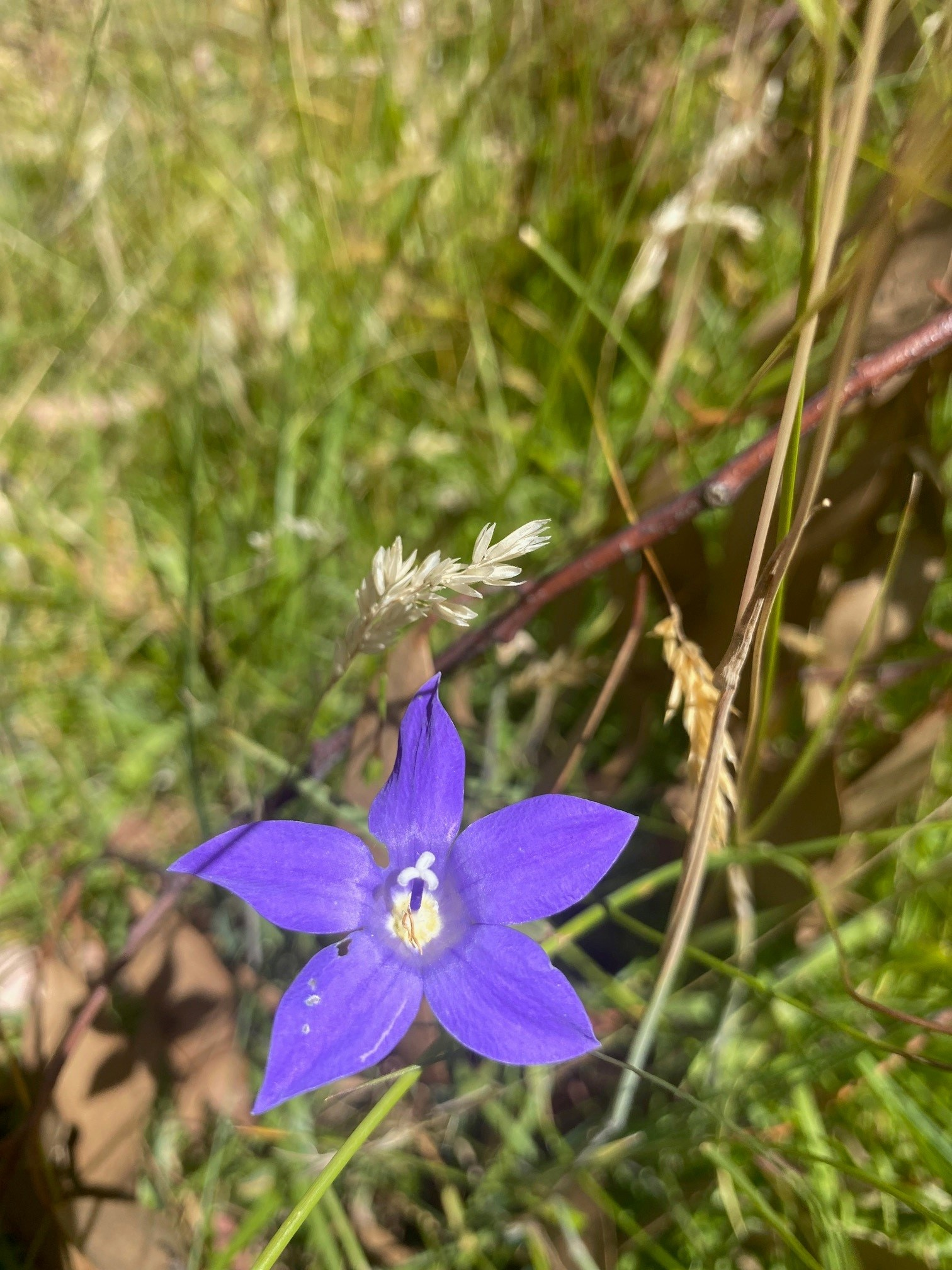
Wahlenbergia gymnoclada (Naked bluebell) inflorescence, Lake Crescent Tasmania

“The name Wahlenbergia was first introduced by Schrader (1814). However, as pointed out by van Steenis (1960), Schrader's name is a nomen nudum and the first validly published description was by Roth (1821). An earlier validly published name for the genus is Cervicina (Delile 1813), which has been made a nomen rejiciendum in favour of Wahlenbergia”. The etymological root of the binomial name gymnoclada is derived from ancient Greek. The prefix “gymno-”, comes from “gumnós” which means naked, and the suffix “-clada” is derived from “klado” meaning branch. The names W. billardierei and W. gymnoclada were both published in the same paper by Australian botanist, Noel Lothian (1947), but the latter has become the name generally applied to the species.
