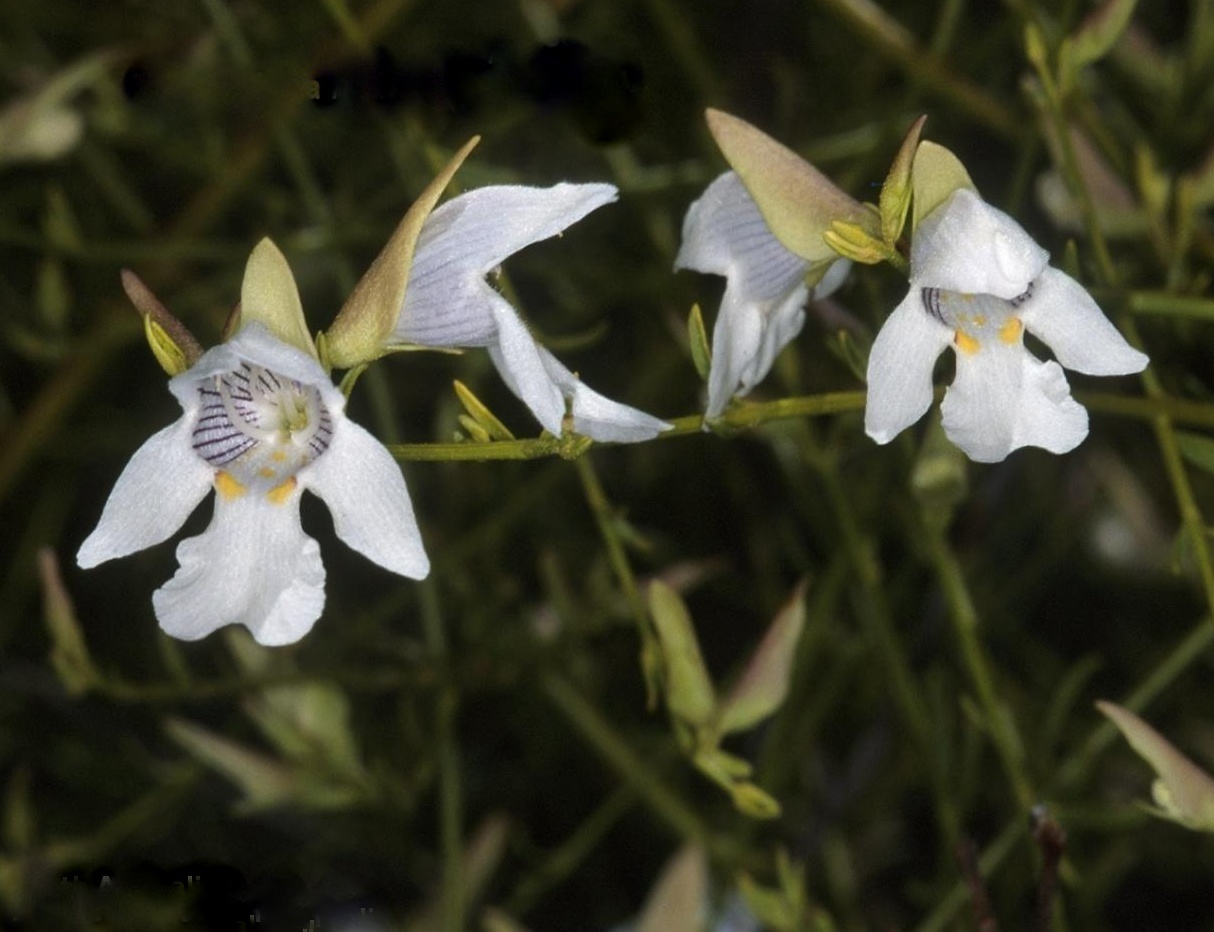

Scientific classification
- Kingdom: Plantae
- Clade: Tracheophytes
- Clade: Angiosperms
- Clade: Eudicots
- Clade: Asterids
- Order: Lamiales
- Family: Lamiaceae
- Genus: Prostanthera
- Species: P. nudula

Binomial name
- Prostanthera nudula J.M.Black ex E.L.Robertson
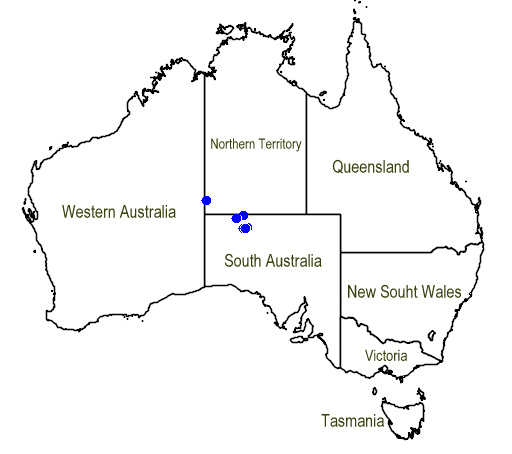
- Occurrence data from AVH

= Prostanthera nudula =

Species of flowering plant

Prostanthera nudula, commonly known as Mount Illbillee mintbush, is a species of flowering plant in the family Lamiaceae and is endemic to South Australia. It is a shrub with branches that become spiny, narrow elliptic leaves and pale cream-coloured flowers with yellow dots inside.

== Description ==
Prostanthera nudula is an erect to scrambling shrub that grows to a height of 0.5–2 mm (0.020–0.079 in) with branches that become rigid spines as they age. The leaves are narrow elliptic, 4–10.5 mm (0.16–0.41 in) long and 1.3–2.2 mm (0.051–0.087 in) wide on a petiole 0.3–0.8 mm (0.012–0.031 in) long. The flowers are arranged on pedicels 1.3–2.3 mm (0.051–0.091 in) long with bracteoles 1.5–2.4 mm (0.059–0.094 in) long near the base. The sepals are yellowish green, forming a tube 2.5–3.4 mm (0.098–0.134 in) long with two lobes, the lower lobe 3.3–4.7 mm (0.13–0.19 in) long and the upper lobe 5.2–8 mm (0.20–0.31 in) long. The petals are pale cream-coloured with yellow spots, 8–11 mm (0.31–0.43 in) long, the central lower lobe 3–3.5 mm (0.12–0.14 in) long and about 4 mm (0.16 in) wide. The lower lateral lobes are about 3 m (9.8 ft) long and 2 mm (0.079 in) wide and the upper lip is broadly egg-shaped, 4–4.5 mm (0.16–0.18 in) long and about 4.5 mm (0.18 in) wide. Flowering occurs from September to October.

== Taxonomy ==
Prostanthera nudula was first formally described in 1957 by Enid Lucy Robertson from an unpublished description by John McConnell Black. The description was published in the second edition of the Flora of South Australia from specimens collected by J.B. Cleland in the Everard Ranges in 1950.

== Distribution and habitat ==
Mount Illbillee mintbush grows amongst granite outcrops, usually near watercourse. It is relatively common in the Everard Ranges and is also found in the Musgrave Ranges.
