= Enid Lucy Robertson =

Australian botanist and conservationist (1925-2016)

Enid Lucy Robertson AM
- Born: Enid Lucy Ashby; 20 November 1925; Unley, Adelaide, South Australia
- Died: 10 July 2016 (aged 90); Belair, Adelaide, South Australia
- Known for: Systematic Botanist and Conservationist
- Spouse: Thorburn Robertson (m. 1947; died 1966)
- Parents: Arthur Keith Ashby (1896-1971); Edith Mary Walker (1896-1947)
- Relatives: Edwin and Esther Ashby (Paternal Grandparents); Alison Marjorie Ashby (Aunt); Brailsford Robertson (Father-in-law)
- Scientific career
- Fields: Botany
- Author abbrev. (botany): Enid L. Robertson; E.L. Robertson

Enid Lucy Robertson (née Ashby) AM (20 November 1925 - 10 July 2016) was a systematic botanist, curator of herbaria, and conservationist from South Australia. In the 1970s, she developed a new and innovative way to manage reserves, writing the Watiparinga Reserve Management Plan, which subsequently became the model used for other small to medium reserves in urban areas. For this she was awarded a Heritage Award by the Australian Governor General in 1986. Robertson was made a member of the order of Australia in 1987 for her services to botany.

== Early life ==
Robertson was born Enid Lucy Ashby on the 20 November 1925 to parents (Arthur) Keith Ashby (1896-1971) and Edith Mary Walker in Unley, South Australia. Keith was an orchardist, and Edith was from Gippsland in Victoria. Robertson, and her extended Ashby family, were members of the Religious Society of Friends, also known as Quakers.

Robertson's paternal grandparents were Edwin and Esther Ashby. Edwin was a South Australian property developer and a naturalist. Edwin and Esther's property Wittunga was near Blackwood in the Adelaide Hills, where Edwin developed extensive gardens, and Esther managed the property and kept the books. Robertson said that her grandmother Esther was so organised that even when she was bedridden for many years due to sickness, she continued to do the books from her bed.

Robertson's aunt was Alison Marjorie Ashby a botanical artist and plant collector. Robertson stated she was very close with her extended family, when she was growing up she lived across the street from her grandparents and her aunt. Robertson recollected that when she was a child the women in her family were members of the Women’s Non-Party, and they would have a yearly party under a Prunus Pissardii tree that used to stand in the Wittunga Gardens.

Robertson grew up in a house called Allambee, over the road from her grandparents. However, after her grandparents died, her family moved into their Wittunga property. In 1966, after her husband Thorburn Robertson, a doctor and son of Thorburn Robertson, had died aged 40, her father offered to renovate the Allambee house she grew up in for her and her children to live in. She lived in that house for much of her life.

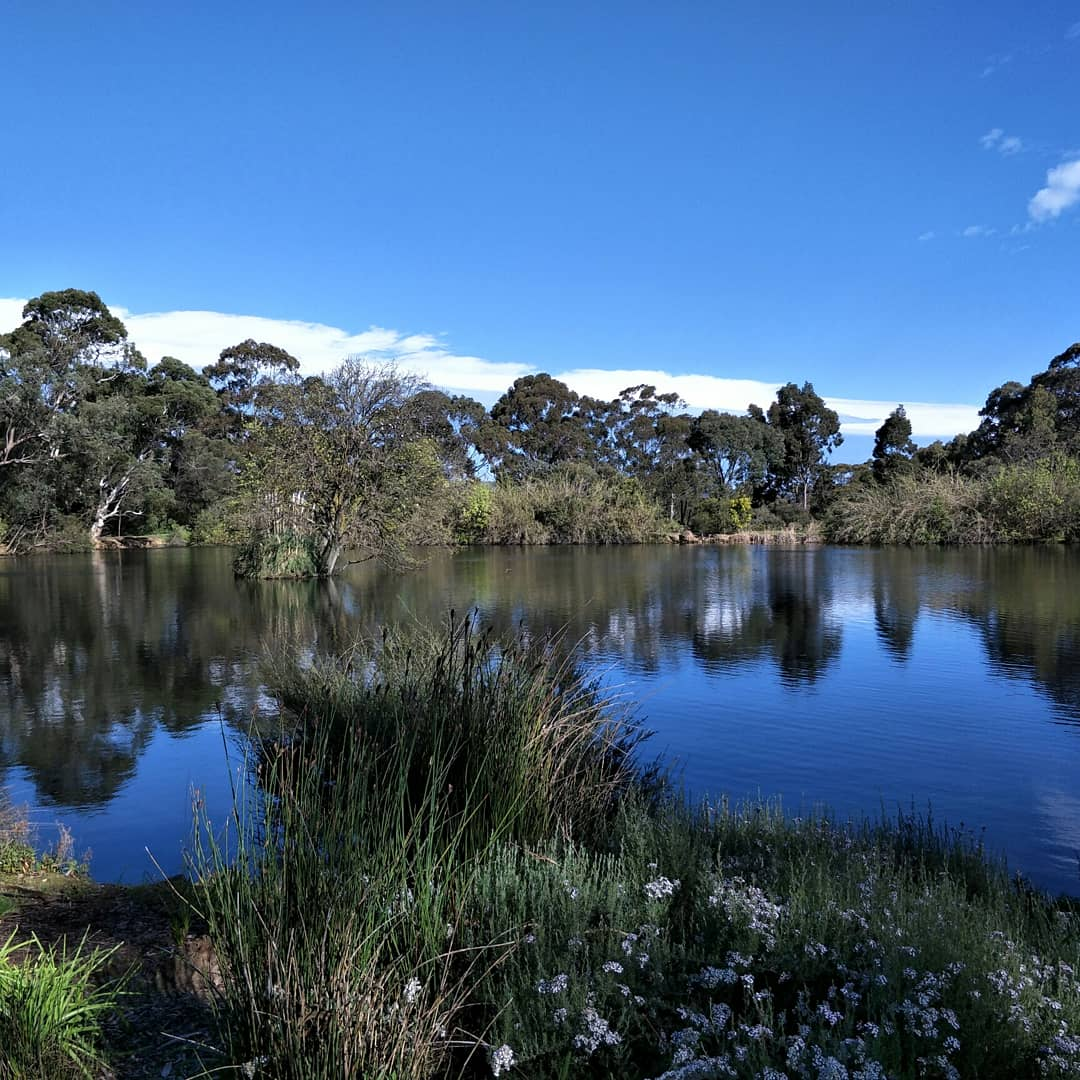
Wittunga Botanic Garden

The Ashby family donated the Wittunga property to the Board of Governors of the Adelaide Botanic Garden in 1965. The Wittunga Botanic Garden was open to the public in 1975.

Studying at the University of Adelaide, Robertson received her BSc in 1946. For her results in Botany 1 she was awarded the John Bagot Scholarship in 1944.

== Career ==
=== Early career ===
In 1947, Robertson took on two positions at the University of Adelaide, as a systematic botanist at the Waite Agricultural Research Institute, and as a lecturer in the medical school on microscopic anatomy and human histology. The Waite role had become available after Constance Margaret Eardley stepped down as the curator of the ADW Herbarium to take extended leave overseas. Eventually, Robertson stopped lecturing when the role with the Waite Institute became fulltime.

During her time at the Waite Institute, Robertson became acquainted with John McConnell Black, who was over 90 years old at the time. She took plant specimens to Black's house at Brougham Place, North Adelaide and he assisted her with identifications. When Black died in 1951, she completed his revision of the fourth volume of the second edition of his publication Flora of South Australia.

From 1953 until 1955 she was a senior research fellow at the Department of Botany at the University of Adelaide. managing the research infrastructure and an algal culture facility. Furthermore, she provided support to Bryan Womersley's phycological research.

Her research covered Poaceae and Asteraceae to seagrasses.

=== Watiparinga National Trust Reserve ===
In 1973, Robertson worked on a project to rejuvenate the Watiparinga Reserve. The land was the section of the Wittunga property that her aunt Alison Ashby had inherited and donated to the National Trust of South Australia. With the methods she was testing, Robertson developed a new and innovative way to manage reserves.

Robertson trialled many methods of removing weeds, eventually settling on a system that had similar principles to the Bradley method. Initially, she was assisted by her eldest daughter Helen, who was a medical student. She then began to employ more university students who needed part-time jobs to support their studies, one of whom was Hugh Possingham.

Based on this work, in 1984 Robertson wrote the Watiparinga Reserve Management Plan which became a prototype for other small to medium nature reserves in urban areas. For this management plan she was awarded a Heritage Award in 1986, presented by the Governor General in Sydney.

=== The Adelaide Botanic Garden board ===
In 1974, Robertson joined the board of the Adelaide Botanic Garden, the second woman to do so after Edith May Osborn (1891–1958), a British born Australian botanist and botanical collector. Robertson was a member of the board until 1980.

== Retirement ==
In 1987 Robertson retired, and turned her attention to the flora of the Mount Lofty Ranges, investigating the threat of invasive species, and lodging over 1,200 voucher specimens of the weeds in the State Herbarium of South Australia.

In 1992 Robertson was awarded the Australian Natural History Medallion, by the Field Naturalists Club of Victoria. This is awarded to those who have been judged to have made the best contribution to understandings of Australian Natural History.

In 1997, Robertson was honoured as a Member of the Order of Australia for "service to botany, particularly the conservation and management of native vegetation in South Australia, and to the community".

Robertson died in Belair, South Australia on the 10 July 2016.

She was inducted into the South Australian Environment Hall of Fame in 2023, when she was posthumously awarded a Lifetime Achievement Award.

== Published works ==
=== Bibliography ===
Robertson, Enid (1979). "Ashby, Edwin (1861–1941), estate agent and naturalist". In Nairn, Bede; Serle, Geoffrey (eds.). Australian Dictionary of Biography. Vol. 7. Melbourne, Victoria: Melbourne University Press. pp. 108–109.

Robertson, Enid (1979). "Black, John McConnell (1855-1951), botanist". In Nairn, Bede; Serle, Geoffrey (eds.). Australian Dictionary of Biography. Melbourne, Victoria: Melbourne University Press. pp. 304–305.

Black, J.M. (1980). Flora of South Australia. Part IV. Oleaceae - Compositae. Handbook of the flora and fauna of South Australia. Vol. 4. Revised by Enid L. Robertson (2nd ed.). Adelaide, South Australia: Govt. Printer.

Robertson, Enid L. (1981). Ling, John K. (ed.). Alison Ashby's wildflowers of southern Australia. paintings by Alison M. Ashby. Adelaide, South Australia: South Australian Museum Board and the Botanic Gardens Board. ISBN 0724356711.

Robertson, Enid L. (1984). Watiparinga Reserve management plan. Adelaide, South Australia: National Trust of South Australia. ISBN 0909378339.

Robertson, E.L. (1986). "Chapter: Botany". In Twidale, C.R.; Tyler, M.J.; Davies, M. (eds.). Ideas and Endeavours - The Natural Sciences in South Australia. Adelaide: Royal Society of South Australia. ISBN 095966274X.

Robertson, Enid L. (1999). Restoration of grassy woodland : Watiparinga Reserve management plan with an overview by Ann Prescott (2nd ed.). Adelaide, South Australia: National Trust of South Australia. ISBN 0959589864.

Robertson, Enid (2007). "Ashby, Alison Marjorie (1901-1987), Botanical Artist and Plant Collector". Australian Dictionary of Biography. Vol. 17. Melbourne, Victoria: Melbourne University Press. p. 35.

=== Journals ===
Robertson, Enid L. (23 July 1993). "Hansjörg Eichler 1 April 1916 - 22 June 1992". Journal of the Adelaide Botanic Gardens. 15 (2): 81–5. JSTOR 23874018.
