= Solanum ashbyae =

Scientific classification
- Kingdom: Plantae
- Clade: Tracheophytes
- Clade: Angiosperms
- Clade: Eudicots
- Clade: Asterids
- Order: Solanales
- Family: Solanaceae
- Genus: Solanum
- Species: S. ashbyae

Binomial name
- Solanum ashbyae Symon, 1981

Species of flowering plant

Solanum ashbyae is a species of plant in the family Solanaceae that is endemic to Western Australia. The specific epithet ashbyae honours botanical illustrator and plant collector Alison Ashby.

== Description ==
Its growth form is that of an erect shrub, 0.5–2.5 m in height. It produces blue to purple flowers from April to August.

== Distribution and habitat ==
It occurs on red sand or clay soils on rock outcrops and stony rises in the Gascoyne, Murchison, Pilbara and Yalgoo IBRA bioregions.
