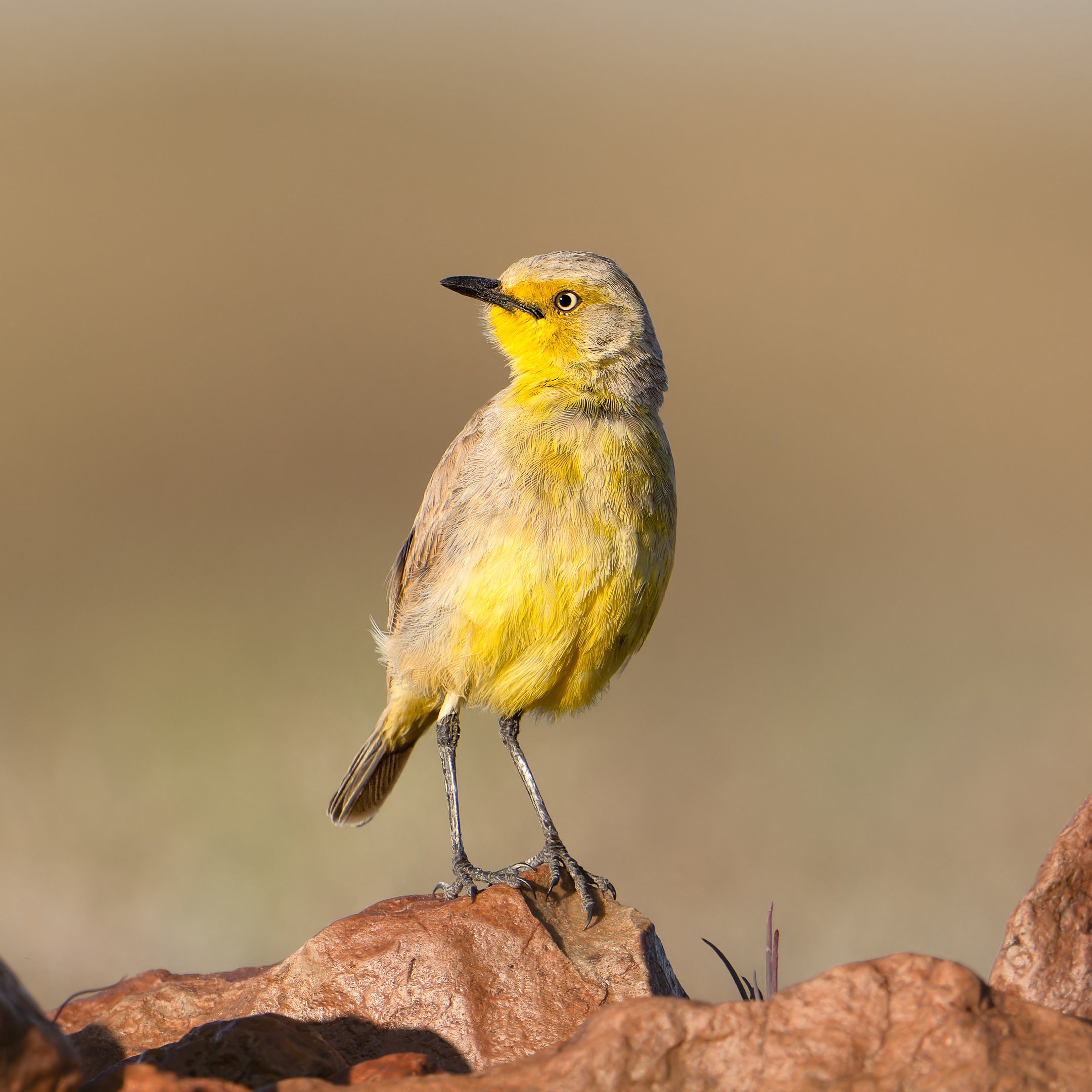

Conservation status
- Least Concern (IUCN 3.1)

Scientific classification
- Kingdom: Animalia
- Phylum: Chordata
- Class: Aves
- Order: Passeriformes
- Family: Meliphagidae
- Genus: Ashbyia; North, 1911
- Species: A. lovensis

Binomial name
- Ashbyia lovensis (Ashby, 1911)

= Gibberbird =

Species of bird

The gibberbird (Ashbyia lovensis) is a species of chat within the Meliphagidae family of passerine birds.

== Taxonomy ==
This species, also formerly known as the desert chat, is endemic to Australia and the only species within the genus Ashbyia. This genus was named after the South Australian ornithologist Edwin Ashby.^{[3]} The specific epithet lovensis honours the Irish missionary Reverend James Love (1889–1947). The gibberbird, along with the four chats of the genus Epithianura, have sometimes been placed in a separate family, Epthianuridae (the Australian chats), but are now thought to be aberrant honeyeaters in the family Meliphagidae.

The common name of gibberbird was given as a reflection of the gibber plains that make up the primary habitat for the species and unlike other chat species, the gibberbird is almost completely terrestrial, at ease on the ground level where it feeds, roosts and nests.

== Description ==
The gibberbird has a distinctive visage which is characterized by a grey crown, yellow forehead, face and underbelly with a black to grey-brown rump. The bill is a dark brown to black with grey-brown feet. The iris of the eye is a distinguishing shade of bright yellow.

Unlike other chats, the gibberbird only has slight sexual dimorphisms between the male and female. Females differ very slightly and can sometimes be distinguished by more brown plumage, especially around the throat, face and neck. They can also have a heavier breast band and a generally duller appearance in comparison to the males.

Juveniles appear similar to adults, with a brown back, crown and wings, and a pale yellow throat.

The gibberbird is monomorphic in terms of length and weight. Generic measurements have been found to range from 12.5 to 13 cm (4.9 to 5.1 in) in length and 14 to 20 g (0.49 to 0.71 oz) in weight.

== Distribution and habitat ==
The gibberbird is endemic to Australia and is known to inhabit the sparsely vegetated, stony regions of gibber desert. This habitat can include very open shrubland or grasslands. The extent of distribution for the gibberbird has been denoted as the southeastern Northern Territory, south-west Queensland to north-west New South Wales and across the northeastern region of South Australia. This species is more common on the sparsely vegetated, stony plains of the Lake Eyre basin and adjoining regions.

It is primarily a sedentary species with no records of migration patterns; however, there have been some local movements outside of breeding season, presumably for resource attainment, especially in times of drought or flood.

Gibberbirds are observed in sparsely vegetated stony deserts with a scattering of grasses such as Astrebla and Enneapogon. It is also found in low chenopod shrubland, which is mainly dominated by plant species such as Sclerolaena and Atriplex on higher ground. In the stony deserts of northern South Australia, gibberbirds can often be encountered in low, open shrubland or grassland of Atriplex vesicaria, Frankenia Serpyllifolia and Astrebla pectinata.

== Behaviour ==
=== Diet ===
The gibberbird primarily feeds upon a range of invertebrates including spiders, caterpillars, moths, cicadas, grasshoppers, and other insects. Gibberbirds are indiscriminate, opportunistic foragers and have been known to feed on blowfly larvae dropped from fly-blown sheep. These are obtained by turning over clay clods with their bill to expose the sheltering maggots. Smaller larvae are consumed whole while larger larvae are bashed on the ground several times before swallowing.

The majority of foraging occurs while walking on the ground but they will occasionally take to the air, up to 1 meter above ground level, while chasing flying insects. The gibberbird has also been observed running swiftly over short distances while chasing low-flying insects.

=== Breeding ===
The gibberbird has no set breeding period with nesting behaviour being observed year round, although the incidence of nesting is higher after the first rains of the season.

The nest of the gibberbird is usually situated in a depression on bare ground or beside a clump of saltbush or grass. Usually the gibberbird will nest with other pairs, often within 90m of one another. If a nest is robbed, all pairs without eggs or without young will desert and seek out a new nesting site, regardless of the stage of their nest. Those with eggs or young will remain at the nest site.

The nest of the gibberbird is in a shallow depression, probably scratched out by the bird, and which may be sheltered by a bush or clump of grass. The hollow is lined with twigs and grass to form a cup-shaped nest with a surrounding platform above ground level constructed of similar material. Common nest materials also include bark and rootlets. The nests of gibberbirds have also been observed to contain flower portions and anomalies such as horse hair or wool.

The average clutch size is between 2 and 4 eggs, measuring 20 mm × 15 mm (0.79 in × 0.59 in). Eggs are a pale pink to light flesh colour with reddish spots clustered around the larger end of the egg.

The gibberbird chicks are altricial, blind and naked upon hatching.

=== Voice ===
There is little information on the call of the gibberbird and further studies will need to be conducted to fill the gaps in our knowledge of this species. However, from current studies it is known that the gibberbird has a sweet song that is thought to be utilised to call to a mate. This song has been described as "musical chatter" and to hear it is a squeaky "weet-weet-weet".

The alarm call of the gibberbird is a series of 5 or 6 high piercing notes, which triggers nearby gibberbirds to seek shelter.

The display call of the gibberbird is a sharp "whit-whit-whit" or a clear "tswee-tswee-tswee" performed during the ascending part of the display flight.

== Conservation status ==
The gibberbird is classed as Least Concern on the IUCN Red List. It is possible that the gibberbird is one of the few species that has actually benefited from the introduction of stock, both through the modifications of its habitat and the increased availability of insect larvae during the winter season.
