= Ulmus glaucescens var. glaucescens =

Scientific classification
- Kingdom: Plantae
- Clade: Embryophytes
- Clade: Tracheophytes
- Clade: Spermatophytes
- Clade: Angiosperms
- Clade: Eudicots
- Clade: Rosids
- Order: Rosales
- Family: Ulmaceae
- Genus: Ulmus
- Species: U. glaucescens Franch.
- Variety: U. g. var. glaucescens

Trinomial name
- Ulmus glaucescens var. glaucescens

Variety of tree

Ulmus glaucescens var. glaucescens is a Chinese tree endemic to mountain slopes at elevations of 2000–2400 m in the provinces of Gansu, Hebei, Henan, Liaoning, Nei Mongol, Ningxia, eastern Qinghai, Shaanxi, Shandong, and Shanxi.

== Description ==
The variety is distinguished by a "samara glabrous except stigmatic surface pubescence in notch. Fl. and fr. March–May".

== Pests and diseases ==
No information available.

== Cultivation ==
The tree is very rare in cultivation beyond China.

== Accessions ==
=== North America ===
- Morton Arboretum, US. Acc. details not known.

=== Europe ===
- Grange Farm Arboretum, Lincolnshire, UK. Two grafted trees from cuttings ex Morton. Acc. no. 1130.
