= Noel Lothian =

Australian botanist (1915–2004)

Thomas Robert Noel Lothian OBE
- Born: 25 December 1915; Mont Albert, Victoria, Australia
- Died: 24 September 2004 (aged 88); Townsville, Queensland, Australia
- Resting place: Mount Lofty Botanic Garden, South Australia
- Scientific career
- Fields: Botany

Thomas Robert Noel Lothian OBE, NDH (NZ), LFRAIPR, JP (25 December 1915 – 24 September 2004) was a long-term director of the Adelaide Botanic Garden and an Australian botanist.

Lothian was born on 25 December 1915 in the Melbourne suburb of Mont Albert. After completing school at Scotch College, Melbourne, he studied at Burnley Horticultural College. He worked in botanical gardens in Melbourne and at the Christchurch Botanic Gardens in New Zealand, then started study at the Royal Botanic Gardens, Kew in 1938. Lothian was an exchange student at the Munich Botanic Garden when the Second World War broke out, catching the last train out of Germany in 1939. After returning to the United Kingdom to complete studies at Kew Gardens, he joined the Australian Army and as a lieutenant managed army farms supplying food to the troops in central New Guinea. After the war, he gained the National Diploma of Horticulture (NZ), for which he was awarded the Cockayne Gold Medal. He was appointed Senior Lecturer in Horticulture, at Lincoln Agricultural College near Christchurch, New Zealand, where he established the horticultural diploma and degree courses. In late 1947 he was appointed director of the Adelaide Botanic Garden, a position he held for 33 years until 1980. He commenced work there on 1 January 1948. The Gardens had greatly deteriorated during the Depression and Second World War. The Garden was little better than a public park and he threw himself into bringing it back to the position he felt it should have.

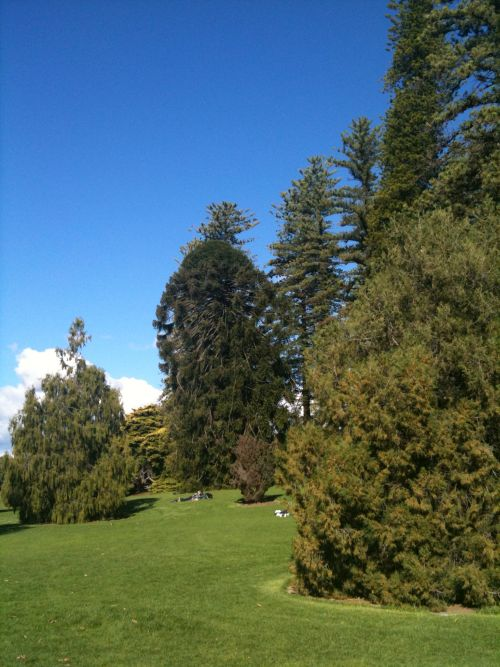
Adelaide Botanic Garden scene

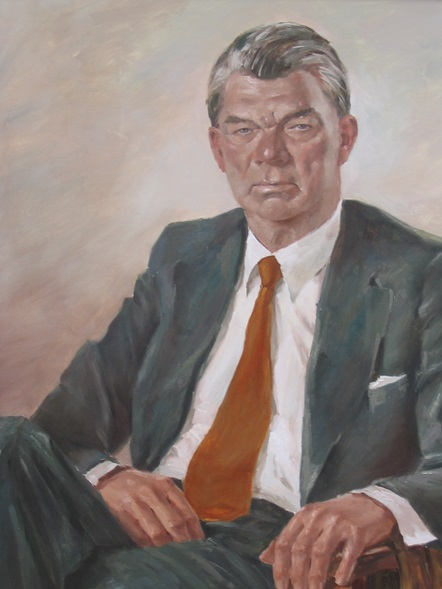
Oil painting of Noel Lothian by artist, Andrew Matthews, at Victor Harbour, 1981. Used with permission

While Director of the Botanic Garden, he was a prominent member of the Royal Society and chairman of its offshoot, the Field Naturalists Society for several years. In 1961 he was awarded an OBE for services to horticulture, and in 1975 the Veitch Medal of the Royal Horticultural Society. In 1988 Noel was installed as the President of the Kew Guild in London which brings together past and present workers at the Kew Gardens.

Another of Lothian's achievements was the expansion of the National Parks system in South Australia. He was appointed a member of the National Parks Commission and then became chairman during the late 1960s, a period of unparalleled growth in the number and area of parks. Key members of the commission were the previous chair, Professor Sir John Cleland, Warren Bonython, Vern McLaren, Basil Newland, Dr Peter Crowcroft, director of the South Australian Museum and Cecil Rix, Chairman of the Land Board in the Lands Department which was responsible for Crown Land. Together Noel and Cecil appraised unallocated Crown Lands to determine their significance for indigenous flora and fauna. Many of these areas were then placed under the reserve system. From 1962 to 1972 the number of parks grew fivefold from 19 to 99, and the area grew 15-fold from 230,000 hectares to over 3.5 million hectares. They laid the basis for today's extensive park system. Lothian was a councilor and member of the executive of the Royal Agricultural and Horticultural Society since 1948. The RAHS organised the Royal Adelaide Show at Wayville every spring and Lothian was a frequent exhibitor along with the Botanic Garden. He was also member of the Council of the University of Adelaide for some years. He was a long-standing member of the International Dendrology Society, Australian Vice-president and a very active member.

== Botanical collections ==
Specimens collected by Lothian are held by many herbaria in Australasia, including the State Herbarium of South Australia, the Australian Tropical Herbarium at James Cook University, the National Herbarium of Victoria – Royal Botanic Gardens Victoria, the Australian National Herbarium, and the Auckland War Memorial Museum Herbarium.

== Legacy ==
He is the namesake of the Noel Lothian Hall, a function space in the western end of the State Herbarium of South Australia, Adelaide Botanic Garden that opened on 16 June 2005. The function space and herbarium themselves are located in a refurbished tram barn.

== Personal ==
Lothian was born Thomas Robert Noel Lothian, and because he was born on Christmas Day in 1915, he was known as Noel. He was the eldest of 3 brothers and two sisters. His father, Thomas Lothian, established Lothian Publishing in Melbourne, which probably instilled in Noel his love of books. The father of his first wife, Ngaio, was also in the book trade, working at Whitcombe and Tombs in Christchurch.

Lothian married Ngaio Chaffey from Christchurch, New Zealand in 1940. They had three children, Tony (1942) and twins Andrew and Janet (1947). Lothian and Ngaio separated and subsequently divorced in 1970 and in 1973 he married Vivian Mack.

Wayne Thomas wrote: "Few people are intelligent enough, or hard-working enough, to leave this world in a better place than they found it. Noel was very special – his dedication to this state will ensure he is always remembered"

His friend, Ed McAllister AO, said in his eulogy: Noel was straightforward, uncomplicated, told it like it was, single-minded at times, gregarious, a loyal friend, supportive of his staff and had a great zest for life. He also had a great sense of time and place. He was aware and proud of his achievements, but never arrogant about them. He was also a man of great vision and able to take the long view. This garden in which we stand today attests to that...Noel had an encyclopaedic knowledge of plants, particularly his favourite bulbous plants. He had a wide knowledge of Australian plants as well as a vast knowledge of plants from temperate parts of the world. Some of this knowledge was gained from his experiences in Botanic Gardens, but a lot was gained from his extensive travels...He once told me that when he came to Adelaide, there were two kinds of people in Adelaide, those who knew we had a Botanic Garden and those who did not. By the time he retired, there were still two kinds of people in Adelaide, those who visited the Gardens and those who did not, but everyone knew there was a Botanic Garden...Noel loved his work and dedicated himself to it. I remember on one occasion when he came striding into work one morning, shortly after I was appointed to the Gardens in 1979. He said "are you enjoying yourself, Ed?", to which I, of course replied, "Yes Mr Lothian". His response was "Good, otherwise, you shouldn't be here". A simple philosophy, but one which he believed in and which is very true.

Lothian died on 24 September 2004 in Townsville, Queensland. On 8 October 2004 his ashes were scattered at the cool temperate botanical gardens at Mount Lofty that he had been integral in establishing.
