= Edwin Ashby =

Australian property developer, and biologist (1861–1941)

- Born: 2 November 1861
- Died: 8 January 1941 (aged 79); Adelaide, South Australia
- Occupations: Property developer, malacologist, ornithologist, botanist and conservationist
- Spouse: Esther Maria Coleman
- Relatives: Alison Marjorie Ashby (daughter); Enid Lucy Robertson (granddaughter)
- Scientific career
- Fields: Botany
- Author abbrev. (botany): ashby

Edwin Ashby (2 November 1861 – 8 January 1941) was an Adelaide-based Australian property developer and a noted malacologist interested in chitons and ornithologist.

He was a founding member of the South Australian Ornithological Association (SAOA) in 1899, and of the Royal Australasian Ornithologists Union (RAOU) in 1901 for which he served as president 1926. The avian genus Ashbyia (represented by the gibberbird Ashbyia lovensis) was named for him by Gregory Mathews.

Ashby and his family were members of the Religious Society of Friends, also known as Quakers.

== Family properties ==
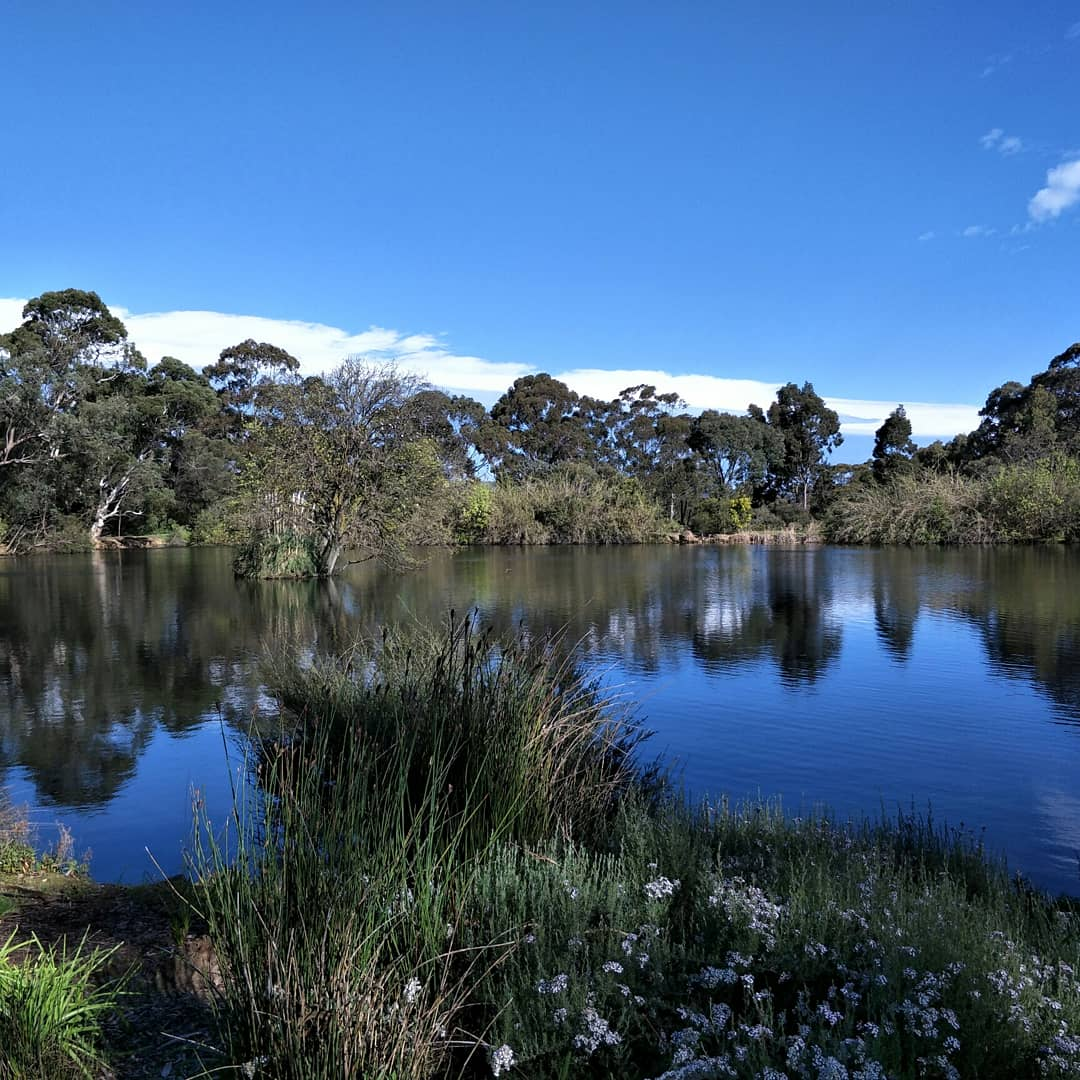
Wittunga Botanic Garden

=== Wittunga ===
Ashby was married to Esther Maria Coleman, and they had four children. Together they ran a farm, called 'Wittunga', in the Adelaide Hills. In 1901, Ashby began an extensive formal English garden beside the main house. Esther managed the business side of Wittunga property. Arthur Keith Ashby, their son, later developed the land botanically, and then eventually donated the gardens to the State of South Australia in 1965, and it was opened to the public in 1975 as Wittunga Botanic Garden.

=== Watiparinga ===
In 1911, Ashby expanded the Wittunga farming operation when he acquired a nearby parcel called 'Watiparinga'. After he died his daughter Alison Marjorie Ashby inherited Watiparinga, and in the late 1950s, she began planting thousands of seedlings of Australian plants in Watiparinga. She eventually donated Watiparinga to the National Trust of South Australia in 1957, which now operates it as the Watiparinga Reserve.

From the 1970s Ashby's granddaughter, Enid Lucy Robertson, began a project to regenerate the land, and in 1984 she wrote the Watiparinga Reserve Management Plan which became a prototype for other small to medium nature reserves in urban areas. This led to her being awarded a Heritage Award in 1986.

The Watiparinga Reserve was added to the Register of the National Estate in 1996.
