= Alison Marjorie Ashby =

Australian artist (1901–1987)

Alison Ashby MBE
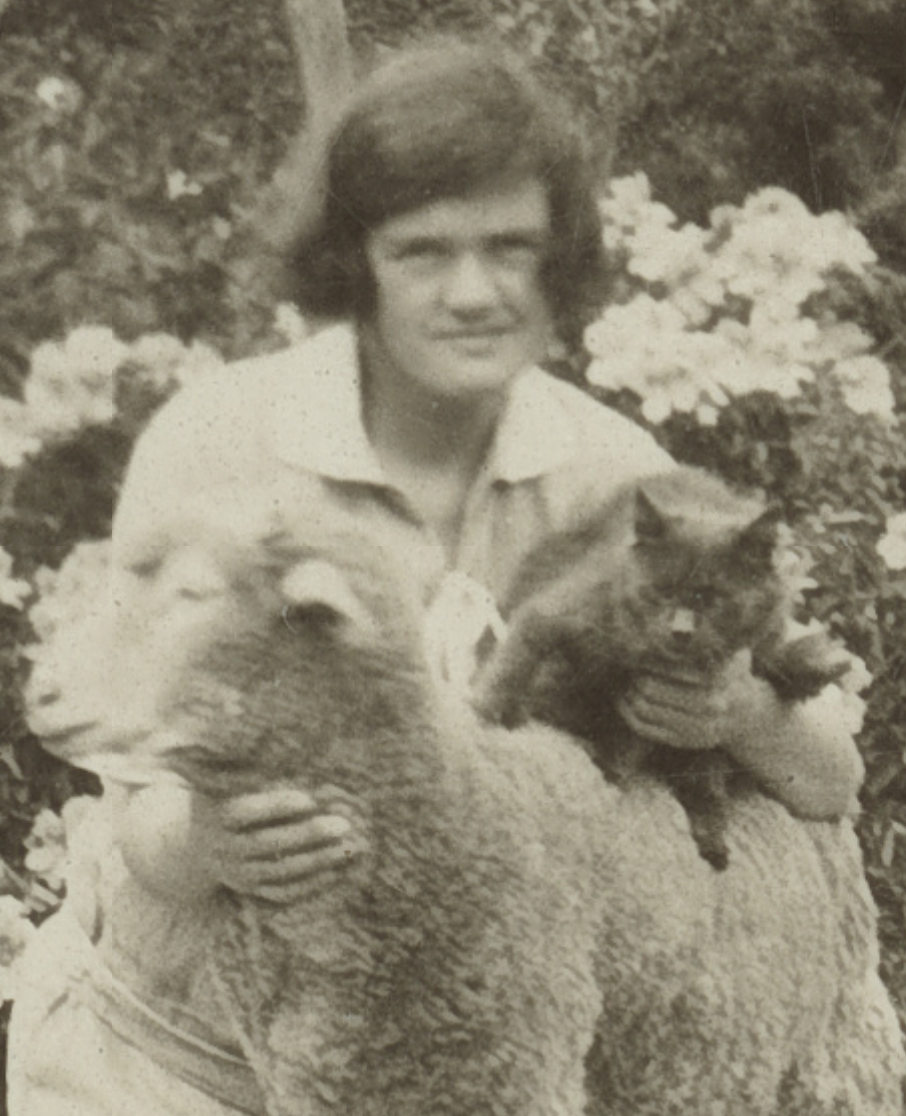
- Alison Ashby at Wittunga, 1929
- Born: Alison Marjorie Ashby; 7 February 1901; North Adelaide, Adelaide, South Australia
- Died: 12 August 1987 (aged 86); Victor Harbor, South Australia
- Known for: botanical artist and plant collector
- Scientific career
- Fields: Botany
- Author abbrev. (botany): A.M.Ashby

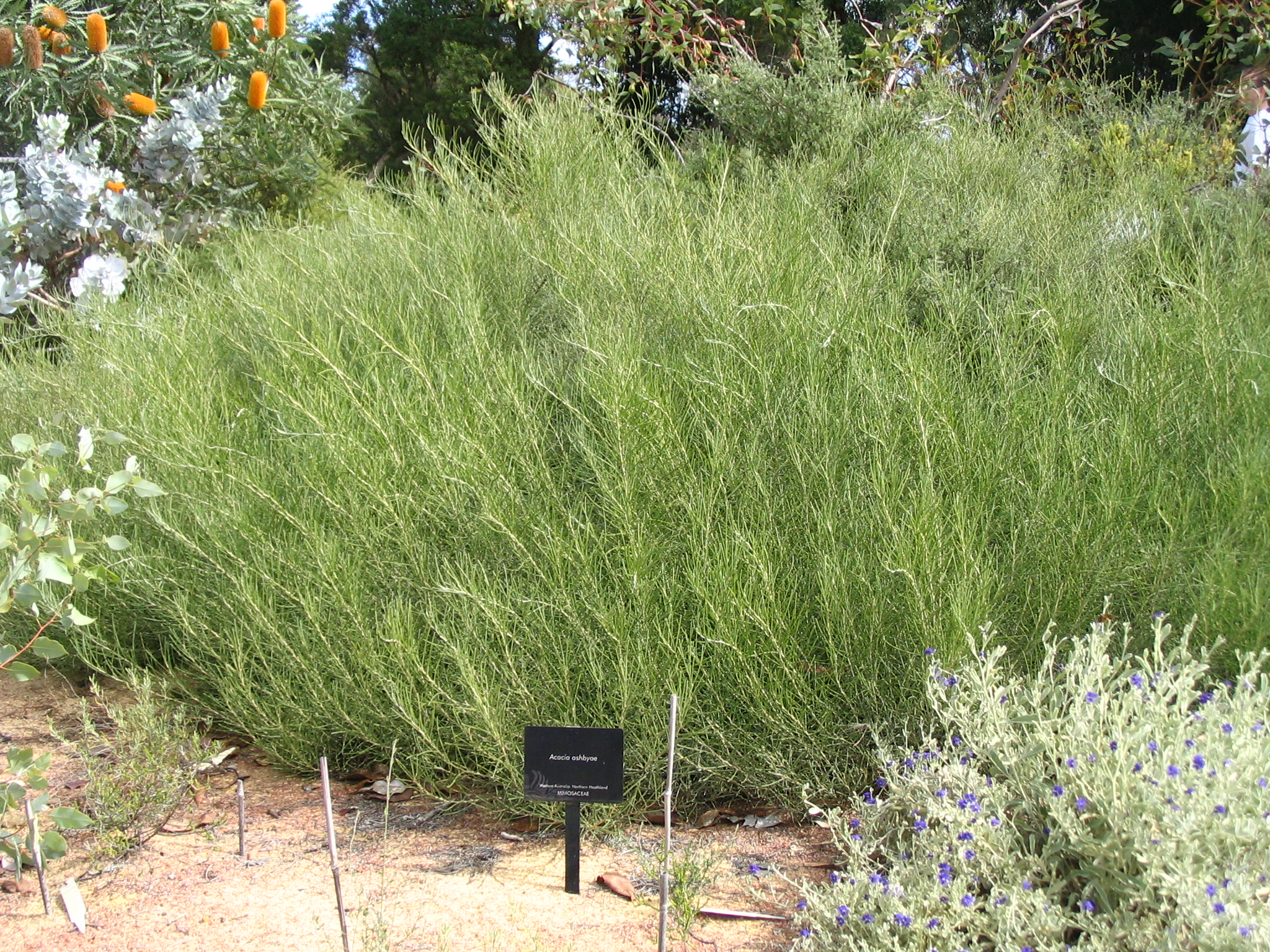
Acacia ashbyae

Alison Marjorie Ashby MBE (7 February 1901 – 12 August 1987) was an Australian botanical artist and plant collector.

== Early life ==
Ashby was born in Adelaide, South Australia as a youngest daughter of four children, of a property developer and naturalist Edwin Ashby and his South Australian-born wife Esther Maria, née Coleman. In 1902, the family moved to a Blackwood farming property called Wittunga situated at the foot of the Adelaide Hills, which later became the Wittunga Botanic Garden. Ashby was mainly educated at home since she was handicapped by shyness, bad stutter and hypothyroidism. Encouraged by her father, she took an interest in native plants and began painting wildflowers.

== Career ==
From 1944, after both her parents had died, Ashby began to make longer trips to collect plants as specimens for various herbaria and also to propagate from seeds and cuttings. She was an active member of the South Australian branch of the Society for Growing Australian Plants. From 1963 to 1977, she made regular car journeys each year to collect and illustrate plants, driving to Southwest Australia in the winter and to the Australian Alps in the summer. In 1972, she moved to Victor Harbor and died in 1987.

Ashby's inherited section of her family's Wittunga property was donated to the National Trust of South Australia in 1957 and became the 32 ha Watiparinga Reserve. Her 1500 botanical paintings were mostly donated to the South Australian Museum and are now held in the State Herbarium. Plants named in her honour include Acacia ashbyae and Solanum ashbyae.

== Honours and awards ==
- MBE (1960)
- Australian Natural History Medallion (1975)
