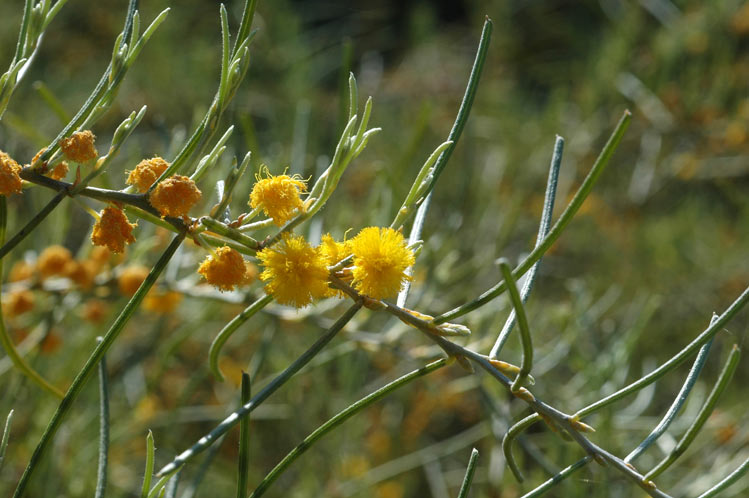

Scientific classification
- Kingdom: Plantae
- Clade: Tracheophytes
- Clade: Angiosperms
- Clade: Eudicots
- Clade: Rosids
- Order: Fabales
- Family: Fabaceae
- Subfamily: Caesalpinioideae
- Clade: Mimosoid clade
- Genus: Acacia
- Species: A. ashbyae

Binomial name
- Acacia ashbyae Maslin
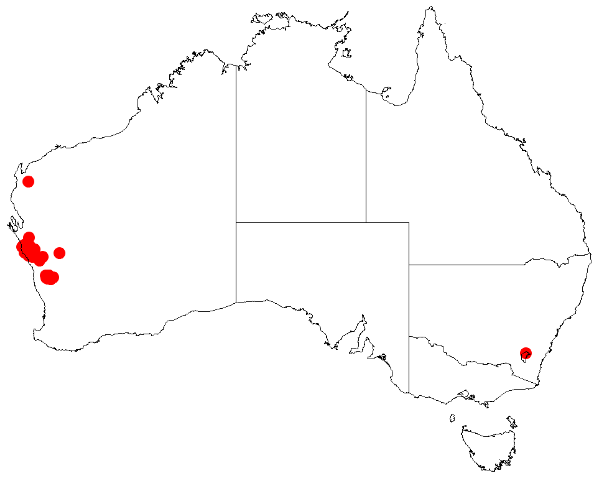
- Occurrence data from AVH

Synonyms
- Racosperma ashbyae (Maslin) Pedley

= Acacia ashbyae =

Species of legume

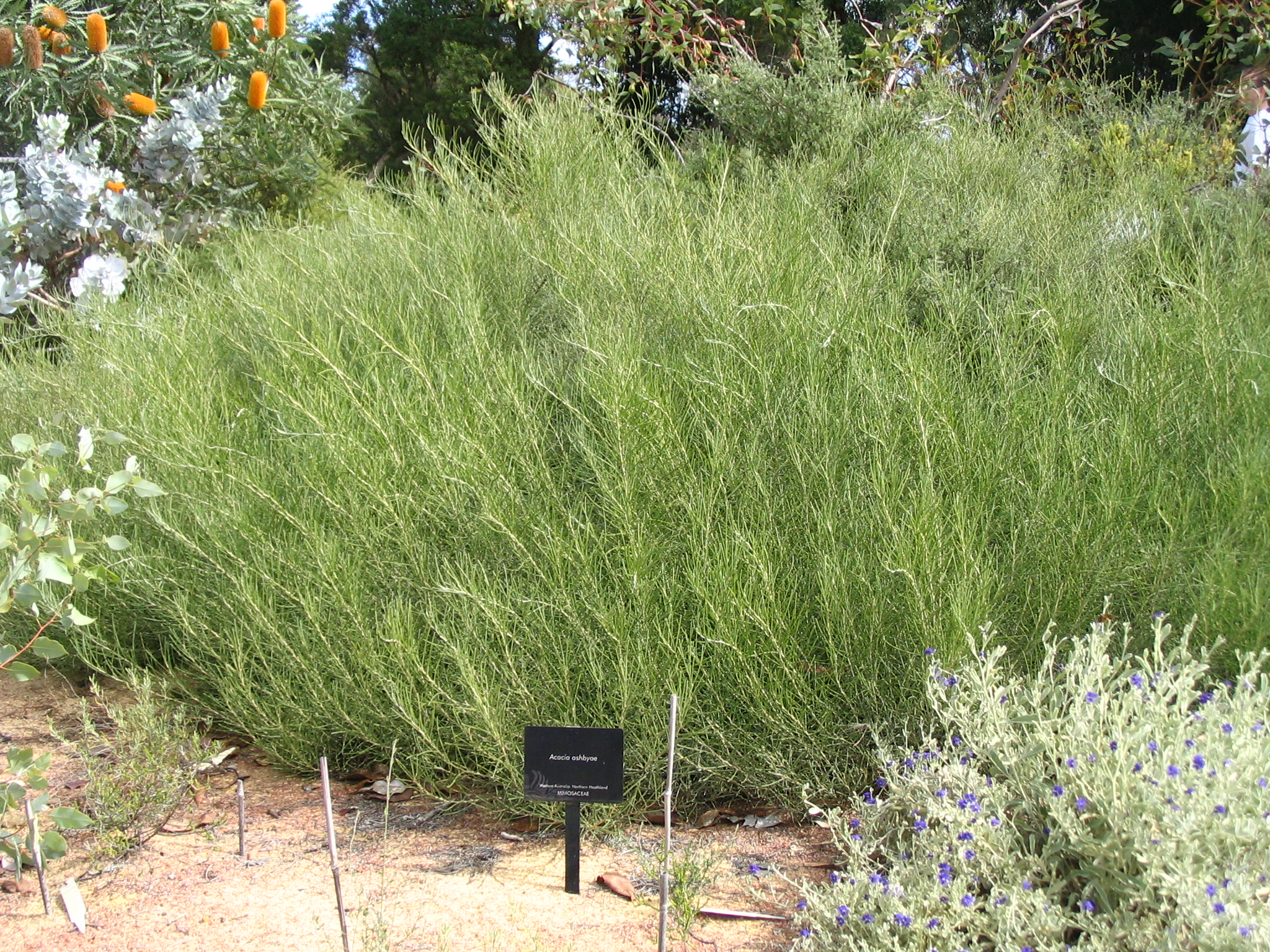
Habit in Kings Park, Perth

Acacia ashbyae is a species of flowering plant in the family Fabaceae and is endemic to the south-west of Western Australia. It is a dense, spreading, rounded shrub with hairy narrowly linear to oblong more or less glabrous, greyish-green phyllodes, oblong to shortly cylindrical heads of golden yellow flowers, and pods more or less like a string of beads up to 35 mm (1.4 in) long.

== Description ==
Acacia ashbyae is a dense, spreading, rounded shrub that typically grows up to 1.5–2 m (4 ft 11 in – 6 ft 7 in) high, about 2 m (6 ft 7 in) wide and has its new shoots densely covered with woolly, whitish hairs. Its phyllodes are more or less glabrous, narrowly linear to narrowly oblong, sometime round in cross-section, 20–90 mm (0.79–3.54 in) long and 1–4 mm (0.039–0.157 in) wide with a gland 10–20 mm (0.39–0.79 in) above it base. The flowers are arranged in two oval to shortly cylindrical heads in axils on a peduncle 7–11 mm (0.28–0.43 in) long, each head with 26 to 31 golden-yellow flowers. Flowering occurs from July to September, and the pods are thinly crust-like, arranged more or less like a string of beads, up to 35 mm (1.4 in) long and 2–3.5 mm (0.079–0.138 in) wide, containing oblong brown seeds 3–4 mm (0.12–0.16 in) long.

== Taxonomy ==
Acacia ashbyae was first formally described in 1974 by the botanist Bruce Maslin in the journal Nuytsia from specimens collected by Alison Marjorie Ashby near Naraling in 1972. The specific epithet (ashbyae) honours the collector of the type specimens and "who, for many years, has made valuable collections of the Western Australian flora".

== Distribution and habitat ==
This species of wattle occurs on sandy and loamy soils along roadsides, on rocky rises and sandplains from near Nerren Nerren Station north of the Murchison River to Naraling and near Mullewa, and in the Coorow area, in the Avon Wheatbelt, Geraldton Sandplains and Yalgoo IBRA bioregions.

== Conservation status ==
Acacia ashbyae is listed as "not threatened" by the Government of Western Australia Department of Biodiversity, Conservation and Attractions.

== See also ==
- List of Acacia species
