= Wittunga Botanic Garden =

Coordinates: 35.0235°S 138.6099°E

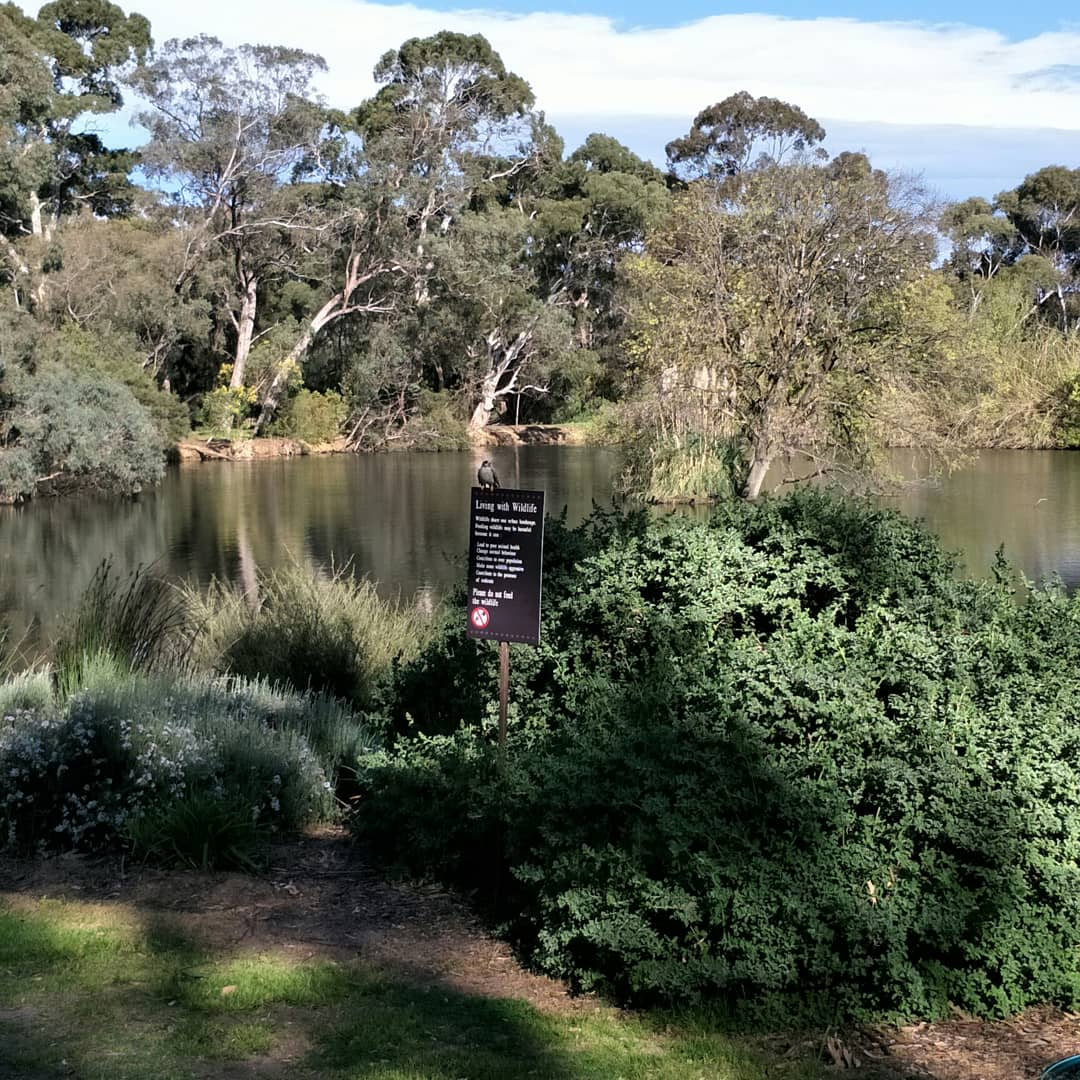
Wittunga Botanic Garden

The Wittunga Botanic Garden is one of three botanic gardens in Adelaide, South Australia administered by the Botanic Gardens of South Australia, a State Government statutory authority; the other two are the Adelaide Botanic Garden, located in the inner city's parklands, and the Mount Lofty Botanic Garden. The Wittunga garden is located on Shepherds Hill Road, Blackwood, on the western scarp of the Adelaide Hills.

Beginning as a formal English garden at the home of Edwin Ashby in 1901, it changed over the years assisted by the efforts of Edwin's son, Arthur Keith Ashby to include South African and native Australian plants. Wittunga’s displays of these plants are especially spectacular in spring and include rich collections of Erica, Leucadendron, and Protea, complemented by displays of exotic and unusual bulbs and colourful annuals. The majority of the South African plants in the garden come from the Cape Province district which has a climate similar to that of Adelaide.

The Australian collection features plants from the Fleurieu Peninsula and Kangaroo Island, southern Western Australia and includes a fine collection of eucalypts. Meandering pathways through the Terrace and Sandplain Gardens give visitors the opportunity to see these distinctive and colourful collections. Many different birds can be seen attracted by the good supplies of nectar produced by the flowers of plants in the collection.

In 1965 Edwin Ashby's son Keith donated the garden to the State. It was opened to the public in 1975 and is managed by the Botanic Gardens of South Australia.

The garden features several small rotunda with seating, lawns suitable for picnicking and a trail of interpretive botanical signage. Connected by a spillway, two ponds in the park support a variety of native water birds and amphibians. Among the resident birds are Pacific black ducks, Australian wood ducks, Australasian grebes and Eurasian coots. A population of Murray River turtles can often be seen basking on the surface or on the ponds' muddy banks during warmer months.

In 1980, it was listed on the now-defunct Register of the National Estate.

== Special events ==
An annual outdoor concert occurs in March, and is coordinated by Lions Club of Blackwood Inc. The event was first held in 2003 and features live music, jazz and dance performances presented under the title of Wittunga Under the Stars. Previous performers have included the Bearded Gypsy Band, Zen Knights, New Orleans Ramblers, Studio Flamenco dancers and the St. John's Grammar School Band.

== See also ==
- List of Adelaide parks and gardens
