= Mount Lofty Botanic Garden =

Botanical garden at Mount Lofty, South Australia

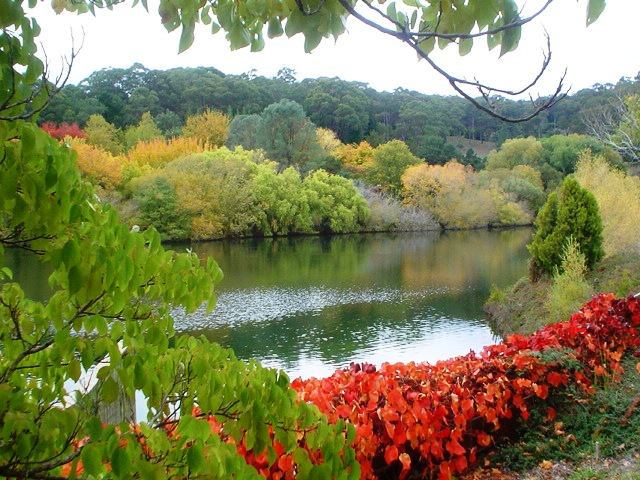
- Mount Lofty Botanic Garden Lake
- Interactive map of Mount Lofty Botanic Garden
- Type: Botanical
- Location: Crafers, South Australia
- Coordinates: 34°59′21″S 138°42′50″E
- Area: 97 ha (240 acres)
- Opened: 1977
- Owner: Government of South Australia
- Operator: The Botanic Gardens of South Australia
- Website: www.botanicgardens.sa.gov.au/visit/mount-lofty-botanic-garden

First opened in 1977, the crescent-shaped Mount Lofty Botanic Garden is situated on 100 hectares on the eastern slopes of Mount Lofty in the Adelaide Hills east of Adelaide in South Australia. The cooler, wetter location suits plants from temperate climates which are difficult to grow on the Adelaide Plains. Amongst the native Australian flora there are tree ferns, as well as exotic cultivated plants from cool climates including Rhododendron and Magnolia and the National Species Rose Collection. The Mount Lofty Botanic Garden, together with the Adelaide and Wittunga Botanic Gardens, is administered by the Botanic Gardens of South Australia, a State Government statutory authority.

In 1980, it was listed on the now-defunct Register of the National Estate.

== Features ==
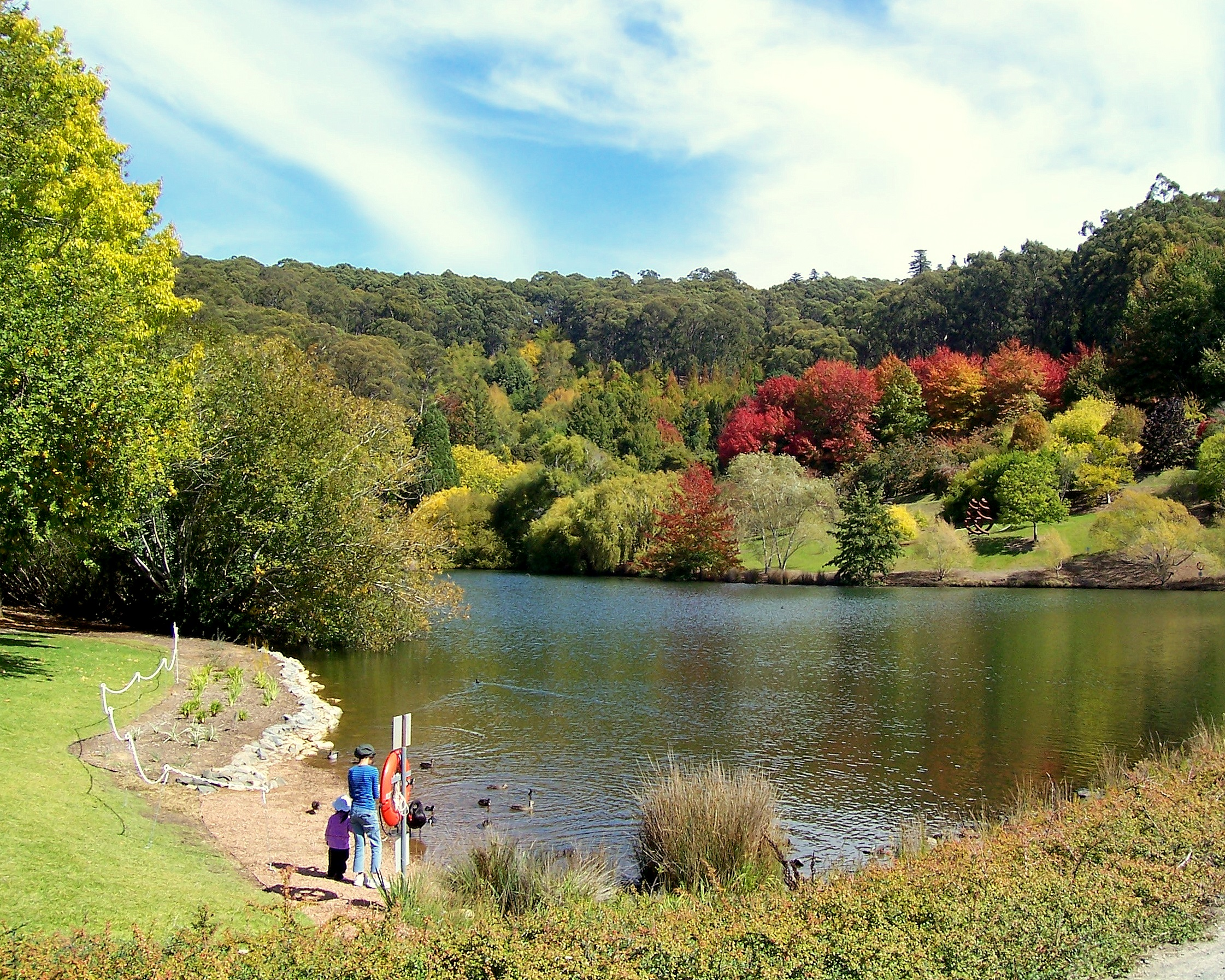
Mount Lofty Botanic Garden Lake

Gullies

East African Gully, Fern Gully, Magnolia Gully, New Zealand Gully, Rhododendron Gully, South American Gully, Southeast Asian Gully, Western Asian Gully.

The Fern Gully contains one of the country's "most diverse fern collections". At least 36 species of the Magnolia genus are represented in Magnolia Gully.

Loops and trails

Boundary Loop, Central Loop, Heysen Loop, Lakeside Loop, Lower Loop, Rhododendron Trail.

== Gallery ==
Autumn
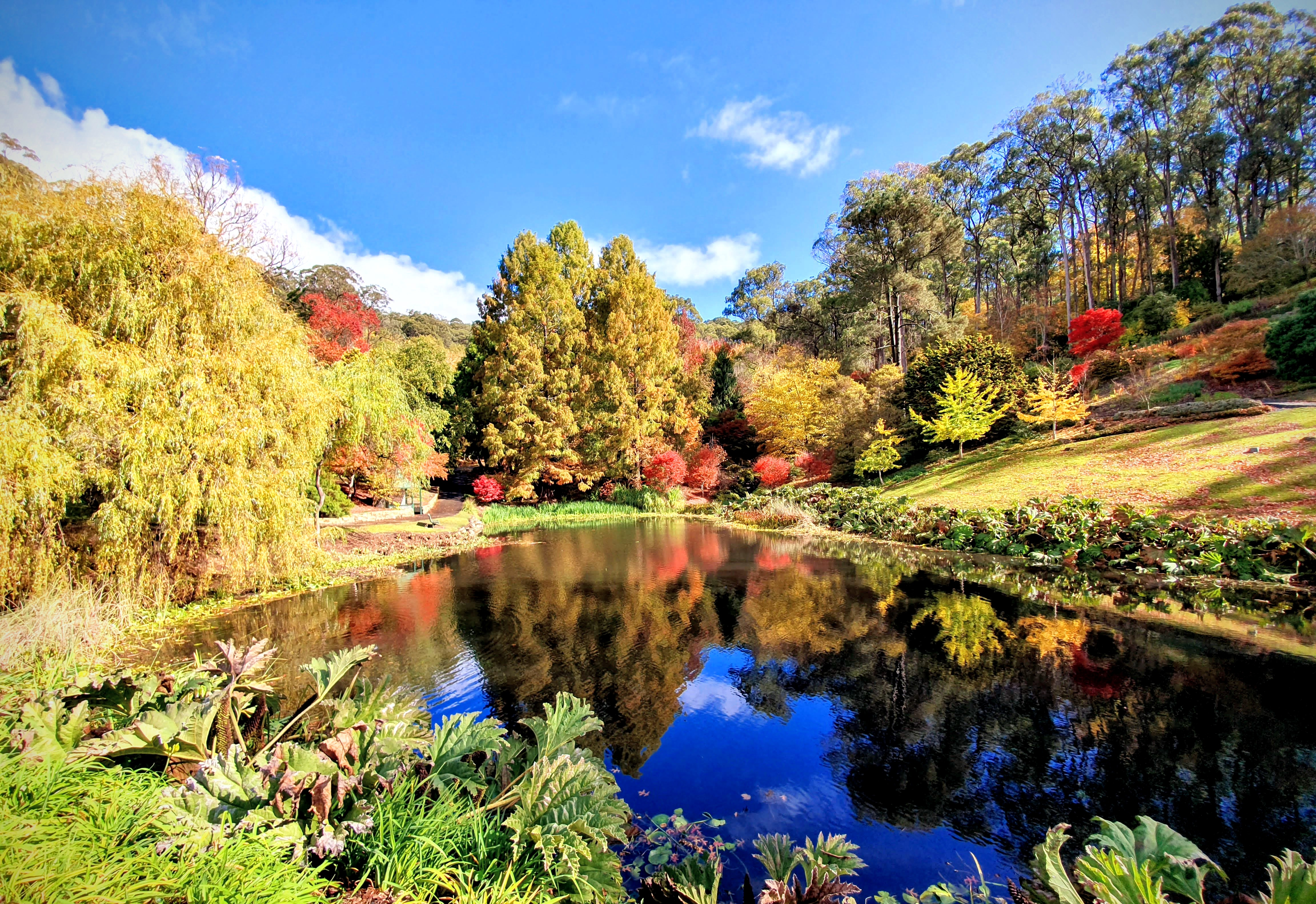
Stunning Autumn Colours in the Adelaide Hills

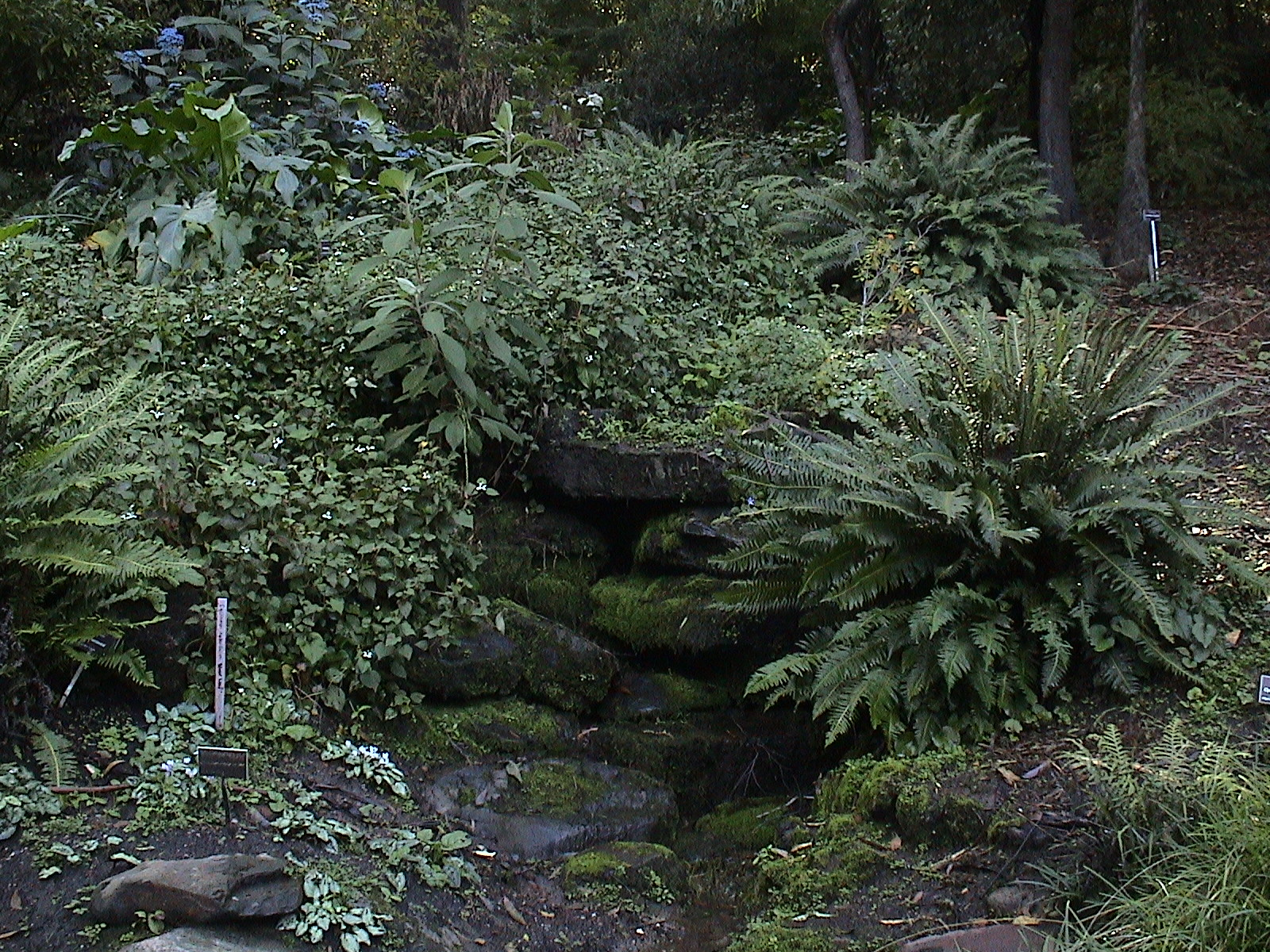
Mossy rock pool, Spring Gully

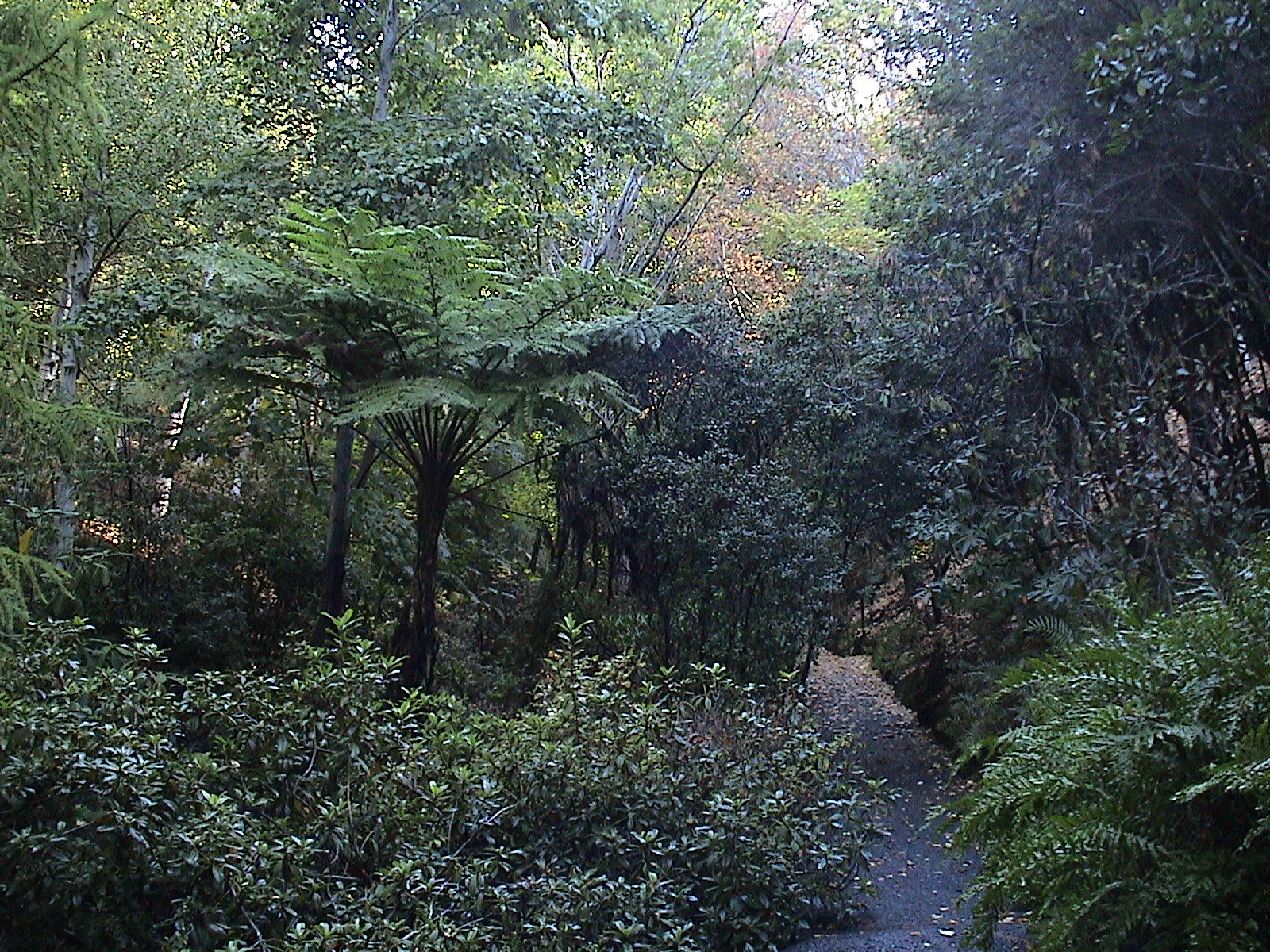
Tree ferns in Fern Gully

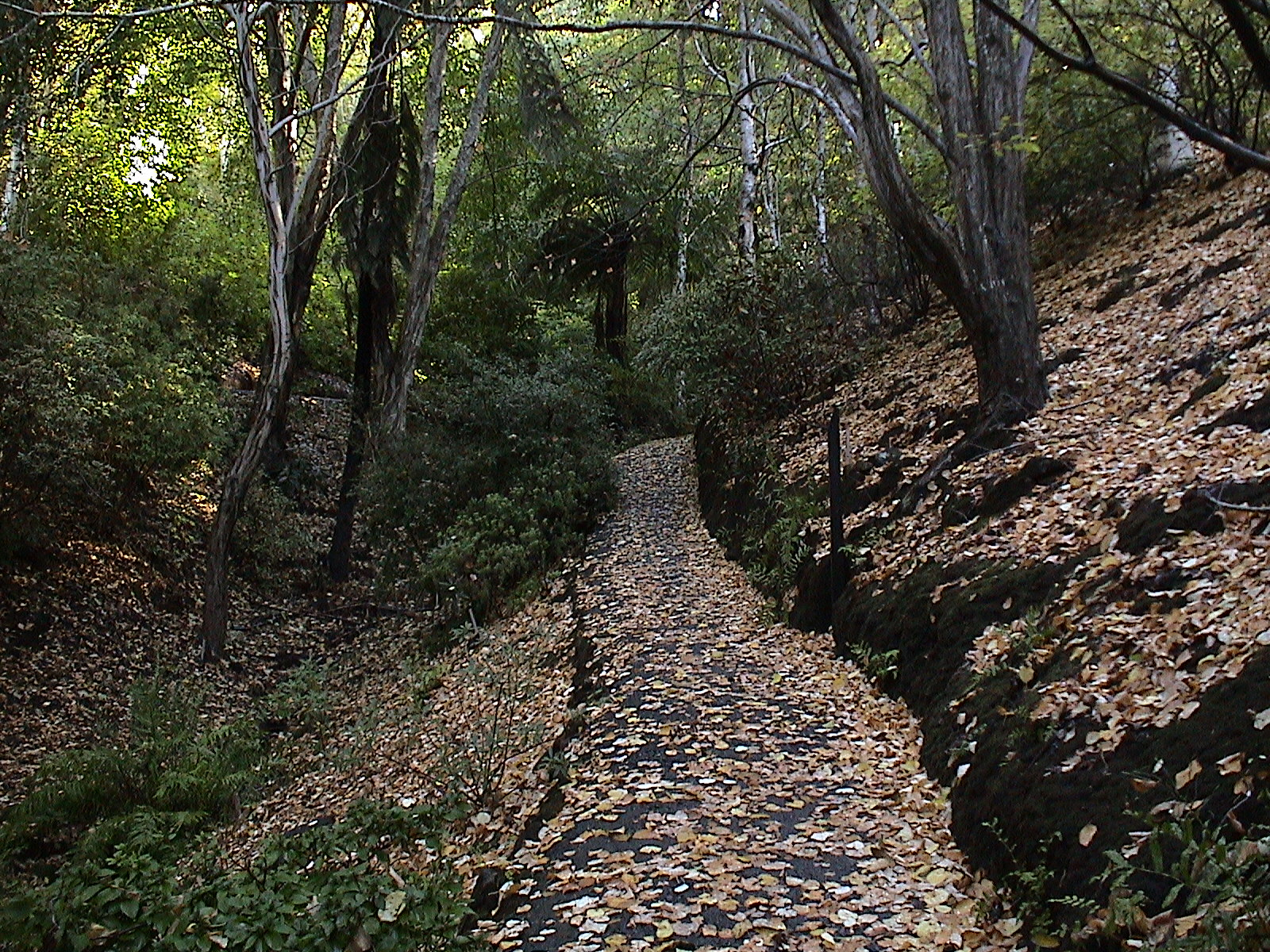
Fern Gully path, with fallen birch leaves

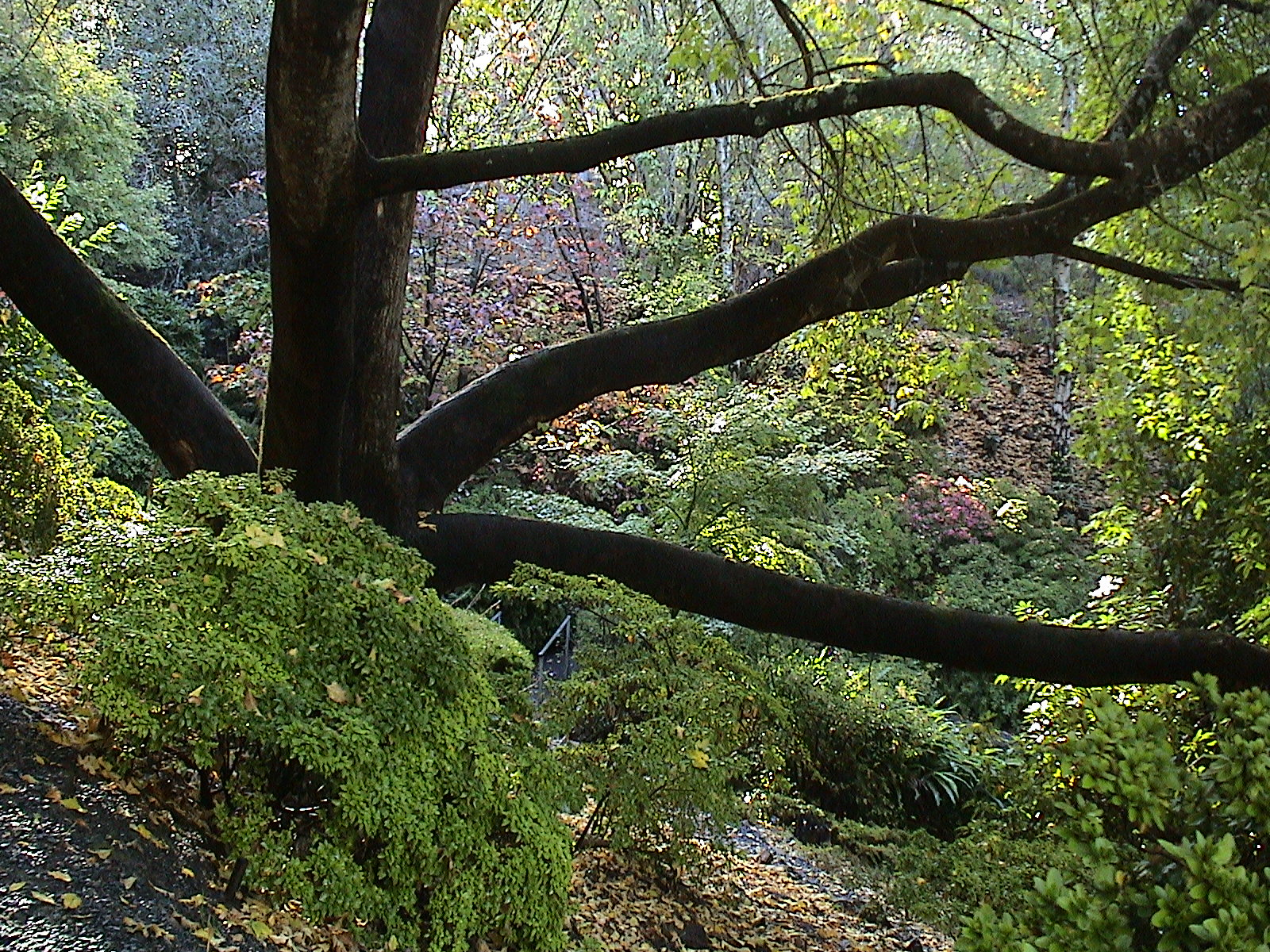
Upper section of Fern Gully path

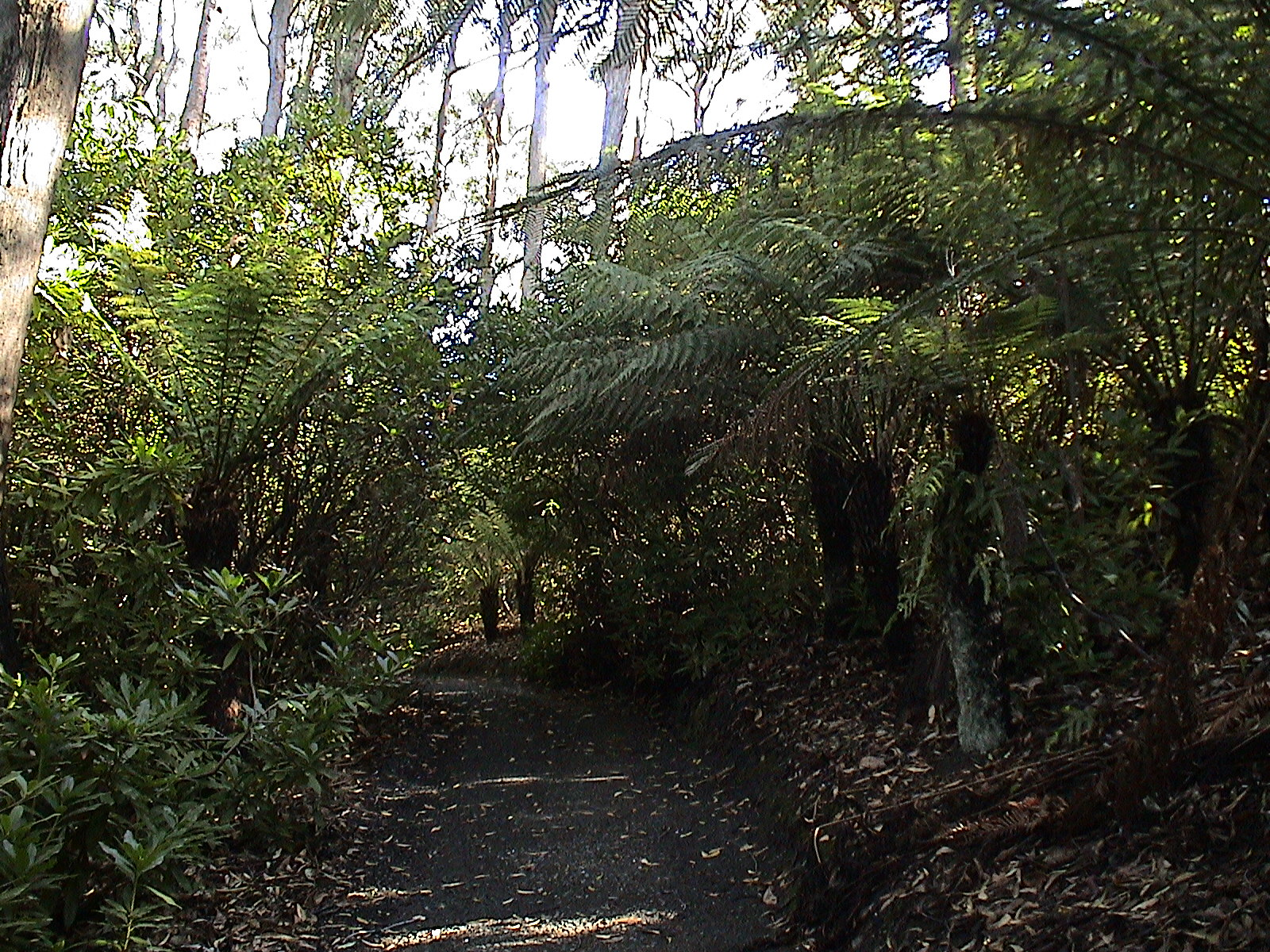
Tree ferns in Fern Gully

== See also ==
- List of Adelaide parks and gardens
