= Hancock (surname) =

Hancock is an English surname. It is derived from a given name, a variant of John (Johan) combined with the hypocoristic suffix -cok which came into fashion in the 13th century, from cok "cock", applied to "a young lad who strutted proudly like a cock". As a given name, Hanecok is recorded in the 13th century in the Hundred Rolls of Yorkshire. The Dictionary of American Family Names mentions an alternative Dutch etymology, from hanecoc "periwinkle".

An Irish variation is Handcock, as borne by William Handcock, 1st Viscount Castlemaine.

== People from America ==
- Allan Hancock (1875–1965), heir to Rancho La Brea, developer of Hancock Park, Los Angeles
- Clarence E. Hancock (1885–1948), politician of New York, namesake of the Syracuse Hancock International Airport
- Cornelia Hancock (1839–1926), nurse during the American Civil War
- Ebenezer Hancock (1741–1819), Deputy Paymaster-General of the Continental Army, brother of John
- Emerson Hancock (born 1999), baseball player
- George Allan Hancock (1875–1965), Californian oil magnate
- Greg Hancock (born 1970), motorcycle speedway rider
- H. Irving Hancock (Harrie Irving Hancock) (1868–1922), writer, mainly for children
- Hank Hancock (1936-2024), politician
- Harris Hancock (1867–1944), mathematician
- Henry Hancock (1822–1883), landowner in Southern California, owner of Rancho La Brea
- Herbie Hancock (born 1940), jazz musician
- James Hughes Hancock (1931–2020), Judge of the United States District Court for the Northern District of Alabama
- John Hancock (1737–1793), American Revolutionary; signatory to the United States Declaration of Independence; brother of Ebenezer
- Jordan Hancock (born 2003), American football player
- Josh Hancock (1978–2007), pitcher for the St. Louis Cardinals
- Keith Hancock (musician) (born 1980), music educator, Grammy award winner
- Levi W. Hancock (1803–1882), pioneer of Church of Jesus Christ of Latter-day Saints (Mormons)
- Luke Hancock (born 1990), basketball player
- Mary Louise Hancock (1920–2017), New Hampshire politician and activist
- Mel Hancock (1929–2011), U.S. Congressman from Missouri, best known for Missouri's Hancock Amendment
- Michael Hancock (Colorado politician) (born 1969), Mayor of Denver, Colorado
- Phil Hancock (1953–2024), professional golfer
- Tom Hancock (1948–2016), politician from Iowa
- Tommy Hancock (1929–2020), musician
- Trenton Doyle Hancock (born 1974), artist
- Vincent Hancock (born 1989), Olympic shooter
- Winfield Scott Hancock (1824–1886), Union general during the American Civil War

== People from Australia ==
- Bob Hancock (born 1942), Australian rules footballer
- H. R. Hancock "Captain" Hancock (1836–1919) mine superintendent of Moonta, South Australia
- Keith Hancock (historian) (1898–1988), historian
- Lang Hancock (1909–1992), iron ore magnate
- Michael Hancock (rugby league) (born 1969), rugby league footballer
- Robert Hancock (footballer) (1922–1973), Australian rules footballer

== People from Canada ==
- Mark Hancock, trade union activist
- Robert E. W. Hancock (born 1949), microbiologist

== People from Great Britain ==
- Albany Hancock (1806–1873), English naturalist, biologist, and supporter of Charles Darwin
- Anthony Hancock (publisher) (1947–2012), British publisher of right-wing material
- Frank Hancock (1859–1943), Wales international rugby captain
- Froude Hancock (1865–1933), English international rugby union player
- Graham Hancock (born 1950), non-fiction author and journalist
- Jake Hancock (1928–2004), geologist specialising in the Cretaceous period
- John Hancock (ornithologist) (1808–1890), British naturalist, ornithologist, taxidermist and landscape architect
- John Hancock (British politician) (1857–1940), British Liberal Party politician
- John Hancock (venereologist) (1923–1974), British venereologist and editor
- Ken Hancock (1937–2025), English footballer
- Martin Hancock (born 1970), actor
- Matt Hancock (born 1978), Conservative Party politician
- Nick Hancock (born 1962), actor and television presenter
- Sir Patrick Hancock (1914–1980), diplomat, ambassador to Israel, Norway, and Italy
- Prentis Hancock (1942–2025), British actor
- Ralph Hancock (cricketer) (1887–1914), English cricketer
- Ralph Hancock (landscape gardener) (1893–1950), Welsh garden designer
- Ray Hancock (1925–2007), English footballer, brother of Ken
- Robert Hancock (engraver) (1730–1817), British engraver and draughtsman
- Sam Hancock (born 1980), racing car driver
- Sheila Hancock (born 1933), actress and comedian
- Stephen Hancock (1925–2015), actor
- Thomas Hancock (inventor) (1786–1865), inventor
- Tony Hancock (1924–1968), comedian on Hancock's Half Hour radio and television series
- Tysoe Saul Hancock (1723–1775), English East India Company surgeon
- William Hancock (ophthalmologist) (1873–1910), English ophthalmologist and sportsman
- William John Hancock (1864–1931), telephone and X-ray pioneer in Western Australia

== Fictional characters ==
- Alexandra Hancock, or Aunt Alexandra, character in To Kill a Mockingbird
- Boa Hancock, character in the One Piece manga and anime series; in this instance, Hancock is a given name
- Emily Hancock, from Australian soap opera Neighbours
- Matt Hancock, from Australian soap opera Neighbours
- John Hancock, main character in the 2008 film Hancock
- John Hancock, character in the Fallout 4 video game
- Elvira Hancock, character in the movie Scarface

== See also ==
- Anthony Hancock (disambiguation)
- Emily Hancock (disambiguation)
- George Hancock (disambiguation)
- John Hancock (disambiguation)
- Michael Hancock (disambiguation)
- Thomas Hancock (disambiguation)
- William Hancock (disambiguation)
- Hancox
