= Robert Hancock =

Robert Hancock may refer to:

- Robert Hancock (footballer) (1922–1973), Australian rules footballer for St Kilda
- Robert Hancock (engraver) (1731–1817), English engraver
- Robert E. W. Hancock (born 1949), Canadian microbiologist
- Bob Hancock (born 1942), Australian rules footballer for North Melbourne
