= Suzana Straus =

Canadian chemist

Suzana K. Straus
- Born: Montreal
- Education: McGill University; ETH Zurich
- Scientific career
- Workplaces: University of British Columbia; University of Oxford; University of Pennsylvania
- Thesis: Development and application of techniques for improving resolution in solid state NMR of fully labelled biomolecules (1998)
- Website: Straus Group

Suzana K. Straus is a Canadian chemist who is a professor at the University of British Columbia. Her research focuses on host defense peptides (HDPs), as well as protein-protein and protein-ligand interactions.

== Early life and education ==
Straus is from Montreal. She graduated from McGill University with honours in 1993. She completed her doctoral research at ETH Zurich, where she developed new techniques to improve the resolution of solid-state nuclear magnetic resonance experiments. Her doctoral research was supported by the Natural Sciences and Engineering Research Council (NSERC).

== Research and career ==
Straus moved to the United States, where she was awarded an NSERC fellowship to join the University of Pennsylvania as a postdoctoral scholar. She was awarded a Dorothy Hodgkin Fellowship in 2000 and moved to the University of Oxford where she worked on structural studies of membrane proteins. In particular, she worked on solid-state magic-angle nuclear magnetic resonance techniques.

In 2002, Straus moved to Vancouver, where she was made a professor of chemistry at the University of British Columbia. Her research considers the identification of proteins in their native environments. She combines several spectroscopic and structural probes, including NMR, circular dichroism and differential scanning calorimetry. Her experimental research is used to determine structure-property relationships in biomolecules. She has studied the proteins associated with human herpesvirus 6 and human betaherpesvirus 7, and the interactions of these proteins with other binding partners. Straus has simultaneously looked to establish structure-function relationships in HDPs, as well as ways to deliver them.

== Selected publications ==
- Suzana Straus; Robert E W Hancock (3 March 2006). "Mode of action of the new antibiotic for Gram-positive pathogens daptomycin: comparison with cationic antimicrobial peptides and lipopeptides". Biochimica et Biophysica Acta. 1758 (9): 1215–1223. doi:10.1016/j.bbamem.2006.02.009. ISSN 0006-3002. PMID 16615993. Wikidata Q36449574.
- Prashant Kumar; Jayachandran N Kizhakkedathu; Suzana K Straus (19 January 2018). "Antimicrobial Peptides: Diversity, Mechanism of Action and Strategies to Improve the Activity and Biocompatibility In Vivo". Biomolecules. 8 (1). doi:10.3390/biom8010004. ISSN 2218-273X. PMC 5871973. PMID 29351202. Wikidata Q47723258.
- César de la Fuente-Núñez; Fany Reffuveille; Evan F Haney; Suzana Straus; Robert E W Hancock (May 2014). "Broad-spectrum anti-biofilm peptide that targets a cellular stress response". PLOS Pathogens. 10 (5) e1004152. doi:10.1371/journal.ppat.1004152. ISSN 1553-7366. PMC 4031209. PMID 24852171. Wikidata Q28539079.

== Personal life ==
Straus has two children. She has campaigned for the government to improve the provision of French speaking education for Canadian children. She served as President of the Federation of Francophone Parents of British Columbia and is active in the community.
