= Keith Hancock =

Keith Hancock may refer to:

- Sir Keith Hancock (historian) (1898–1988), Australian historian
- Keith Hancock (musician), two-time Grammy-nominated music educator, winner of the Grammy Music Educator of the Year award in 2017
- Keith Hancock (tennis) (born 1953), Australian tennis player
