= River Wye =

River in Wales and England

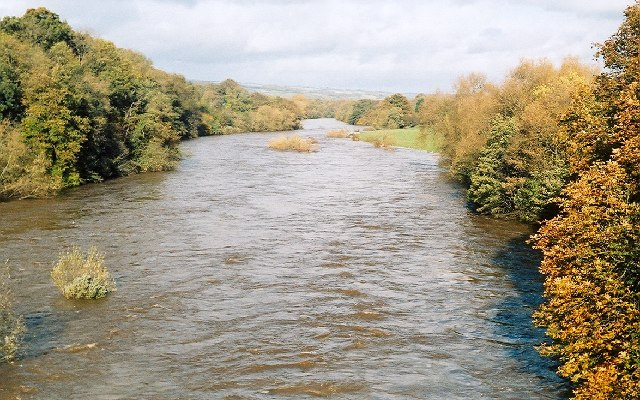
- The Wye at Hay-on-Wye

- Route of the Wye
- Native name: Afon Gwy (Welsh)

Location
- Country: Wales, England

Physical characteristics
- Source
  - location: Plynlimon
  - coordinates: 52°28′5.170″N 3°45′56.282″W
  - elevation: 690 m (2,260 ft)
- Mouth
  - location: Chepstow, Severn Estuary
  - coordinates: 51°36′36.086″N 2°39′42.423″W
  - elevation: 0 m (0 ft)
- Length: 250 km (160 mi)
- Basin size: 4,136 km^{2} (1,597 sq mi)

Basin features
- Tributaries
  - left: Marteg, Ithon, Lugg
  - right: Elan, Irfon, Monnow, Trothy

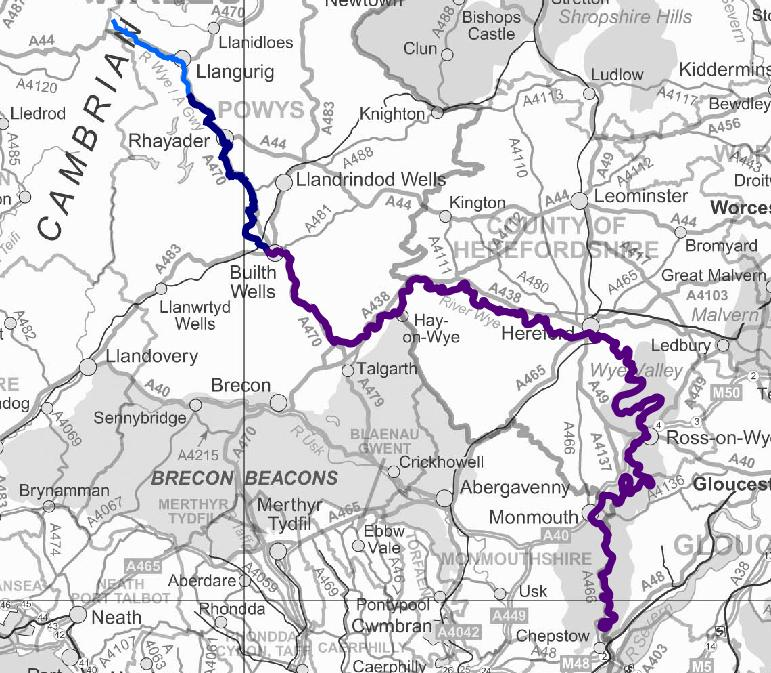
Map showing the River Wye from source to sea, excluding tributaries

The River Wye (/waɪ/; Welsh: Afon Gwy [ɡʊɨ̯]) is the fourth-longest river in the UK, stretching some 250 kilometres (155 miles) from its source on Plynlimon in Mid Wales to the Severn Estuary. The lower reaches of the river form part of the border between England and Wales. The Wye Valley (lower part) is designated a National Landscape (formerly an Area of Outstanding Natural Beauty). The Wye is important for nature conservation and recreation, and is affected by pollution.

== Etymology ==
The meaning of the river's name is not clear. Possibly the earliest reference to the name is Guoy in Nennius' early-9th-century Historia Brittonum and the modern Welsh name is Gwy, meaning wet or liquid. The Wye was much later given a Latin name, Vaga, an adjective meaning 'wandering'. The Tithe map of 1844 references a Vagas Field in both Whitchurch and Chepstow. Philologists such as Edward Lye and Joseph Bosworth in the 18th and early 19th centuries suggested an Old English derivation from wæġ, 'wave'.

== Description ==
The source of the Wye is in the Cambrian Mountains at Plynlimon, just 2 miles (3.2 km) southwest of the source of the Severn. Although it rises only about 12 miles (19 km) from the Irish Sea, its course, at first, leads inland. It flows through or past several towns and villages, including Rhayader, Builth Wells, Hay-on-Wye, Hereford (the only city on the River Wye), Ross-on-Wye, Symonds Yat, Monmouth and Tintern, meeting the Severn Estuary just below Chepstow. The lower 16 miles (26 km) of the river, from Redbrook to Chepstow, form the border between England and Wales.

=== Tributaries ===
The Wye's tributaries include the rivers Lugg, Elan, Dulas, Irfon, Marteg, Monnow, Trothy, Ithon, Llynfi, Letton Lake, Tarennig (the Wye's first tributary) and Bidno. A fuller list is available at the relevant section of the list of rivers of Wales

== Conservation ==
River Wye (Lower Wye)
- Site of Special Scientific Interest
- Grid reference: ST544912 to SO230429
- Interest: Biological/Geological
- Area: England: 1,159.6 ha (2,865 acres); Wales: 245.2 ha (606 acres); Total: 1,404.8 ha (3,471 acres)
- Notification date: 1978

The River Wye is protected by two Sites of Special Scientific Interest, one covering the Upper Wye (Gwy Uchaf) above Hay-on-Wye, and one covering the Lower Wye (Gwy Isaf) downstream to Chepstow. The criteria for inclusion of the river as an SSSI include geology, topography, flora, mammals, invertebrates, fish and birdlife, as the river and its tributaries constitute a large linear ecosystem. The Lower Wye SSSI is itself divided into seven units of assessment set by Natural England, and administrative responsibilities are shared between the councils of Powys, Herefordshire, Gloucestershire, and Monmouthshire. The Wye abuts a range of other SSSIs in England and Wales, including the Upper Wye Gorge and Lower Wye Gorge.

It is also a Special Area of Conservation and one of the most important rivers in the UK for nature conservation. It is an important migration route and wildlife corridor, as well as a key breeding area for many nationally and internationally important species. The river supports a range of species and habitats covered by European Directives and those listed under Schedule 5 of the Wildlife and Countryside Act 1981. In Powys the river lies within the Radnorshire Environmentally Sensitive Area. Much of the lower valley is designated a National Landscape.

=== Salmon ===
The Lower Wye has been designated as a salmonid fishery under the European Community Freshwater Fish Directive (78/659/EC).

The Wye was particularly famous for its large "spring" salmon that had spent three or more years at sea before returning to spawn. They used to enter the river between January and June and sometimes reached weights of over 50 pounds (23 kg), the largest recorded being 59 lb 8 oz (27.0 kg) landed after a long fight by Miss Doreen Davey from the Cowpond Pool at Winforton on 13 March 1923. The last recorded 50 lb (23 kg) rod-caught salmon from the Wye was taken in 1963 by Donald Parrish and weighed 51 lb 8 oz (23.4 kg). Since the early 2000s the spring catch has been steadily recovering and salmon of over 35 lb (16 kg) have been reported every year since 2011.

== Pollution ==
Pollution has severely affected the river; the Wye does not meet European and national standards on river health. This has been happening for some time; a Nutrient Management Board (NMB) was established in 2014 to address the issues. Pollution from chicken and dairy farms has become so bad the Wye has been used as an example of river pollution in the UK on Countryfile and in several national newspapers.

The Wye is dying at astonishing, heartbreaking speed. When I canoed it 10 years ago, the stones were clean. Now they are so slimy that you can scarcely stand up. In hot weather, the entire river stinks of chicken sh**, from the 10 million birds being reared in the catchment..

— George Monbiot

This pollution causes algal blooms several times a year with increasing frequency and length, depleting the oxygen in the water causing fish such as brown trout, chub and barbel, as well as aquatic invertebrates and plants, to suffocate to death. Fish and aquatic invertebrates are the main food source for otters, kingfishers, herons, eels and other protected species.

If this goes on, we will lose everything that we treasure about the Wye. It will turn a horrible, ugly green every time it gets sunny. The fish will go, and they will be followed by our kingfishers, our dippers and our herons.

— Simon Evans, Wye and Usk Foundation

Along with many other rivers the Wye is being heavily polluted by manure from the 10 million free range chickens for eggs and meat in intensive poultry units (IPUs) in Powys and Herefordshire, contaminating the Wye's tributaries. As of April 2020, there were over 110 registered IPUs in Powys, each with over 40,000 birds (smaller IPUs need not be registered).

In addition, runoff from dairy farms, farm slurry and silage liquor are entering the Wye. A study by the Welsh Government found that only 1% of farm slurry stores in Wales met regulations and that farms were purposely spreading slurry on fields before high rainfall, leading to increased runoff into waterways. An investigation by Greenpeace found that Environment Agency staff cuts from austerity had reduced pollution inspections by up to one third. An internal report by the Environment Agency showed that the use of a “voluntary approach” by government was leading to increased levels of river pollution across the UK. Powys County Council approved the construction of 20 new free-range chicken sheds in 2019 and as of February 2022 continues to license new chicken farms. In addition to problems with the riverine environment, this is causing air quality issues. Pollution from the chicken factory farms is estimated to have killed 90% to 97% of the river's water crowfoot beds, and 3,000 tonnes (3,300 tons) more phosphate than plants can absorb is released in the River Wye's catchment every year.

In February 2022, it was declared at a meeting of the River Wye Nutrient Management Board that

The River Wye will be in irreversibly worse condition within two years unless swift action is taken

— Simon Evans, Wye and Usk Foundation

In March 2023, a High Court claim was brought against the Environment Agency by environmental charity River Action for failing to take action to protect the Wye from environmental pollution, after a Lancaster University study found that 60-70% of phosphates in the river come from agriculture.

== History ==
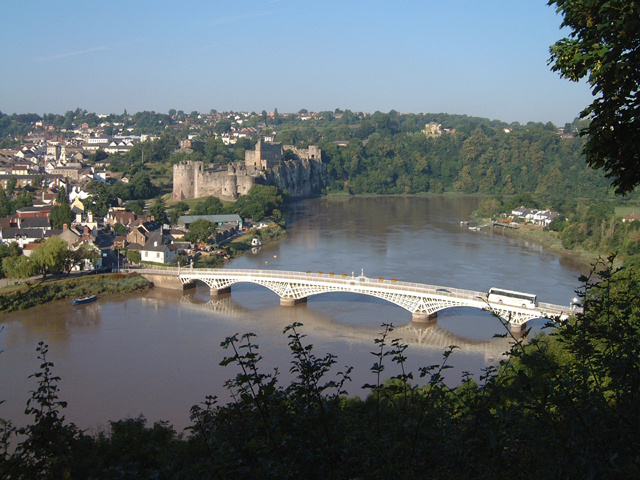
The Wye at Chepstow, showing the castle and the road bridge linking Monmouthshire (on the left) with Gloucestershire

The Romans constructed a bridge of wood and stone just upstream of present-day Chepstow, some remains of which were found in the river bed during an archaeological dig in 1911. The River Wye is tidal from its junction with the River Severn for about 15 miles (24 km) to Bigsweir, where a band of hard rock forms a natural weir across the river. The tidal range on this lower section is huge, with water levels rising by up to 50 feet (15 m) on some spring tides, but despite the risks of navigating such a river, it has been used since Roman times to transport coal from the Forest of Dean, cider from Hereford, together with Italian wine, iron, stone and timber.

When compared to many of the long rivers in Britain, the Wye is quite steep, with a rise of 1.93 feet per mile (0.365 m per km) between its junction with the River Severn and Monmouth, and a rise of 2.4 feet per mile (0.455 m per km) between there and Hereford. In the summer months, the river level at Hereford is 152 feet (46 m) above ordnance datum (AOD), and Hereford is about 70 miles (110 km) from the river mouth. For navigation to occur, some form of management of river levels was required. Early records are fragmentary, but it appears that the river was used to transport iron from the Forest of Dean for Edward the Confessor's ships in the 11th century, and in 1171 and 1172, iron was supplied to Henry II for his invasion of Ireland. From the 13th century, the records are clearer, and iron from forges at Bicknor, Lydbrook, Monmouth and Carey Mills was transported by river. During the reign of Edward I, a common right of navigation on the Wye was recorded, with the channel to be kept free of weirs and other obstructions. Where these already existed, they were to be demolished at the owner's expense. Documents from 1561 and 1571 concerning water mills and weirs show that the river was used for navigation at the time.

Rivers Wye and Lugg Navigation Act 1662
- Act of Parliament
- Parliament of England
- Long title: An Act for making navigable the Rivers of Wye and Lugg, and the Rivers and Brooks running into the same, in the Counties of Hereford, Gloucester, and Monmouth.
- Citation: 14 Cha. 2. c. 15 Pr.
- Territorial extent: England and Wales

Dates
- Royal assent: 19 May 1662
- Commencement: 7 January 1662 (Note: Start of session.)
- Repealed: 16 December 2002
Other legislation
Amended by	Rivers Wye and Lugg Navigation Act 1695; Wye and Lugg Navigation and Horse Towing-path Act 1809
Repealed by	Gloucester Harbour Revision (Constitution) Order 2002

Status: Repealed

In 1622, a petition was raised by the counties of Gloucestershire, Herefordshire and Monmouthshire, together with the city of Hereford, that the river should be cleared of obstructions that made fishing and navigation difficult. A commission of sewers was appointed, but seems to have done very little, since most of the weirs belonged to the king. There were seven weirs on the river in 1641, to provide water power for mills and forges. During Cromwell's Commonwealth period, proposals were made to improve the river for navigation by building flash locks at the weirs, and dredging the channel to make it deeper. Although there were arguments for and against the proposals, Sir William Sandys was appointed in 1662 to oversee making the Wye and the River Lugg navigable. He had previously worked on the Warwickshire Avon to make that navigable. Some £1,300 had already been raised in the country, but it is unclear what he did with the money. He was assisted by Henry and Windsor Sandys, and they were given powers to construct a towing path, 4 feet (1.2 m) wide on both sides of the river, to allow boats to be hauled upstream. Although tolls could be charged, they also had to maintain the right of free passage which was long established on the river. Twenty commissioners were appointed, ten from Hereford, five from Gloucester and five from Monmouth. All weirs were to include an opening, so that salmon and other fish could migrate along the river.

The scheme involved the construction of flash locks in channels cut to bypass the weirs, a system which Sandys had used with success on the Avon, but the Wye was a much faster flowing river, which meant that the solution was impracticable and very costly. It had been abandoned by 1668, as maintenance costs made the operation of boats unprofitable, and a new scheme, proposed by Lord Coningsby of Hampton Court Castle, Herefordshire was to be implemented. All fishing weirs and mill weirs would be bought and demolished, while Sandys' locks would be abandoned. The river bed would also be deepened where necessary. The cost of buying the weirs would be raised by a tax on the county, and it was estimated that the river would be navigable for about 200 days per year. At the time there were weirs supplying six fulling mills and three corn mills at Hereford, and another nine elsewhere, at Fownhope, Hancox, Carey, Foy and Wilton. There were another nine derelict weirs above Monmouth, and five below the town.

Rivers Wye and Lugg Act 1695
- Act of Parliament
- Parliament of England
- Long title: https://www.legislation.gov.uk/aep/Will3/7-8/14/contents/enacted
- Citation: 7 & 8 Will. 3. c. 14
- Territorial extent: England and Wales

Dates
- Royal assent: 7 March 1696
- Commencement: 22 November 1695
- Repealed: 16 December 2002
Other legislation
Amends	Rivers Wye and Lugg Navigation Act 1662
Amended by	Rivers Wye and Lugg Navigation Act 1726; Wye and Lugg Navigation and Horse Towing-path Act 1809
Repealed by	Gloucester Harbour Revision (Constitution) Order 2002

Status: Repealed

Text of statute as originally enacted

Rivers Wye and Lugg Navigation Act 1726
- Act of Parliament
- Parliament of Great Britain
- Long title: An Act for explaining and amending an Act passed in the Seventh and Eighth Years of the Reign of His late Majesty King William the Third, intituled, "An Act for making navigable the Rivers Wye and Lug, in the County of Hereford;" and for making the same more effectual.
- Citation: 13 Geo. 1. c. 34
- Territorial extent: Great Britain

Dates
- Royal assent: 15 May 1727
- Commencement: 17 January 1727
- Repealed: 16 December 2002
Other legislation
Amends	Rivers Wye and Lugg Navigation Act 1695
Amended by	Wye and Lugg Navigation and Horse Towing-path Act 1809; Gloucester Harbour Revision (Constitution) Order 2002

Status: Partially repealed

Text of statute as originally enacted

Wye and Lugg Navigation and Horse Towing-path Act 1809
- Act of Parliament
- Parliament of the United Kingdom
- Long title: An Act for amending several Acts for making navigable the Rivers Wye and Lugg, in the County of Hereford, and for making a Horse Towing Path on certain Parts of the Banks of the said River Wye.
- Citation: 49 Geo. 3. c. lxxviii
- Territorial extent: United Kingdom

Dates
- Royal assent: 20 May 1809
- Repealed: 16 December 2002
Other legislation
Amends	Rivers Wye and Lugg Navigation Act 1662; Rivers Wye and Lugg Navigation Act 1695; Rivers Wye and Lugg Navigation Act 1726
Repealed by	Gloucester Harbour Revision (Constitution) Order 2002

Status: Repealed

Text of statute as originally enacted

Lord Coningsby's proposals were enshrined in the Rivers Wye and Lugg Navigation Act 1695 (7 & 8 Will. 3. c. 14), an act of the Parliament of England which authorised the County of Hereford to buy up and demolish the mills on the Wye and Lugg. All locks and weirs were to be removed, except that at New Weir forge below Goodrich, which survived until about 1815. By 1727, around £18,000 had been raised to carry out the work, and thirteen weirs in Herefordshire had been bought and removed. Some work had also been carried out on the Lugg, but much of it was damaged by flooding soon afterwards. One unexpected consequence of removing the weirs was that water levels dropped, resulting in there being a number of shoals that boats now had to negotiate. Another act of Parliament was obtained, the Rivers Wye and Lugg Navigation Act 1726 (13 Geo. 1. c. 34), which appointed new trustees, and allowed them to authorise the construction of mills and weirs at locations which would assist navigation. In 1763, James Taylor proposed the construction of 22 weirs, each with an associated pound lock, to make the river fully navigable, but the scheme was not implemented. When it looked likely that the Herefordshire and Gloucestershire Canal would not reach Hereford, there were calls to further improve the Wye. At the time, boats were hauled by gangs of ten or eleven men, but men were in short supply, and a towing path for horses was suggested. William Jessop carried out a survey, and the towing path was authorised by the Wye and Lugg Navigation and Horse Towing-path Act 1809 (49 Geo. 3. c. lxxviii). A company was formed to build 37 miles (60 km) of path from Lydbrook to Hereford, and to maintain ferries at five points where the path crossed from one side of the river to the other.

Evidence given in Parliament during the passage of the bill stated that some 10,000 tons of coal were moved along the river to Hereford each year, with 3,000 tons of other commodities. Another 4,000 tons of lime and other goods were delivered to various points along the river. Progress on the project was rapid, and local newspapers announced the arrival of two barges in Hereford on 23 January 1811, each towed by two horses. Carriage of coal to Hereford became easier following the opening of the Severn and Wye Tramroad in 1813, which brought coal to the river bank at Bishop's Wood. A steam tug was trialled on the river in 1825, but although it proved to be successful, it was sold due to the difficulty of finding suitable barges for it to tow. Passenger services became a feature of the river from 1835, with boats running between Ross-on-Wye, Monmouth and Chepstow, later extended to include Goodrich and Tintern. The river was also navigable above Hereford, as far as Hay-on-Wye, although only when there was sufficient water, and a system of ropes and pulleys were used to allow boats to negotiate the rapids at Monnington on Wye.

Money was spent several times improving the River Lugg from Leominster to its confluence with the Wye at Mordiford, but its navigation is likely to have been difficult. The Herefordshire and Gloucestershire Canal reached Hereford in 1845, providing an alternative way to supply the town with coal, and trade tailed off with the opening of the Newport, Abergavenny and Hereford Railway in 1854, and the Hereford, Ross and Gloucester Railway in the following year. After the Wye Valley Railway opened in 1876, the river ceased to be navigable above Brockweir, and as the river silted up, Tintern became the normal upper limit for navigation. The river is still used by pleasure craft.

The river was unusual in that it was a Free Navigation from its source to Hay-on-Wye, a distance of 82 miles (132 km). It ceased to be free after the modifications by Sandys in the 17th century, but this right was re-established by the 1695 Act, which stated:

Therefore be it enacted that the rivers Wye and Lugg may be henceforth accounted, deemed and taken to be free and common rivers for all to make use of for carrying and conveying of all passenger goods, wares and commodities by boats, barges, lighters and other vessels whatsoever.

Wye Navigation Order 2002 (Note: Section 1.)
- Statutory Instrument
- Parliament of the United Kingdom
- Citation: SI 2002/1998
- Territorial extent: United Kingdom

Dates
- Made: 25 July 2002
- Commencement: 15 August 2002
Other legislation
Repeals/revokes	Rivers Wye and Lugg Navigation Act 1662; Rivers Wye and Lugg Navigation Act 1695; Rivers Wye and Lugg Navigation Act 1726; Wye and Lugg Navigation and Horse Towing-path Act 1809
Made under	Transport and Works Act 1992

Status: Current legislation

Text of statute as originally enacted

Text of the Wye Navigation Order 2002 as in force today (including any amendments) within the United Kingdom, from legislation.gov.uk.

The National Rivers Authority brought a case before the High Court in 1995, to enable them to impose bylaws on the river. Shortly afterwards, they were replaced by the Environment Agency, and in 2002, the Wye Navigation Order 2002 (SI 2002/1998) was enacted. This confirmed the right of navigation on both the Wye and the Lugg, but established the Environment Agency as the navigation authority for the rivers. It also banned the construction of locks and weirs, so neither river is likely to be navigable by motor boats under normal circumstances. Despite this, in 1989, Frank Barton and Pat Hucket successfully navigated a 124-foot (38 m) 230-ton barge up the river to Hereford. Travelling time on the river was 20 hours, but this was spread over six months, as they had to wait for just the right water levels. The vessel was renamed Wye Invader during the journey. In March 2019, Barton returned to the river, navigating a narrowboat called Wye Invader Two from Sharpness to Monmouth Rowing Club and back again. The trip was possible because there was about 7 feet (2.1 m) of flood water in the river, enabling the boat to pass over the weirs and obstructions.

Nelson travelled down the Wye in 1802, along with Emma, Lady Hamilton and her husband, Sir William Hamilton. They sailed from Ross-on-Wye to Monmouth, to be greeted by a cannonade and the band of the Monmouthshire Militia playing "See, the Conquering Hero Comes". Nelson expressed surprise that he was known at "such a little gut of a river as the Wye".

== In Culture ==
=== Welsh mythology ===
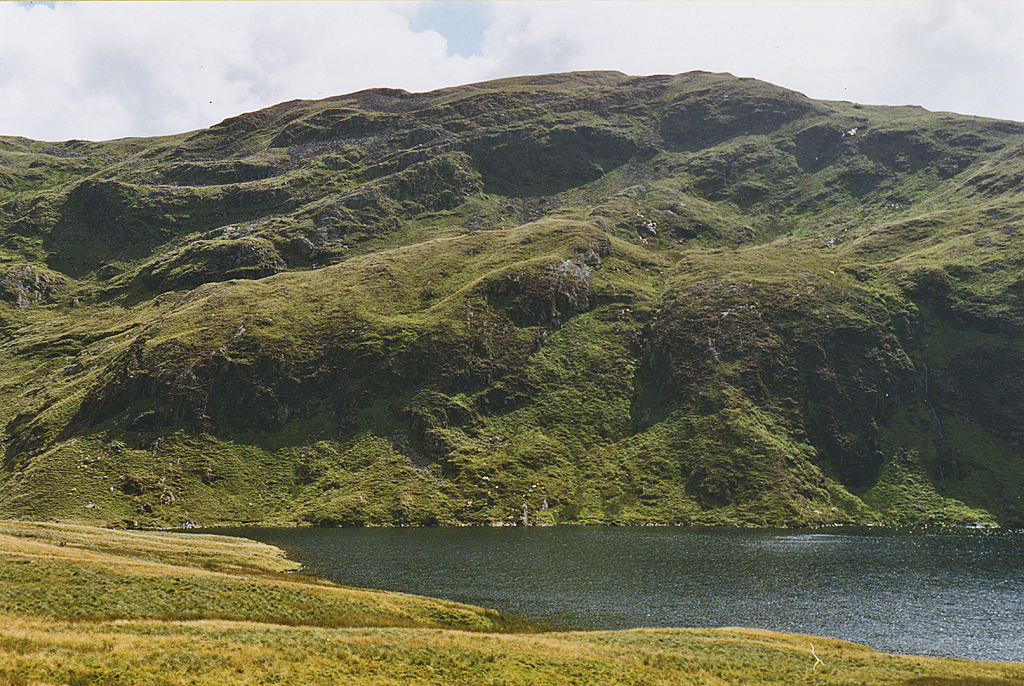
"Father Plynlimon", the mountain from which "the three sisters", Gwy, Hafren and Rheidolyn make their way to the sea

The river is one of "the three sisters" of Welsh mythology, first recorded by John Rhŷs as a legend told to him in his youth in 1840s Ceredigion. In the legend, "Gwy" and her two sisters, Rheidolyn (the river Rheidol) and Hafren (the river Severn) all rise from "Father Plynlimon" (the mountain upon which the three rivers have their sources), with each sister choosing a different direction to make their way to the sea.

The legend was retold throughout the 19th and 20th centuries, with Arthur Granville Bradley giving a detailed version and analysis in 1920. Bradley states that the god of the mountain was indeed father to three daughters, however in this version each daughter is given a single day to reach the sea, with their father promising all the territory they can cover before dark as a dowry. Gwy awakes to find that her sister Hafren has already started her journey and headed heading east, taking what is the longest route to the sea. Gwy decides that her best chance to win the race is to take a more direct route through the more difficult southern terrain. Gwy's choice of route sees her catch up with and join her sister, just before they reach the Severn Sea at the day's end.

=== Poetry ===
The river has been a subject for bards and poets for centuries. The Romantic poet William Wordsworth includes an apostrophe to the Wye in his famous poem "Lines Written a Few Miles above Tintern Abbey", published in 1798 in Lyrical Ballads:

How oft, in spirit, have I turned to thee,
O sylvan Wye! thou wanderer thro' the woods,
How often has my spirit turned to thee!

== Navigation and sport ==
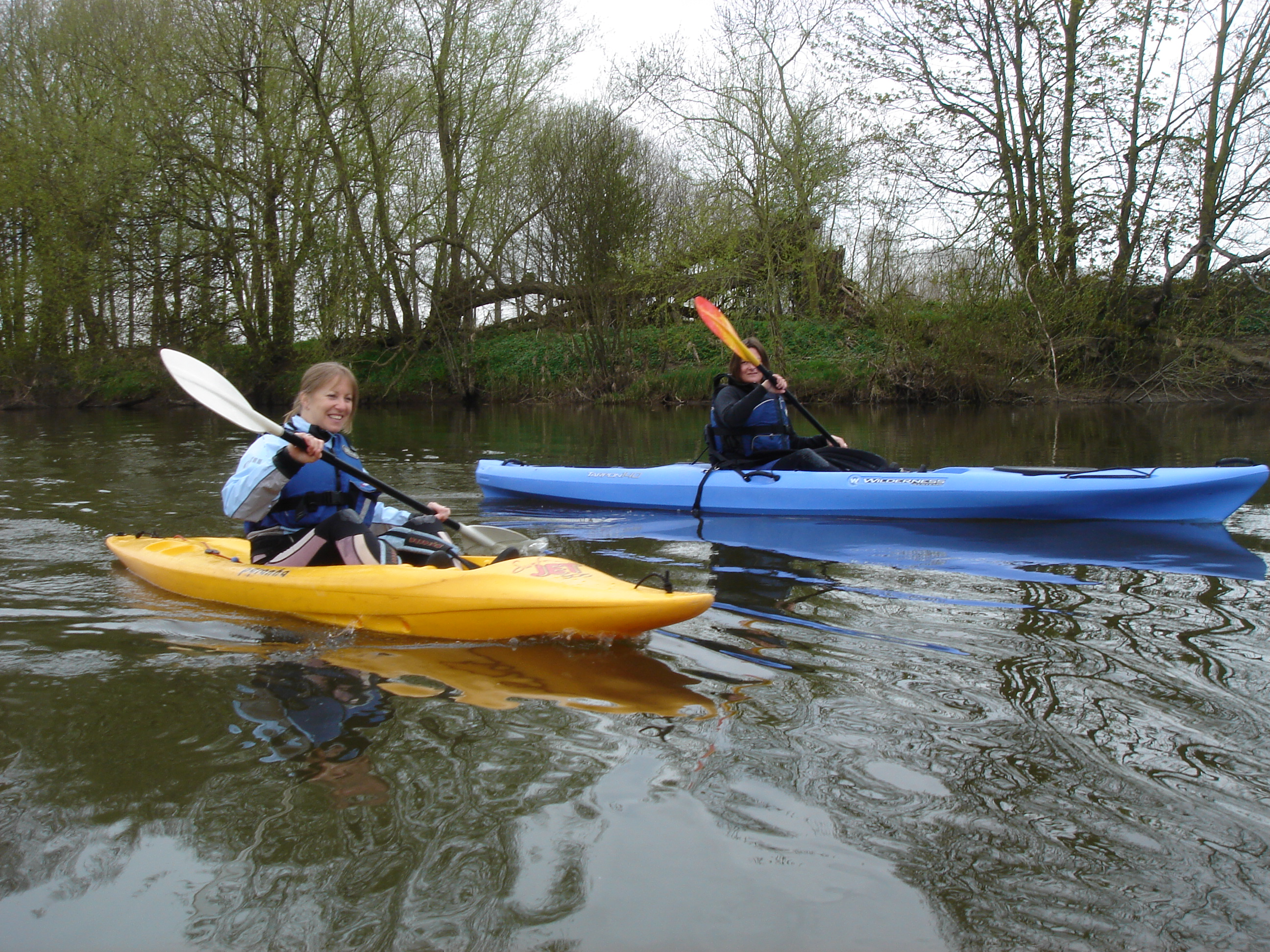
Kayaking near Hay-on-Wye

The Environment Agency is the navigation authority for the river. The normal tidal limit (NTL) of the river is Bigsweir and navigation below this point is under the control of the Gloucester Harbour Trustees as Competent Harbour Authority. There is a public right of navigation up to Hay-on-Wye, and canoes are generally permitted on the next 5.5 miles (8.9 km) up to Glasbury, so long as they do not disturb anglers.

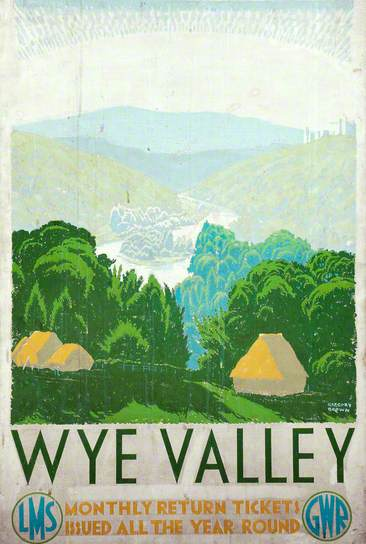
A railway poster advertising the Wye Valley as a tourist destination. Date is before 1942.

The River Wye provides for canoeing and kayaking as it has sections suitable for all ranges of skills and free access all the way downstream from Hay to Hereford and Monmouth, and the tidal Wye to Chepstow and the Severn Estuary. There are a wide range of canoe hire and supervised trips, as well as campsites at key points on the river. Symonds Yat has a particularly popular series of rapids that was purchased by the British Canoe Union in 2003 to preserve the rapids for recreational use, canoe trips through the rapids stop next at Monmouth. There are three rowing clubs on the river at Hereford, Ross-on-Wye and Monmouth. Annual regattas are held at Ross-on-Wye and Monmouth for rowers and scullers of all abilities, next to the local rowing club. In 2017 more than 600 people took to the River Wye in inflatables ranging from dinghies to paddling pools during the event WYE FLOAT, opened by former Olympic ski-jumper Eddie the Eagle.

Walkers can take the Wye Valley Walk which follows the route of the River Wye from Coed Hafren, near Plynlimon, to Chepstow along a series of well-maintained way-marked paths. A viewpoint near The Biblins on the Wye is known as 'Three Counties View', the meeting place of the counties of Herefordshire, Gloucestershire and Monmouthshire.

== 2020 and 2021 floods ==
In February 2020, Wales and parts of England endured extremely heavy rainfall from Storm Dennis, following shortly after Storm Ciara. The central part of South Wales was particularly affected. The river over-topped its banks and caused flooding in several areas, including Hay-on-Wye, Hereford, Ross-on-Wye and Monmouth. Much of Hereford was flooded, with homes inundated. Churches and leisure centres were opened to accommodate evacuated residents. The river at Monmouth reached its highest level ever recorded.

In January 2021, the Wye catchment suffered flooding as a result of Storm Christoph.

== Views of the river ==
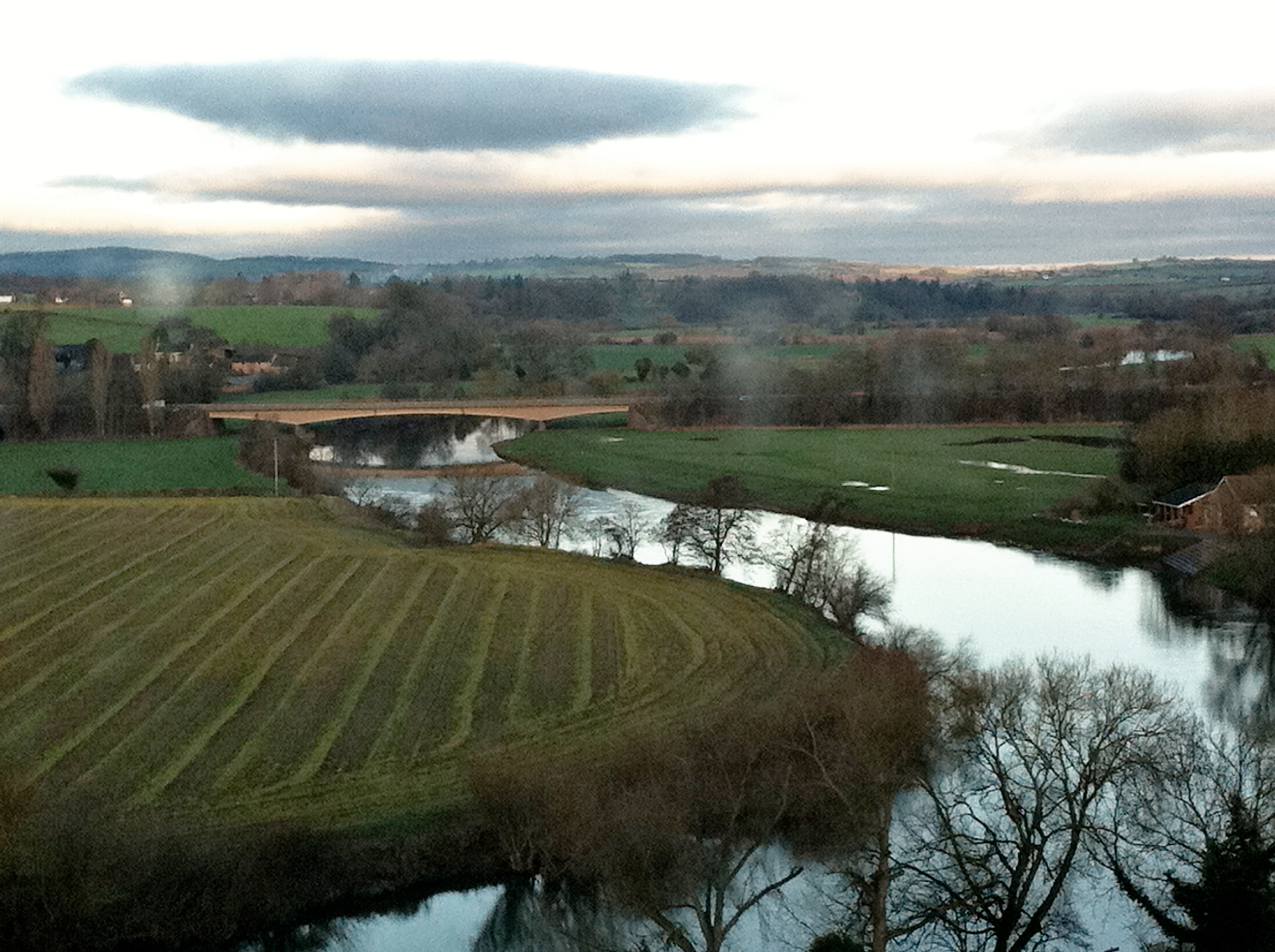
Ross-on-Wye

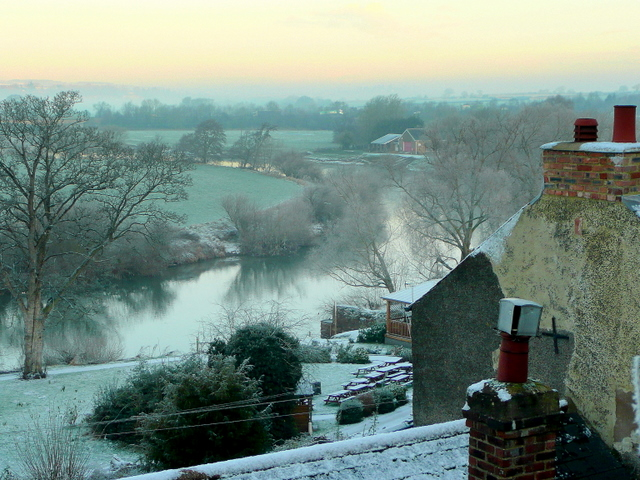
Ross-on-Wye

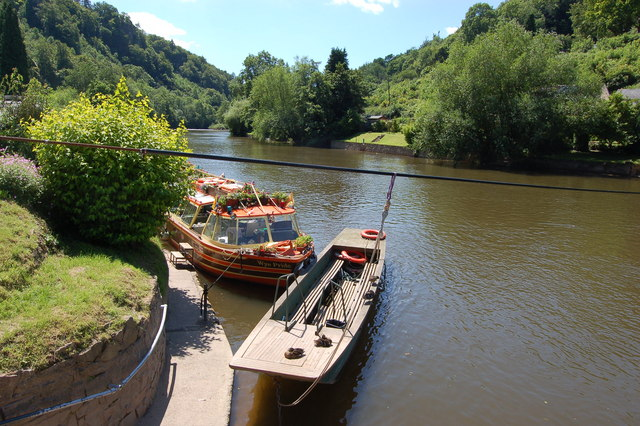
Water transport at Symonds Yat

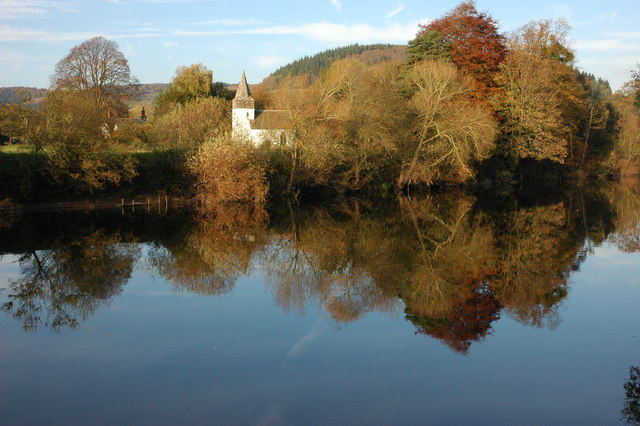
St Peter's Church, Dixton

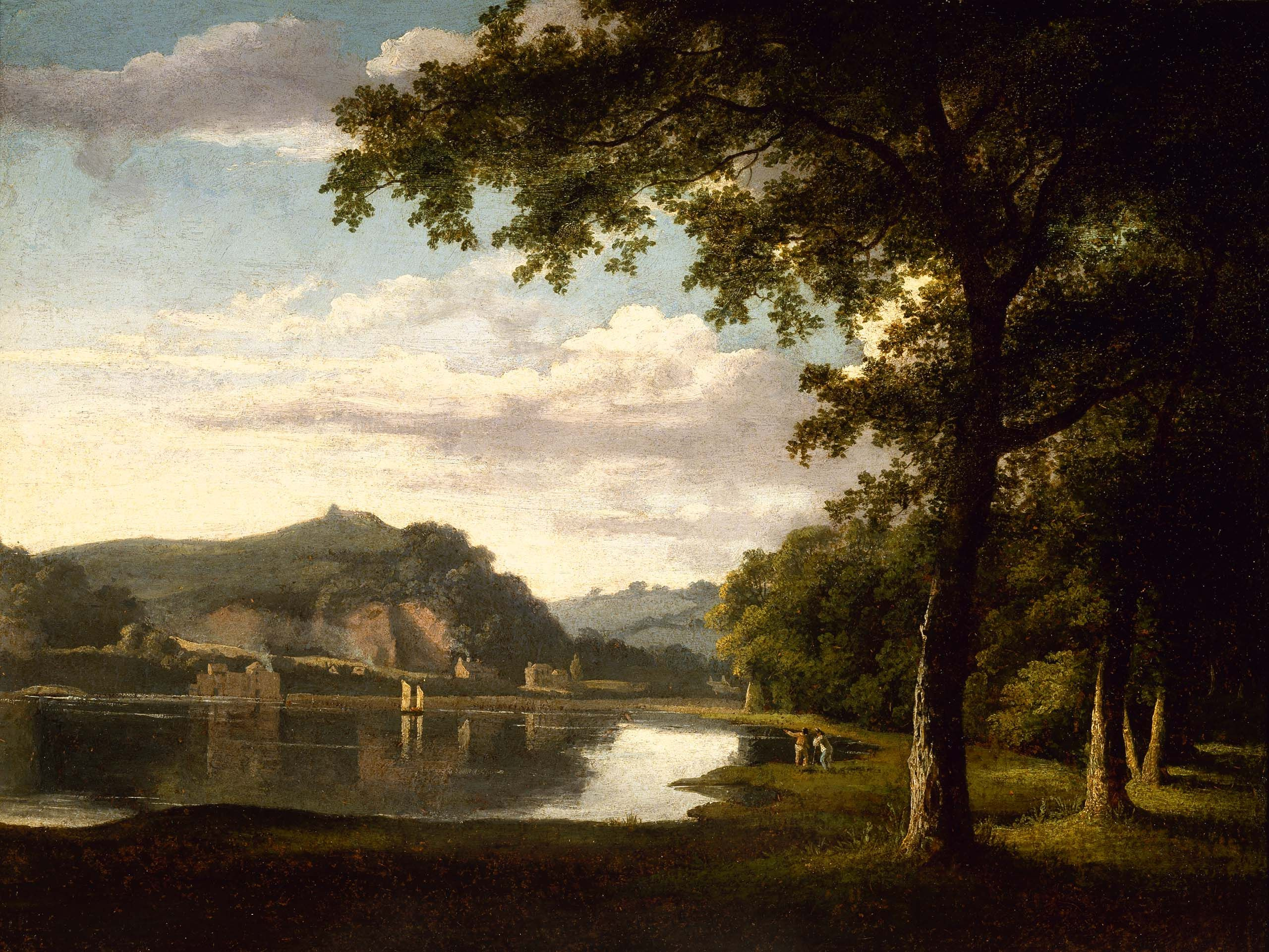
Landscape with View on the River Wye, Thomas Jones, c. 1772

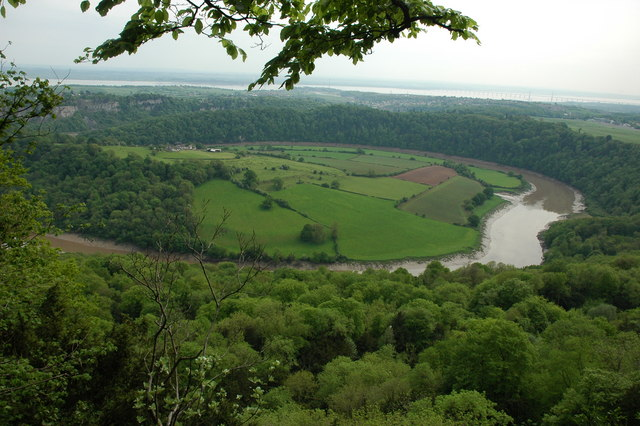
Eagle's Nest, Wyndcliff

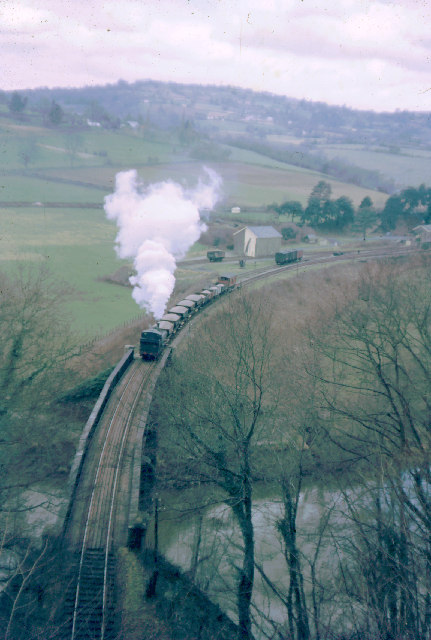
A steam-hauled stone train crossing the river after departing from Tintern railway station in 1963

== Bridges on the river ==
There are some 58 bridges and crossings of the river, including 15 Grade II listed bridges, one Grade II* listed bridge and three Grade I listed bridges.

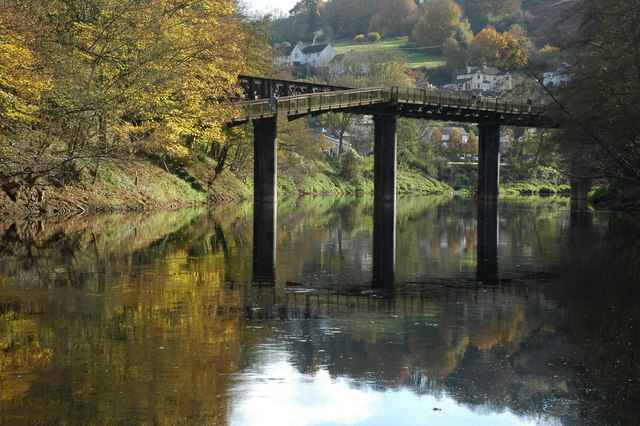
Old railway bridge at Redbrook

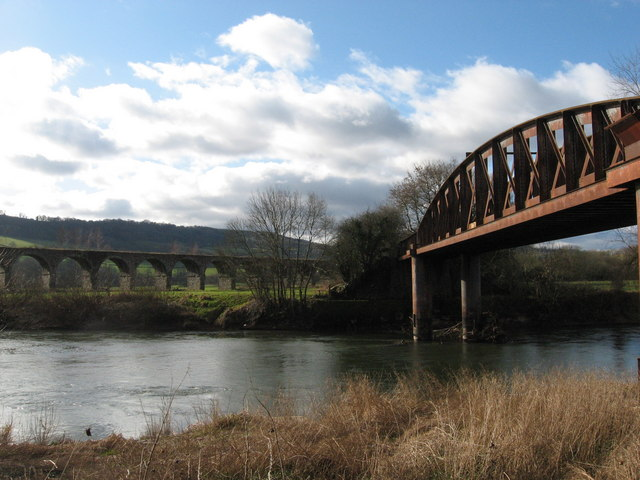
Monmouth Viaduct and Duke of Beaufort Bridge at Monmouth

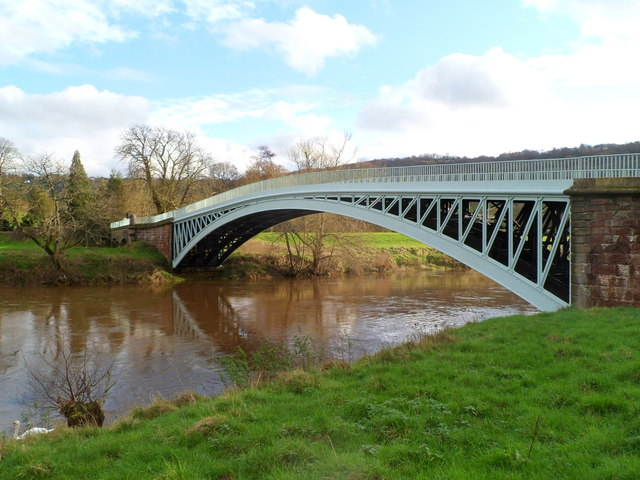
Bigsweir Bridge

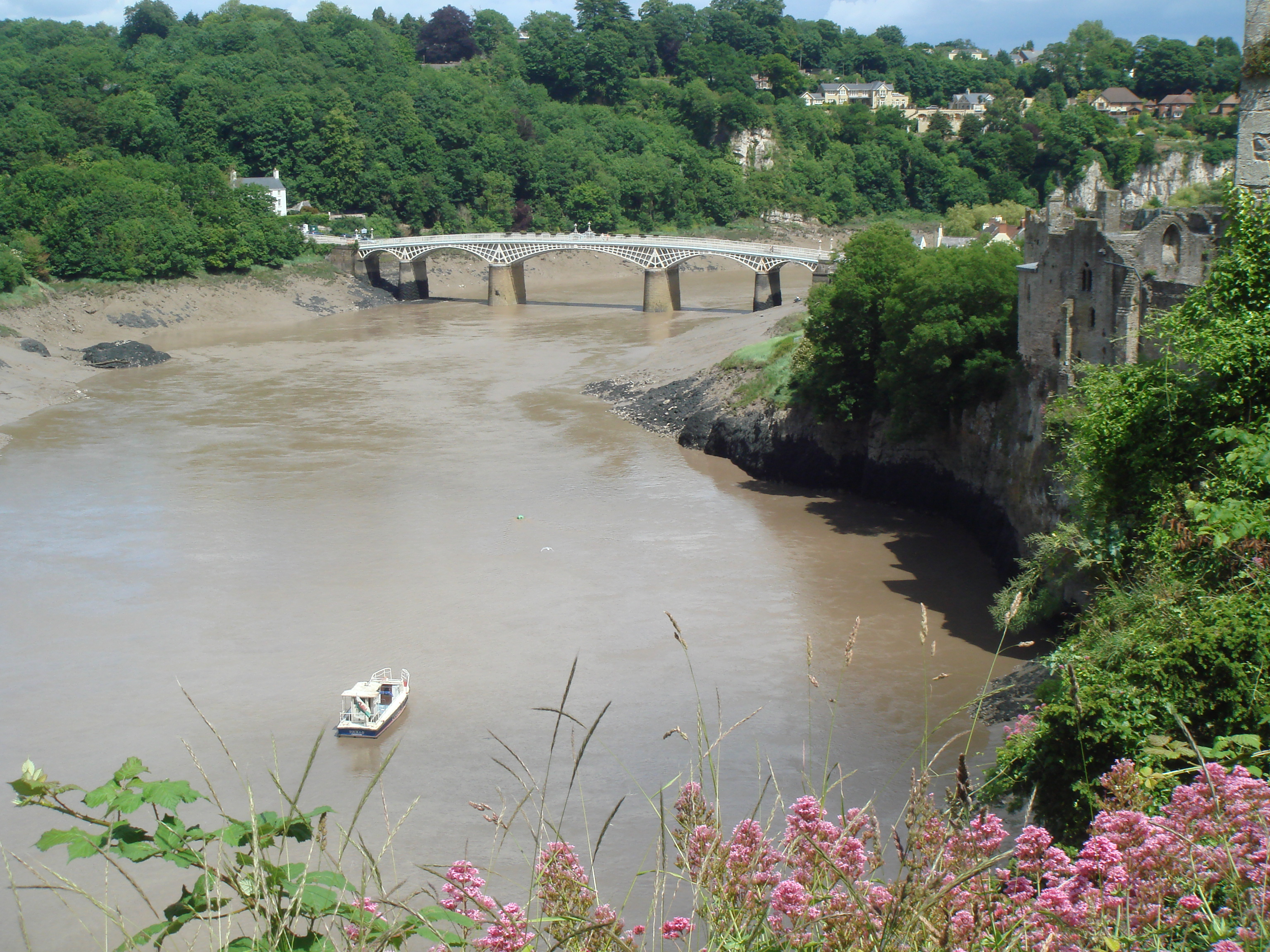
Chepstow Castle and bridge

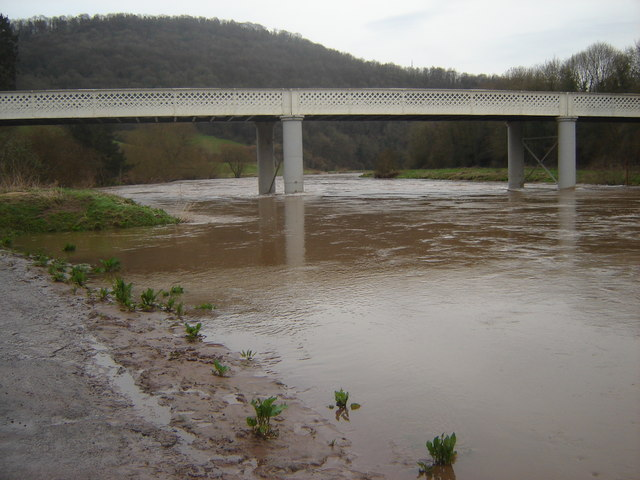
Brockweir Bridge

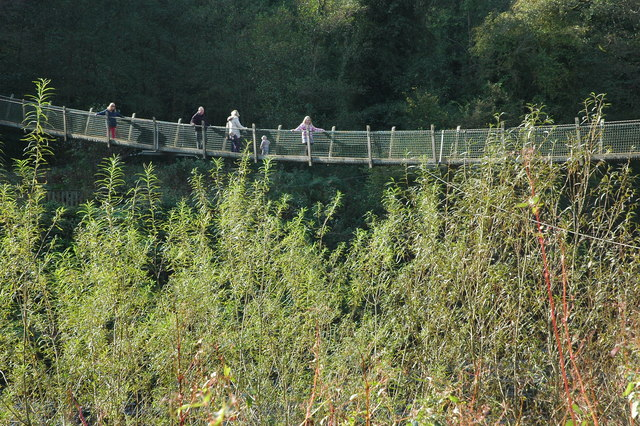
Biblins Bridge

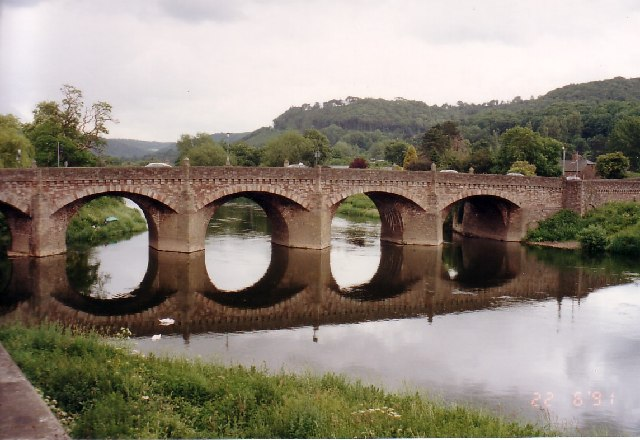
Wye Bridge, Monmouth

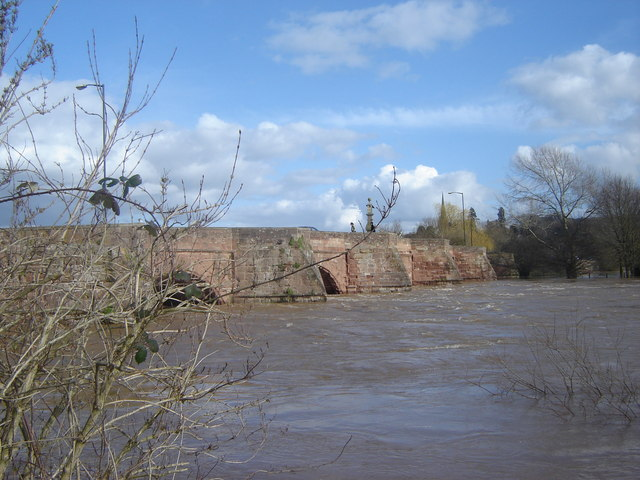
Wilton Bridge, Ross-on-Wye

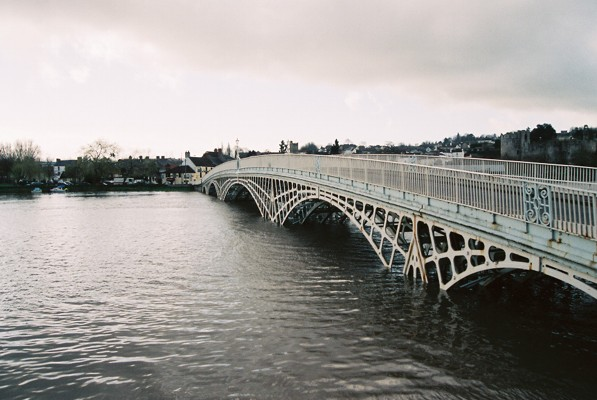
Chepstow Bridge at very high tide

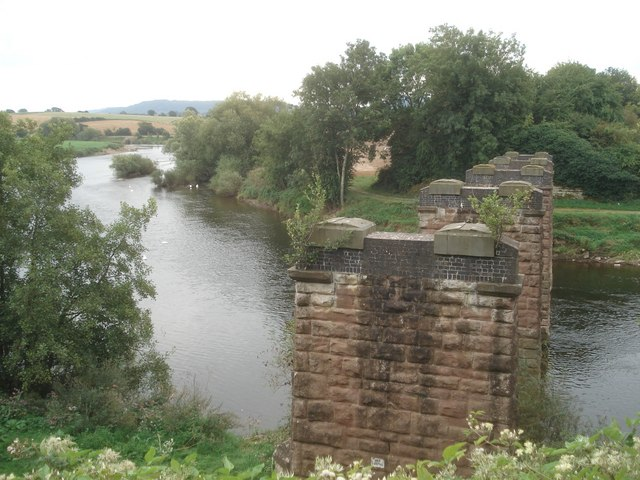
Backney Bridge, near Backney Halt (demolished under the Beeching cuts)

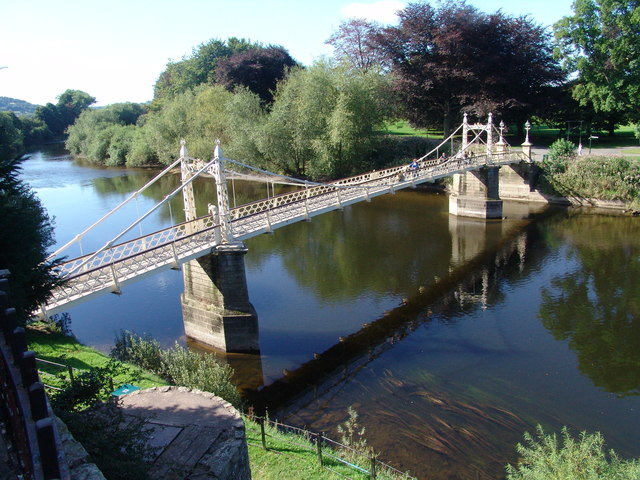
Victoria Bridge, Hereford

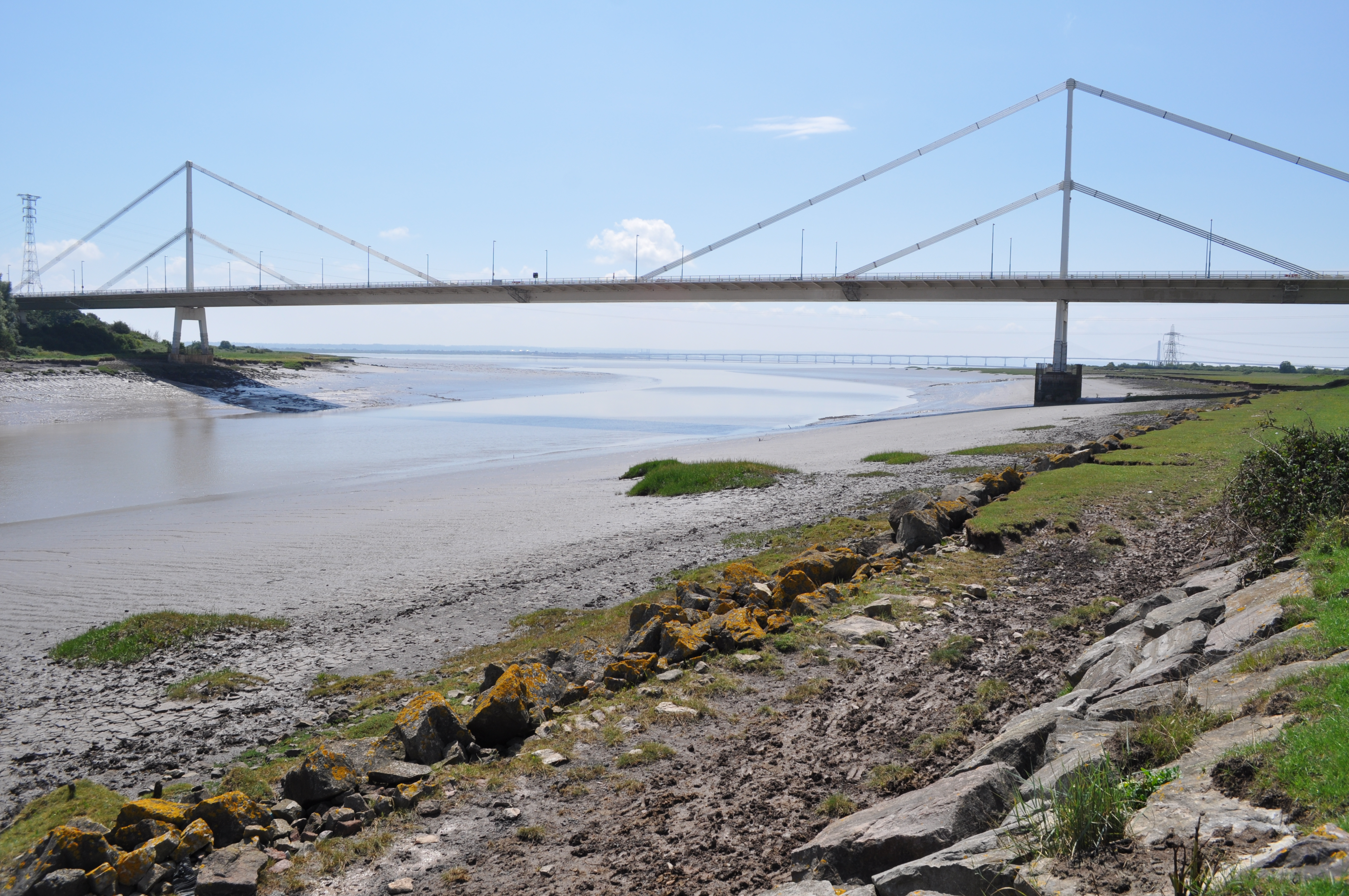
River Wye estuary and M48 Wye road bridge

== See also ==
- List of rivers of England
- List of rivers of Wales
- List of bridges in Wales
- South Herefordshire and Over Severn

== Sources ==
- Barton, Frank (2019). "Wye Invader - The Impossible Journey?". Archived from the original on 18 January 2021.
- Barton, Frank (2019a). "Log of Wye Invader to Monmouth" (PDF). Archived (PDF) from the original on 2 July 2021.
- Cohen, I (1956). The Non-Tidal Wye and its Navigation. Woolhope Naturalists Field Club (Transactions).
- Cumberlidge, Jane (2009). Inland Waterways of Great Britain (8th Ed.). Imray Laurie Norie and Wilson. ISBN 978-1-84623-010-3.
- Hadfield, Charles (1967). The Canals of South Wales and the Border. David and Charles. ISBN 978-0-7153-4027-1.
- Kissack, Keith (1975). Monmouth: The Making of a County Town. Chichester: Phillimore. ISBN 978-0-85033-209-4. OCLC 255539468.
- Paget-Tomlinson, Edward (2006). The Illustrated History of Canal and River Navigations. Landmark Publishing. ISBN 978-1-84306-207-3.
- Waters, Ivor (1977). Chepstow Road Bridges. Moss Rose Press. ISBN 978-0-906134-09-2.
- Wright, Ian (January 1990). "Barging up the Wye". Waterways World. Waterways World. ISSN 0309-1422. Archived from the original on 7 August 2020.
