= Mark Noble (biographer) =

English clergyman, biographer and antiquary

Mark Noble (1754–1827) was an English clergyman, biographer and antiquary.

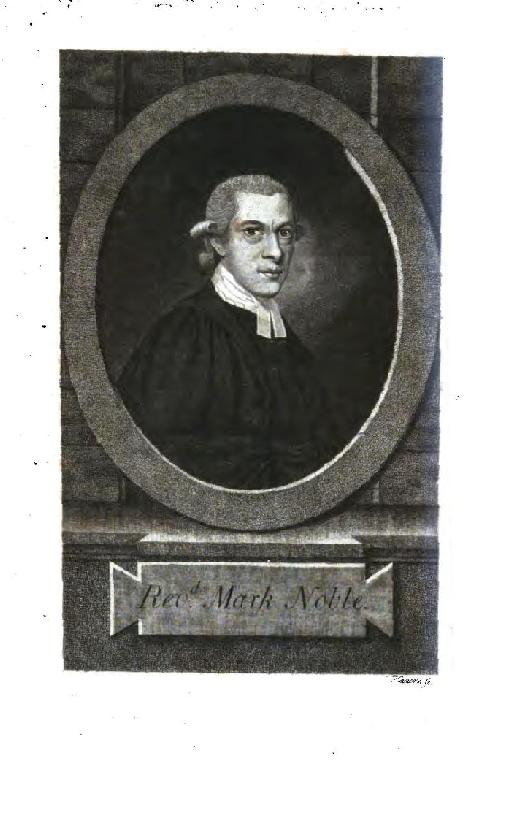
Mark Noble, 1784 engraving by Robert Hancock.

== Life ==
He was born in Digbeth, Birmingham, the third surviving son of William Heatley Noble, a merchant there. His father sold, among many other commodities, beads, knives, toys, and other trifles which he distributed wholesale among slave traders, and he had also a large mill for rolling silver and for plating purposes. Mark was educated at schools at Yardley, Worcestershire, and Ashbourne, Derbyshire. On the death of his father he inherited a modest fortune, and was articled to Mr. Barber, a solicitor of Birmingham. On the expiration of his indentures he went into business on his own account; but turned to literature and history.

In 1781 he was ordained to the curacies of Baddesley Clinton and Packwood, Warwickshire. On the sudden death of the incumbent, Noble was himself presented to the two livings ('starvations,' he called them). Noble, now a married man, took a house at Knowle, Warwickshire, conveniently situated for both his parishes. Here he divided his interests among his congregation, his books, and a farm.

The Earl of Sandwich supported his writings, and Noble was a frequent guest at Hinchingbrooke House, and a regular correspondent of Lord Sandwich. Lord Leicester also became a patron, and appointed Noble his chaplain. On the recommendation of Sandwich and Leicester Lord Chancellor Thurlow presented Noble to the rectory of Barming, Kent in 1786, where he lived for 42 years.

He was elected Fellow of the Society of Antiquaries of London on 1 March 1781; and was also F.S.A. of Edinburgh. In 1816, he was elected a member of the American Antiquarian Society. He died at Barming on 26 May 1827, and was buried in the church, where a monument was erected to his memory.

== Works ==
In 1784 Noble produced a compilation Memoirs of the Protectoral House of Cromwell, 2 vols. London, 1784 (2nd edit., "with improvements", 1787); it contains many errors. Both editions were severely handled by Richard Gough in the preface to his "Short Genealogical View of the Family of Oliver Cromwell" (printed as a portion of the Bibliotheca Topographica Britannica in 1785), and in the Gentleman's Magazine for June 1787 (p. 516), and by William Richards of Lynn in A Review, &c., 1787. A copy containing unpublished corrections belongs to his descendants. While excoriating Noble's "extreme imbecility," Thomas Carlyle made use of the book in his Oliver Cromwell's Letters and Speeches. Out of his materials Noble made two volumes, The Lives of the English Regicides, Birmingham, 1798. From the materials left by Granger and his own collections Noble compiled a Continuation (3 vols. London, 1806) of James Granger's Biographical History of England.

His other works are:

- Two Dissertations on the Mint and Coins of the Episcopal Palatines of Durham, Birmingham, 1780
- A Genealogical History of the present Royal Families of Europe, the Stadtholders of the United States, and the Succession of Popes from the Fifteenth Century to the present time, London, 1781
- An Historical Genealogy of the Royal House of Stuarts from Robert II to James VI, London, 1795
- Memoirs of the illustrious House of Medici, London, 1797
- A History of the College of Arms, London, 1804 (some copies are dated 1805)

He contributed five papers to Archaeologia. His library, which was sold in December 1827, included a large number of manuscript works by him. (Note: Noble's library, which was sold in December 1827, included the following manuscripts by him (for prices and purchasers' names see 'Gentleman's Magazine,' March 1828, pp. 252- 253) (Goodwin 1895, pp. 82, 83)): "Lives of the Fellows of the Society of Antiquaries" (resold at the sales of the libraries of John Gough Nichols in 1873, and Leonard Lawrie Hartley in 1885).; "History of the Records in the Tower of London, with the Lives of the Keepers, especially since the Reign of Henry VIII".; "Catalogue of the Lord Chancellors, Keepers, and Commissioners of the Great Seal".; "History of the Masters of the Rolls".; "Lives of the Recorders and Chamberlains of the City of London".; "Catalogue of all the Religious Houses, Colleges, and Hospitals in England and Wales".; "Account of the Metropolitans of England, commencing with Archbishop Wareham in 1504".; "Catalogue of Knights from the Time of Henry VIII".; "Catalogue of all the Peers, Baronets, and Knights created by Oliver Cromwell".; "Catalogue of Painters and Engravers in England during the Reign of George III".; "Continuation of the Earl of Orford's Catalogue of Engravers".; "Account of the Seals of the Gentry in England since the Norman Conquest".; "Annals of the Civil Wars of York and Lancaster".; "Life of Alice Ferrers, the Favourite of Ed- ward III".; "Life of the Family of Boleyn, particularly of Queen Ann Boleyn, with the Life of her daughter, Queen Elizabeth".; "Life of Queen Mary, exhibiting that part only of her character which represents her as a splendid Princess".; "Relation of the Ambassadors and Agents, with other illustrious Foreigners who were in England during the Reign of King James I".; "The Progresses of James I, exhibiting in a great measure his Majesty's private life".; "Memorabilia of the Family of Killigrew".; "Particulars of the Family of Wykeham, Bishop of Winchester, being a continuation of Lowth's History".; "History of the Dymokes, Champions of England".; "Curious Particulars of the learned Dr. Donne".; "Genealogical Memoirsof the Imperial and Royal House of Buonaparte, including separate Memoirs of the Ministers, &c. of the Emperor".; "Memoirs of the Family of Sheridan".; In the Hartley Library Sale Catalogue, 1885 (Goodwin 1895, pp. 83): "Biographical Anecdotes", in twelve volumes.) (Note: In 1885, at the time of his entry in the Dictionary of National Biography, the following manuscripts are still in the possession of his descendants (Goodwin 1895, pp. 82, 83): "A History of Banning", so full of personal allusions to the parishioners that the executors declined to publish it.; "A Catalogue of engraved portraits, great seals, coins, and medals, &c., illustrative of the History of England, Scotland, and Ireland", six vols. 4to.; "Catalogue of Artists", two vols. 4to.; "Catalogue of Historical Prints, seven vols. 8vo.; "History of the illustrious House of Brunswick, &c". fol.; "Prelatical, Conventual, and other Ecclesiastical Seals", 4to.; "Places of Coinage and Moneyers", &c., 4to.; "A History of the Family of Noble from 1590".; "A Collection of Letters written to Mr. Noble from 1765 to the time of his death, including as many as three hundred letters from Lord Sandwich".)

A youthful portrait of Noble, engraved by Robert Hancock, was prefixed to the first edition of his Memoirs of Cromwell. An oval portrait, engraved by John Keyse Sherwin, was prefixed to the second edition.

== Notes ==
End notes

Citations
