= William Hancock =

William Hancock may refer to:

- William Augustus Hancock (1831–1902), American pioneer, surveyor, engineer, politician, and jurist
- William Hancock (priest), Anglican priest in Australia
- William Hancock (ophthalmologist) (1873–1910), English ophthalmologist and sportsman
- William Hancock Sr. (judge) (died 1762), commissioned Hancock House in Lower Alloways Creek Township, New Jersey
- William Hancock Jr. (judge) (died 1778), mortally wounded at the Hancock's Bridge massacre
- Billy Hancock (1946–2018), American singer, guitarist, and recording artist
- Keith Hancock (historian) (William Keith Hancock, 1898–1988), Australian historian
- William Hancock of Pendle Hall, Lower Higham, Padiham, Lancaster, father-in-law of Thomas Anderton (1611–1671)
- William Hancock (botanist) (1847–1914), commemorated by Cyathea hancockii
- William Hancock (brewer) of Hancocks Brewery in the South West of England, father of Frank, Froude and William Hancock
- William Hancock (rugby), England national rugby union player, Newport RFC, and Salford (RL), first capped 1955
- William J. Hancock, headmaster of Bastrop Academy, who commissioned Fowler House in 1852
- William John Hancock (1864–1931), telephone and X-ray pioneer in Western Australia
- Bill Hancock, a Canadian Alliance candidate in the 2000 Canadian federal election
- Bill Hancock (sports executive) (born 1950), American collegiate sports executive
