= James Walker (engraver) =

British engraver (c. 1760 – c. 1823)

James Walker (c. 1760 – c. 1823) was a British mezzotint engraver.

== Early life ==
The son of a captain in the merchant navy, Walker became a pupil of Valentine Green. Although an eminent mezzotint engraver in England, Walker emigrated to Russia in 1784, remaining there for nearly twenty years.

== Career ==
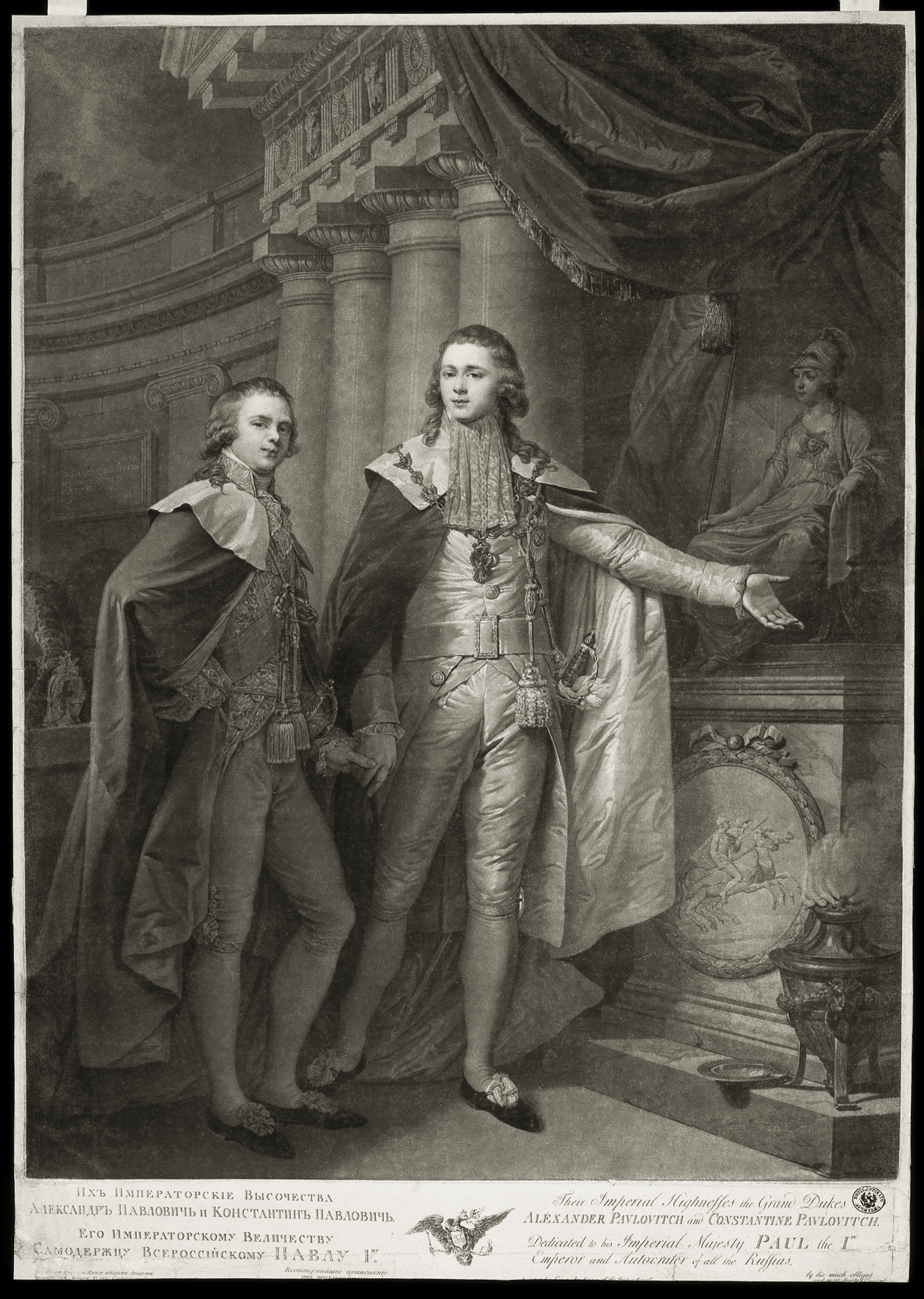
Grand Duke Constantine Pavlovich of Russia and Emperor Alexander I, engraving by James Walker after Johann-Baptist Lampi the Elder

He was invited to St. Petersburg by Empress Catherine II, who appointed him Engraver to Her Imperial Majesty, on a salary of 1,000 roubles a year. His role was to execute mezzotints after the Old Master paintings in the Imperial Collection, which were published in two folders entitled A Collection of Prints, from the Most Celebrated Pictures in the Gallery of her Imperial Majesty Catherine the Second.

Walker also engraved portraits of the Imperial family and the Russian Aristocracy. Walker's appointment as court engraver was renewed by the Emperor Alexander I, and he was a member of the Imperial Academy of Arts at St. Petersburg. He returned to England with a pension in 1802. He visited St. Petersburg again in 1805.

== Works ==
Walker's earliest published plate bears the date 2 July 1780. During the following three years he published: portraits, after George Romney and others; domestic scenes, The Spell, and The Village Doctress, after James Northcote; a scene from Cymbeline, after Edward Penny.

Walker lost 24 of his plates in a shipwreck off Great Yarmouth, when he returned to England in 1802. A list of those was given in the catalogue of a sale of his remaining plates and impressions from the lost plates, at Sotheby's, on 29 November 1822. A portrait of Alexander I was published after his return, on 1 May 1803.

A number of Walker's mezzotints were published for the first time in 1819, and one, The Triumph of Cupid, after Parmigianino, in 1822.

== Notes ==
Attribution

This article incorporates text from a publication now in the public domain: Lee, Sidney, ed. (1899). "Walker, James (1748-1808?)". Dictionary of National Biography. Vol. 59. London: Smith, Elder & Co.

== Bibliography ==
- Alan Bird, 'James Walker: A British Engraver in St Petersburg' in British Art Treasures from Russian Imperial Collections in the Hermitage, edited by B. Allen and L. Dukelskaya, New Haven, CT, 1996
- A. G. Cross, Engraved in the Memory: James Walker, Engraver to the Empress Catherine the Great, and his Russian Anecdotes, Oxford and Providence, 1993
- Ekaterina Skvortcova, 'New Facts about James Walker in Russia', Print Quarterly, Vol. XXXII, No. 3 (September 2015), pp. 270–293
