= Valentine Green =

English engraver and publisher (1739–1813)

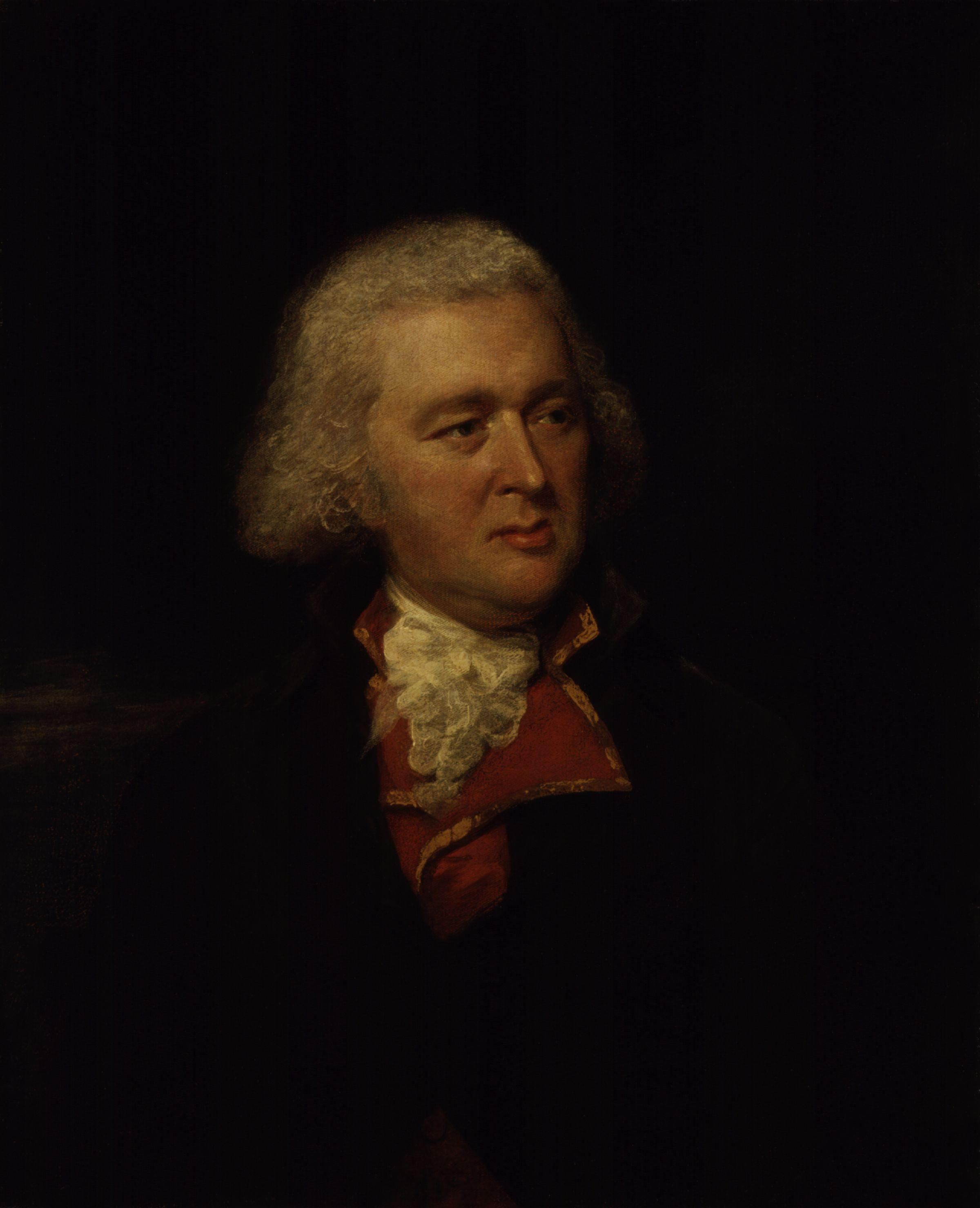
1788 portrait of Green by Lemuel Francis Abbott

Valentine Green FSA (3 October 1739 – 29 July 1813) was an English engraver and print publisher. Green trained under Robert Hancock, a Worcester engraver, after which he moved to London and began working as a mezzotint engraver. He began to exhibit with the Incorporated Society of Artists from 1766, became a fellow a year later and a director in 1771. He was appointed mezzotint engraver to the King in 1773, and the following year was elected an associate engraver with the Royal Academy. Throughout the 1770s and 1780s, Green's engraving practice flourished. In the 1790s, however, several of his international speculations failed and in 1798 he was declared bankrupt. In 1805, he accepted the role of keeper of the British Institution, a post he held until his death.

== Biography ==
Born in Salford Priors, he was placed by his father in a solicitor's office at Evesham, where he remained for two years; but ultimately he decided, on his own responsibility, to abandon the legal profession and became a pupil of a line engraver at Worcester. In 1765, he migrated to London and began work as a mezzotint engraver, having taught himself the technicalities of this art, and quickly rose to a position in absolutely the front rank of British engravers. On first coming to London he published in collaboration with the Aquatint engraver Francis Jukes.

== Career ==
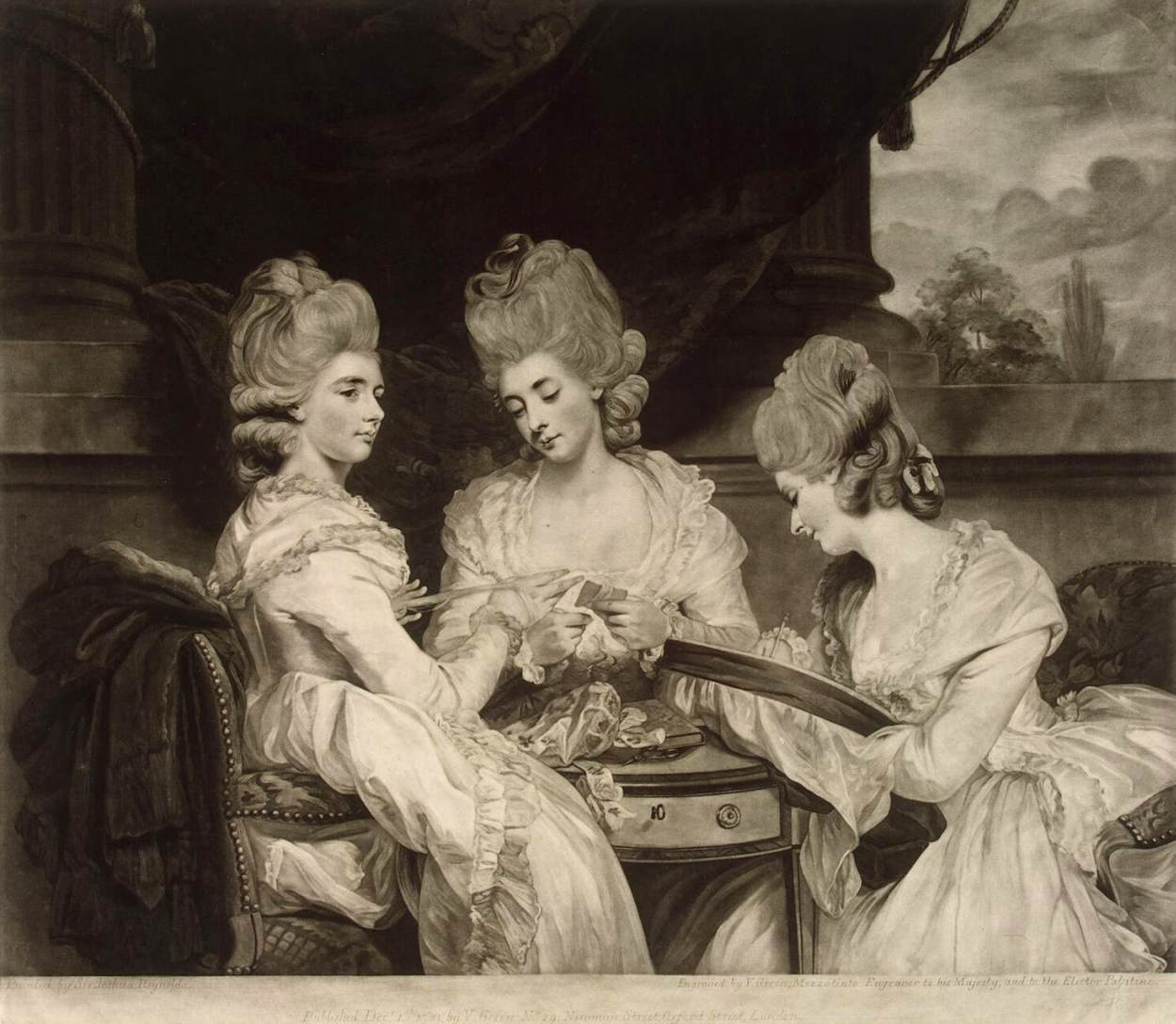
Portrait of the Ladies Waldegrave, mezzotint after Joshua Reynolds

He became a member of the Incorporated Society of Artists in 1767, an associate-engraver of the Royal Academy in 1775, and for some forty years he followed his profession with the greatest success. The exclusive right of engraving and publishing plates from the pictures in the Düsseldorf gallery was granted him by the duke of Bavaria in 1789, but, after he had issued more than twenty of these plates, the siege of that city by the French put an end to this undertaking and caused him serious financial loss.

From this cause, and through the failure of certain other speculations, he was reduced to poverty; and in consequence he took the post of keeper of the British Institution in 1805, and continued in this office for the remainder of his life. During his career as an engraver he produced some four hundred plates after portraits by Reynolds, Romney, and other British artists, after the compositions of Benjamin West, and after pictures by Van Dyck, Rubens, Murillo, and other old masters.

It is claimed for him that he was one of the first engravers to show how admirably mezzotint could be applied to the translation of pictorial compositions as well as portraits, but at the present time it is to his portraits that most attention is given by collectors. His engravings are distinguished by richness and subtlety of tone, light and shade.

== The Antiquarian ==
A keen Antiquarian, he was a Fellow of the Society of Antiquaries, in London. He published at least three works. The first was a "Survey of the City of Worcester", published in 1764, compiled during his residence there. Printed by J. Butler for S.Gamidge, at Prior's Head, Worcester. This formed the groundwork for his second book "the History and antiquities of the City and Suburbs of Worcester", published as two volumes on 3 April 1796. Printed for the author by W.Bulmer and Co. and sold by G.Nicol of London. His third work was "An Account of the Discovery of the Body of King John: In the Cathedral Church of Worcester", published by V. and R. Green, Percy Street, Bedford Square, London on 17 July 1797.

== Legacy ==
James Walker (c.1748–c.1808) was one of Green's pupils.
