= Biblins Bridge =

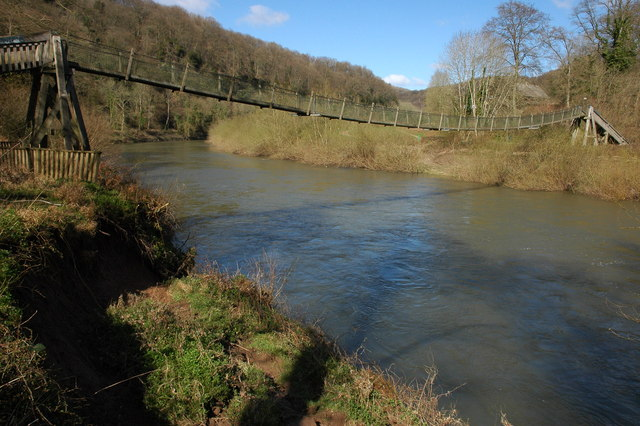
- Coordinates: 51.82644°N 2.6552°W
- Carries: Pedestrians
- Crosses: River Wye
- Locale: Wye Valley
- Begins: Monmouthshire
- Ends: Herefordshire
- Owner: Forestry Commission

Characteristics
- Material: Wood/steel
- Total length: 57.9m

History
- Built: 1957
- Construction cost: £2,500

Location
- Interactive map of Biblins Bridge

Biblins Bridge is a footbridge which crosses the River Wye between England and Wales, near Symonds Yat. The present structure dates from 1957, although there has been a crossing at this point since the early 20th century.

== History and description ==
At the Biblins Bridge crossing point, the Welsh/English border runs down the middle of the River Wye. The bridge thus has one endpoint in Monmouthshire, Wales, and one in Herefordshire, England. A bridge where Biblins Bridge now stands existed in the early 20th century and was used for the transportation of logs across the river. In 1924, this crossing point was replaced with a footbridge. In 1957 the Forestry Commission rebuilt the footbridge and this replacement is largely what stands today, although it has twice been the subject of major restoration, firstly in the 1990s, and again in 2020, after damage caused by Storm Desmond. (Note: The wooden signpost erected in the 1950s, with distance markers to Monmouth and to Symond's Yat, was swept away in the flooding caused by Storm Desmond. It was recovered 40 miles (64 km) downstream at Portishead in Somerset, on the opposite side of the Bristol Channel. It was later re-erected at the Biblins site.) Land slippage due to flooding again impacted the bridge in 2021.

The bridge is constructed primarily of timber, with a steel walkway. The walkway is strung between two wooden towers, and has a distinct sway. The bridge is popular with walkers exploring the Wye Valley and the Forest of Dean. There is a limit of six pedestrians using the bridge at any one time. The bridge is the only crossing point for a 7-mile (11 km) stretch of the Wye, between Huntsham in Herefordshire 3 miles (4.8 km) to the north, and the Wye Bridge at Monmouth 4 miles (6.4 km) to the south.

The English end of the bridge is the location for the Biblins Youth Camp, a camping facility operated by The Woodcraft Folk. (Note: In 2025 the charity announced fundraising plans to restore a bunkhouse at the site. Built in the 1960s, the cabin has been derelict since 2013.) The nearby Biblins Lodge, a forester's cottage dating from the early 19th century, is recorded on the RCAHMW Coflein database.

== Gallery ==
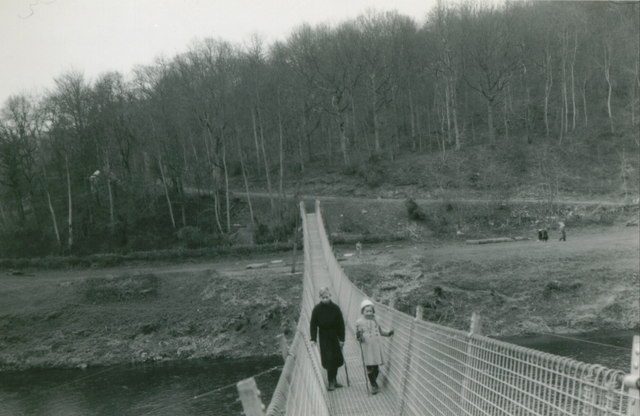
The bridge in 1958, a year after construction

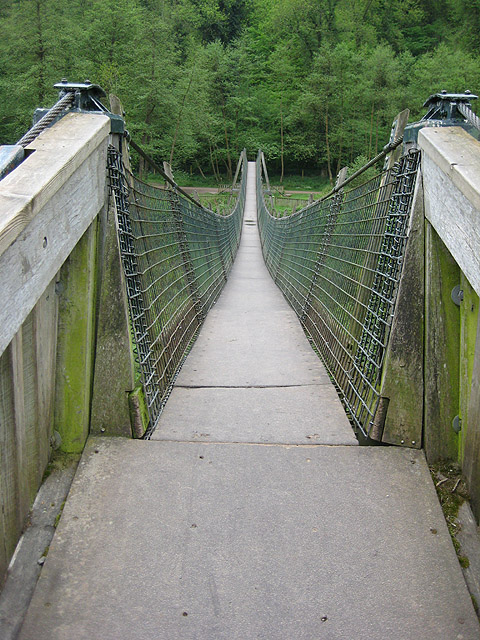
Approach to the bridge

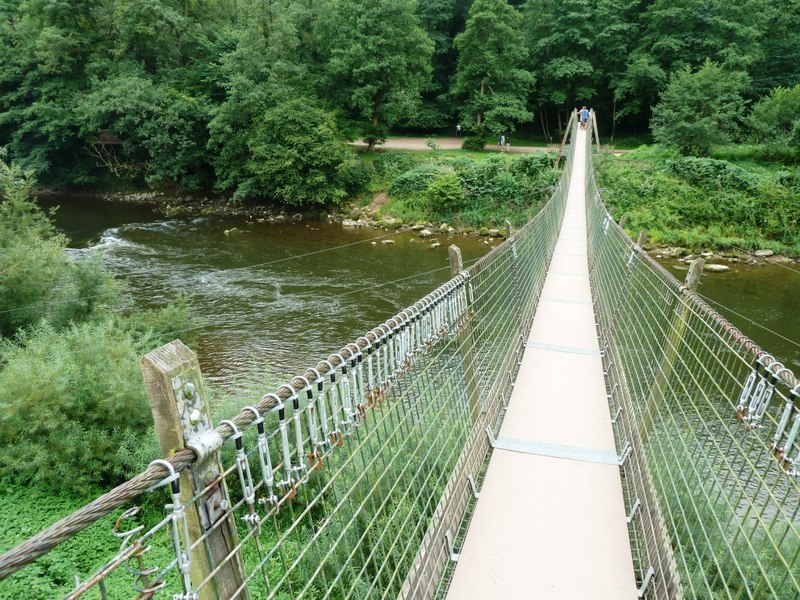
View along the bridge

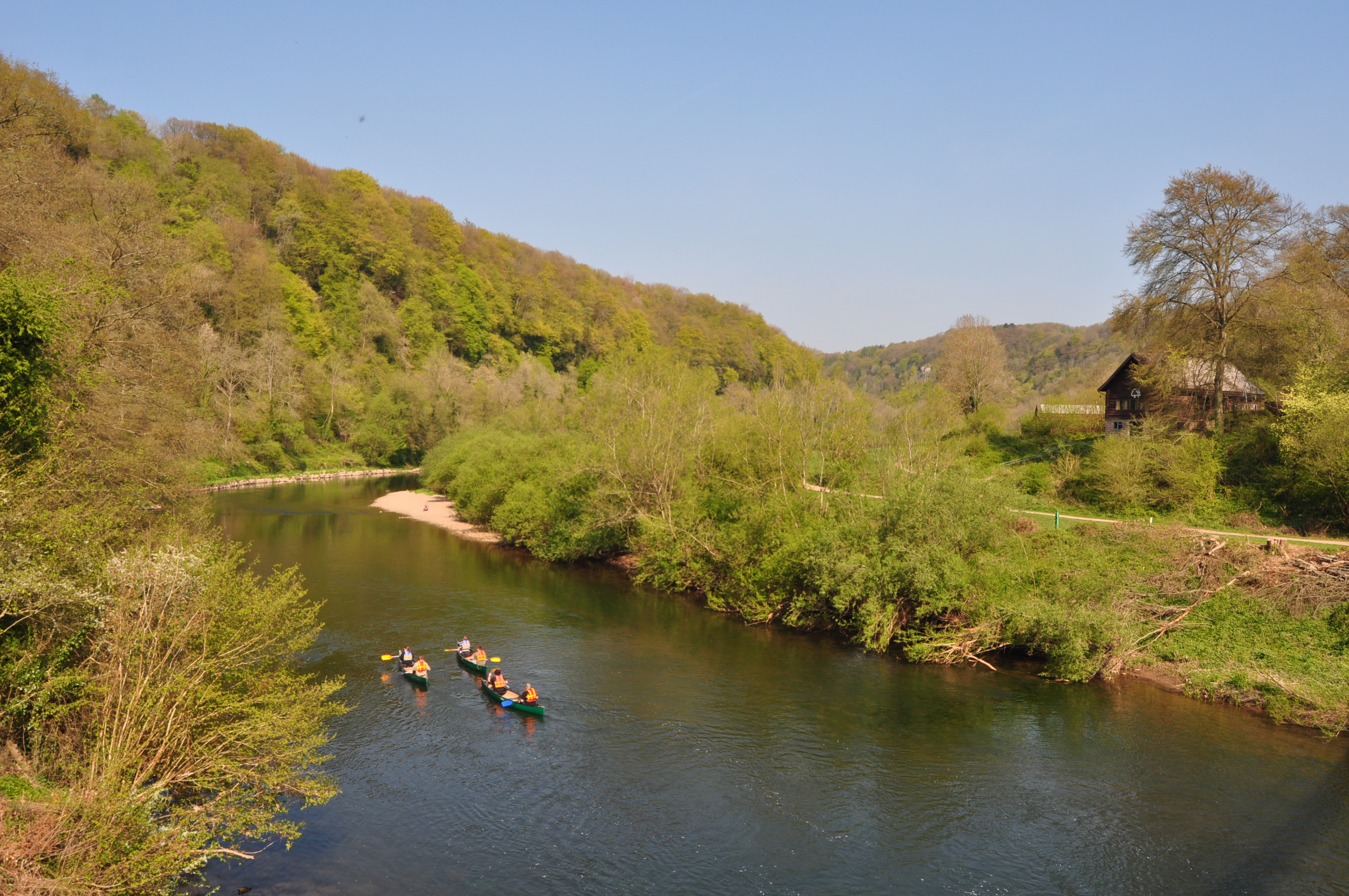
River Wye from the bridge

== See also ==
- List of crossings of the River Wye

== Sources ==
- Dunn, Mike (2013). Walking in the Forest of Dean: 25 Routes in the Historic Royal Forest. Kendal, Cumbria: Cicerone Press. ISBN 978-1-849-65899-7.
