= Afon Marteg =

River in Wales

Coordinates: 52.33035°N 3.53416°W

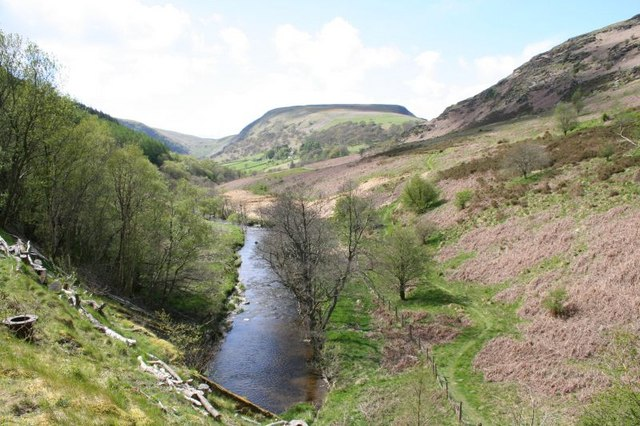
Afon Marteg

The Afon Marteg is a river in Powys, Wales.

It is about 15 km (9 mi) long, flowing roughly south-west to join the Wye at Pont Marteg (grid reference SN952714) about 5 km (3 mi) above Rhayader.

Fishing is available, with appropriate permits, for brown trout, chub, dace, grayling and pike. The river has a run of spawning Atlantic salmon in the autumn.
