= George Hancock =

George Hancock may refer to:

- George Hancock (Virginia politician) (1754–1820), U.S. Congressman from Virginia
- George Hancock (Royal Navy officer) (1819–1876), Commander-in-Chief, Pacific Station
- George Hancock (softball) (fl. 1880s), Chicago inventor of softball
- George Hancock (architect) (1849–1924), active in North Dakota, Montana, Minnesota
- George Allan Hancock (1875–1965), owner of the Rancho La Brea Oil Company
- George Hancock (footballer) (1931–2010), Australian rules footballer
- George Hancock (rugby union)
