= Michael Hancock =

Michael or Mike Hancock may refer to:

- Mike Hancock (Canadian politician), mayor of Brantford, Ontario, Canada
- Mike Hancock (American football) (born 1950), American football player
- Michael Hancock (rugby league) (born 1969), Australian rugby league footballer
- Mike Hancock (British politician) (born 1946), British independent former Member of Parliament, formerly Liberal Democrat and SDP
- Michael Hancock (Colorado politician) (born 1969), mayor of Denver, Colorado, US
