= Thomas Hancock =

Thomas Hancock may refer to:

- Thomas Hancock (merchant) (1703–1764), Boston businessman, uncle of John Hancock
- Thomas Hancock (physician) (1783–1849), Irish physician
- Thomas Hancock (priest) (1832–1903), English priest
- Thomas Hancock (inventor) (1786–1865), English inventor who founded the British rubber industry
- Thomas Hancock (VC) (1823–1871), English recipient of the Victoria Cross
