= George Hancock (footballer) =

Australian rules footballer

Personal information
- Full name: George Hancock
- Born: 16 January 1931
- Died: 6 February 2010 (aged 79)
- Original team: Bairnsdale
- Height: 187 cm (6 ft 2 in)
- Weight: 104 kg (229 lb)

Playing career^{1}
Years	Club	Games (Goals)
1956	Hawthorn	5 (5)
- ^{1} Playing statistics correct to the end of 1956.

George Hancock (16 January 1931 – 6 February 2010) was an Australian rules footballer who played with Hawthorn in the Victorian Football League (VFL).
