= Hancox =

Hancox is a surname. Notable people with the surname include:

- Allan Hancox (1932–2013), Kenyan lawyer and judge
- David Hancox, English footballer
- Edith Hancox (1874–1954), British-born Canadian socialist feminist and journalist
- Lewis Hancox (born 1989), English graphic novelist, social media personality and filmmaker
- Mitch Hancox (born 1993), English footballer
- Richard Hancox (born 1968), English footballer
- Stuart A. Hancox, English translator

== See also ==
- Hancock
- Mount Hancox, mountain in Victoria Land, Antarctica
