= Emily Hancock =

Emily Hancock may refer to:

- Emily Hancock Siedeberg (1873–1968), New Zealand doctor and medical administrator
- Emily Hancock (Neighbours), a fictional character from Australian soap opera Neighbours
