= Anthony Hancock =

Anthony Hancock may refer to:

- Anthony Hancock (American football) (born 1960), former NFL wide receiver
- Anthony Hancock (publisher) (1947–2012), British far-right publisher
- Tony Hancock (1924–1968), British comedian
- Tony Hancock (footballer)

== See also ==
- Tony Hancox (1927–2017), English rower
