= Keith Hancock (musician) =

Keith Hancock (born 1980) is an American two-time Grammy-nominated music instructor, winning the Grammy Music Educator of the Year award in 2017, and being nominated and selected as a top-10 finalist in 2016. He was the first vocal music educator to win the award as well as the first recipient on the West Coast.

Hancock is the music director at Compass Bible Church in Aliso Viejo, California where he periodically sings in the worship band during weekend church services. He teaches music in the California public school system at Tesoro High School where he has grown the program from 35 to 225 students. His personal music career includes performing on stage at venues including Carnegie Hall, the Hollywood Bowl, and the Segerstrom Center for the Arts (formerly the Orange County Performing Arts Center).
