= Bob Hancock =

Australian rules footballer (born 1942)

Personal information
- Born: 26 August 1942
- Original team: Bairnsdale

Playing career^{1}
| Years | Club | Games (Goals) |
| 1961–63 | North Melbourne | 6 (2) |
- ^{1} Playing statistics correct to the end of 1963.

Robert Hancock (born 26 August 1942) is a former Australian rules footballer who played with North Melbourne in the Victorian Football League (VFL) during the 1960s.
