= William John Hancock =

William John Hancock D.Sc. (Hon), MIEE, MICE, LRCP (2 May 1864 – 26 August 1931) was an Australian of Irish descent, an electrical engineer, telephone pioneer and pioneer in X-rays in the colony of Western Australia. He was honorary radiologist for Perth Hospital and Base Hospital in Fremantle. His list of credentials and accomplishments include M.I.E.E., Member of the Institution of Electrical Engineers, M.I.C.E., Member of the Institution of Civil Engineers, L.R.C.P., Licentiate of the Royal College of Physicians and D.Sc. (Honorary).

In the colonies of Australia, the medical men of the day took a slow approach in the adoption of the new science that involved x-rays. Many of the early demonstrations were made by investigators outside the medical field. Upon examination of the initial investigators, several key factors were common. The individuals had already either been experimenting along similar lines to Wilhelm Röntgen with Crookes tubes and such, the physicists or scientists, or were actively associated with electrical work, the electricians, which made them particularly receptive to the technical appeal of the new science of x-rays. Records of the events reveal that among the medical men who witnessed the first images produced as radiographs, a rather small number had any great desire to employ X-rays directly in their own medical practice.

After the early investigative work of Thomas Ranken Lyle, William Henry Bragg, Joseph Patrick Slattery, and others, almost all medical men were satisfied with soliciting the services of the external X-ray man when necessity arose for skiagraphs to be produced. As the utilization of x-rays became more acceptable, the involvement of electricians began to decline. As the hospitals started to be equipped with x-ray apparatus and installations under the care of radiologists and radiographers, the medical men began to accept the eventuality of the new technology. Up to this point, the private experimenters and investigators continued to be the initiators of new ideas for the medical profession in this new field.

== Life and times ==
In 1864, Hancock was born at Dublin, Ireland the son of William John Hancock, an actuary, and Annette Dickson née Bowdler. He attended the University of Glasgow and studied engineering for two years, under the tutelage of James Thomson and William Thomson, who later became Lord Kelvin. On 1 December 1910, Hancock married Ida Helen Lovegrove, daughter of Dr. Thomas Henry and Maude Lovegrove, at St George's Anglican Cathedral in Perth, Western Australia. They did not have children. In 1931, Hancock died in London.

== Career ==
After his studies at Glasgow, Hancock went to work for the Dublin Telephone Exchange. At Dublin he gained experience in the workings of telephone systems with the Dublin Exchange that at the time had 900 subscribers who completed roughly 7,000 telephone calls every day.

In August 1885, the Postal and Telegraph Department of the Legislative Council at Perth in the Western Australia colony had a vacancy to fill due to the recent death of the Superintendent of Telegraphs. The postmaster general had been charged with finding a permanent replacement who had knowledge of the workings of the telephone and telegraph. The local government was interested in the extension of the telegraph lines northward.

In February 1886, Hancock arrived at Perth to become superintendent of telephones for the government. His duties were to establish telephone exchanges in Perth and Fremantle. Hancock supervised the construction of telephone equipment between Government House and the office of the Colony Secretary. He installed exchanges in Perth and Fremantle. The Bell and Blake magneto telephone was utilized. The early installation had 17 subscribers.

Hancock constructed the telegraph lines that connected Perth to Roebourne, to Broome and Derby, and then to Hall's Creek and Wyndham. In January 1893, a telegraph office was opened at Wyndham. Lines were installed that connected to Kalgoorlie and Marble Bar. The telephone lines encountered difficulties with the native Aboriginal people, from insects that included ants and termites, excessive heat, and bushfires. Iron wire had to be utilized, as the copper wires melted.

He supervised all electrical works in Western Australia, including the tramways and installation of submarine cables in the harbors at Fremantle and Bunbury. In 1894, Hancock was appointed government electrical engineer, a position he held until retirement due to poor health in 1922. On 27 May 1907, a fatal tramway accident occurred at Fremantle. Hancock, a Government electrical engineer, testified that he examined the tram’s braking system and stated the brakes were in working order.

== X-ray pioneer ==
In January 1896, the first mention of Wilhelm Röntgen’s discovery reached Western Australia via news from London in the local press. In August 1896, Hancock demonstrated at Perth the X-ray apparatus he had obtained from London. In 1898, he received an appointment at the Perth Public Hospital as an honorary radiographer. Hancock held the appointment for over 20 years. He worked as an engineer during the day, and contributed his time, X-ray services and equipment, to the public during afternoons and evenings. Some estimate that he performed between 20,000 and 30,000 exposures with this service.

== Professional service ==
- Perth Public Hospital, secretary, 1897–1913
- British Medical Association, Western Australian branch, secretary, 1918–1931
- Medical Board of Australia, registrar, 1927–31
- British Medical Association, member
- Weld Club, member
- M.I.E.E., Member of the Institution of Electrical Engineers
- M.I.C.E., Member of the Institution of Civil Engineers
- M.R.C.S., Membership of the Royal College of Surgeons
- L.R.C.P., Licentiate of the Royal College of Physicians

== Awards and honors ==
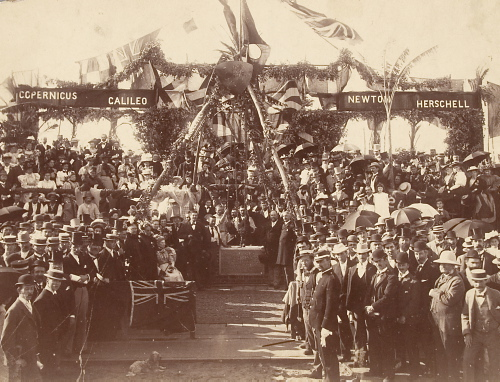
Laying the foundation stone of Perth Observatory, albumen print, photographed by Clarke and Sons, Perth, Western Australia, 29 September 1896 (Front)

Of interest to note, when the Perth Observatory foundation was laid on 29 September 1896, the occasion was attended by Sir John Forrest and other notable dignitaries, and several items of importance were placed in a leaden box (time capsule), sealed and deposited in a cavity beneath the foundation stone. The event was described in the local press and mentioned here since "Röntgen rays tubes, and a description of the process, together with specimen photographs", donated by Hancock were included in the cache. This is the first known instance of a time capsule in Western Australia, and in Australia.

In Canberra, on 3 March 1936, at the Australian Institute of Anatomy a face mask was erected in the applied anatomy museum. The bust was unveiled to commemorate Dr. William John Hancock and his service to Australia as a pioneer of X-rays and radiology in Western Australia.

- Royal Society of Western Australia, Kelvin Gold Medal, inaugural awardee, 1924
- University of Western Australia, honorary doctorate of science, 1924
- University of Western Australia, Senate, 1915–1927

=== Memorial Window at University of Western Australia ===
In 1934, a stained glass memorial window was placed in the foyer of Winthrop Hall, at the University of Western Australia at Crawley, Western Australia. The window was erected to commemorate William John Hancock, a pioneer radiologist, X-ray specialist and former member of the University Senate. The inscription on the window reads: "In honour of William John Hancock, Doctor of Science, pioneer in radiology in Western Australia, 1864-1931." The window was commissioned by the University Senate after a design competition selected Brooks, Robinson Pty., Ltd., of Melbourne to receive the winning prize of £20. Dr. Leslie Wilkinson, Professor of Architecture of the University of Sydney approved the winning design. The design incorporated "the symbols of science, the lamp of learning, the serpent of healing, a crown of honour, and a scroll with the words, "Greater Love Hath No. Man.!" The emblems have received heraldic treatment. A feature of the design is the late Dr. Hancock's crest at the bottom—a cock and an Irish shamrock—and the motto, "Vincit Amor Patriae" (Love of Country Prevails)." The William John Hancock Memorial Window is located in Crawley at latitude: -31.975894, and longitude: 115.818042.
