= Robert Hancock (footballer) =

Australian rules footballer

Personal information
- Full name: Robert Arthur Hancock
- Born: 22 June 1922; Hobart, Tasmania
- Died: 9 February 1973 (aged 50); Heidelberg, Victoria
- Original team: St Kilda Colts
- Height: 168 cm (5 ft 6 in)
- Weight: 67 kg (148 lb)

Playing career^{1}
Years	Club	Games (Goals)
1946–1950	St Kilda	58 (49)
- ^{1} Playing statistics correct to the end of 1950.

Robert Arthur 'Bobby' Hancock (22 June 1922 – 9 February 1973) was an Australian rules footballer who played with St Kilda in the VFL during the late 1940s. A small rover, Hancock served in the Navy before arriving at St Kilda in 1946. He won St Kilda's best and fairest award in 1948 and represented Victoria in 3 interstate matches that year. Hancock also finished equal 6th in the 1948 Brownlow Medal count.
