= Robert Hancock (engraver) =

English engraver (1730–1817)

Robert Hancock (1730–1817) was an English engraver.

== Life ==
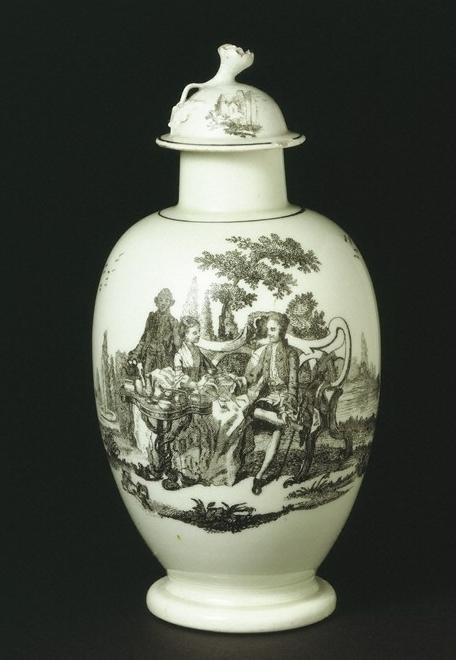
Worcester porcelain tea canister c.1768, engraver Robert Hancock

Hancock was born in Staffordshire, studied under Simon François Ravenet, and was at first engaged as an engraver at the Battersea Enamel Works under Stephen Theodore Janssen. In 1756 or 1757 he became draughtsman and engraver to the Worcester Porcelain Works, and engraved plates for the transfer-printed china for which the works became known. He was one of the proprietors of the works from 3 March 1772 till 31 October 1774, when he sold his share, after disputes with the other partners. He retained, however, till January 1804 his property in a house built by Richard Holdship on the works, which he had purchased from the mortgagees in 1769.

On leaving the Worcester works in 1774, Hancock is next supposed to have gone to the Staffordshire Potteries. It is said that on losing his savings in a bank failure he concentrated on engraving in mezzotint. In the latter part of his life he was living in Bristol. He died in October 1817, in his eighty-seventh year. Valentine Green and James Ross the line-engraver were his pupils.

== Works ==
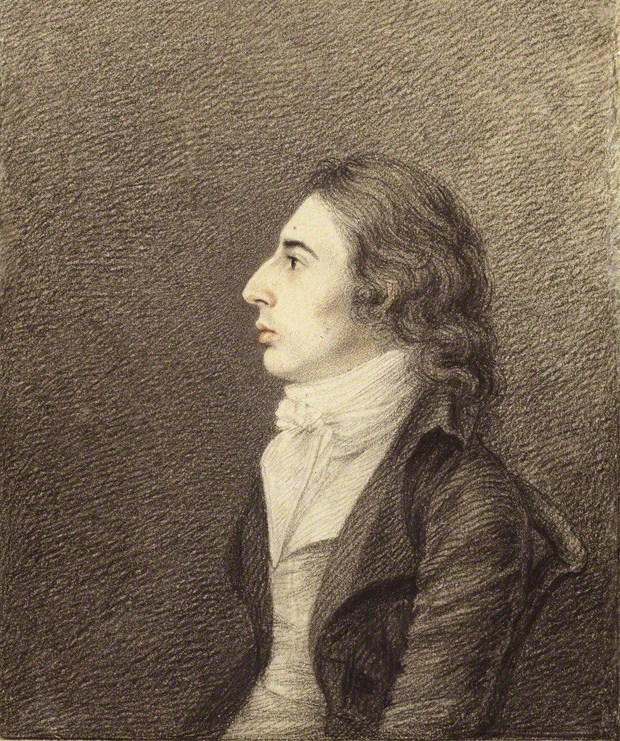
Robert Southey, 1798 drawing by Robert Hancock

Hancock on the transfer-printed Worcester porcelain uses the signature "R.H", "R.H.fecit", "R.Hancock fecit Worcester", "R. Hancock" (or just Hancock) "fecit", and other variations. The mark of Richard Holdship of the Worcester works was an anchor rebus, and the two marks sometimes occur together on the same piece of porcelain. Hancock's work often involved garden-scenes, milkmaid-scenes, and figures and half-lengths (especially of Frederick the Great).

After switching to the medium of paper, Hancock engraved, after Sir Joshua Reynolds, portraits of General William Kingsley, Lady Chambers, Miss Day (Lady Fenhoulet), Mark Noble (1784); after Joseph Wright of Derby, portraits of William Hopley, verger of Worcester Cathedral, of Wright, and of himself; and a portrait of John Wesley (1790), after J. Miller. About 1796, in Bristol, he drew small crayon portraits engraved by Richard Woodman for Joseph Cottle's Reminiscences: of Charles Lamb, William Wordsworth, Robert Southey, and Samuel Taylor Coleridge. These were purchased for the National Portrait Gallery in 1877.

Hancock also engraved plates in Valentine Green's History of Worcester, and the plates in a folio bible published by Pearson & Rollason of Birmingham.

== Notes ==
Attribution

This article incorporates text from a publication now in the public domain: Stephen, Leslie; Lee, Sidney, eds. (1890). "Hancock, Robert". Dictionary of National Biography. Vol. 24. London: Smith, Elder & Co.
