= Robert E. W. Hancock =

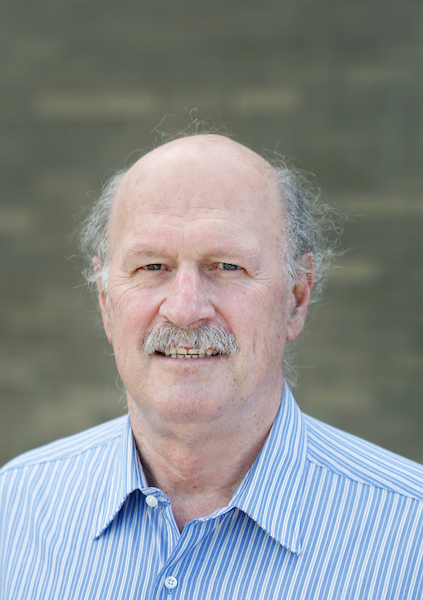
- Hancock in 2016
- Born: March 23, 1949 (age 77)
- Occupation: Professor
- Awards: Officer of the Order of Canada, ICAAC Antimicrobial Research Award, Prix Galien, Order of British Columbia

Academic background
- Education: University of Adelaide

Academic work
- Discipline: Microbiology and Immunology
- Institutions: University of British Columbia
- Notable ideas: Self-promoted uptake theory, Cationic peptides as immune modulators
- Website: Hancock Lab Website

Robert Ernest William Hancock OC OBC FRSC (born March 23, 1949) is a Canadian microbiologist and University of British Columbia Killam Professor of Microbiology and Immunology, an Associate Faculty Member of the Wellcome Trust Sanger Institute, and a Canada Research Chair in Health and Genomics.

Over his career he has published more than 800 papers and reviews, has 72 patents awarded, and is an ISI highly cited author in Microbiology with more than 113,000 citations and an h-index of 168. He has won several awards and is an Officer of the Order of Canada. He is a co-founder of Migenix, Inimex Pharmaceuticals, ABT Innovations, Sepset Biotherapeutics, and the Centre for Drug Research and Development. He serves as a member of the Scientific Advisory Board for Qu Biologics.

== Education ==
Hancock received his BSc (First Class Honors) (1971) and PhD (1975) in Microbiology from the University of Adelaide, where he studied bacteriophage receptors. He did his post-doctoral work at the University of Tübingen in Germany (1975-1977), where he studied the E. coli outer membrane, followed by a research year at the University of California, Berkeley. At Berkeley, he began his work on Pseudomonas aeruginosa and porins proteins that form channels in membranes. While at UBC he came up with the self-promoted uptake theory, the idea that antibiotics promote their own uptake across the cell membrane.

== Research ==
Hancock began studying antibiotic resistance mechanisms in Pseudomonas aeruginosa, which eventually led to his involvement in sequencing the genome of Pseudomonas, only the 4th bacterial genome to be sequenced. Hancock's research identified new mechanisms of antibiotic resistance especially dependent on lifestyle adaptations in Pseudomonas, and found new therapeutics for treating antibiotic resistant pathogens. This then led to investigating small cationic peptides from nature, originally termed cationic antimicrobial peptides, but eventually "host defence peptides". Hancock became one of the first and most prominent advocates that the major function of these peptides was as modulators of the immune system. To understand the role of these peptides as modulators of the immune system he developed InnateDB, NetworkAnalyst and MetaBridge as tools to enable systems/network biology studies and insights.

Currently Hancock and his lab’s research interests include small cationic peptides as novel antimicrobials, broad-spectrum anti-biofilm agents, and modulators of innate immunity, the development of novel treatments for antibiotic resistant infections and inflammation, the systems biology of innate immunity, inflammatory diseases and Pseudomonas aeruginosa, and antibiotic uptake and resistance.

== Other work ==
=== Canadian Anti-infective Innovation Network (CAIN) ===
Hancock and Gerry Wright formed the Canadian Anti-infective Innovation Network (CAIN) in 2017. CAIN was formed with the purpose of leveraging innovative approaches and expertise to solve the expanding health crisis caused by Antimicrobial Resistance (AMR) infections. In less than a year CAIN grew to over 90 members from across Canada.

=== Centre for Microbial Diseases and Immunity Research (CMDR) ===
Hancock is the director of the Centre for Microbial Diseases and Immunity Research (CMDR) a multi-faculty, multi-department consortium of world class microbial diseases and immunology researchers located at the University of British Columbia.

== Awards and honours ==
- Prix Galien (Highest award for Canadian pharmaceutical research and innovation) 2012
- Diamond Jubilee Medal (Queen Elizabeth II Commemorative Medal) 2012
- Cystic Fibrosis Canada Senior Scientist Training Award 2011
- Fellow, Canadian Academy of Health Sciences 2011
- Order of British Columbia (BC’s highest honour) 2009
- Doctor of Science, honoris causa, University of Guelph 2008
- Killam Prize (Canada Council’s prize for Health Research) 2007
- Michael Smith Prize in Health Research, Canada’s Health Researcher of the Year (Canadian Institutes for Health Research top award) 2006
- McLaughlin Medal, Royal Society of Canada (For important research of sustained excellence in medical science) 2005
- Fellow of the Infectious Diseases Society of America 2005
- Chairman’s Award for Career Achievement, BC Innovation Council (For career achievement in science) 2004
- Zellers Senior Scientist Award, Canadian Cystic Fibrosis Foundation (Top research award of CCFF) 2003-04
- Aventis ICAAC Antimicrobial Research Award (Leading award worldwide for antimicrobial research, from the American Society for Microbiology) 2003
- Honorary Member, International Golden Key Society 2002-06
- Fellow of the American Academy of Microbiology 2002
- Jubilee Medal (Commemorative Medal for 50th anniversary of the reign of Queen Elizabeth II) 2002
- Canada Research Chair (Tier 1) in Microbiology, renewed twice 2001; 2008-2014 and 2015-2021
- Officer of the Order of Canada (Canada’s second highest honour) 2001
- Innovation and Achievement Award, BC Biotech (BC’s top prize for Biotech) 2001
- MRC/CIHR Distinguished Scientist Award (Major Salary award of CIHR, received in first year of program) 1995-00
- Fellow of the Royal Society of Canada 1994
- Canadian Society of Microbiologists/New England Biolabs Lecturer 1992
- 125th Anniversary of Canada Silver Medal (From Government of Canada for service to Cystic Fibrosis) 1993
- Canadian Society of Microbiologists (CSM) Award (Youngest winner of top Microbiology award in Canada) 1987

== Ventures ==
Hancock co-founded the following companies:

- ABT Innovations
- Centre for Drug Research and Development (CDRD)
- Inimex Pharmaceuticals
- Migenix
- Sepset Biotherapeutics
