= Philotheca eremicola =

Conservation status
- Priority One — Poorly Known Taxa (DEC)

Scientific classification
- Kingdom: Plantae
- Clade: Embryophytes
- Clade: Tracheophytes
- Clade: Spermatophytes
- Clade: Angiosperms
- Clade: Eudicots
- Clade: Rosids
- Order: Sapindales
- Family: Rutaceae
- Genus: Philotheca
- Species: P. eremicola

Binomial name
- Philotheca eremicola Paul G.Wilson

Species of plant

Philotheca eremicola is a species of flowering plant in the family Rutaceae and is endemic to Western Australia. It is a small shrub similar to Philotheca coateana but has smaller leaves and different sepals.

== Description ==
Philotheca eremicola is a shrub that grows to a height of about 2.5 m (8 ft 2 in) and has glabrous branchlets. The leaves are crowded near the ends of the branchlets, about 2.5 mm (0.098 in) long, glossy green and glandular-warty. The flowers are borne singly on the ends of the branchlets on slender pedicels about 4 mm (0.16 in) long. There are five egg-shaped to narrow triangular sepals about 3 mm (0.12 in) long with prominent brown glands and five elliptical, white petals with a pink midline and 7–9 mm (0.28–0.35 in) long. The ten stamens are free from each other and hairy.

== Taxonomy and naming ==
Philotheca eremicola was first formally described in 1998 by Paul Wilson in the journal Nuytsia from specimens collected by D.J. Pearson near the Tjirrkarli Community in the Gibson Desert.

== Distribution ==
This species of philotheca is only known from the type location in the Gibson Desert.

== Conservation status ==
This species is classified as "Priority One" by the Government of Western Australia Department of Parks and Wildlife, meaning that it is known from only one or a few locations which are potentially at risk.
