= Philotheca nutans =

Conservation status
- Priority One — Poorly Known Taxa (DEC)

Scientific classification
- Kingdom: Plantae
- Clade: Embryophytes
- Clade: Tracheophytes
- Clade: Spermatophytes
- Clade: Angiosperms
- Clade: Eudicots
- Clade: Rosids
- Order: Sapindales
- Family: Rutaceae
- Genus: Philotheca
- Species: P. nutans

Binomial name
- Philotheca nutans (Paul G.Wilson) Paul G.Wilson

Synonyms
- Eriostemon nutans Paul G.Wilson

Species of plant

Philotheca nutans is a species of flowering plant in the family Rutaceae and is endemic to the south-west of Western Australia. It is a small, densely-branched shrub with club-shaped to cylindrical, glandular-warty leaves and pendent, pale yellow to pale red flowers arranged singly in leaf axils.

== Description ==
Philotheca nutans is a densely-branched shrub that grows to a height of 30–90 cm (12–35 in) with glandular-warty branchlets. The leaves are cylindrical to club-shaped, about 11 mm (0.43 in) long and glandular-warty on the lower surface. The flowers are pendent and borne singly in leaf axils, each flower on a thin pedicel about 8 mm (0.31 in) long. There are five broadly egg-shaped sepals about 2.5 mm (0.098 in) long and five broadly egg-shaped, pale yellow to pale red petals 7–10 mm (0.28–0.39 in). The ten stamens are densely woolly-hairy. Flowering occurs from July to September.

== Taxonomy and naming ==
This philotheca was first formally described in 1970 by Paul Wilson who gave it the name Eriostemon nutans and published the description in the journal Nuytsia from specimens collected by Charles Gardner in 1953. In 1998, Wilson changed the name to Philotheca nutans in the same journal.

== Distribution and habitat ==
Philotheca nutans grows in woodland near the Wubin-Paynes Find road in the south-west of Western Australia.

== Conservation status ==
Philotheca nutans is classified as "Priority One" by the Government of Western Australia Department of Parks and Wildlife, meaning that it is known from only one or a few locations which are potentially at risk.
