= Philotheca citrina =

Conservation status
- Priority One — Poorly Known Taxa (DEC)

Scientific classification
- Kingdom: Plantae
- Clade: Embryophytes
- Clade: Tracheophytes
- Clade: Spermatophytes
- Clade: Angiosperms
- Clade: Eudicots
- Clade: Rosids
- Order: Sapindales
- Family: Rutaceae
- Genus: Philotheca
- Species: P. citrina

Binomial name
- Philotheca citrina Paul G.Wilson

Species of plant

Philotheca citrina is a species of flowering plant in the family Rutaceae and is endemic to Western Australia. It is a much-branched shrub with curved, narrow club-shaped leaves and pale yellowish green flowers arranged singly on the ends of branchlets.

== Description ==
Philotheca citrina is a much-branched shrub that grows to a height of 1.3 m (4 ft 3 in). The leaves are narrow club-shaped and curved, about 10 mm (0.39 in) long with warty glands and a pointed tip. The flowers are borne singly on the ends of the branchlets, each flower on a pedicel 2–4 mm (0.079–0.157 in) long. There are broadly egg-shaped sepals about 3 mm (0.12 in) long and five broadly elliptical, pale yellowish green petals about 10 mm (0.39 in) long. The ten stamens are hairy and fused together in the lower part. Flowering occurs from May to September.

== Taxonomy and naming ==
Philotheca citrina was first formally described in 1992 by Paul Wilson in the journal Nuytsia from specimens collected by Raymond Jeffrey Cranfield in the Murchison region.

== Distribution and habitat ==
This species of philotheca grows on granitic breakaway country in the Muchison River area east of Shark Bay.

== Conservation status ==
This species is classified as is classified as "Priority One" by the Government of Western Australia Department of Parks and Wildlife, meaning that it is known from only one or a few locations which are potentially at risk.
