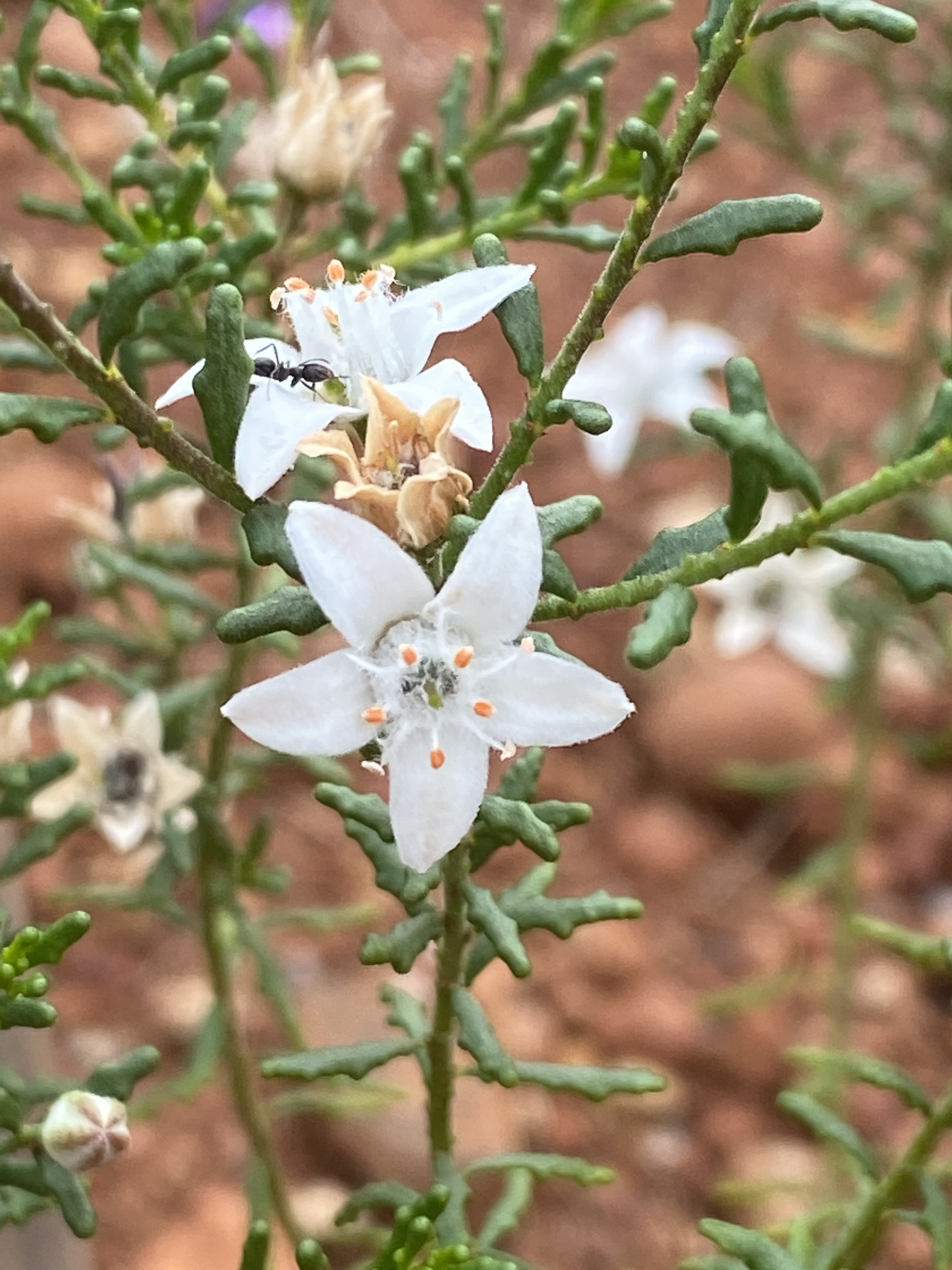
- Philotheca difformis subsp. difformis

Scientific classification
- Kingdom: Plantae
- Clade: Tracheophytes
- Clade: Angiosperms
- Clade: Eudicots
- Clade: Rosids
- Order: Sapindales
- Family: Rutaceae
- Genus: Philotheca
- Species: P. difformis

Binomial name
- Philotheca difformis (A.Cunn. ex Endl.) Paul G.Wilson

Synonyms
- Eriostemon difforme Endl. orth. var.; Eriostemon difformis A.Cunn. ex Endl.; Eriostemon rhombeum Lindl. orth. var.; Eriostemon rhombeus Lindl.

= Philotheca difformis =

Species of plant

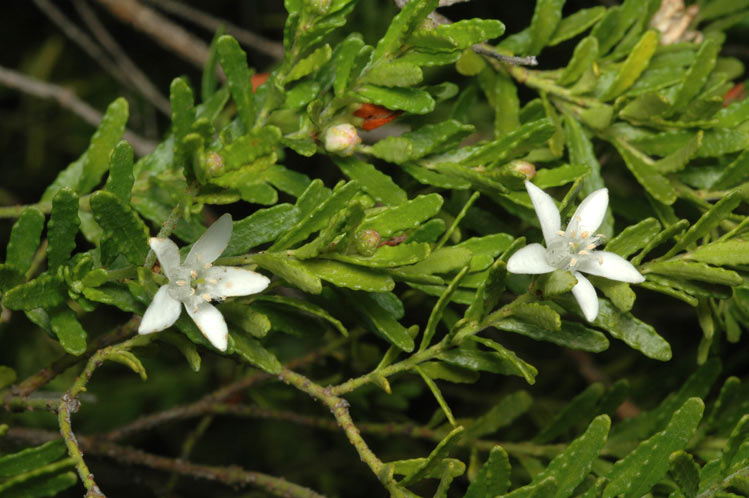
Subspecies smithiana in the ANBG

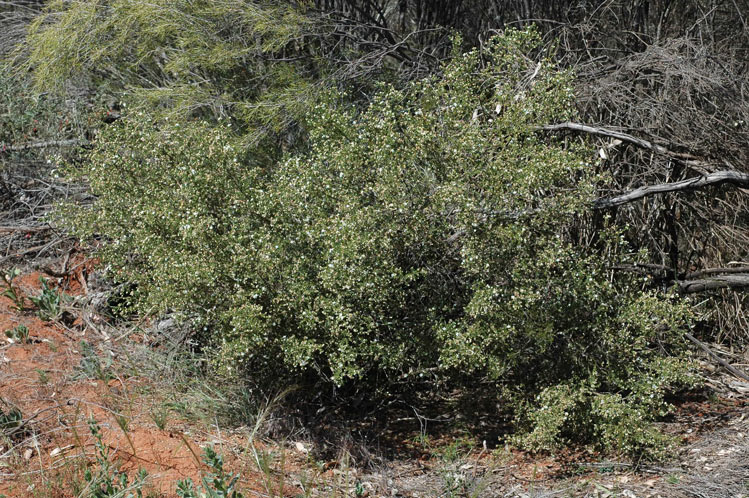
Habit of subspecies difformis near Goolgowi

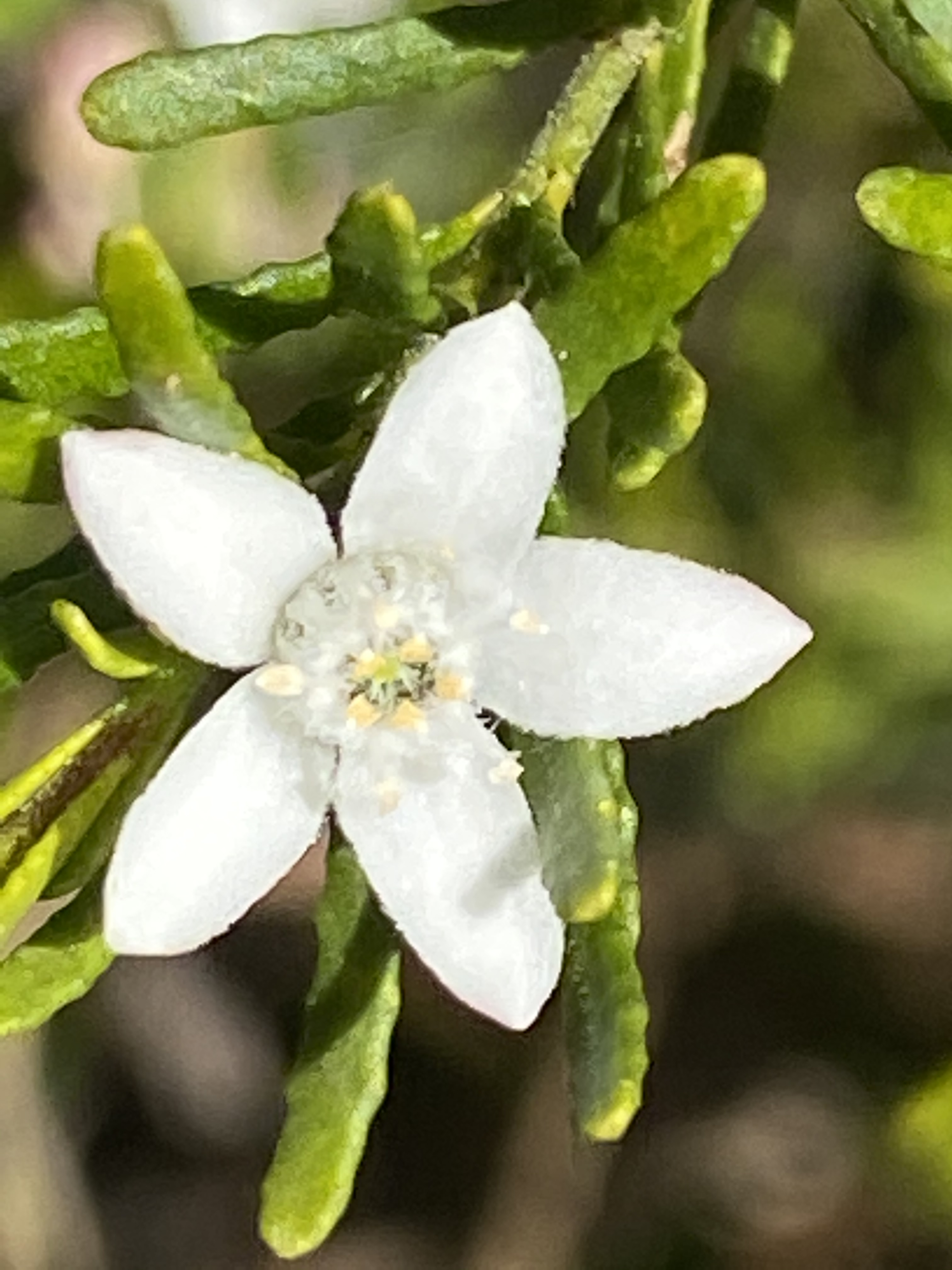
Subspecies smithiana flower and foliage

Philotheca difformis is a species of flowering plant in the family Rutaceae and is endemic to continental eastern Australia. It is a shrub with variably-shaped leaves depending on subspecies, and white flowers arranged singly or in groups of up to four on the ends of the branchlets. Subspecies difformis is commonly known as the small-leaf wax-flower.

== Description ==
Philotheca difformis is a shrub that grows to a height of about 1–2 m (3 ft 3 in – 6 ft 7 in) and has glandular-warty branchlets. The leaves are fleshy, glabrous, glandular warty on a short petiole but vary in size and shaped depending on subspecies. Subspecies difformis has fleshy leaves that are more or less cylindrical, about 8 mm (0.31 in) long and 1 mm (0.039 in) wide and subspecies smithiana has leaves that are flat, more or less egg-shaped, about 4 mm (0.16 in) long and 2 mm (0.079 in) wide. The flowers are borne singly or in clusters of two to four on the ends of the branchlets, each flower on a pedicel 2–3 mm (0.079–0.118 in) long. There are five fleshy triangular sepals and five oblong white petals 4–5 mm (0.16–0.20 in) long with a thick midrib. The ten stamens are woolly-hairy. Flowering occurs sporadically throughout the year and the fruit is about 5 mm (0.20 in) long, warty and beaked.

== Taxonomy and naming ==
This species was first formally described in 1837 by Stephan Endlicher from an unpublished description by Allan Cunningham who gave it the name Eriostemon difformis. Endlicher published the description in Enumaratio plantarum. Cunningham collected the type specimens in "sterile country on the Lachlan River" on 24 May 1817, during John Oxley's first expedition.

In 1998, Wilson changed the name to Philotheca difformis in the journal Nuytsia and described two subspecies:

- Philotheca difformis (A.Cunn. ex Endl.) Paul G. Wilson subsp. difformis;
- Philotheca difformis subsp. smithiana (Benth.) Paul G. Wilson.

== Distribution and habitat ==
Philotheca difformis subspecies difformis grows in rocky areas in woodland, mainly in inland parts of south-east Queensland, inland New South Wales, north-west Victoria and the Flinders Ranges in South Australia.

Subspecies smithiana often grows on rock outcrops and is found near the coast in south-east Queensland and in north-eastern New South Wales as far south as Singleton.
