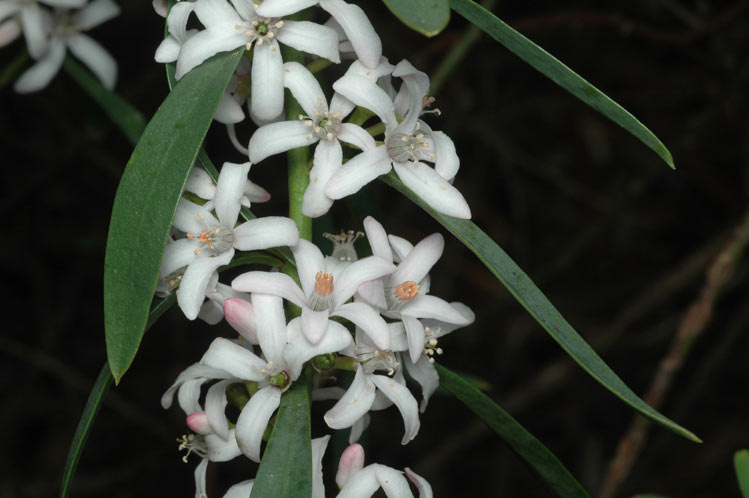
- In the ANBG

Scientific classification
- Kingdom: Plantae
- Clade: Tracheophytes
- Clade: Angiosperms
- Clade: Eudicots
- Clade: Rosids
- Order: Sapindales
- Family: Rutaceae
- Genus: Philotheca
- Species: P. conduplicata

Binomial name
- Philotheca conduplicata (Paul G.Wilson) P.I.Forst.

Synonyms
- Eriostemon myoporoides subsp. conduplicatus Paul G.Wilson; Philotheca myoporoides subsp. conduplicata (Paul G.Wilson) Bayly

= Philotheca conduplicata =

Species of plant

Philotheca conduplicata is a species of flowering plant in the family Rutaceae and is endemic to eastern Australia. It is a shrub with elliptical leaves clustered near the ends of the branchlets and white flowers arranged singly or in two or threes on the ends of the branchlets.

== Description ==
Philotheca conduplicata is a shrub that grows to a height of about 2 m (6 ft 7 in) and has smooth branchlets. The leaves are more or less clustered near the ends of the branchlets and are elliptical, slightly curved, 40–70 mm (1.6–2.8 in) long and 4–14 mm (0.16–0.55 in) wide and folded lengthwise. The flowers are borne singly or in twos or threes on the ends of the branchlets on a thick peduncle about 4 mm (0.16 in) long, each flower on a thick pedicel 2–4 mm (0.079–0.157 in) long. There are five broadly triangular sepals with a fleshy centre and five elliptical to lance-shaped white petals about 6–11 mm (0.24–0.43 in) long and 2.5–3.5 mm (0.098–0.138 in) wide. The ten stamens are moderately hairy. Flowering occurs from July to September and the fruit is 6–9 mm (0.24–0.35 in) long and beaked.

== Taxonomy and naming ==
This species was first formally described in 1970 by Paul G. Wilson who gave it the name Eriostemon myoporoides subsp. conduplicatus and published the description in the journal Nuytsia, from specimens collected by Joseph Maiden and Ernst Betche near Howell (north of Bundarra in 1905. In 2005 Paul Irwin Forster raised the subspecies to species status as Philotheca conduplicata in the journal Austrobaileya.

== Distribution and habitat ==
Philotheca conduplicata grows among granite boulders in the Granite Belt in northern New South Wales and south-eastern Queensland.
