= Philotheca glabra =

Scientific classification
- Kingdom: Plantae
- Clade: Embryophytes
- Clade: Tracheophytes
- Clade: Spermatophytes
- Clade: Angiosperms
- Clade: Eudicots
- Clade: Rosids
- Order: Sapindales
- Family: Rutaceae
- Genus: Philotheca
- Species: P. glabra

Binomial name
- Philotheca glabra (Paul G.Wilson) Paul G.Wilson

Synonyms
- Eriostemon glaber Paul G.Wilson

Species of plant

Philotheca glabra is a species of flowering plant in the family Rutaceae and is endemic to the inland south-west of Western Australia. It is a small shrub with elliptical to club-shaped leaves and white flowers tinged with pink and arranged singly or in twos or three on the ends of branchlets.

== Description ==
Philotheca glabra is a shrub that grows to a height of 0.5–1.6 m (1 ft 8 in – 5 ft 3 in) with corky branchlets. The leaves are elliptical to club-shaped, 2–3 mm (0.079–0.118 in) long with warty glands. The flowers are borne singly or in twos or threes on the ends of the branchlets, each flower on a pedicel 1–4 mm (0.039–0.157 in) long. There are five egg-shaped to round sepals about 1.5 mm (0.059 in) long and five elliptic, white petals tinged with pink on the back and about 7 mm (0.28 in) long. The ten stamens are free from each other and woolly-hairy. Flowering occurs from July to October and the fruit is about 3 mm (0.12 in) long.

== Taxonomy and naming ==
This philotheca was first formally described in 1970 by Paul Wilson who gave it the name Eriostemon glaber and published the description in the journal Nuytsia from specimens collected by Max Koch near Cowcowing in 1904. In 1998, Wilson changed the name to Philotheca glabra in the same journal.

== Distribution and habitat ==
Philotheca glabra grows in heathland between Mullewa and Wubin in the inland south-west of Western Australia.

== Conservation status ==
This species is classified as "not threatened" by the Department of Environment and Conservation (Western Australia).
