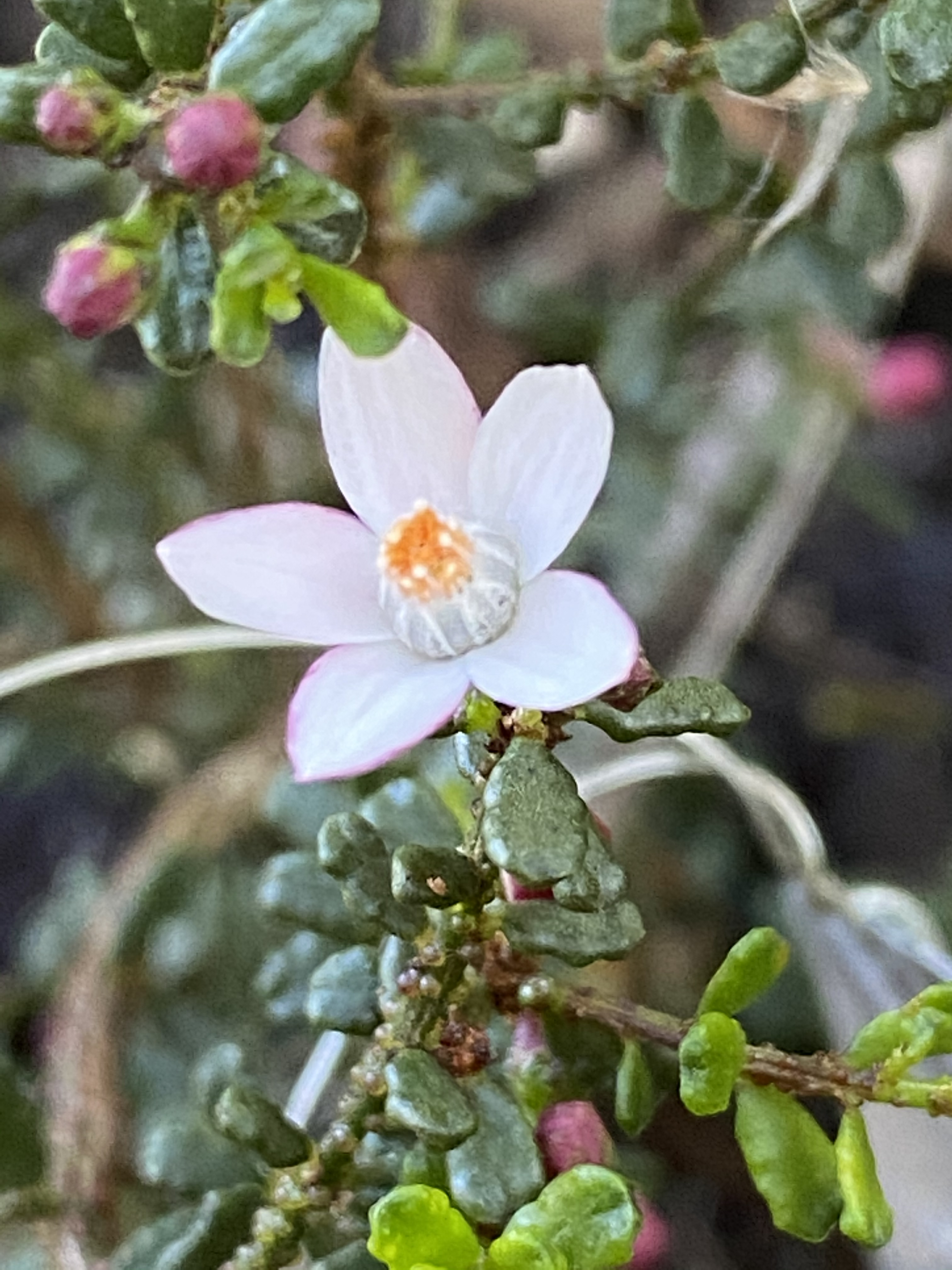
- Philotheca angustifolia subsp. montana in the ANBG

Scientific classification
- Kingdom: Plantae
- Clade: Tracheophytes
- Clade: Angiosperms
- Clade: Eudicots
- Clade: Rosids
- Order: Sapindales
- Family: Rutaceae
- Genus: Philotheca
- Species: P. angustifolia

Binomial name
- Philotheca angustifolia (Paul G.Wilson) Paul G.Wilson

Synonyms
- Eriostemon angustifolius Paul G.Wilson; Eriostemon brevifolius J.M.Black

= Philotheca angustifolia =

Narrow-leaf wax-flower

Species of plant

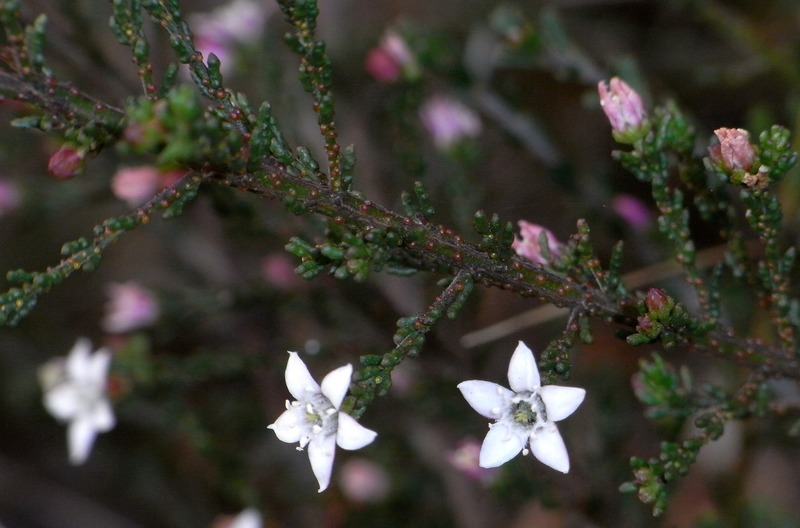
Subspecies angustifolia near Elmore

Philotheca angustifolia, commonly known as narrow-leaf wax flower, is a species of flowering plant in the family Rutaceae and is endemic to south-eastern Australia. It is a shrub with small leaves and white flowers with five egg-shaped petals in spring.

== Description ==
Philotheca angustifolia is a shrub that grows to a height of 0.3–2 m (1 ft 0 in – 6 ft 7 in) with its stems covered with warty glands and a few hairs in grooves between the leaf axils. The leaves are cylindrical to club-shaped or egg-shaped, sessile, glandular-warty, 2–10 mm (0.079–0.394 in) long and 1–2 mm (0.039–0.079 in) wide. The flowers are borne singly or in groups of up to four on the ends of the branchlets, each flower on a pedicel 0.5–4 mm (0.020–0.157 in) long. There are five triangular sepals about 1 mm (0.039 in) long and five egg-shaped white petals 5–8 mm (0.20–0.31 in) long, usually with a pink midline. There are ten stamens each with a small white appendage on the anther, the stamens nearer the sepals with an awl-shaped tip.

== Taxonomy and naming ==
Narrow-leaf wax flower was first formally described in 1970 by Paul Wilson who gave it the name Eriostemon angustifolius and published the description in the journal Nuytsia. The type specimen was collected in the lower Mount Lofty Ranges by Darrell Kraehenbuehl. In 1998 Wilson transferred the species to the genus Philotheca as P. angustifolia.

In 1970, Wilson described also described two subspecies of Eriostemon angustifolius, subspecies angustifolius and subspecies montanus. The subspecies were also transferred to Philotheca and the names have been accepted by the Australian Plant Census:

- Philotheca angustifolia subsp. angustifolia has cylindrical or club-shaped leaves 2–10 mm (0.079–0.394 in) long and less than 1 mm (0.039 in) wide;
- Philotheca angustifolia subsp. montana has egg-shaped leaves with the narrower end towards the base and about 4 mm (0.16 in) long and 2 mm (0.079 in) wide.

== Distribution and habitat ==
Narrow-leaf wax flower grows in open woodland and mallee. Subspecies angustifolia occurs in central Victoria and in south-eastern South Australia. There is a single record from 1882 in southern New South Wales. Subspecies montana only occurs in mountainous areas in western Victoria.
