= Philotheca obovalis =

Scientific classification
- Kingdom: Plantae
- Clade: Embryophytes
- Clade: Tracheophytes
- Clade: Spermatophytes
- Clade: Angiosperms
- Clade: Eudicots
- Clade: Rosids
- Order: Sapindales
- Family: Rutaceae
- Genus: Philotheca
- Species: P. obovalis

Binomial name
- Philotheca obovalis (Cunn.) Paul G.Wilson

Synonyms
- Eriostemon obovale A.Cunn. orth. var.; Eriostemon obovalis A.Cunn.

Species of plant

Philotheca obovalis is a species of flowering plant in the family Rutaceae and is endemic to New South Wales. It is a small shrub with broadly egg-shaped to heart-shaped leaves with the narrower end towards the base, and white flowers tinged with pink and arranged singly in leaf axils.

== Description ==
Philotheca obovalis is a shrub that grows to a height of 1 m (3 ft 3 in) with slightly hairy stems. The leaves are broadly egg-shaped to heart-shaped with the narrower end towards the base, 6–10 mm (0.24–0.39 in) long, 4–6 mm (0.16–0.24 in) wide and slightly warty on the lower surface. The flowers are borne singly in leaf axils on a pedicel 2–3 mm (0.079–0.118 in) long with six small bracteoles at the base. There are five round sepals about 1 mm (0.039 in) long and five elliptical white petals tinged with pink and about 6 mm (0.24 in) long. The ten stamens are about 3.5 mm (0.14 in) long and hairy. Flowering occurs in spring and the fruit is about 4.5 mm (0.18 in) long.

== Taxonomy ==
This philotheca was first formally described in 1825 by Allan Cunningham who gave it the name Eriostemon ovalis and published the description in the chapter On the Botany of the Blue Mountains in Barron Field's book Geographical Memoirs on New South Wales. Cunningham collected the type specimens on the "verge of the Regent's Glen, Blue Mountains". In 1998, Paul G. Wilson changed the name to Philotheca obovalis in the journal Nuysia.

== Distribution and habitat ==
Philotheca obovalis grows in heath on sandstone, mainly in the Blue Mountains of eastern New South Wales.
