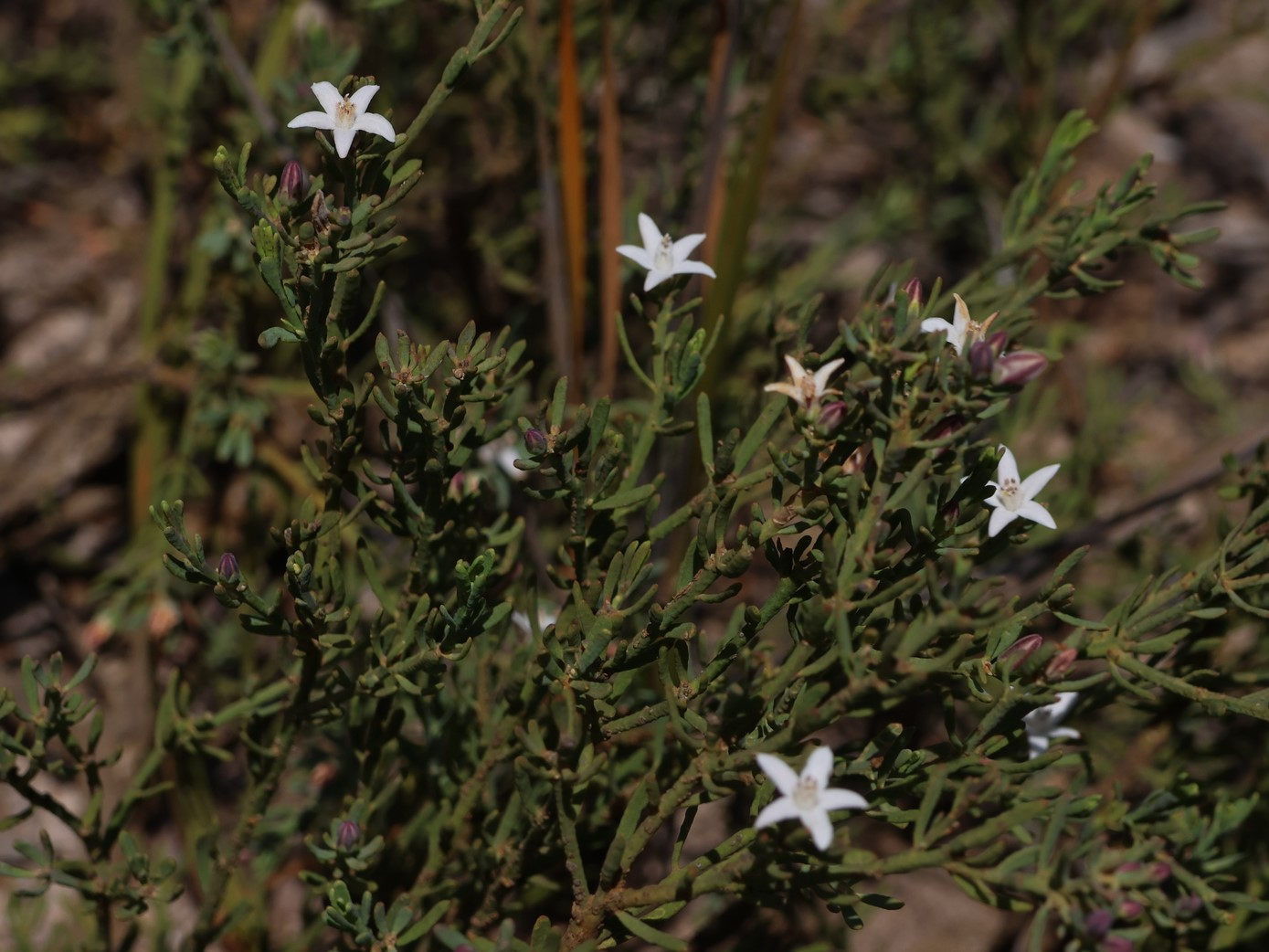

Conservation status
- Priority Two — Poorly Known Taxa (DEC)

Scientific classification
- Kingdom: Plantae
- Clade: Tracheophytes
- Clade: Angiosperms
- Clade: Eudicots
- Clade: Rosids
- Order: Sapindales
- Family: Rutaceae
- Genus: Philotheca
- Species: P. cymbiformis

Binomial name
- Philotheca cymbiformis (Paul G.Wilson) Paul G.Wilson

Synonyms
- Eriostemon cymbiformis Paul G.Wilson

= Philotheca cymbiformis =

Species of plant

Philotheca cymbiformis is a species of flowering plant in the family Rutaceae and is endemic to the south-western area of Western Australia. It is a low, spreading small shrub with fleshy, narrow elliptic leaves and single white and reddish brown flowers on the ends of branchlets.

== Description ==
Philotheca cymbiformis is a shrub that grows to a height of 0.1–0.5 m (3.9 in – 1 ft 7.7 in) with greyish, glabrous stems. The leaves are narrow elliptical, fleshy, 6–10 mm (0.24–0.39 in) long and smooth or slightly glandular-warty. The flowers are borne singly on the ends of branchlets, each flower on a pedicel about 1.5 mm (0.059 in) long. There are five triangular sepals about 1.5 mm (0.059 in) long and five egg-shaped white petals with a reddish-brown stripe and about 6 mm (0.24 in) long. The ten stamens each that are free from each other and densely hairy near the base. Flowering occurs from September to November.

== Taxonomy and naming ==
This philotheca was first formally described in 1971 by Paul Wilson who gave it the name Eriostemon cymbiformis and published the description in the journal Nuytsia from specimens he collected in the Fitzgerald River Reserve. In 1998, Wilson changed the name to Philotheca cymbiformis in the same journal.

== Distribution and habitat ==
Philotheca cymbiformis grows on sand in the Fitzgerald River National Park.

== Conservation status ==
This species is classified as "Priority Two" by the Western Australian Government Department of Parks and Wildlife meaning that it is poorly known and from only one or a few locations.
