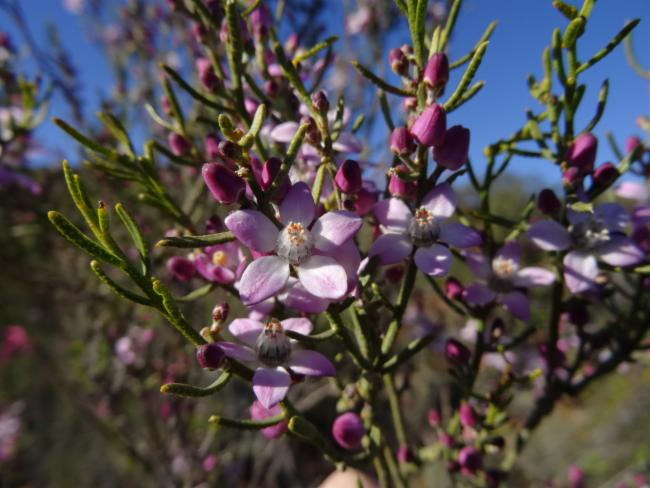
- Philotheca brucei near Paynes Find

Scientific classification
- Kingdom: Plantae
- Clade: Tracheophytes
- Clade: Angiosperms
- Clade: Eudicots
- Clade: Rosids
- Order: Sapindales
- Family: Rutaceae
- Genus: Philotheca
- Species: P. brucei

Binomial name
- Philotheca brucei (F.Muell.) Paul G.Wilson

Synonyms
- Eriostemon brucei F.Muell.

= Philotheca brucei =

Narrow-leaf wax-flower

Species of shrub

Philotheca brucei is a species of flowering plant in the family Rutaceae and is endemic to Western Australia. It is a shrub with cylindrical leaves grooved along the top and in spring, white to pink or mauve flowers with five egg-shaped petals.

== Description ==
Philotheca brucei is a shrub that grows to a height of 2 m (6 ft 7 in) with erect branchlets. The leaves are thin cylindrical to narrow oblong, up to 15 mm (0.59 in) long, with the upper surface dished or channelled, sometimes densely covered with star-shaped hairs. The flowers are borne singly on a pedicel 0.5–4 mm (0.020–0.157 in) long. There are five more or less fleshy, round sepals about 1 mm (0.039 in) long and five broadly egg-shaped, glabrous, white to pale pink or mauve petals about 4.5 mm (0.18 in) long. There are ten stamens each with an anther 0.5–1 mm (0.020–0.039 in) long.

== Taxonomy and naming ==
This species was first formally described in 1869 by Ferdinand von Mueller who gave it the name Eriostemon brucei and published the description in Fragmenta phytographiae Australiae. The specific epithet (brucei) honours John Bruce who was for a time the acting governor of Western Australia.

In 1970 Paul Wilson described three subspecies, brevifolia, brucei and cinerea. The descriptions were published in the journal Nuytsia. In 1990, Wilson transferred Eriostemon brucei to the genus Philotheca as P. brucei. He also transferred the three subspecies to Philotheca and the names have been accepted by the Australian Plant Census:

- Philotheca brucei subsp. brevifolia (Paul G.Wilson) Paul G.Wilson has densely hairy leaves that are only up to1.5 mm (0.059 in) long;
- Philotheca brucei (F.Muell.) Paul G.Wilson subsp. brucei has more or less cylindrical leaves that are glabrous when mature;
- Philotheca brucei subsp. cinerea (Paul G.Wilson) Paul G.Wilson. has densely hairy, oblong leaves.

== Distribution and habitat ==
Subspecies brevifolia grows on rocky hills between Paynes Find and Sandstone. Subspecies brucei grows on rocky hills and breakaways within 500 km (310 mi) of the west coast of Western Australia. Subspecies cinerea grows on laterite breakaways near the upper Murchison River.

== Conservation status ==
All three subspecies of Philotheca brucei are classified as "not threatened" by the Western Australian Government Department of Parks and Wildlife.
