= Philotheca ericifolia =

Scientific classification
- Kingdom: Plantae
- Clade: Embryophytes
- Clade: Tracheophytes
- Clade: Spermatophytes
- Clade: Angiosperms
- Clade: Eudicots
- Clade: Rosids
- Order: Sapindales
- Family: Rutaceae
- Genus: Philotheca
- Species: P. ericifolia

Binomial name
- Philotheca ericifolia (A.Cunn. ex Benth.) Paul G.Wilson

Synonyms
- Eriostemon ericifolius A.Cunn. ex Benth.

Species of plant

Philotheca ericifolia is a species of flowering plant in the family Rutaceae and is endemic to New South Wales. It is a much-branched shrub with glandular-warty branchlets, needle-shaped leaves and white to pink flowers arranged singly or in groups of up to six on the ends of the branchlets.

== Description ==
Philotheca ericifolia is a much-branched, spreading shrub that typically grows to a height of 1–2 m (3 ft 3 in – 6 ft 7 in) and has glandular-warty branchlets. The leaves are needle-shaped, 4–8 mm (0.16–0.31 in) long, sparsely glandular warty and channelled on the upper surface. The flowers are borne singly or in clusters of up to six on the ends of the branchlets, each flower on a pedicel 2–3 mm (0.079–0.118 in) long. There are five fleshy, triangular sepals 1.5–2 mm (0.059–0.079 in) long and five elliptical white petals about 9 mm (0.35 in) long with a thick midrib. The ten stamens are densely hairy. Flowering occurs in spring and the fruit is 2–3 mm (0.079–0.118 in) long with a tapered beak.

== Taxonomy and naming ==
This species was first formally described in 1863 by George Bentham from an unpublished description by Allan Cunningham who gave it the name Eriostemon ericifolius. Bentham published the description in Flora Australiensis. Cunningham collected the type specimens in "on the skirts of the Liverpool Plains" in 1825.

In 1998, Wilson changed the name to Philotheca ericifolia in the journal Nuytsia.

== Distribution and habitat ==
Philotheca ericifolia grows in heath and forest, mainly in damp sandy flats and gullies. It is found in the upper Hunter Valley and in the northern Pilliga scrub.

== Conservation status ==
This philotheca was previously classified as "vulnerable" under the Australian Government Environment Protection and Biodiversity Conservation Act 1999 and the New South Wales Government Threatened Species Conservation Act but has been delisted from both.
