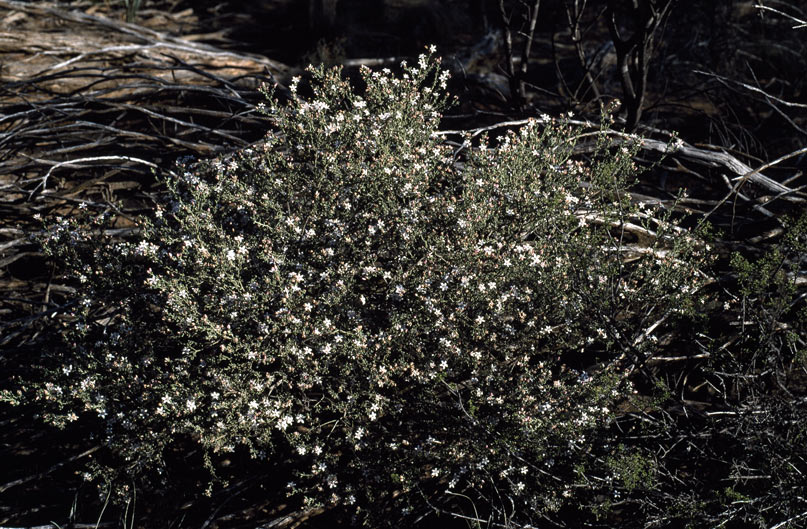
- Near Baladjie Rock

Scientific classification
- Kingdom: Plantae
- Clade: Embryophytes
- Clade: Tracheophytes
- Clade: Spermatophytes
- Clade: Angiosperms
- Clade: Eudicots
- Clade: Rosids
- Order: Sapindales
- Family: Rutaceae
- Genus: Philotheca
- Species: P. tomentella

Binomial name
- Philotheca tomentella (Diels) Paul G.Wilson

Synonyms
- Eriostemon stowardii S.Moore; Eriostemon tomentellus Diels

= Philotheca tomentella =

Species of flowering plant

Philotheca tomentella is a species of flowering plant in the family Rutaceae and is endemic to the south-west of Western Australia. It is an undershrub with small club-shaped to cylindrical leaves and white flowers with a pale red central stripe, arranged singly or in groups of up to four on the ends of branchlets.

== Description ==
Philotheca tomentella is an undershrub that typically grows to a height of 0.3–1.0 m (1 ft 0 in – 3 ft 3 in) and has slightly glandular-warty branchlets. The leaves are club-shaped to more or less cylindrical, 2–3 mm (0.079–0.118 in) long, flat on the upper surface and rounded on the lower. The flowers are arranged singly or in groups of up to four on the ends of branchlets, each flower on a pedicel 1.5–3 mm (0.059–0.118 in) long. The five sepals are broadly triangular to more or less round, about 1 mm (0.039 in) long with a tiny black tip. The five petals are egg-shaped and white with a pale red central stripe and 4–5.5 mm (0.16–0.22 in) long. The ten stamens are free from each other and the anthers have a prominent white appendage. Flowering occurs from August to October and the fruit is about 3.5 mm (0.14 in) long.

== Taxonomy ==
This species was first described in 1904 by Ludwig Diels and Ernst Georg Pritzel who gave it the name Erisotemon tomentellus in Botanische Jahrbücher für Systematik, Pflanzengeschichte und Pflanzengeographie. In 1998, Paul Wilson changed the name to Philotheca tomentella in the journal Nuytsia.

== Distribution and habitat ==
This philotheca grows in shrubland on sand between the Murchison Ranges, Lake Grace and Queen Victoria Spring area in the south-west of Western Australia.

== Conservation status ==
Philotheca tomentella is classified as "not threatened" by the Government of Western Australia Department of Parks and Wildlife.
