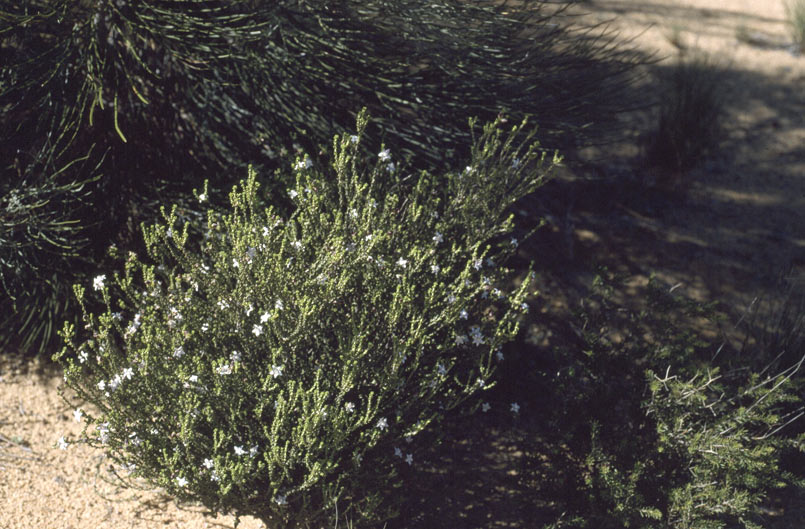
- Near Beacon

Scientific classification
- Kingdom: Plantae
- Clade: Embryophytes
- Clade: Tracheophytes
- Clade: Spermatophytes
- Clade: Angiosperms
- Clade: Eudicots
- Clade: Rosids
- Order: Sapindales
- Family: Rutaceae
- Genus: Philotheca
- Species: P. thryptomenoides

Binomial name
- Philotheca thryptomenoides (S.Moore) Paul G.Wilson

Synonyms
- Eriostemon thryptomenoides S.Moore

= Philotheca thryptomenoides =

Species of flowering plant

Philotheca thryptomenoides is a species of flowering plant in the family Rutaceae and is endemic to the south-west of Western Australia. It is a small undershrub with oval to club-shaped leaves and white flowers with a broad, reddish-brown stripe, arranged singly on the ends of branchlets.

== Description ==
Philotheca thryptomenoides is an undershrub that typically grows to a height of about 50 cm (20 in) and has smooth, dark-coloured to black branchlets. The leaves are oval to club-shaped, 1.5–3 mm (0.059–0.118 in) long and flat on the upper surface. The flowers are arranged singly on the ends of branchlets and are sessile or on a pedicel up to 2 mm (0.079 in) long. The five sepals are egg-shaped, 2–3 mm (0.079–0.118 in) long, and the five petals are narrowly egg-shaped, white with a central reddish-brown stripe and about 6 mm (0.24 in) long. The ten stamens are free from each other and densely hairy. Flowering occurs from July to September and the fruit is 1.5–2 mm (0.059–0.079 in) long.

== Taxonomy ==
This species was first described in 1920 by Spencer Le Marchant Moore who gave it the name Erisotemon thryptomenoides in the Journal of the Linnean Society, Botany. In 1998, Paul Wilson changed the name to Philotheca thryptomenoides in the journal Nuytsia.

== Distribution and habitat ==
This philotheca grows in shrubland on heavy soil in the Merredin-Wubin area in the south-west of Western Australia.

== Conservation status ==
Philotheca thryptomenoides is classified as "not threatened" by the Government of Western Australia Department of Parks and Wildlife.
