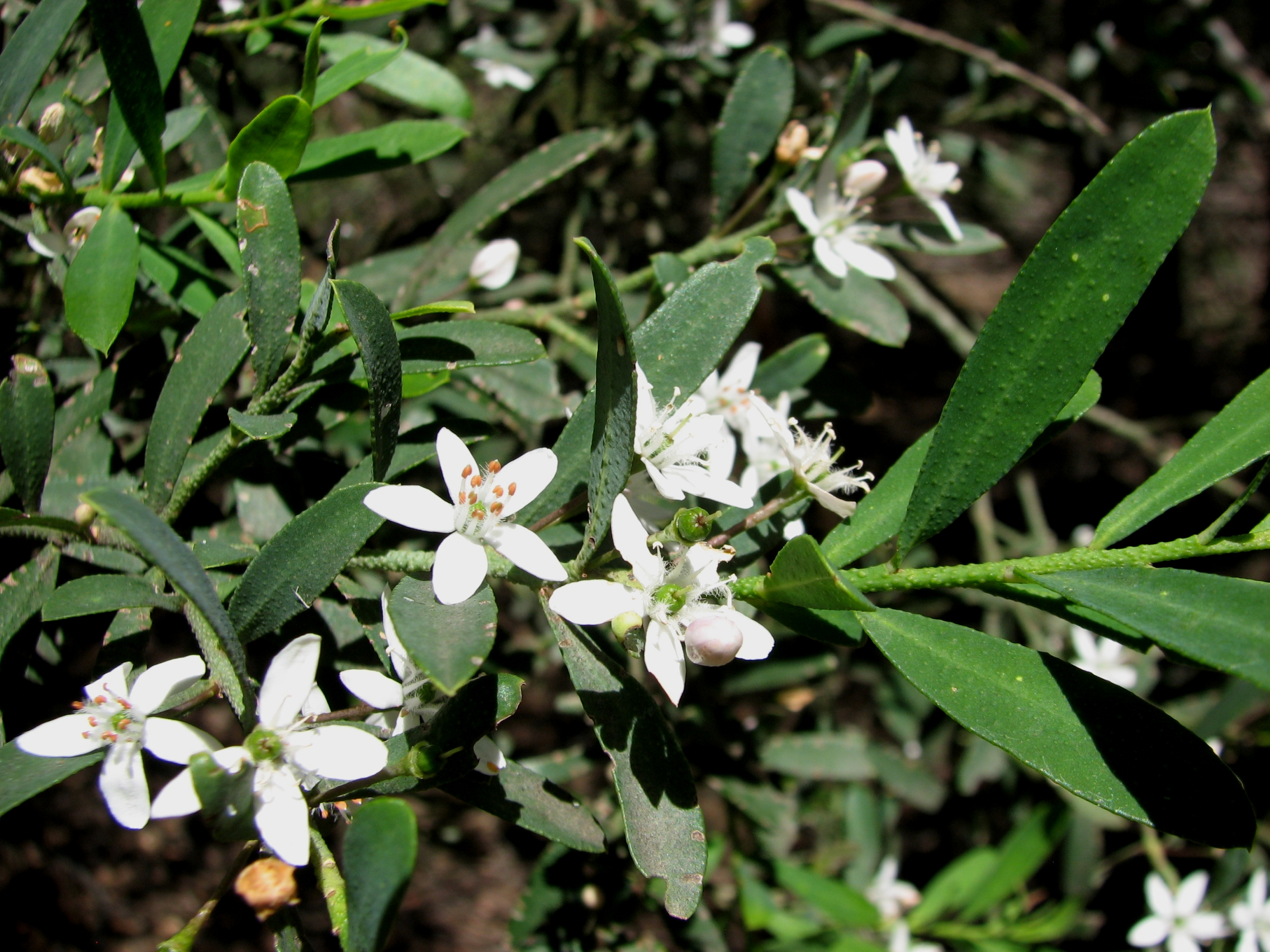

Scientific classification
- Kingdom: Plantae
- Clade: Embryophytes
- Clade: Tracheophytes
- Clade: Spermatophytes
- Clade: Angiosperms
- Clade: Eudicots
- Clade: Rosids
- Order: Sapindales
- Family: Rutaceae
- Genus: Philotheca
- Species: P. trachyphylla

Binomial name
- Philotheca trachyphylla (F.Muell.) Paul G.Wilson

Synonyms
- Eriostemon trachyphyllus F.Muell. nom. inval., nom. nud.; Eriostemon trachyphyllus F.Muell. var. trachyphyllus

= Philotheca trachyphylla =

Rock wax-flower

Species of flowering plant

Philotheca trachyphylla, commonly known as rock wax-flower, is a species of plant in the family Rutaceae and is endemic to south-eastern Australia. It is a shrub or small tree with glandular-warty, oblong to narrow egg-shaped leaves and white flowers arranged singly or in twos or threes, in leaf axils.

== Description ==
Philotheca trachyphylla is a shrub or small tree that typically grows to a height of 2–7 m (6 ft 7 in – 23 ft 0 in) and has cylindrical, glandular-warty branchlets. The leaves are oblong to elliptical or narrow egg-shaped with the narrower end towards the base, usually 30–50 mm (1.2–2.0 in) long and 5–9 mm (0.20–0.35 in) wide with small glandular-warty edges. The flowers are arranged singly or in twos or threes in leaf axils, each flower on a pedicel 6–12 mm (0.24–0.47 in) long. The five sepals are more or less round, about 1 mm (0.039 in) long and the petals are white, elliptical and 6–7 mm (0.24–0.28 in) long. The ten stamens are linear, tapering towards the tip and hairy.

== Taxonomy ==
Rock wax-flower was formally described in 1855 by Victorian Government Botanist Ferdinand von Mueller who gave it the name Eriostemon trachyphyllus and published the description in his book, Definitions of rare or hithertoo undescribed Australian Plants. In 1998, Paul Wilson changed the name to Philotheca trachyphylla in the journal Nuytsia.

== Distribution and habitat ==
Philotheca trachyphylla occurs on hillsides and in gullies within forests in New South Wales and Victoria. In New South Wales it is mainly found in coastal ranges south from Braidwood and in Victoria east from the Brythen-Ensay area.
