= Philotheca kalbarriensis =

Conservation status
- Priority Two — Poorly Known Taxa (DEC)

Scientific classification
- Kingdom: Plantae
- Clade: Embryophytes
- Clade: Tracheophytes
- Clade: Spermatophytes
- Clade: Angiosperms
- Clade: Eudicots
- Clade: Rosids
- Order: Sapindales
- Family: Rutaceae
- Genus: Philotheca
- Species: P. kalbarriensis

Binomial name
- Philotheca kalbarriensis Paul G.Wilson

Species of plant

Philotheca kalbarriensis is a species of flowering plant in the family Rutaceae and is endemic to Western Australia. It is a shrub with reddish brown branchlets and crowded, narrow spindle-shaped leaves and single white flowers arranged in leaf axils.

== Description ==
Philotheca kalbarriensis is a shrub that grows to a height of about 1 m (3 ft 3 in) and has reddish-brown branchlets. The leaves are crowded, narrow spindle-shaped, about 4 mm (0.16 in) long and grooved on the upper surface. The flowers are arranged singly in leaf axils on pedicels 1–2 mm (0.039–0.079 in) long. There are five fleshy, triangular sepals about 0.7 mm (0.028 in) long, five egg-shaped, white petals about 3 mm (0.12 in) long and 2 mm (0.079 in) wide and ten hairy stamens that are free from each other.

== Taxonomy and naming ==
Philotheca kalbarriensis was first formally described in 1998 by Paul Wilson in the journal Nuytsia from specimens collected in 1996 by Greg Keighery and Neil Gibson in Kalbarri National Park.

== Distribution and habitat ==
This species of philotheca grows in woodland from Kalbarri to near Mullewa.

== Conservation status ==
This species is classified as "Priority Two" by the Western Australian Government Department of Parks and Wildlife meaning that it is poorly known and from only one or a few locations.
