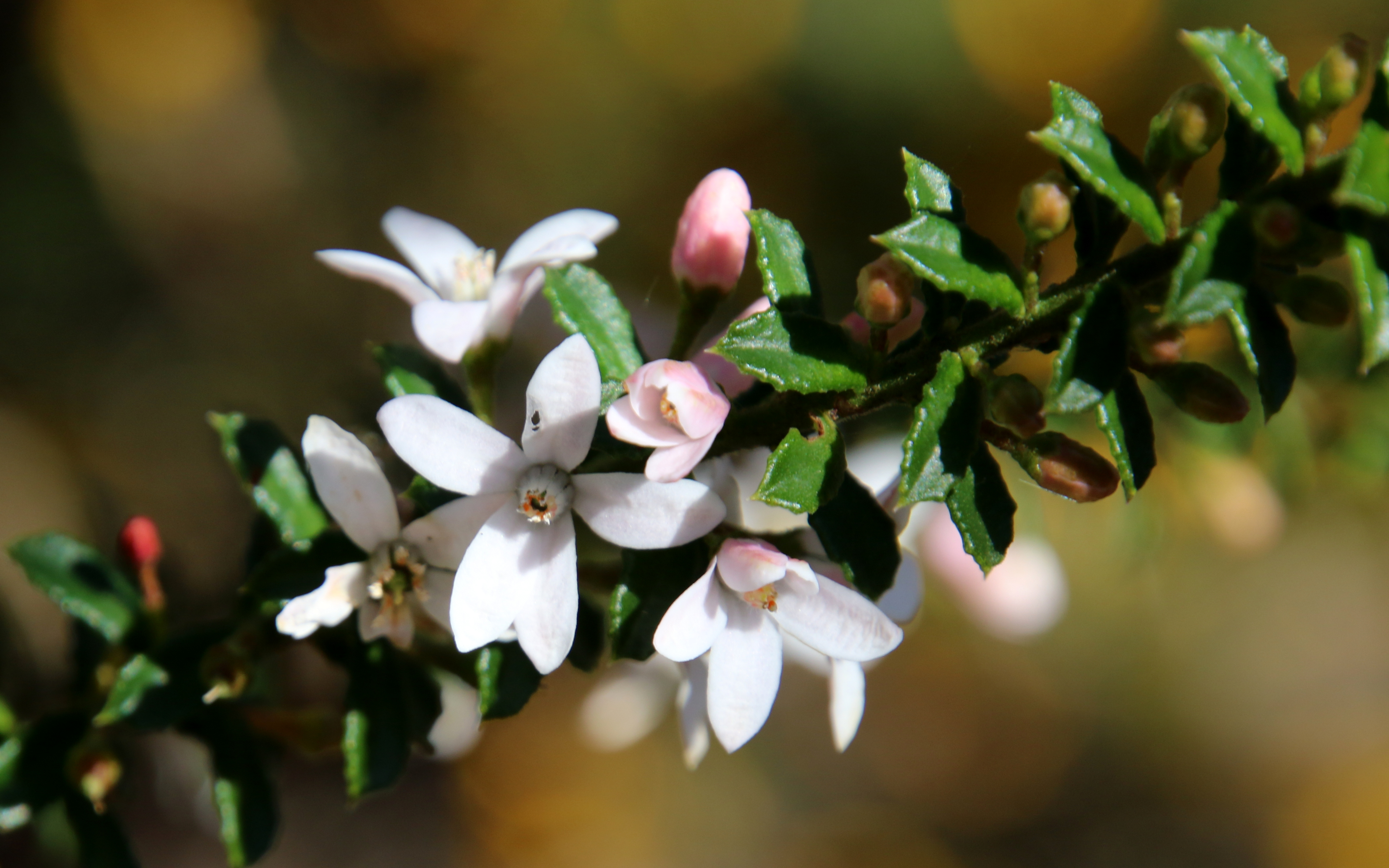
- In Ku-ring-gai Chase National Park

Scientific classification
- Kingdom: Plantae
- Clade: Embryophytes
- Clade: Tracheophytes
- Clade: Spermatophytes
- Clade: Angiosperms
- Clade: Eudicots
- Clade: Rosids
- Order: Sapindales
- Family: Rutaceae
- Genus: Philotheca
- Species: P. hispidula

Binomial name
- Philotheca hispidula (Sieber ex Spreng.) Paul G.Wilson

Synonyms
- Eriostemon hispidulus Sieber ex Spreng.

= Philotheca hispidula =

Species of plant

Philotheca hispidula commonly known as hairy wax-flower or spreading wax-flower, is a flowering plant in the citrus family and is endemic to New South Wales. It is a small shrub with narrow egg-shaped to wedge-shaped leaves that are glandular-wavy on the edges, and white or pale pink flowers arranged singly in leaf axils.

== Description ==
Philotheca hispidula is a shrub that typically grows to a height of about 1 m (3 ft 3 in) with slightly glandular-warty, finely bristly branchlets. The leaves are narrow egg-shaped to narrow wedge-shaped with the narrower end towards the base, 10–20 mm (0.39–0.79 in) long and 3–4 mm (0.12–0.16 in) wide. The flowers are usually arranged singly in leaf axils on a finely bristly peduncle 1–15 mm (0.039–0.591 in) long and a pedicel 3–5 mm (0.12–0.20 in) long. There are five semi-circular, fleshy-centred sepals about 1 mm (0.039 in) long and five broadly elliptical white or pale pink petals about 6.5 mm (0.26 in) long with a glandular keel. The ten stamens are slightly hairy. Flowering occurs in spring and the fruit is about 7 mm (0.28 in) long with a beak about 3 mm (0.12 in) long.

== Taxonomy ==
This species was first formally described in 1827 by Sprengel from an unpublished description by Franz Sieber and the description was published in Systema Vegetabilium. In 2005 Paul G. Wilson changed the name to Philotheca hispidula in the journal Nuytsia.

== Distribution and habitat ==
Philotheca hispidula grows in forest on sandstone in the Blue Mountains and in the Sydney region.
