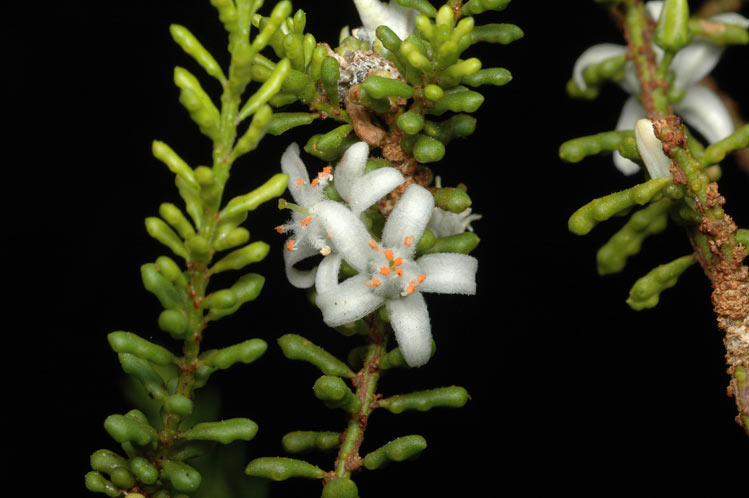
- In the Australian National Botanic Gardens

Conservation status
- Priority One — Poorly Known Taxa (DEC)

Scientific classification
- Kingdom: Plantae
- Clade: Embryophytes
- Clade: Tracheophytes
- Clade: Spermatophytes
- Clade: Angiosperms
- Clade: Eudicots
- Clade: Rosids
- Order: Sapindales
- Family: Rutaceae
- Genus: Philotheca
- Species: P. pachyphylla

Binomial name
- Philotheca pachyphylla (Paul G.Wilson) Paul G.Wilson

Synonyms
- Eriostemon pachyphyllus Paul G.Wilson

= Philotheca pachyphylla =

Species of plant

Philotheca pachyphylla is a species of flowering plant in the family Rutaceae and is endemic to Western Australia. It is a small shrub with fleshy, oblong, prominently glandular-warty leaves and white flowers arranged singly in leaf axils.

== Description ==
Philotheca pachyphylla is a shrub that grows to a height of 0.3–1.5 m (1 ft 0 in – 4 ft 11 in) and has branchlets that become corky with age. The leaves are fleshy, oblong, 3–5 mm (0.12–0.20 in) long, 1.5–2 mm (0.059–0.079 in) wide and prominently glandular-warty on the lower surface. The flowers are borne singly in leaf axils, each flower on a pedicel 2–3 mm (0.079–0.118 in) long. There are five egg-shaped sepals about 1.5 mm (0.059 in) long and five broadly oblong white petals about 5 mm (0.20 in) long. The ten stamens are free from each other and densely woolly-hairy. Flowering occurs from May to September.

== Taxonomy and naming ==
This philotheca was first formally described in 1970 by Paul Wilson who gave it the name Eriostemon pachyphyllus and published the description in the journal Nuytsia from specimens collected near Coolgardie by Marie Elizabeth Phillips in 1962. In 1998, Wilson changed the name to Philotheca pachyphylla in the same journal.

== Distribution and habitat ==
Philotheca pachyphylla grows in sandy loam on sandplains and hilltops west of Coolgardie and in the Bremer Range in the Coolgardie biogeographic region in Western Australia.

== Conservation status ==
Philotheca pachyphylla is classified as "Priority One" by the Government of Western Australia Department of Parks and Wildlife, meaning that it is known from only one or a few locations which are potentially at risk.
