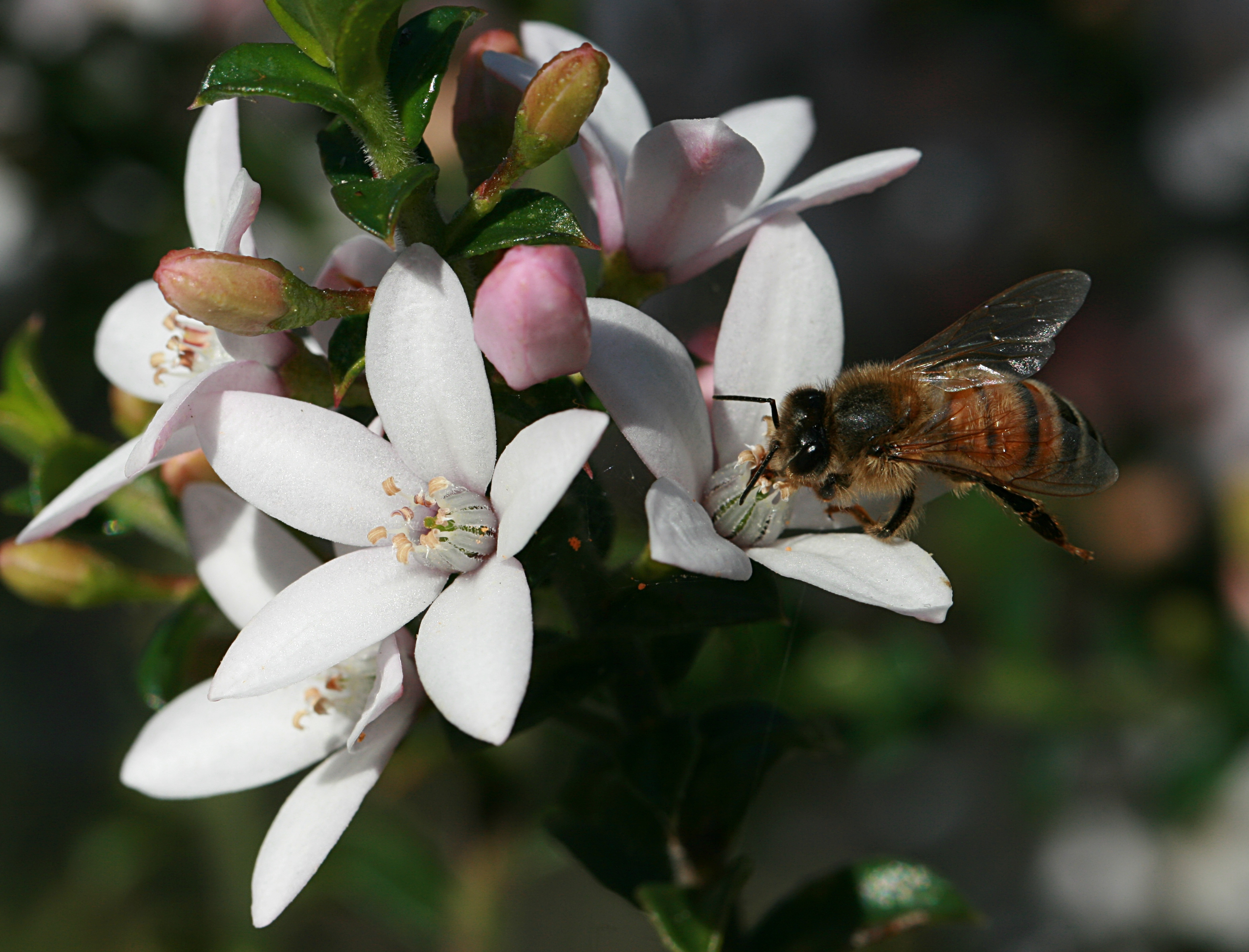
- Philotheca buxifolia

Scientific classification
- Kingdom: Plantae
- Clade: Tracheophytes
- Clade: Angiosperms
- Clade: Eudicots
- Clade: Rosids
- Order: Sapindales
- Family: Rutaceae
- Subfamily: Zanthoxyloideae
- Genus: Philotheca; Rudge

= Philotheca =

Genus of flowering plants

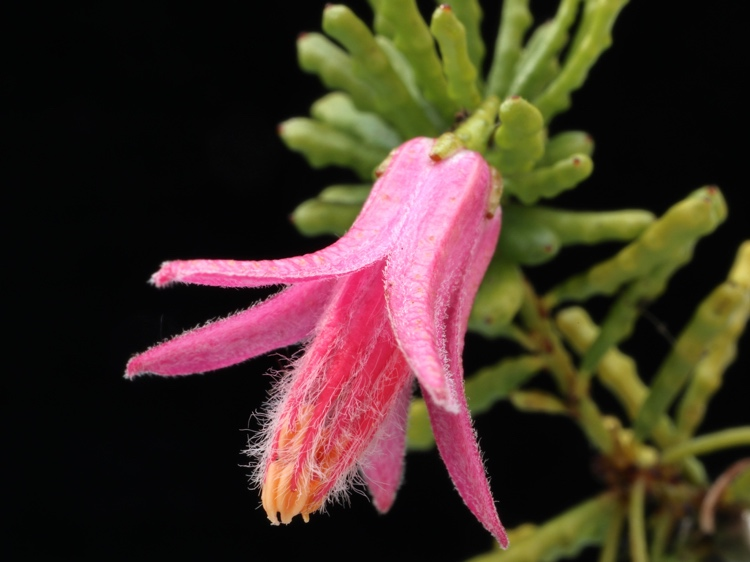
Philotheca coccinea

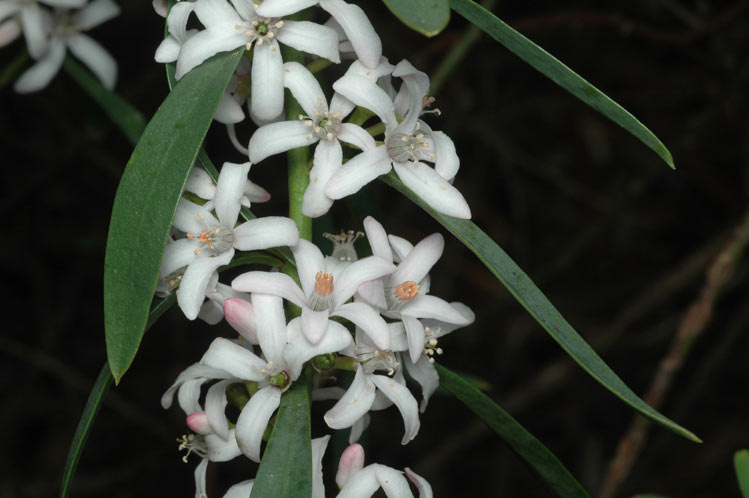
Philotheca conduplicata

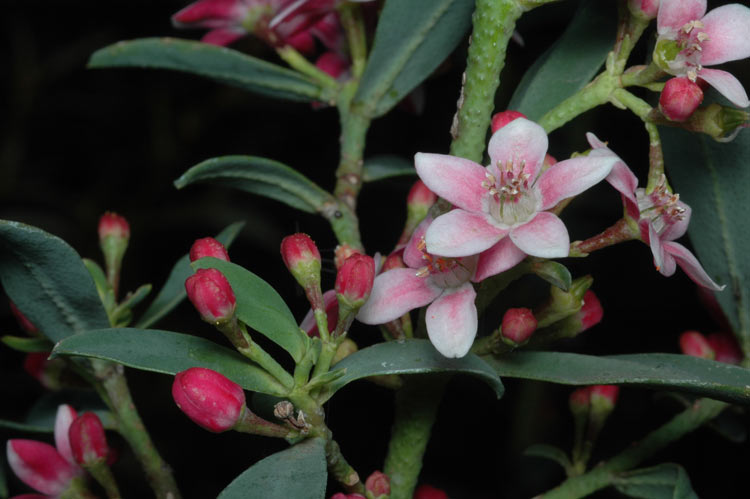
Philotheca myoporoides

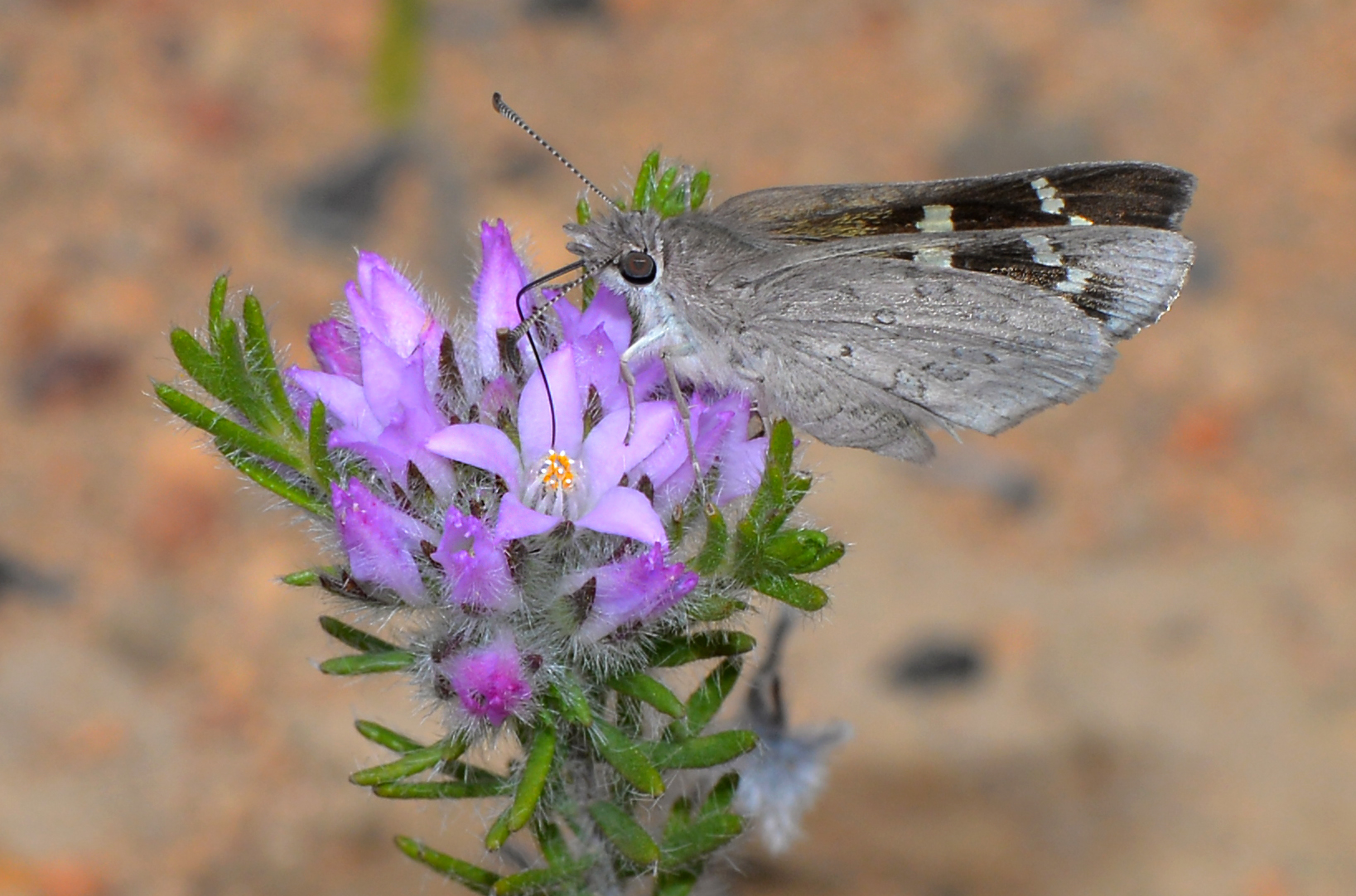
Philotheca nodiflora

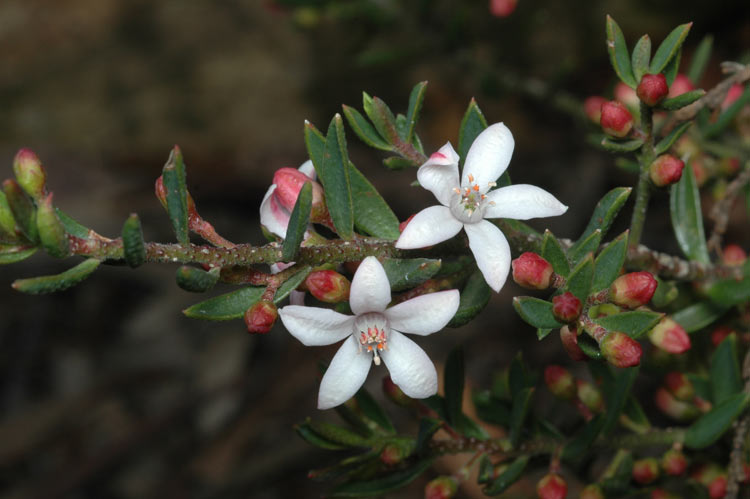
Philotheca scabra

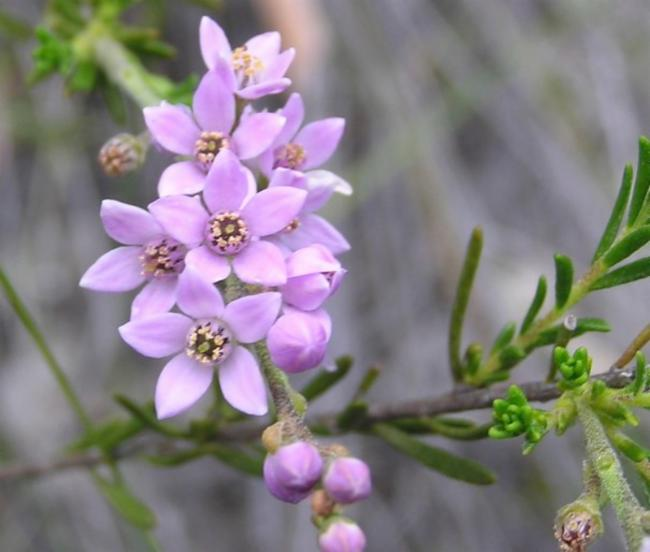
Philotheca spicata

Philotheca is a genus of about fifty species of flowering plants in the family Rutaceae. Plants in this genus are shrubs with simple leaves arranged alternately along the stems, flowers that usually have five sepals, five petals and ten stamens that curve inwards over the ovary. All species are endemic to Australia and there are species in every state, but not the Northern Territory.

== Description ==
Plants in the genus Philotheca are shrubs that are either glabrous or have tiny, simple hairs. The leaves are arranged alternately along the stems, narrow oblong to almost cylindrical and sessile or on a very short petiole. From a single to many flowers are arranged in leaf axils or on the ends of the branchlets. The flowers have five sepals and five petals (except in P. virgata which has four). The sepals are free from each other and the petals usually overlap at their bases. There are ten stamens that curve inwards over the ovary with anthers that have an appendage called the "apiculum". The ovary contains five carpels fused near their bases. The seeds are 2–5 mm (0.079–0.197 in) long and are released explosively from their capsule.

== Taxonomy and naming ==
The genus Philotheca was first formally described in 1816 by Edward Rudge from a specimen collected near Port Jackson and the description was published in Transactions of the Linnean Society of London. The first species Rudge described was P. australis but this name is considered a nomen illegitimum and a taxonomic synonym of Philotheca salsolifolia by the Australian Plant Census.

The name Philotheca should have been written Psilotheca after the Ancient Greek words psilos meaning "bare", "smooth", "bald" or "naked" and theke meaning "case", "container", "envelope" or "sheath", referring to "the smooth tube of the stamens".

Many plants formerly in Eriostemon are now in this genus.

== Distribution ==
Plants in the genus Philotheca are found in every state of Australia, but not in the Northern Territory.

== Species ==
The following is a list of Philotheca species accepted by the Australian Plant Census as at April 2019:

- Philotheca acrolopha Paul G.Wilson (Qld.)
- Philotheca angustifolia (Paul G. Wilson) Paul G. Wilson – narrow-leaf wax flower
  - Philotheca angustifolia (Paul G. Wilson) Paul G. Wilson subsp. angustifolia (Vic., S.A.)
  - Philotheca angustifolia subsp. montana (Paul G. Wilson) Paul G. Wilson (Vic.)
- Philotheca apiculata (Paul G. Wilson) Paul G. Wilson (W.A.)
- Philotheca basistyla Mollemans (W.A.)
- Philotheca brevifolia (A.Cunn. ex Endl.) Paul G. Wilson (N.S.W.)
- Philotheca brucei (F.Muell.) Paul G.Wilson (W.A.)
  - Philotheca brucei subsp. brevifolia (Paul G. Wilson) Paul G. Wilson
  - Philotheca brucei (F.Muell.) Paul G. Wilson subsp. brucei
  - Philotheca brucei subsp. cinerea (Paul G. Wilson) Paul G. Wilson
- Philotheca buxifolia (Sm.) Paul G.Wilson (N.S.W.)
  - Philotheca buxifolia (Sm.) Paul G. Wilson subsp. buxifolia – box-leaf wax flower
  - Philotheca buxifolia subsp. falcata Paul G. Wilson
  - Philotheca buxifolia subsp. obovata (G.Don) Paul G. Wilson
- Philotheca ciliata Hook. (Qld., N.S.W.)
- Philotheca citrina Paul G.Wilson (W.A.)
- Philotheca coateana Paul G. Wilson (W.A.)
- Philotheca coccinea (C.A.Gardner) Paul G.Wilson (W.A.)
- Philotheca conduplicata (Paul G. Wilson) P.I.Forst. (Qld., N.S.W.)
- Philotheca cuticularis Paul G. Wilson (Qld.)
- Philotheca cymbiformis (Paul G.Wilson) Paul G.Wilson (W.A.)
- Philotheca deserti (E. Pritzel) Paul G.Wilson (W.A.)
  - Philotheca deserti subsp. brevifolia Paul G.Wilson
  - Philotheca deserti (E.Pritz.) Paul G.Wilson subsp. deserti
- Philotheca difformis (A.Cunn. ex Endl.) Paul G.Wilson
  - Philotheca difformis (A.Cunn. ex Endl.) Paul G. Wilson subsp. difformis – small-leaf wax-flower (Qld., N.S.W., Vic., S.A.)
  - Philotheca difformis subsp. smithiana (Benth.) Paul G. Wilson (Qld., N.S.W.)
- Philotheca epilosa (Paul G. Wilson) P.I.Forst. (Qld., N.S.W.)
- Philotheca eremicola Paul G.Wilson (W.A.)
- Philotheca ericifolia (A.Cunn. ex Benth.) Paul G.Wilson (N.S.W.)
- Philotheca falcata (Paul G.Wilson) Paul G.Wilson (W.A.)
- Philotheca fitzgeraldii (C.R.P.Andrews) Paul G.Wilson (W.A.)
- Philotheca freyciana Rozefelds (Tas.)
- Philotheca gardneri (Paul G.Wilson) Paul G.Wilson (W.A.)
  - Philotheca gardneri (A.Cunn. ex Endl.) Paul G. Wilson subsp. gardneri
  - Philotheca gardneri subsp. globosa Paul G. Wilson
- Philotheca glabra (Paul G.Wilson) Paul G.Wilson (W.A.)
- Philotheca glasshousiensis (Domin) P.I.Forst. (Qld.)
- Philotheca hispidula (Sieber ex Spreng.) Paul G.Wilson (N.S.W.)
- Philotheca kalbarriensis Paul G.Wilson (W.A.)
- Philotheca langei Mollemans (W.A.)
- Philotheca linearis (A.Cunn. ex Endl.) Paul G.Wilson (W.A., S.A., N.S.W.)
- Philotheca myoporoides (DC.) M.J.Bayly
  - Philotheca myoporoides subsp. acuta (Blakely) Bayly (N.S.W.)
  - Philotheca myoporoides subsp. brevipedunculata Bayly (N.S.W.)
  - Philotheca myoporoides subsp. euroensis Bayly (Vic.)
  - Philotheca myoporoides (DC.) Bayly subsp. myoporoides (N.S.W., Vic.)
  - Philotheca myoporoides subsp. petraea Rozefelds (Vic.)
- Philotheca nodiflora (Lindl.) Paul G.Wilson (W.A.)
  - Philotheca nodiflora subsp. calycina (Turcz.) Paul G.Wilson
  - Philotheca nodiflora subsp. lasiocalyx (Domin) Paul G.Wilson
  - Philotheca nodiflora subsp. latericola Paul G.Wilson
  - Philotheca nodiflora (Lindl.) Paul G.Wilson subsp. nodiflora
- Philotheca nutans (Paul G.Wilson) Paul G.Wilson (W.A.)
- Philotheca obovalis (A.Cunn.) Paul G.Wilson (N.S.W.)
- Philotheca obovatifolia (Bayly) P.I.Forst. (Qld., N.S.W.)
- Philotheca pachyphylla (Paul G.Wilson) Paul G.Wilson (W.A.)
- Philotheca papillata I.Telford & L.M.Copel. (N.S.W.)
- Philotheca pinoides (Paul G.Wilson) Paul G.Wilson (W.A.)
- Philotheca pungens (Lindl.) Paul G.Wilson — prickly waxflower (Vic., S.A.)
- Philotheca queenslandica (C.T.White) P.I.Forst. (Qld.)
- Philotheca reichenbachii Sieber ex Spreng. (N.S.W.)
- Philotheca rhomboidea (Paul G.Wilson) Paul G.Wilson (W.A.)
- Philotheca salsolifolia (Sm.) Druce (N.S.W., A.C.T.)
  - Philotheca salsolifolia subsp. pedicellata Paul G.Wilson
  - Philotheca salsolifolia (Sm.) Druce subsp. salsolifolia
- Philotheca scabra (Paxton) Paul G.Wilson (N.S.W.)
  - Philotheca scabra subsp. latifolia (Paul G.Wilson) Paul G.Wilson
  - Philotheca scabra (Paxton) Paul G.Wilson subsp. scabra
- Philotheca sericea (Paul G.Wilson) Paul G.Wilson (W.A.)
- Philotheca spicata (A.Rich.) Paul G.Wilson (W.A.)
- Philotheca sporadica (M.J.Bayly) Paul G.Wilson (Qld.)
- Philotheca thryptomenoides (S.Moore) Paul G.Wilson (W.A.)
- Philotheca tomentella (Diels) Paul G.Wilson (W.A.)
- Philotheca trachyphylla (F.Muell.) Paul G.Wilson (N.S.W., Vic.)
- Philotheca tubiflora A.S.George (W.A.)
- Philotheca verrucosa (A.Rich.) Paul G.Wilson (Vic., S.A., Tas.)
- Philotheca virgata (Hook.f.) Paul G.Wilson (N.S.W., Vic., Tas.)
- Philotheca wonganensis (Paul G.Wilson) Paul G.Wilson (W.A.)
