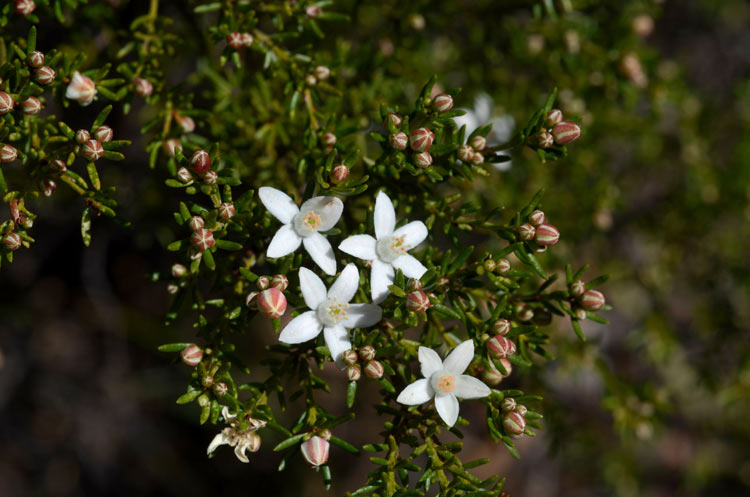
- In Carnarvon National Park

Scientific classification
- Kingdom: Plantae
- Clade: Tracheophytes
- Clade: Angiosperms
- Clade: Eudicots
- Clade: Rosids
- Order: Sapindales
- Family: Rutaceae
- Genus: Philotheca
- Species: P. ciliata

Binomial name
- Philotheca ciliata Hook.

= Philotheca ciliata =

Species of plant

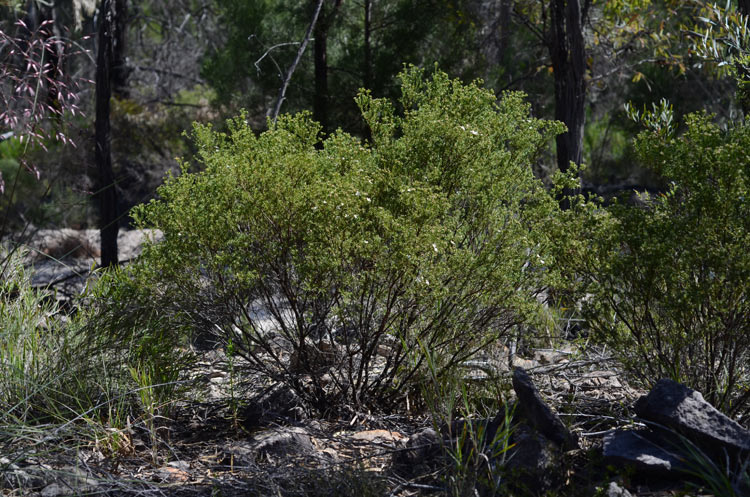
Habit in Carnarvon National Park, Queensland

Philotheca ciliata is a species of flowering plant in the family Rutaceae and is endemic to inland New South Wales and Queensland. It is a shrub with small, more or less cylindrical leaves and white flowers arranged singly or in two or threes on the ends of branchlets.

== Description ==
Philotheca ciliata is a shrub that grows to a height of about 2 m (6 ft 7 in). It has narrow elliptical to more or less cylindrical leaves 4–6 mm (0.16–0.24 in) long with more or less hairy edges. The flowers are borne singly or in twos or threes on the ends of the branchlets on a pedicel 1–2 mm (0.039–0.079 in) long. There are five broadly egg-shaped sepals about 1 mm (0.039 in) long and five narrow elliptical white petals about 5 mm (0.20 in) long. The ten stamens are joined in the lower part and hairy above. Flowering has been occurs from August to November and the fruit has tufts of hairs on the end.

== Taxonomy and naming ==
Philotheca ciliata was first formally described in 1848 by William Jackson Hooker in Thomas Mitchell's Journal of an Expedition into the Interior of Tropical Australia.

== Distribution and habitat ==
This philotheca grows in woodland and mallee and is found in inland south-east Queensland and in New South Wales near West Wyalong and the northern Pilliga Scrub.

== Conservation status ==
This species is classified as of "least concern" under the Queensland Government Nature Conservation Act 1992.
