= Philotheca acrolopha =

Scientific classification
- Kingdom: Plantae
- Clade: Tracheophytes
- Clade: Angiosperms
- Clade: Eudicots
- Clade: Rosids
- Order: Sapindales
- Family: Rutaceae
- Genus: Philotheca
- Species: P. acrolopha

Binomial name
- Philotheca acrolopha Paul G.Wilson

Species of plant

Philotheca acrolopha is a species of flowering plant in the family Rutaceae and is only known from a small area in Queensland. It is a shrub with crowded, wedge-shaped leaves and cream-coloured to pale pink flowers.

== Description ==
Philotheca acrolopha is a shrub that grows to a height of about 1 m (3 ft 3 in) with reddish branchlets. The leaves are crowded near the ends of the branchlets, wedge-shaped to heart-shaped with the narrower end towards the base, 7–13 mm (0.28–0.51 in) long and 3–6 mm (0.12–0.24 in) wide on a short petiole. The flowers are borne singly on the ends of the branchlets on a pedicel about 2.5 mm (0.098 in) long. There are five more or less round sepals about 1.5 mm (0.059 in) long and five narrow egg-shaped, cream-coloured to pale pink petals about 5 mm (0.20 in) long. There are ten stamens that are fused at the base, and to the petals. Flowering has been observed in July.

== Taxonomy and naming ==
Philotheca acrolopha was first formally described in 1998 by Paul Wilson in the journal Nuytsia. The type specimen was collected on Mount Tozer in the Iron Range National Park.

== Distribution and habitat ==
This philotheca grows in heath on a granite hill and is only known from the type location.

== Conservation status ==
This species is classified as "vulnerable" under the Queensland Government Nature Conservation Act 1992. It was previously listed as "vulnerable" under the Australian Government Environment Protection and Biodiversity Conservation Act 1999 but was removed from that list in December 2010.
