= Philotheca apiculata =

Conservation status
- Priority One — Poorly Known Taxa (DEC)

Scientific classification
- Kingdom: Plantae
- Clade: Embryophytes
- Clade: Tracheophytes
- Clade: Spermatophytes
- Clade: Angiosperms
- Clade: Eudicots
- Clade: Rosids
- Order: Sapindales
- Family: Rutaceae
- Genus: Philotheca
- Species: P. apiculata

Binomial name
- Philotheca apiculata (Paul G.Wilson) Paul G.Wilson

Synonyms
- Eriostemon apiculatus Paul G.Wilson

Species of plant

Philotheca apiculata is a species of flowering plant in the family Rutaceae and is endemic to the south-west of Western Australia. It is a small shrub with narrow club-shaped leaves and small clusters of white to pink flowers on the ends of branchlets.

== Description ==
Philotheca apiculata is a shrub that grows to a height of 1 m (3 ft 3 in) with stems that develop a wax-like substance. The leaves are narrow club-shaped, 4–8 mm (0.16–0.31 in) long with warty glands and ending with a black point. The flowers are borne singly or in groups of up to two to four on the ends of the branchlets, each flower on a pedicel 0.5–1.5 mm (0.020–0.059 in) long. There are five triangular sepals about 2 mm (0.079 in) long and five oblong white to pink petals about 6 mm (0.24 in) long. There are ten stamens each that are free from each other and reddish near the tip. Flowering occurs from July to September and the fruit is 1.5–2 mm (0.059–0.079 in) long and beaked.

== Taxonomy and naming ==
This philotheca was first formally described in 1970 by Paul Wilson who gave it the name Eriostemon apiculatus and published the description in the journal Nuytsia from specimens collected near Norseman. In 1998, Wilson changed the name to Philotheca apiculata in the same journal.

== Distribution and habitat ==
Philotheca apiculata grows on ultramafic rock near Holleton and Norseman in Western Australia.

== Conservation status ==
This species is classified as "Priority One" by the Government of Western Australia Department of Parks and Wildlife, meaning that it is known from only one or a few locations which are potentially at risk.
