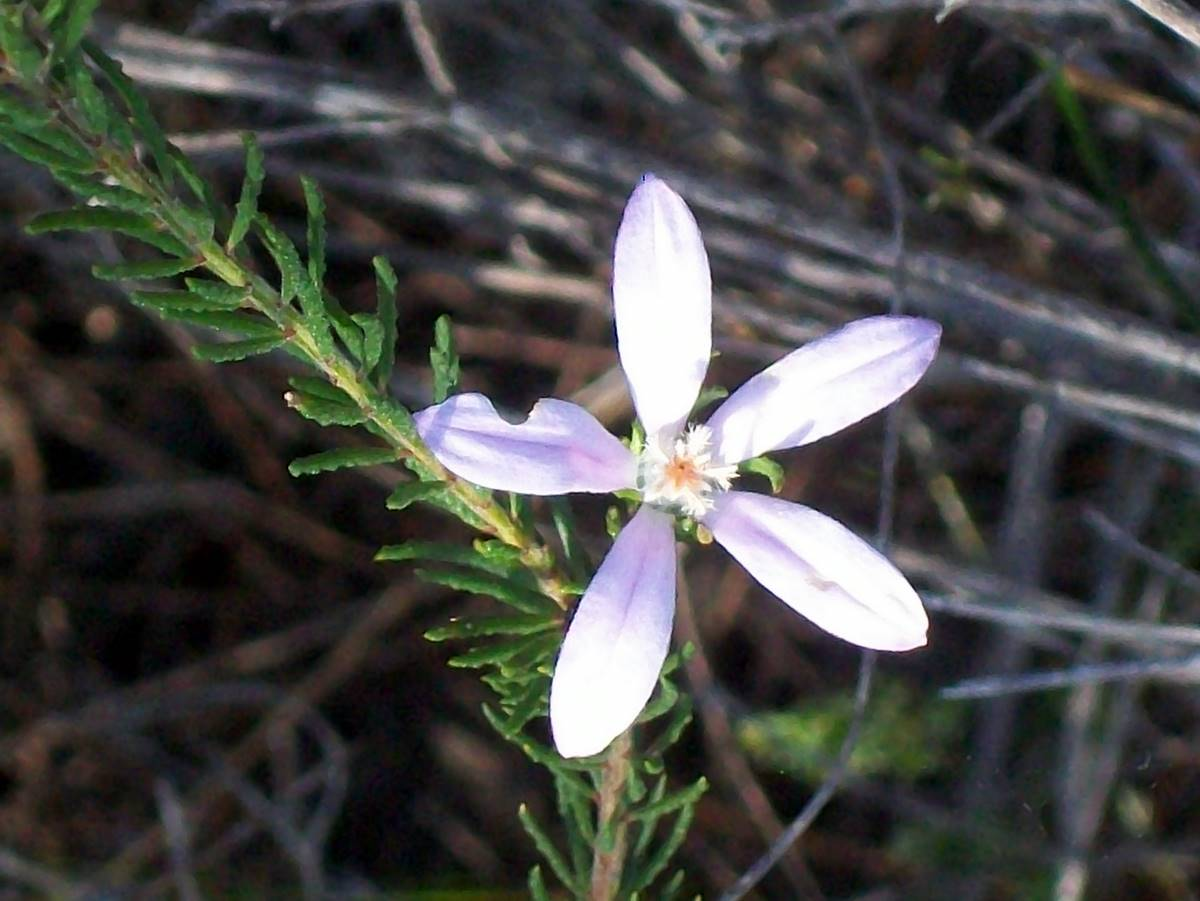
- Ku-ring-gai Chase National Park, Australia

Scientific classification
- Kingdom: Plantae
- Clade: Embryophytes
- Clade: Tracheophytes
- Clade: Spermatophytes
- Clade: Angiosperms
- Clade: Eudicots
- Clade: Rosids
- Order: Sapindales
- Family: Rutaceae
- Genus: Philotheca
- Species: P. reichenbachii

Binomial name
- Philotheca reichenbachii Sieber ex Spreng.

Synonyms
- Philotheca australis var. reichenbachiana Maiden & Betche orth. var.; Philotheca australis var. reichenbachii (Sieber ex Spreng.) Maiden & Betche; Philotheca longifolia Turcz.; Philotheca reichenbachiana Rchb. orth. var.; Philotheca reicheubachiana Rchb. orth. var.

= Philotheca reichenbachii =

Species of shrub

Philotheca reichenbachii is a species of flowering plant in the family Rutaceae and is endemic to New South Wales. It is a shrub with upright branchlets, crowded, linear or cylindrical leaves and pink to purple flowers arranged singly or in twos or threes on the ends of branchlets.

== Description ==
Philotheca reichenbachii is a shrub that typically grows to a height of 1 m (3 ft 3 in) and has upright branchlets covered with stiff hairs. The leaves are crowded near the ends of branchlets, linear or more or less cylindrical, glandular-warty, 10–20 mm (0.39–0.79 in) long and 1–1.5 mm (0.039–0.059 in) wide. The flowers are arranged singly or in twos or threes on the ends of branchlets and have broadly triangular sepals 1–1.5 mm (0.039–0.059 in) long. The petals are pink to purple, lance-shaped, 10–15 mm (0.39–0.59 in) long and the stamens are densely hairy and joined along their lower half. Flowering occurs from August to December and the fruit is oblong, 5–6 mm (0.20–0.24 in) long.

== Taxonomy ==
Philotheca reichenbachii was first formally described in 1827 by Sprengel from an unpublished description by Franz Sieber and the description was published in the 17th edition of Systema Vegetabilium.

== Distribution and habitat ==
This philotheca grows in heath in rocky or sandy sites in the Sydney region.
