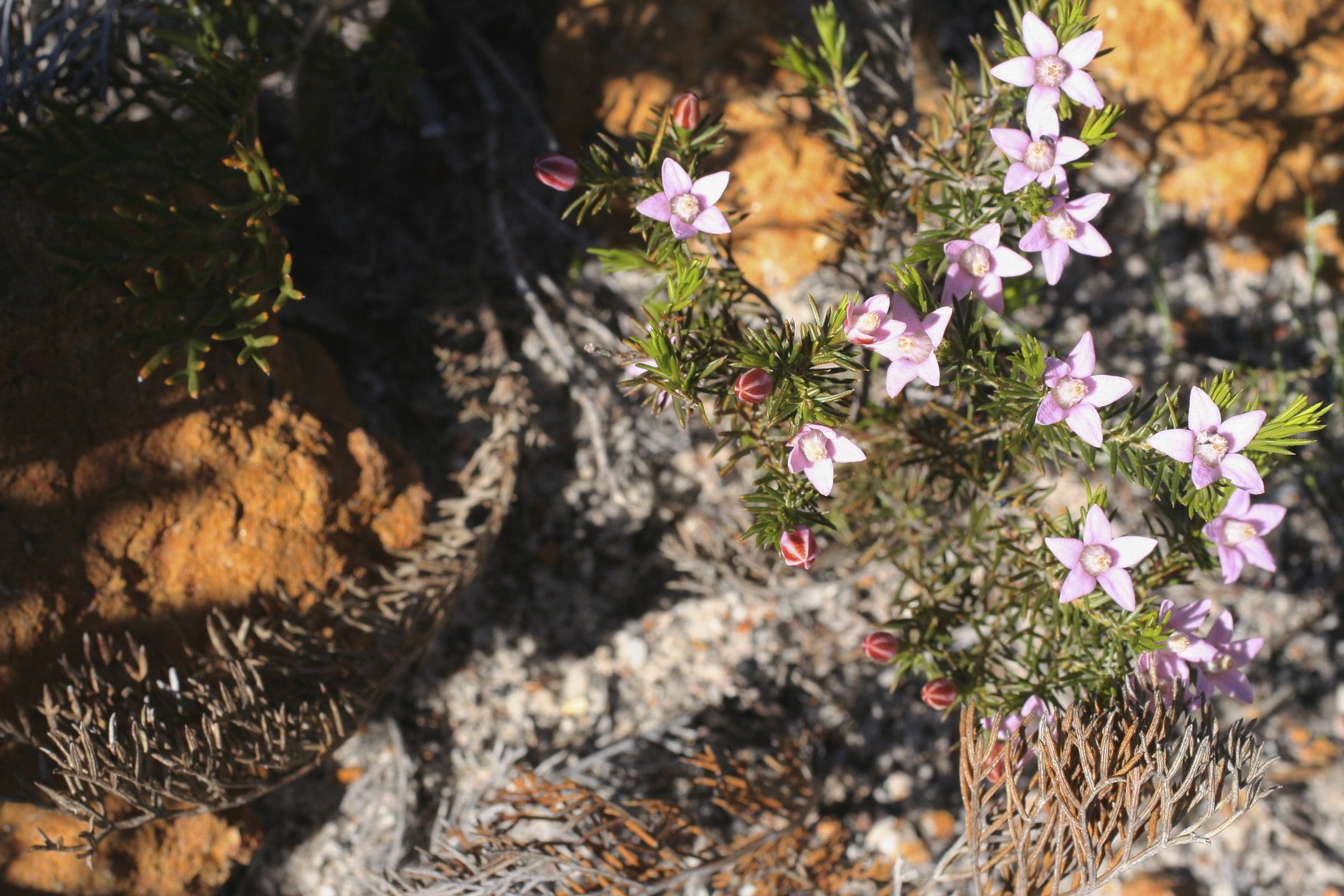

Scientific classification
- Kingdom: Plantae
- Clade: Tracheophytes
- Clade: Angiosperms
- Clade: Eudicots
- Clade: Rosids
- Order: Sapindales
- Family: Rutaceae
- Genus: Philotheca
- Species: P. pinoides

Binomial name
- Philotheca pinoides (Paul G.Wilson) Paul G.Wilson

Synonyms
- Eriostemon pinoides Paul G.Wilson

= Philotheca pinoides =

Species of plant

Philotheca pinoides is a species of flowering plant in the family Rutaceae and is endemic to the south-west of Western Australia. It is a small, erect undershrub with needle-shaped, glandular-warty leaves and pale pink or red flowers arranged singly or in groups of up to three in the axil of leaves at the end of branchlets.

== Description ==
Philotheca pinoides is an erect undershrub that grows to a height of 30–60 cm (12–24 in) with glandular-warty branchlets. The leaves are needle-shaped, about 10 mm (0.39 in) long and channelled on the upper surface. The flowers are arranged singly or in groups of up to three in a leaf axil on the end of branchlets, each flower on a pedicel 4–7 mm (0.16–0.28 in) long. There are five broadly triangular sepals about 1.5 mm (0.059 in) long and five pale pink or red petals about 6 mm (0.24 in). The ten stamens are sparsely hairy. Flowering occurs from August to October and the fruit is about 6 mm (0.24 in) long.

== Taxonomy and naming ==
This philotheca was first formally described in 1970 by Paul Wilson who gave it the name Eriostemon pinoides and published the description in the journal Nuytsia from specimens collected by Charles Gardner on the summit of Mount Peron in 1949. In 1998, Wilson changed the name to Philotheca pinoides in the same journal.

== Distribution and habitat ==
Philotheca pinoides grows in heathland between Eneabba and Badgingarra in the south-west of Western Australia.

== Conservation status ==
Philotheca pinoides is classified as "not threatened" by the Government of Western Australia Department of Parks and Wildlife.
