= Philotheca tubiflora =

Conservation status
- Priority One — Poorly Known Taxa (DEC)

Scientific classification
- Kingdom: Plantae
- Clade: Tracheophytes
- Clade: Angiosperms
- Clade: Eudicots
- Clade: Rosids
- Order: Sapindales
- Family: Rutaceae
- Genus: Philotheca
- Species: P. tubiflora

Binomial name
- Philotheca tubiflora A.S.George

Species of flowering plant

Philotheca tubiflora is a species of flowering plant in the family Rutaceae and is endemic to Western Australia. It is a compact, much-branched with more or less cylindrical leaves and white to pale pink flowers arranged singly on the ends of branchlets. It is only known from the western edge of the Great Victoria Desert.

== Description ==
Philotheca tubiflora is a compact, much-branched shrub that typically grows to a height of 20–60 cm (7.9–23.6 in) and has branchlets that become grey to black with age. The leaves are thick, more or less cylindrical, about 3 mm (0.12 in) long with a small black point on the tip. The flowers are arranged singly on the ends of branchlets on a pedicel 1–2 mm (0.039–0.079 in) long. The five sepals are egg-shaped, 1.5 mm (0.059 in) long, and the five petals are narrowly elliptic, white to pale pink and about 10 mm (0.39 in) long. The ten stamens are joined to the petal tube and densely hairy above. Flowering occurs from June to September and the fruit is about 3 mm (0.12 in) long with a small beak.

== Taxonomy ==
Philotheca tubiflora was first described in 1971 by Alex George in the journal Nuytsia from specimens he collected near Laverton, where it was growing on a "rocky hill with Callitris huegelii". At the time, it was the first record of a Philotheca in Western Australia.

== Distribution and habitat ==
This philotheca grows on rocky outcrops near Laverton on the western edge of the Great Victoria Desert in Western Australia.

== Conservation status ==
Philotheca tubiflora is classified as "Priority One" by the Government of Western Australia Department of Parks and Wildlife, meaning that it is known from only one or a few locations which are potentially at risk.
