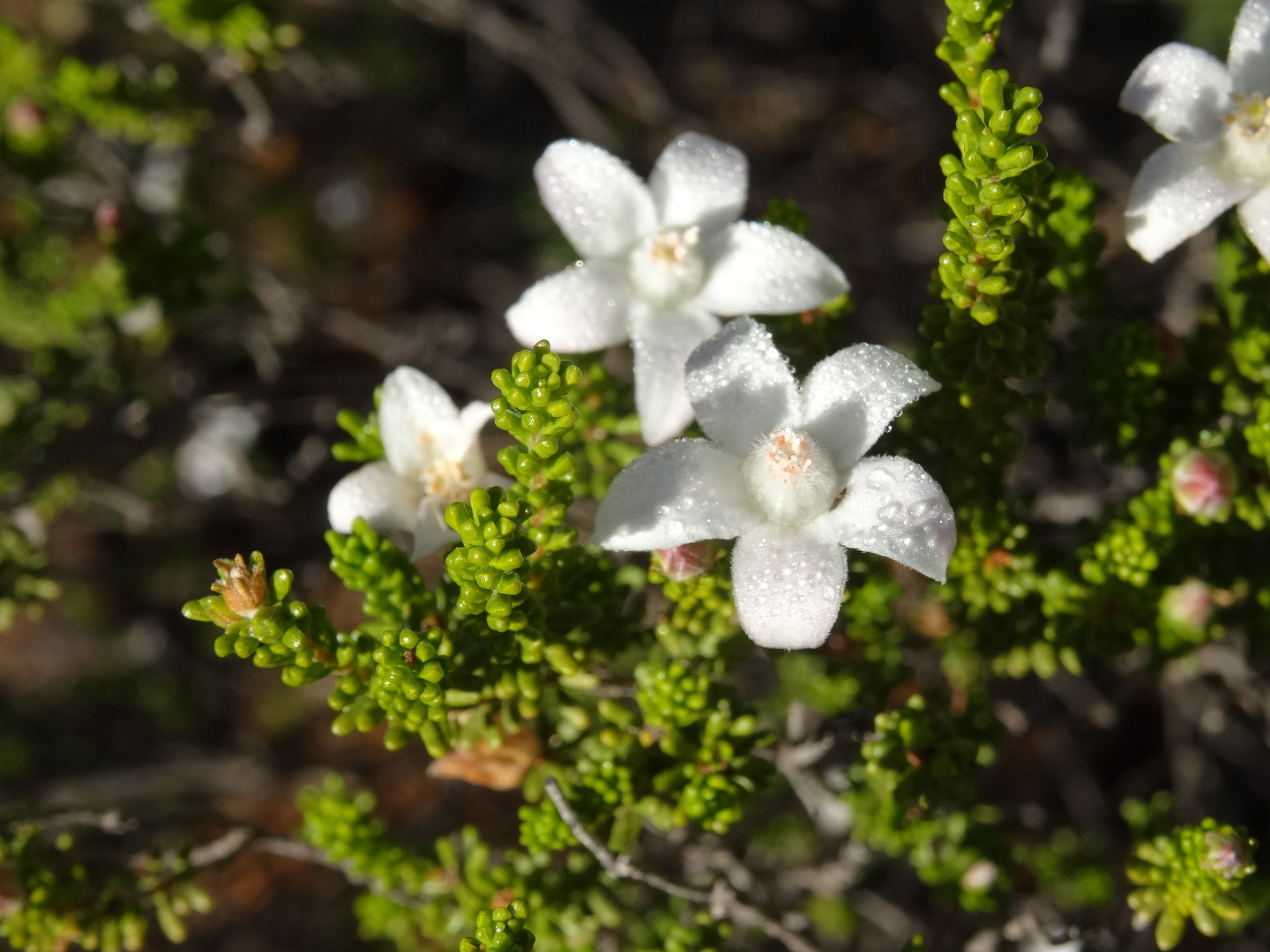
- Philotheca sericea near Paynes Find

Scientific classification
- Kingdom: Plantae
- Clade: Tracheophytes
- Clade: Angiosperms
- Clade: Eudicots
- Clade: Rosids
- Order: Sapindales
- Family: Rutaceae
- Genus: Philotheca
- Species: P. sericea

Binomial name
- Philotheca sericea (Paul G.Wilson) Paul G.Wilson

Synonyms
- Eriostemon sericeus Paul G.Wilson

= Philotheca sericea =

Species of plant

Philotheca sericea is a species of flowering plant in the family Rutaceae and is endemic to the south-west of Western Australia. It is an undershrub with small oval to elliptical leaves and white to pink flowers usually arranged singly at the end of branchlets.

== Description ==
Philotheca sericea is a shrub that typically grows to a height of 1.5 m (4 ft 11 in) with moderately hairy branchlets. The leaves are fleshy, oval to elliptical, 1.5–3 mm (0.059–0.118 in), flat on the top and rounded on the lower side. The flowers are usually arranged singly at the end of branchlets, each flower on a pedicel about 0.5 mm (0.020 in) long. There are five triangular to round sepals about 2.5 mm (0.098 in) long and five white to pink, egg-shaped petals about 10 mm (0.39 in) long and densely covered with soft hairs. The ten stamens are joined at the base and hairy. Flowering occurs from July to September and the fruit is about 4 mm (0.16 in) long with a stout beak about 2 mm (0.079 in) long.

== Taxonomy and naming ==
This philotheca was first formally described in 1970 by Paul Wilson who gave it the name Eriostemon sericeus and published the description in the journal Nuytsia from specimens collected by Nathaniel Speck near Kalli in 1964. In 1998, Wilson changed the name to Philotheca sericea in the same journal.

== Distribution and habitat ==
Philotheca sericea grows in shrubland, often near granite or laterite, from near Geraldton to near Sandstone in the south-west of Western Australia.

== Conservation status ==
This philotheca is classified as "not threatened" by the Government of Western Australia Department of Parks and Wildlife.
