= Philotheca langei =

Conservation status
- Priority One — Poorly Known Taxa (DEC)

Scientific classification
- Kingdom: Plantae
- Clade: Embryophytes
- Clade: Tracheophytes
- Clade: Spermatophytes
- Clade: Angiosperms
- Clade: Eudicots
- Clade: Rosids
- Order: Sapindales
- Family: Rutaceae
- Genus: Philotheca
- Species: P. langei

Binomial name
- Philotheca langei Mollemans

Species of plant

Philotheca langei is a species of flowering plant in the family Rutaceae and is endemic to a restricted area of the south-west of Western Australia. It is a small shrub with club-shaped, glandular-warty leaves and white flowers arranged singly or in twos or threes on the ends of branchlets.

== Description ==
Philotheca langei is a shrub that grows to a height of 1 m (3 ft 3 in) with glandular-warty branchlets. The leaves are narrow to broadly club-shaped, glandular-warty, 4–6 mm (0.16–0.24 in) long and channelled on the upper surface. The flowers are borne singly or in twos or threes on the ends of the branchlets, each flower on a pedicel about 3 mm (0.12 in) long. There are five broadly egg-shaped, fleshy sepals about 1 mm (0.039 in) long and five elliptical white petals about 4 mm (0.16 in) long with a central pink stripe. The ten stamens are free from each other and have a prominent white appendage on the anthers. Flowering occurs in August and the fruit is about 3 mm (0.12 in) long and beaked.

== Taxonomy and naming ==
Philotheca langei was first formally described in 1993 by Frans Hendricus Mollemans in the journal Nuytsia from specimens he collected in the Chiddarcooping Hill Nature Reserve. The specific epithet (langei) honours the botanist Robert T. Lange.

== Distribution and habitat ==
This philotheca grows in yellow sand near granite near Chiddarcooping Hill with one collection from near Merredin.

== Conservation status ==
This philotheca is classified as "Priority One" by the Government of Western Australia Department of Parks and Wildlife, meaning that it is known from only one or a few locations which are potentially at risk.
