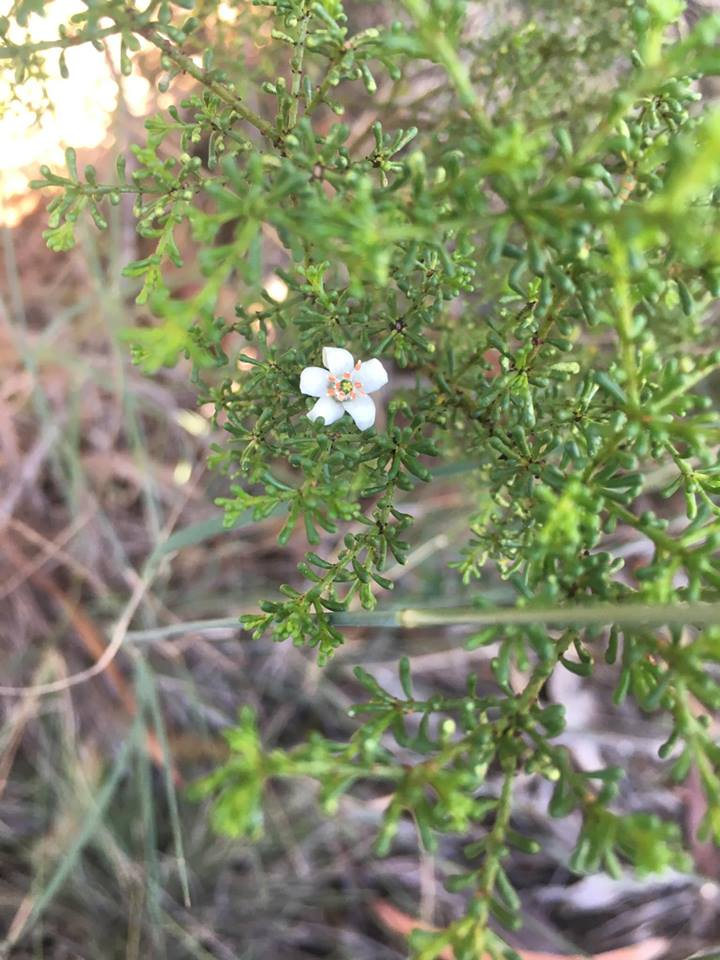

Conservation status
- Vulnerable (EPBC Act)

Scientific classification
- Kingdom: Plantae
- Clade: Tracheophytes
- Clade: Angiosperms
- Clade: Eudicots
- Clade: Rosids
- Order: Sapindales
- Family: Rutaceae
- Genus: Philotheca
- Species: P. sporadica

Binomial name
- Philotheca sporadica (Bayly) Paul G.Wilson

Synonyms
- Eriostemon sporadicus Bayly

= Philotheca sporadica =

Kogan waxflower

Species of plant

Philotheca sporadica, commonly known as Kogan waxflower, is a species of flowering plant in the family Rutaceae and is endemic to south-eastern Queensland. It is a shrub with small, narrow oval leaves with the narrower end toward the base and white flowers with a pink midrib, usually arranged singly on the ends of branchlets.

== Description ==
Philotheca sporadica is a shrub that grows to a height of about 1 m (3 ft 3 in) and has sparsely glandular-warty branchlets. The leaves are more or less sessile, narrow oval with the narrower end towards the base and 2–3 mm (0.079–0.118 in) long. The flowers are usually arranged singly on the ends of branchlets on a pedicel 0.5–1 mm (0.020–0.039 in) long. There are five broadly triangular sepals and five elliptic white petals about 6 mm (0.24 in) long with a pink midrib. The ten stamens are free from each other and hairy. Flowering occurs from August to November.

== Taxonomy and naming ==
This philotheca was first formally described in 1942 by Michael J. Bayly who gave it the name Eriostemon sporadicus and published the description in the journal Australian Systematic Botany. In 1998, Paul Wilson changed the name to Philotheca sporadica in the journal Nuytsia.

== Distribution and habitat ==
Philotheca sporadica grows in woodland and shrubland on shallow soil from near Kogan to Tara in the Darling Downs region of Queensland.

== Conservation status ==
Philotheca sporadica is classified as "vulnerable" under the Australian Government Environment Protection and Biodiversity Conservation Act 1999 and as of "least concern" under the Queensland Government Nature Conservation Act 1992, but consideration is being given to delisting the species from the EPBC Act.
