= Philotheca basistyla =

White-flowered philotheca

Conservation status
- Endangered (EPBC Act)

Scientific classification
- Kingdom: Plantae
- Clade: Embryophytes
- Clade: Tracheophytes
- Clade: Spermatophytes
- Clade: Angiosperms
- Clade: Eudicots
- Clade: Rosids
- Order: Sapindales
- Family: Rutaceae
- Genus: Philotheca
- Species: P. basistyla

Binomial name
- Philotheca basistyla Mollemans

Species of plant

Philotheca basistyla, commonly known as the white-flowered philotheca, is a species of flowering plant in the family Rutaceae and is endemic to the south-west of Western Australia. It is a small shrub with narrow club-shaped leaves and white flowers arranged singly on the ends of branchlets.

== Description ==
Philotheca basistyla is a shrub that grows to a height of 1 m (3 ft 3 in) with corky branchlets. The leaves are narrow club-shaped, about 10 mm (0.39 in) long with scattered warty glands. The flowers are borne singly on the ends of the branchlets, each flower on a narrow top-shaped pedicel about 1 mm (0.039 in) long. There are five broadly egg-shaped sepals about 1 mm (0.039 in) long and five elliptical white petals about 6 mm (0.24 in) long. The ten stamens are joined for two-thirds of their length to form a cylindrical tube. Flowering occurs from August to October.

== Taxonomy and naming ==
Philotheca basistyla was first formally described in 1993 by Frans Hendricus Mollemans in the journal Nuytsia from specimens collected near Trayning.

== Distribution and habitat ==
White-flowered philotheca grows in dense scrub north-west of Southern Cross in the south-west of Western Australia.

== Conservation status ==
This philotheca is listed as "endangered" under the Australian Government Environment Protection and Biodiversity Conservation Act 1999 and an interim recovery plan has been prepared. It is also listed as "Threatened Flora (Declared Rare Flora — Extant)" by the Department of Environment and Conservation (Western Australia). The main threats to the species include road and firebreak maintenance activities, pipeline management, weed invasion and grazing by rabbits.
