= Philotheca brevifolia =

Scientific classification
- Kingdom: Plantae
- Clade: Tracheophytes
- Clade: Angiosperms
- Clade: Eudicots
- Clade: Rosids
- Order: Sapindales
- Family: Rutaceae
- Genus: Philotheca
- Species: P. brevifolia

Binomial name
- Philotheca brevifolia (Cunn. ex. Endl.) Paul G.Wilson

Synonyms
- Eriostemon brevifolius A.Cunn. ex Endl.; Eriostemon difformis var. teretifolius Benth.

Species of plant

Philotheca brevifolia is a species of flowering plant in the family Rutaceae and is endemic to a small area in south-western New South Wales. It is a spreading shrub with fleshy, sessile, cylindrical leaves and white to pink flowers arranged singly or in small groups on the ends of branchlets.

== Description ==
Philotheca brevifolia is a spreading shrub that grows to a height of 2 m (6 ft 7 in) with warty glands on the branchlets. The leaves are more or less cylindrical, channelled on the lower surface, sessile and 2–4 mm (0.079–0.157 in) long with warty glands. The flowers are borne singly or in groups of two to four on the ends of the branchlets, each flower on a pedicel 1–3 mm (0.039–0.118 in) long. There are five round sepals about 1 mm (0.039 in) long and five elliptical white to pink petals about 5 mm (0.20 in) long. The ten stamens are free from each other with a prominent appendage on the anther. Flowering occurs in spring and the fruit is 3 mm (0.12 in) long and beaked.

== Taxonomy ==
This philotheca was first formally described in 1837 by Stephan Endlicher from an unpublished description by Allan Cunningham who gave it the name Eriostemon brevifolius. Endlicher published the description in the Enumeratio plantarum quas in Novae Hollandiae ora austro-occidentali ad fluvium Cygnorum et in sinu Regis Georgii collegit Carolus Liber Baro de Hügel. The type specimens were collected by Cunningham on "barren ground at the base of Peel's Range, interior of N.S.W." in June 1817. In 1998, Wilson changed the name to Philotheca brevifolia in the journal Nuysia.

== Distribution and habitat ==
Philotheca brevifolia usually grows in mallee and is only known in a restricted area near Griffith in New South Wales.
