= Philotheca cuticularis =

Scientific classification
- Kingdom: Plantae
- Clade: Tracheophytes
- Clade: Angiosperms
- Clade: Eudicots
- Clade: Rosids
- Order: Sapindales
- Family: Rutaceae
- Genus: Philotheca
- Species: P. cuticularis

Binomial name
- Philotheca cuticularis Paul G.Wilson

Species of plant

Philotheca cuticularis is a species of flowering plant in the family Rutaceae and is endemic to Queensland. It is a rounded shrub with small, crowded leaves and small white flowers arranged singly on the ends of branchlets.

== Description ==
Philotheca cuticularis is a rounded shrub that grows to a height of 0.6 m (2 ft 0 in) and has glandular-warty branchlets. The leaves are crowded, more or less cylindrical, glandular-warty and 1.5–2 mm (0.059–0.079 in) long. The flowers are borne singly on the ends of the branchlets on a pedicel 0.5–1 mm (0.020–0.039 in) long. There are five sepals 1–2 mm (0.039–0.079 in) long and five elliptical, white petals about 2.5 mm (0.098 in) long. The ten stamens are free from each other and hairy.

== Taxonomy and naming ==
Philotheca cuticularis was first formally described in 1998 by Paul Wilson in the journal Nuytsia from specimens collected by the Rosemary Purdie in the Grey-Gowan Ranges in 1984.

== Distribution ==
This species of philotheca grows in shallow soil in the Gowan Range of southern Queensland.

== Conservation status ==
This species is classified as of "least concern" under the Queensland Government Nature Conservation Act 1992.
