= Philotheca falcata =

Sickle-leaved waxflower

Conservation status
- Critically endangered (EPBC Act)

Scientific classification
- Kingdom: Plantae
- Clade: Tracheophytes
- Clade: Angiosperms
- Clade: Eudicots
- Clade: Rosids
- Order: Sapindales
- Family: Rutaceae
- Genus: Philotheca
- Species: P. falcata

Binomial name
- Philotheca falcata (Paul G.Wilson) Paul G.Wilson

Synonyms
- Eriostemon falcatus Paul G.Wilson

Species of plant

Philotheca falcata, commonly known as the sickle-leaved waxflower, is a species of flowering plant in the family Rutaceae and is endemic to a small area in the south-west of Western Australia. It is a small, densely branched shrub with narrow club-shaped leaves and single flowers on the ends of branchlets.

== Description ==
Philotheca falcata is a densely-branched shrub that grows to a height of 15–25 cm (5.9–9.8 in) with densely glandular-warty branchlets. The leaves are narrow club-shaped and curved, about 6 mm (0.24 in) long with warty glands. The flowers are borne singly on the ends of the branchlets, each flower on a pedicel about 2 mm (0.079 in) long. There are five triangular sepals about 3 mm (0.12 in) long and five elliptic white petals about 7 mm (0.28 in) long. The ten hairy stamens are free from each other and the style is glabrous. Flowering has been recorded in October.

== Taxonomy and naming ==
This philotheca was first formally described in 1970 by Paul Wilson who gave it the name Eriostemon falcatus and published the description in the journal Nuytsia from specimens collected by William Blackall near Yellowdine in 1931. In 1998, Wilson changed the name to Philotheca falcata in the same journal.

== Distribution and habitat ==
The only known specimens of Philotheca falcata were growing in woodland near Southern Cross and near Holleton.

== Conservation status ==
This species is classified as "critically endangered" under the Australian Government Environment Protection and Biodiversity Conservation Act 1999 and as Threatened Flora (Declared Rare Flora — Extant)" by the Department of Environment and Conservation (Western Australia). The main threat to the species is habitat alteration caused by land clearing.
