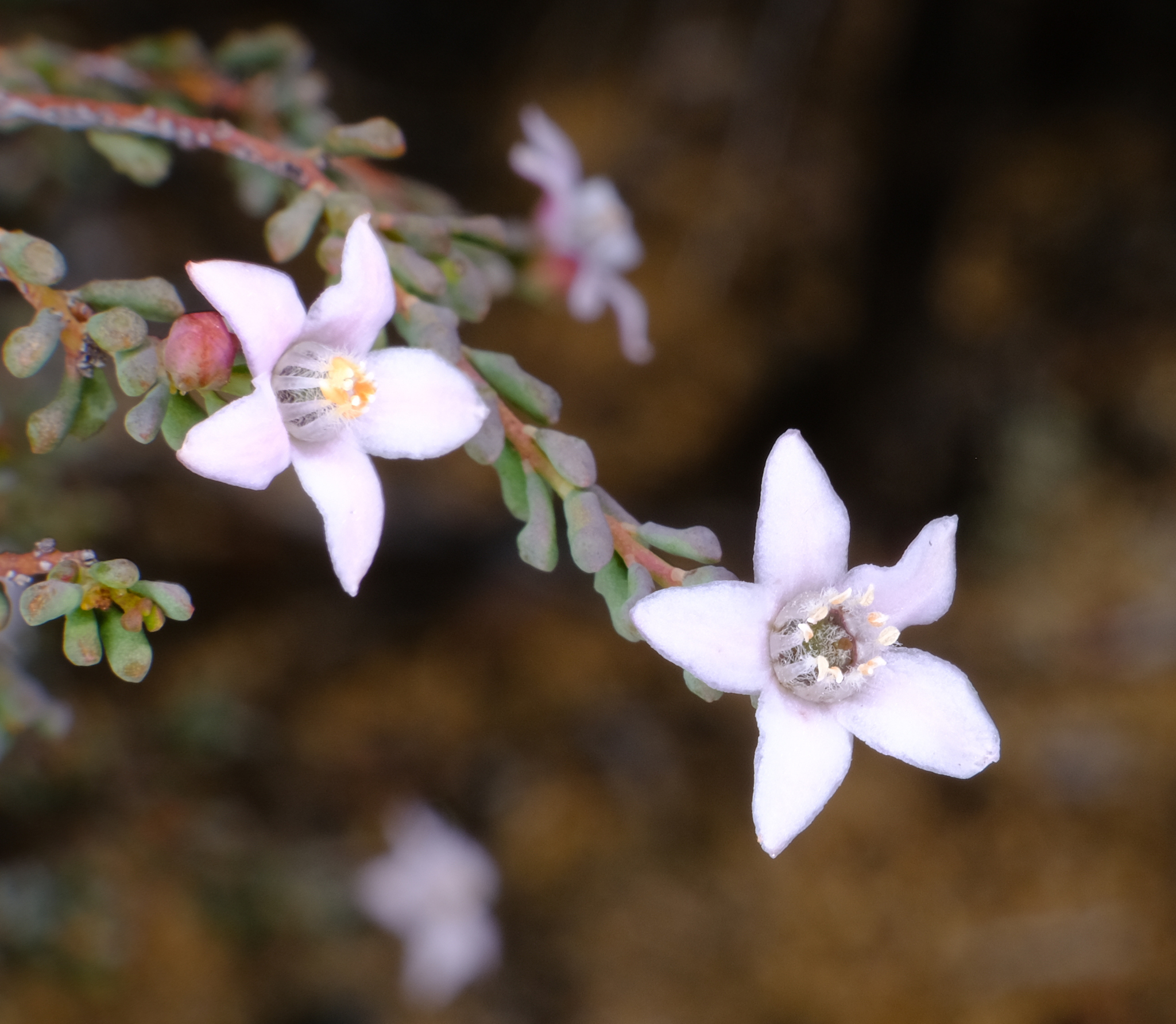

Scientific classification
- Kingdom: Plantae
- Clade: Embryophytes
- Clade: Tracheophytes
- Clade: Spermatophytes
- Clade: Angiosperms
- Clade: Eudicots
- Clade: Rosids
- Order: Sapindales
- Family: Rutaceae
- Genus: Philotheca
- Species: P. rhomboidea

Binomial name
- Philotheca rhomboidea (Paul G.Wilson) Paul G.Wilson

Synonyms
- Eriostemon rhomboideus Paul G.Wilson

= Philotheca rhomboidea =

Species of plant

Philotheca rhomboidea is a species of flowering plant in the family Rutaceae and is endemic to the south-west of Western Australia. It is a small undershrub with thick, broadly elliptic to round leaves and white to pale pink flowers arranged singly or in twos or threes at the end of branchlets.

== Description ==
Philotheca rhomboidea is an undershrub that typically grows to a height of 1 m (3 ft 3 in) with glabrous, sparsely glandular-warty branchlets that become corky with age. The leaves are thick, broadly elliptic to egg-shaped or round, 2–4 mm (0.079–0.157 in) long with two or three glandular warts on the lower surface. The flowers are arranged singly or in twos or threes on the end of branchlets, each flower on a pedicel 2–3 mm (0.079–0.118 in) long. There are five triangular sepals 1–1.5 mm (0.039–0.059 in) long and five white to pale pink petals about 5 mm (0.20 in) long with a prominent midrib. The ten stamens are free from each other and hairy. Flowering occurs from August to October and the fruit is about 2.5 mm (0.098 in) long.

== Taxonomy and naming ==
This philotheca was first formally described in 1970 by Paul Wilson who gave it the name Eriostemon rhomboideus and published the description in the journal Nuytsia from specimens he collected near Lake King in 1964. In 1998, Wilson changed the name to Philotheca rhomboidea in the same journal.

== Distribution and habitat ==
Philotheca rhomboidea grows in shrubland, often near granite or laterite, between Wongan Hills and near Esperance in the south-west of Western Australia.

== Conservation status ==
This philotheca is classified as "not threatened" by the Government of Western Australia Department of Parks and Wildlife.
