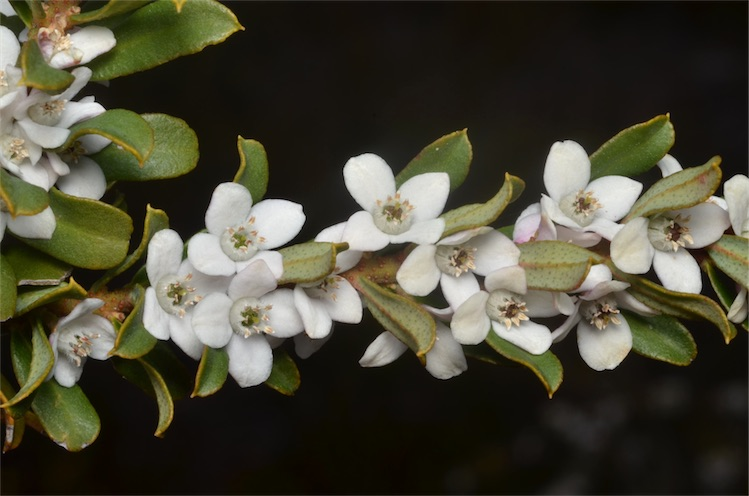
- Near Coles Bay, Tasmania

Scientific classification
- Kingdom: Plantae
- Clade: Embryophytes
- Clade: Tracheophytes
- Clade: Spermatophytes
- Clade: Angiosperms
- Clade: Eudicots
- Clade: Rosids
- Order: Sapindales
- Family: Rutaceae
- Genus: Philotheca
- Species: P. virgata

Binomial name
- Philotheca virgata (Hook.f.) Paul G.Wilson

Synonyms
- Eriostemon virgatus A.Cunn. ex Hook

= Philotheca virgata =

Tasmanian wax-flower

Species of plant

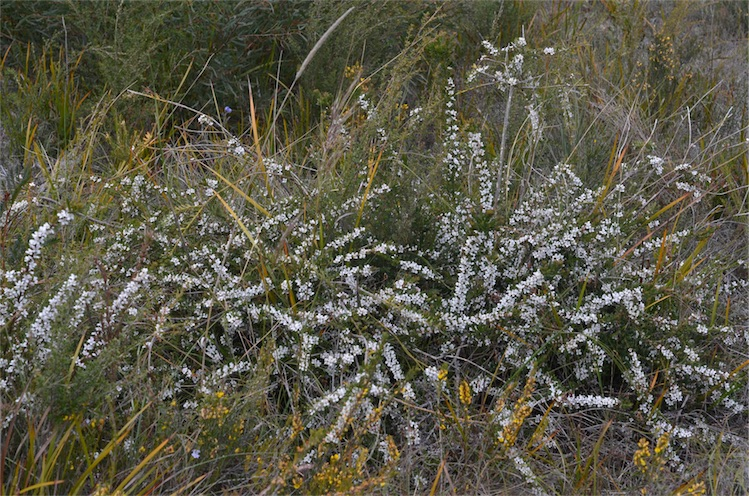
Habit

Philotheca virgata, commonly known as Tasmanian wax-flower, is a species of flowering plant in the family Rutaceae and is endemic to south-eastern Australia. It is a slender, erect shrub with wedge-shaped to oblong leaves and white or pale pink flowers at the ends of branchlets. It is the only philotheca with four sepals and petals.

== Description ==
Philotheca virgata is a slender, erect shrub that typically grows to a height of about 1–2 m (3 ft 3 in – 6 ft 7 in) and has prominently glandular warty branchlets. The leaves are sessile, narrow wedge-shaped to egg-shaped with the narrower end towards the base, 10–20 mm (0.39–0.79 in) long and 2–4 mm (0.079–0.157 in) wide and glandular warty on the upper surface. The flowers are arranged singly on the end of branchlets on a thin pedicel 4–6 mm (0.16–0.24 in) long. The four sepals are more or less round, fleshy and about 1 mm (0.039 in) long. The four petals are white or pale pink, broadly elliptic and about 5.5 mm (0.22 in) long and the eight stamens are about 8 mm (0.31 in) long and hairy. Flowering occurs from May to December and the fruit is about 5 mm (0.20 in) long with a short beak.

== Taxonomy ==
Tasmanian wax-flower was first formally described in 1840 by Joseph Dalton Hooker from an unpublished description by Allan Cunningham who gave it the name Erisotemon virgatus. Hooker published the description in The Journal of Botany. In 1998, Paul Wilson changed the name to Philotheca virgata in the journal Nuytsia.

== Distribution and habitat ==
Philotheca virgata grows in heathland and forest in coastal areas of southern and western Tasmania, south of Eden in New South Wales and in the extreme north east of Victoria.
