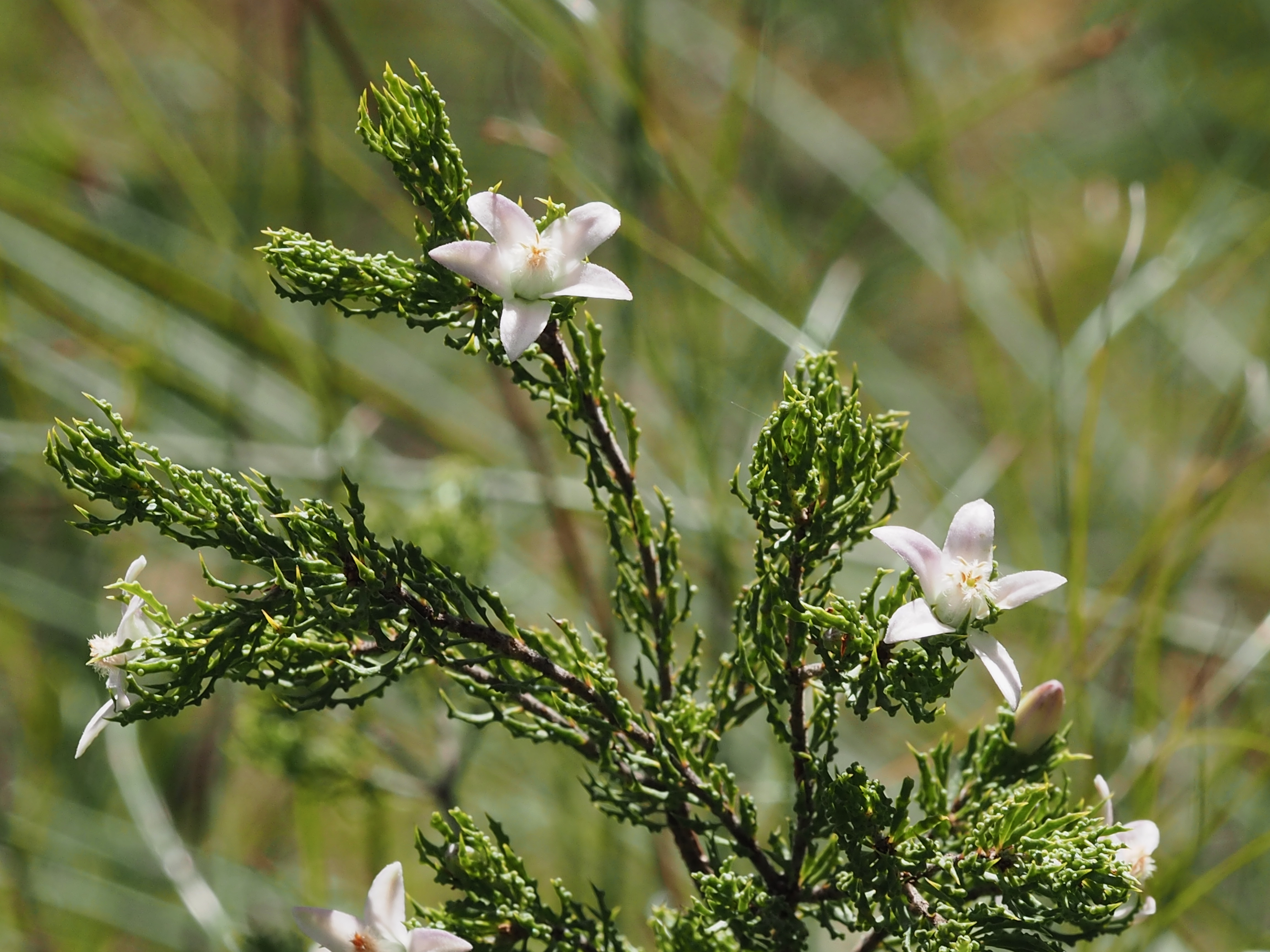

Scientific classification
- Kingdom: Plantae
- Clade: Embryophytes
- Clade: Tracheophytes
- Clade: Spermatophytes
- Clade: Angiosperms
- Clade: Eudicots
- Clade: Rosids
- Order: Sapindales
- Family: Rutaceae
- Genus: Philotheca
- Species: P. papillata

Binomial name
- Philotheca papillata I.Telford & L.M.Copel.

= Philotheca papillata =

Species of plant

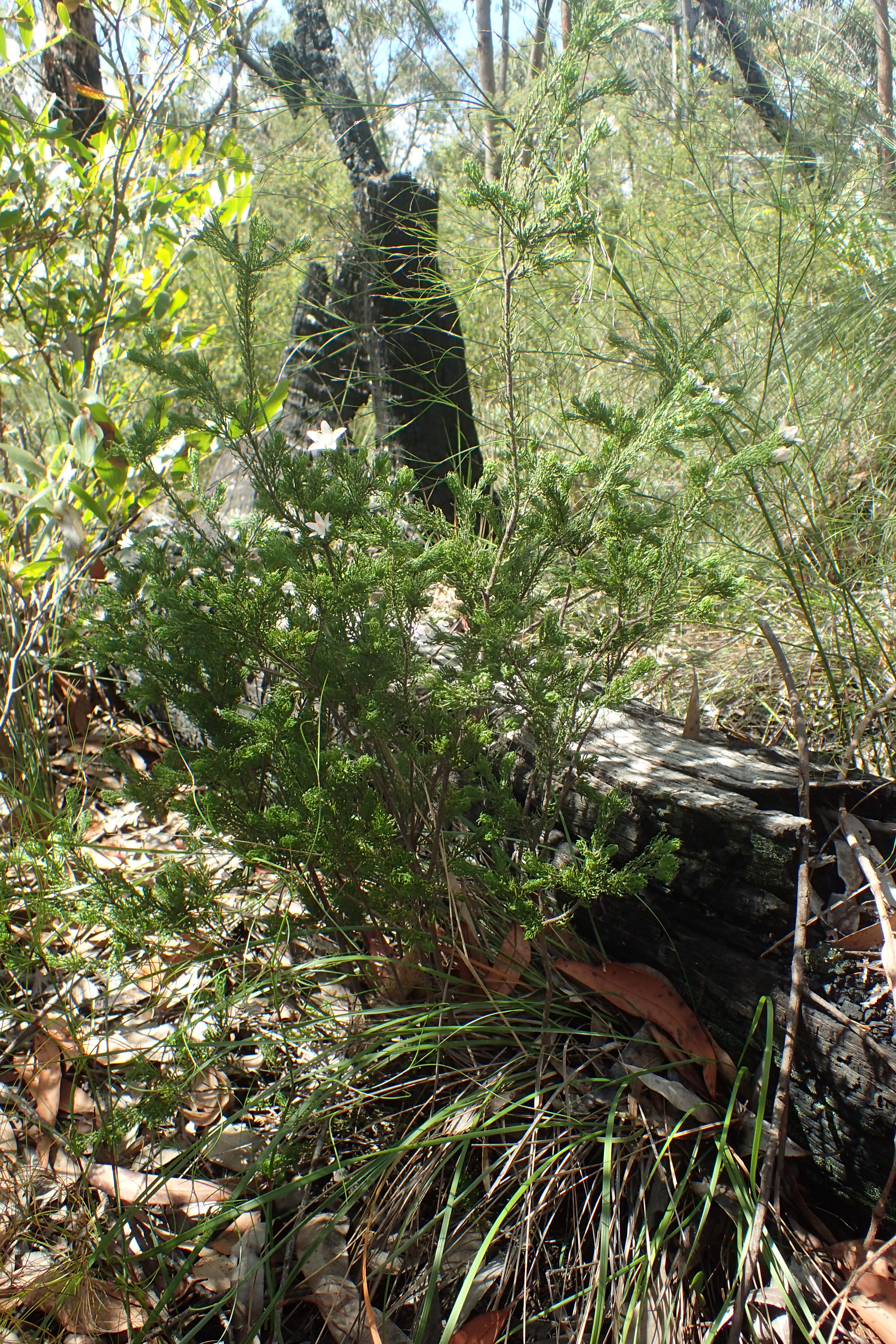
Habit in the Sherwood Nature Reserve

Philotheca papillata is a species of flowering plant in the family Rutaceae and is endemic to a restricted area of New South Wales. It is a small, erect, multistemmed shrub with glandular-warty, narrow elliptic leaves, and white to pale pink flowers arranged singly on the end of the stems.

== Description ==
Philotheca papillata is an erect, multistemmed shrub that grows to a height of about 60 cm (24 in) with its stems covered by long, soft hairs. The leaves are narrow elliptic, 9–12 mm (0.35–0.47 in) long, 1–1.5 mm (0.039–0.059 in) wide and glandular-warty with four or five glands on each side of the lower surface. The flowers are borne singly on the ends of the stems and are sessile with five more or less round sepals 1.5–2 mm (0.059–0.079 in) long and five elliptical white to pale pink petals 7–10 mm (0.28–0.39 in) long. The ten stamens are 6.5–8 mm (0.26–0.31 in) long joined at their lower half. Flowering occurs in spring.

== Taxonomy ==
Philotheca papillata was first formally described in 2006 by Ian Telford and Lachlan Copeland from specimens collected in the Sherwood Nature Reserve near Glenreagh in 2004.

== Distribution and habitat ==
This philotheca grows in heath on sandstone in the Sherwood Nature Reserve near Glenreagh.

== Conservation status ==
Philotheca papillata is listed as "vulnerable" under the New South Wales Government Biodiversity Conservation Act 2016.
