= Philotheca coateana =

Conservation status
- Priority Three — Poorly Known Taxa (DEC)

Scientific classification
- Kingdom: Plantae
- Clade: Embryophytes
- Clade: Tracheophytes
- Clade: Spermatophytes
- Clade: Angiosperms
- Clade: Eudicots
- Clade: Rosids
- Order: Sapindales
- Family: Rutaceae
- Genus: Philotheca
- Species: P. coateana

Binomial name
- Philotheca coateana Paul G.Wilson

Species of plant

Philotheca coateana is a species of flowering plant in the family Rutaceae and is endemic to Western Australia. It is a small shrub with small, elliptical leaves and white flowers with a pink midline, arranged singly on the ends of branchlets.

== Description ==
Philotheca coateana is a shrub that grows to a height of 0.5 m (1 ft 8 in) and has glabrous branchlets. The leaves are dull greyish green, elliptical, 3–4 mm (0.12–0.16 in) long with warty glands. The flowers are borne singly on the ends of the branchlets on a pedicel 1–3 mm (0.039–0.118 in) long. There are five broadly triangular sepals about 3 mm (0.12 in) long and five elliptical, white petals with a pink midline and 7–9 mm (0.28–0.35 in) long. The ten stamens are free from each other and hairy.

== Taxonomy and naming ==
Philotheca coateana was first formally described in 1998 by Paul Wilson in the journal Nuytsia from specimens collected by the naturalist Kevin Coate near the Bulga Downs Station boundary. The specific epithet honours the collector of the type specimens.

== Distribution ==
This species of philotheca grows near Menzies in the Coolgardie and Murchison biogeographic regions.

== Conservation status ==
This species is classified as "Priority Three" by the Government of Western Australia Department of Parks and Wildlife meaning that it is poorly known and known from only a few locations but is not under imminent threat.
