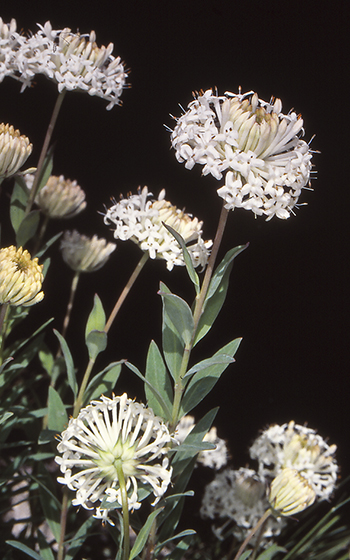

Scientific classification
- Kingdom: Plantae
- Clade: Embryophytes
- Clade: Tracheophytes
- Clade: Spermatophytes
- Clade: Angiosperms
- Clade: Eudicots
- Clade: Rosids
- Order: Malvales
- Family: Thymelaeaceae
- Genus: Pimelea
- Species: P. treyvaudii

Binomial name
- Pimelea treyvaudii F.Muell. ex Ewart & B.Rees

= Pimelea treyvaudii =

Grey rice flower

Species of shrub

Pimelea treyvaudii, commonly known as grey rice-flower, is a species of shrub in the family Thymelaeaceae. It has white flowers in spherical heads at the end of branches and is endemic to eastern Australia.

== Description ==
Pimelea treyvaudii is a small shrub 20–30 cm (7.9–11.8 in) high with smooth stems glabrous. Leaves are arranged opposite, narrowly elliptic 6–37 mm (0.24–1.46 in) long, 1–10 mm (0.039–0.394 in) wide, smooth, uniformly grey coloured, sometimes paler on the underside. The inflorescence consists of numerous flowers in a spherical shaped head. The 9-11 overlapping flower bracts are sessile, narrowly egg-shaped, narrower than nearby leaves, 6–15 mm (0.24–0.59 in) long, 1–4 mm (0.039–0.157 in) wide, smooth on the outside, hairy on inside, cream at the base, green toward the apex, sometimes a purplish colour. The bisexual white flowers are a floral tube, 10–12 mm (0.39–0.47 in) long, smooth inside, with long upward hairs above. The sepals spreading, 3–5 mm (0.12–0.20 in) long and smooth on the inside. The pedicel is hairy and the stamens may be longer or shorter than the sepals. The fruit are a dry nut thickly covered with fine hairs and forming into a densely clustered conical head. Flowering occurs from May to February.

== Taxonomy and naming ==
Pimelea treyvaudii was first formally described in 1912 by Alfred James Ewart and Bertha Rees from an unpublished description by Ferdinand von Mueller and the description was published in Proceedings of the Royal Society of Victoria. The specimens were collected near Cudgewa by H.H.Treyvaud.

== Distribution and habitat ==
Grey rice-flower grows from Gowan (north-east of Orange) in New South Wales and south-east, to north-eastern Victoria, in woodland, occasionally on dry rocky hillsides in mountainous country.
