= Maireana murrayana =

Conservation status
- Priority Three — Poorly Known Taxa (DEC)

Scientific classification
- Kingdom: Plantae
- Clade: Embryophytes
- Clade: Tracheophytes
- Clade: Spermatophytes
- Clade: Angiosperms
- Clade: Eudicots
- Order: Caryophyllales
- Family: Amaranthaceae
- Genus: Maireana
- Species: M. murrayana

Binomial name
- Maireana murrayana (Ewart & B.Rees) Paul G.Wilson

Synonyms
- Kochia murrayana Ewart & B.Rees

Species of plant in the amaranth family

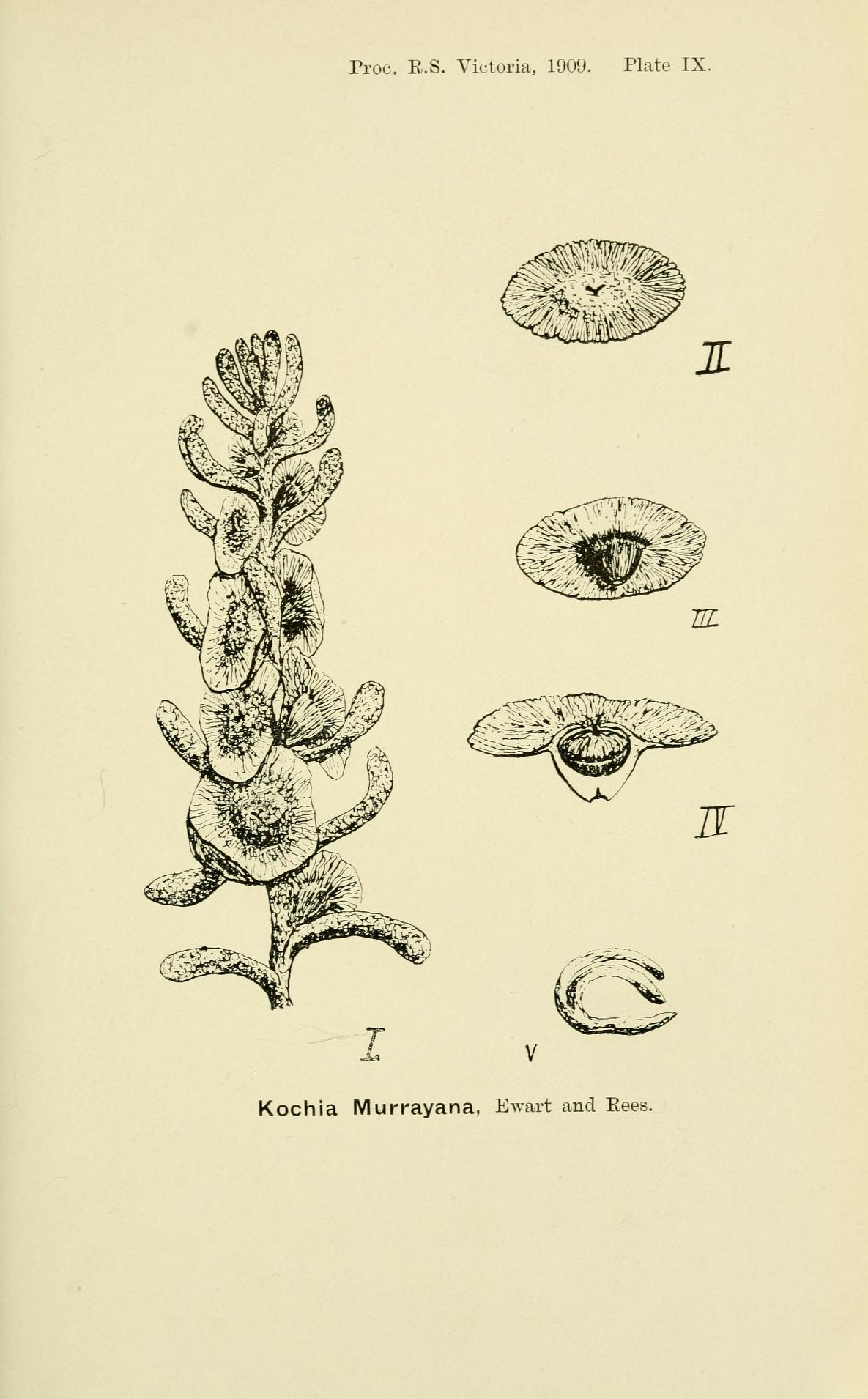
Drawing of Kochia murrayana (Maireana murrayana).

Maireana murrayana is a species of flowering plant in the family Amaranthaceae and is endemic to inland Western Australia. It is shrub with its branchlets and leaves covered with woolly hairs, thick and fleshy, narrowly oblong to wedge-shaped leaves, bisexual, woolly, spherical flowers, and a glabrous fruiting perianth with a thin, horizontal wing.

== Description ==
Maireana murrayana is a shrub with woolly hairs on its branches and leaves, and that typically grows to a height of up to 30 cm (12 in). The leaves are arranged alternately, thick and fleshy, narrowly oblong to wedge-shaped with the narrower end towards the base, about 20 mm (0.79 in) long and 4 mm (0.16 in) wide with a rounded tip and convex on the lower surface. The flowers are bisexual, arranged singly, spherical and densely woolly. The fruiting perianth is large with a broad attachment, about 2 mm (0.079 in) in diameter with a top-shaped tube, 3–4 mm (0.12–0.16 in) high, smooth and glabrous with thick, woody walls. The wing is thin, horizontal and about 20 mm (0.79 in) in diameter, sparsely woolly on top with a single slit.

== Taxonomy ==
This species was first formally described in 1909 by Alfred James Ewart and Bertha Rees who gave it the name Kochia murrayana in Proceedings of the Royal Society of Victoria. In 1975, Paul Wilson transferred the species to Maireana as M. murrayana in the journal Nuytsia. The specific epithet (murrayana) honours John Murray, the premier of Victoria from 1909 to 1912.

== Distribution and habitat ==
Maireana murrayana grows on dissected sandstone and is only known from a few collections made between the upper Gascoyne and the Murchison Rivers in the Gascoyne and Murchison bioregions of north-western Western Australia.

== Conservation status ==
Maireana murrayana is listed as "Priority Three" by the Government of Western Australia, Department of Biodiversity, Conservation and Attractions, meaning that it is poorly known and known from only a few locations, but is not under imminent threat.
