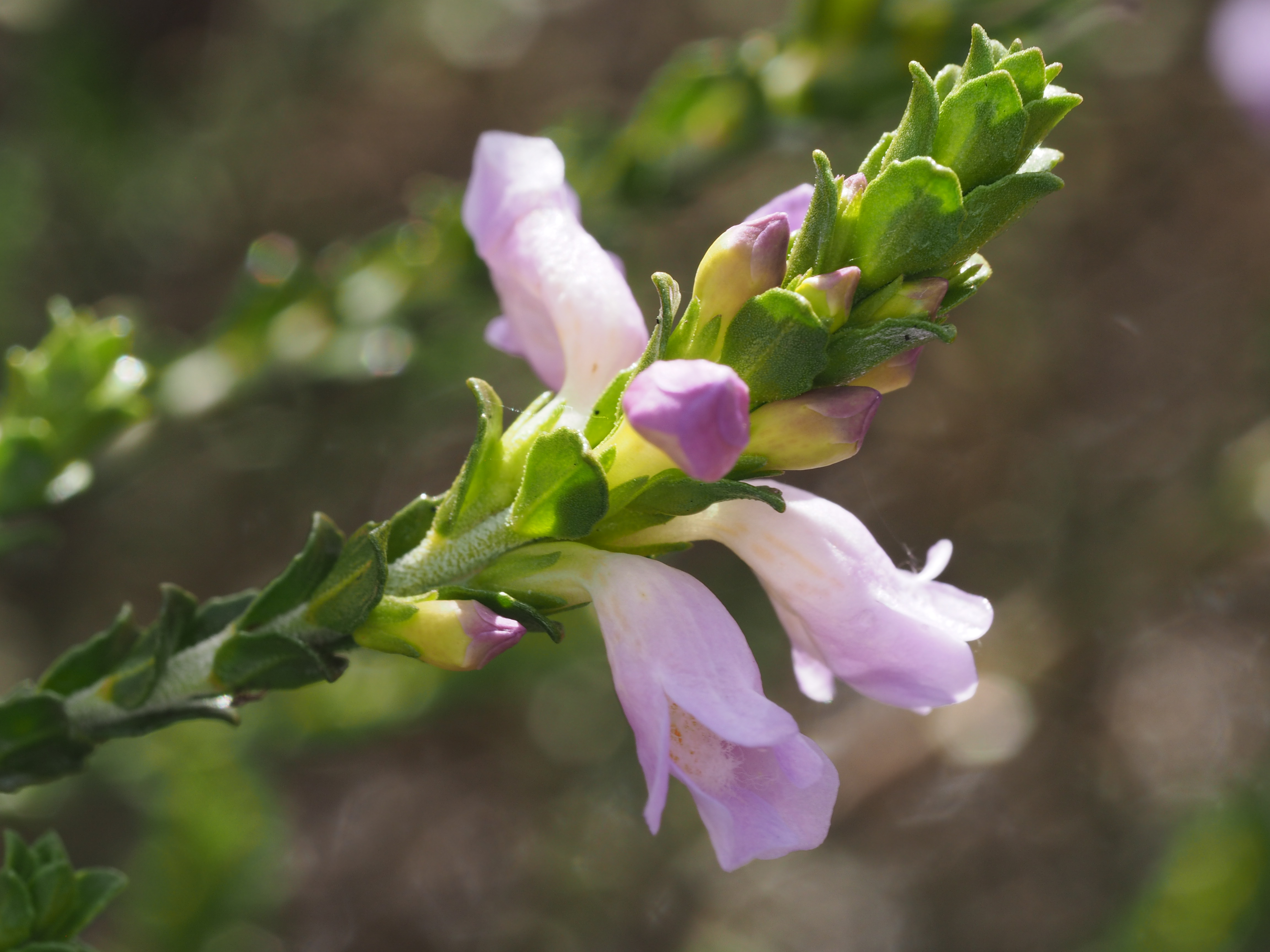
- Eremophila lehmanniana leaves and flowers

Scientific classification
- Kingdom: Plantae
- Clade: Embryophytes
- Clade: Tracheophytes
- Clade: Spermatophytes
- Clade: Angiosperms
- Clade: Eudicots
- Clade: Asterids
- Order: Lamiales
- Family: Scrophulariaceae
- Genus: Eremophila
- Species: E. lehmanniana

Binomial name
- Eremophila lehmanniana (Sond.) Chinnock

Synonyms
- Bondtia woolsiana Kuntze orth. var.; Bontia woollsiana (F.Muell.) Kuntze; Eremophila woollsiana F.Muell.; Eremophila woollsiana var. dentata Ewart & Jean White; Eremophila woollsiana F.Muell. var. woollsiana; Halgania lehmanniana Sond.; Pholidia woollsiana (F.Muell.) Benth.; Pholidia woollsiana var. dentata Kraenzl.; Pholidia woollsiana (F.Muell.) Benth. var. woollsiana; Pholidia woolsiana Kraenzl. orth. var.; Pholidia woolsiana var. dentata Kraenzl. orth. var.

= Eremophila lehmanniana =

Species of flowering plant

Eremophila lehmanniana is a flowering plant in the figwort family, Scrophulariaceae and is endemic to Western Australia. It is an erect shrub, usually with short, wide, serrated leaves and white to lilac-coloured flowers. It occurs in the south west of Western Australia.

== Description ==
Eremophila lehmanniana is an erect, sometimes spreading shrub that usually grows to a height of between 0.5 and 2.5 m (2 and 8 ft). The leaves are arranged alternately along the branches, sometimes overlap each other, and are usually elliptic to egg-shaped, mostly 4–10 mm (0.2–0.4 in) long, 2–5 mm (0.08–0.2 in) wide, often shiny and sticky when young and often have prominent, rounded teeth on their margins.

The flowers are usually borne singly in leaf axils on a straight, glabrous stalk, up to 4 mm (0.2 in) long. There are 5 overlapping, green, lance-shaped, sepals, 2–4 mm (0.08–0.2 in) long. The petals are 7–11.5 mm (0.3–0.5 in) long and are joined at their lower end to form a tube. The petal tube is white to lilac-coloured on the outside, white inside and there are pale yellow-brown spots on the lowest petal lobe. Both surfaces of the petal tube and lobes are glabrous but the inside of the tube is filled with long, soft hairs. The 4 stamens are fully enclosed in the petal tube. Flowering occurs from July to November and the fruits that follow are dry with a crusty covering, oval-shaped and 2.5–4 mm (0.1–0.2 in) long.

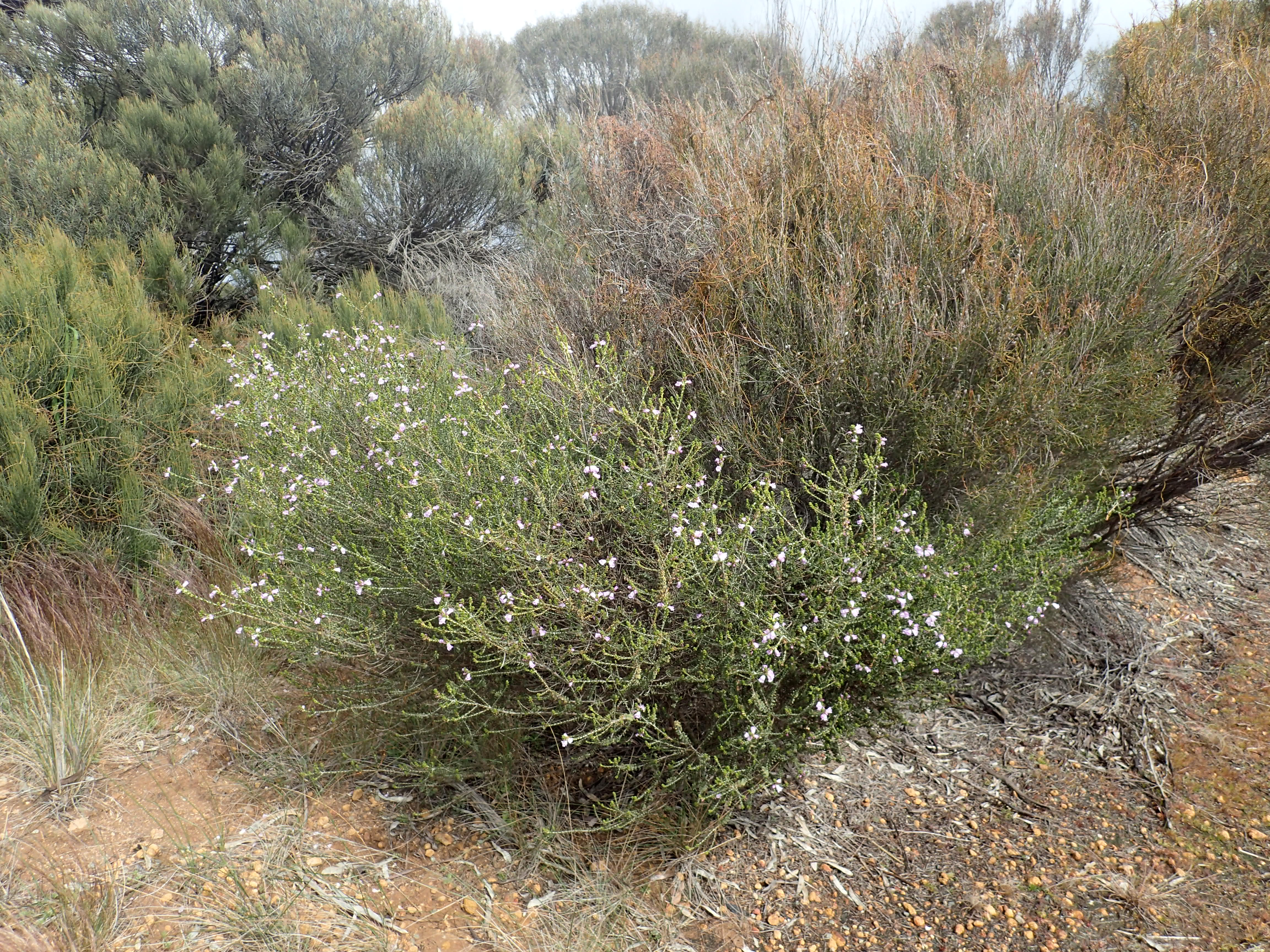
E. lehmanniana growing near Kondinin

== Taxonomy and naming ==
The species was first formally described by Otto Wilhelm Sonder in 1848 and given the name Halgania lehmanniana. The description was published in Johann Georg Christian Lehmann's 1848 Plantae Preissianae. In 1981, Robert Chinnock changed the name to Eremophila lehmanniana. The specific epithet (lehmanniana) honours the botanist, J.G.C. Lehmann.

== Distribution and habitat ==
Eremophila lehmanniana occurs between Esperance and Geraldton in the Avon Wheatbelt, Coolgardie, Esperance Plains, Geraldton Sandplains and Mallee biogeographic regions. It is found growing on a range of soil types, usually in open woodland.

== Conservation status ==
This species is classified as "not threatened" by the Western Australian Government Department of Parks and Wildlife.

== Use in horticulture ==
This eremophila is very hardy and suitable for a low maintenance garden. It has been grown in all mainland states of Australia and can tolerate temperatures as low as −6 °C (20 °F). It is easily propagated from cuttings and grows in most soils, including clay in full sun or partial shade. It only needs an occasional watering in long droughts and will grow in humid areas like Sydney, although it does need some protection from strong winds.
