= Acacia kochii =

Scientific classification
- Kingdom: Plantae
- Clade: Embryophytes
- Clade: Tracheophytes
- Clade: Spermatophytes
- Clade: Angiosperms
- Clade: Eudicots
- Clade: Rosids
- Order: Fabales
- Family: Fabaceae
- Subfamily: Caesalpinioideae
- Clade: Mimosoid clade
- Genus: Acacia
- Species: A. kochii

Binomial name
- Acacia kochii W.Fitzg. ex Ewart & Jean White
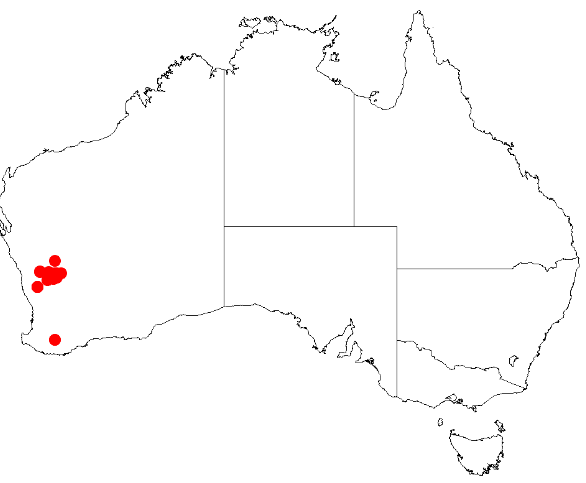
- Occurrence data from AVH

Synonyms
- Acacia kochii W.Fitzg. nom. superfl.; Racosperma kochii (W.Fitzg. ex Ewart & Jean White) Pedley

Species of legume

Acacia kochii is a species of flowering plant in the family Fabaceae and is endemic the south-west of Western Australia. It is a spreading, intricate shrub with thorns along the branchlets, asymmetrical narrowly oblong phyllodes in groups, oblong to short-cylindrical heads of golden yellow flowers and leathery, glabrous pods, appearing like a string of beads.

== Description ==
Acacia kochii is a spreading, intricate shrub that typically grows to a height of 0.5–2 m (1 ft 8 in – 6 ft 7 in) and has more or less glabrous branchlets with one or two thorns 5–20 mm (0.20–0.79 in) long at many of its nodes. It has phyllodes are clustered at mature lobes, asymetrically narrowly oblong, often half-moon shaped, 10–20 mm (0.39–0.79 in) long, 2–7 mm (0.079–0.276 in) wide thin and more or less glabrous. The flowers are borne in up to three oblong to short-cylindrical heads in each cluster of phyllodes, on peduncles 10–20 mm (0.39–0.79 in) long, each head 7–15 mm (0.28–0.59 in) long and 5–6 mm (0.20–0.24 in) in diameter with golden yellow flowers. Flowering occurs in August, and the pods are leathery, up to 90 mm (3.5 in) long and 5 mm (0.20 in) wide, glabrous, with a slight covering of white powdery bloom and appearing like a string of beads. The seeds are elliptic, about 5 mm (0.20 in) long, dull black with a more or less conical aril.

== Taxonomy ==
Acacia kochii was first formally described in 1911 by Alfred Ewart and Jean White-Haney in the Proceedings of the Royal Society of Victoria from an unpublished description by William Fitzgerald of specimens collected near the "Watheroo Rabbit fence" by Max Koch in 1905. The specific epithet (kochii) honours Max Koch.

== Distribution and habitat ==
This species of wattle grows in rocky clay loam, clay or clayey sand in the area between Wubin and Paynes Find in the Avon Wheatbelt, Geraldton Sandplains, Yalgoo bioregions of south-western Western Australia.

== Conservation status ==
Acacia kochii is listed as 'not threatened' by the Government of Western Australia Department of Parks and Wildlife.

== See also ==
- List of Acacia species
