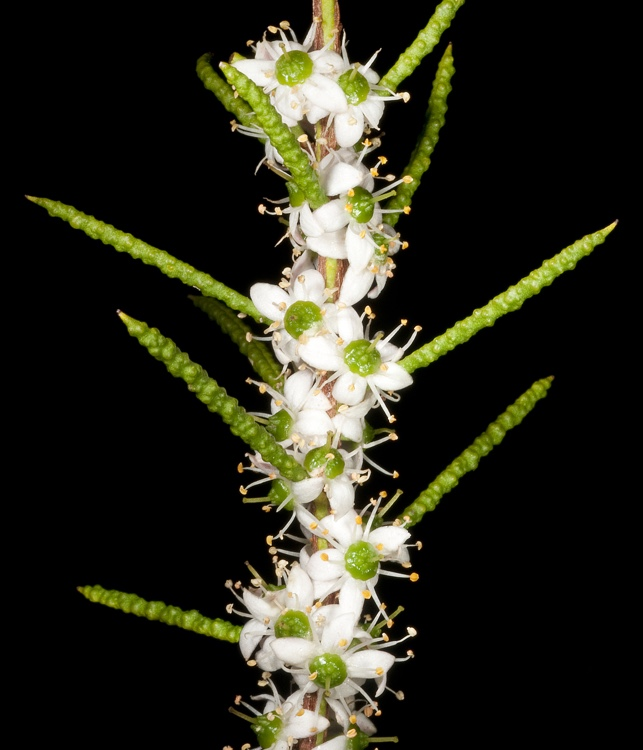
- Near Beacon, Western Australia

Scientific classification
- Kingdom: Plantae
- Clade: Tracheophytes
- Clade: Angiosperms
- Clade: Eudicots
- Clade: Rosids
- Order: Sapindales
- Family: Rutaceae
- Genus: Philotheca
- Species: P. deserti

Binomial name
- Philotheca deserti (E.Pritzl.) Paul G.Wilson

Synonyms
- Eriostemon deserti E.Pritz. orth. var.; Eriostemon desertii E.Pritz.; Eriostemon intermedius Ewart nom. illeg.; Phebalium deserti Ewart & B.Rees orth. var.; Phebalium desertii (E.Pritz.) Ewart & B.Rees

= Philotheca deserti =

Species of plant

Philotheca deserti is a species of flowering plant in the family Rutaceae and is endemic to inland Western Australia. It is an erect shrub with narrow, spindle-shaped, glandular-warty leaves and white flowers arranged singly in leaf axils.

== Description ==
Philotheca deserti is a shrub that grows to a height of 1–2 m (3 ft 3 in – 6 ft 7 in) with corky branchlets. The leaves are narrow, spindle-shaped, glandular-warty, 20–30 mm (0.79–1.18 in) long and channelled on the upper surface. The flowers are usually borne singly, rarely in groups of two or three, in leaf axils, each flower on a pedicel 0.5–5.5 mm (0.020–0.217 in) long. There are five round sepals about 1 mm (0.039 in) long and five egg-shaped white petals about 3 mm (0.12 in) long. The ten stamens are each free from each other. Flowering occurs from April to June or in October, and the fruit is about 2.5 mm (0.098 in) long with a short beak.

== Taxonomy and naming ==
This philotheca was first formally described in 1904 by Ernst Georg Pritzel who gave it the name Eriostemon desertii and published the description in Botanische Jahrbücher für Systematik, Pflanzengeschichte und Pflanzengeographie from specimens he collected near Southern Cross. In 1998, Paul Wilson changed the name to Philotheca deserti and described two subspecies in the journal Nuytsia.

- Philotheca deserti subsp. brevifolia Paul G.Wilson has leaves 3–5 mm (0.12–0.20 in) long;
- Philotheca deserti (E.Pritz.) Paul G.Wilson subsp. deserti has leaves 20–30 mm (0.79–1.18 in) long.

== Distribution and habitat ==
Philotheca deserti grows on undulating plains and hills between Kalgoorlie, Menzies and Yalgoo in the Avon Wheatbelt, Coolgardie and Murchison biogeographic regions.

== Conservation status ==
This species is classified as "not threatened" by the Western Australian Government Department of Parks and Wildlife, but subspecies brevifolia is listed as "Priority Three" by the Government of Western Australia Department of Parks and Wildlife meaning that it is poorly known and known from only a few locations but is not under imminent threat.
