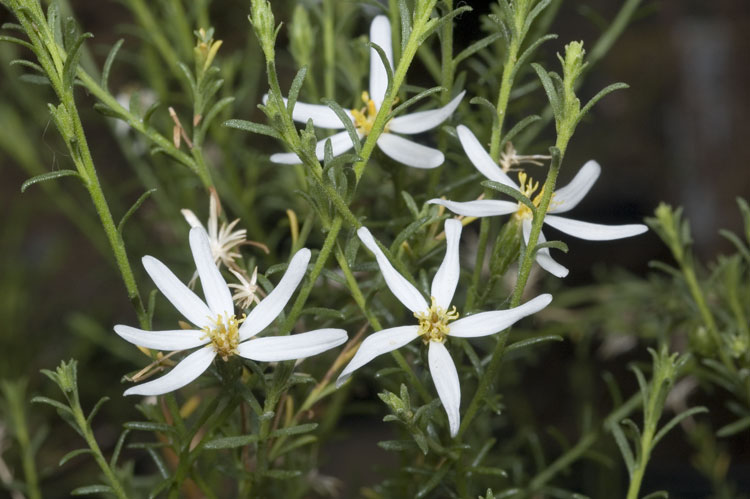
- Subspecies passerinoides in the Australian National Botanic Gardens

Scientific classification
- Kingdom: Plantae
- Clade: Embryophytes
- Clade: Tracheophytes
- Clade: Spermatophytes
- Clade: Angiosperms
- Clade: Eudicots
- Clade: Asterids
- Order: Asterales
- Family: Asteraceae
- Genus: Olearia
- Species: O. passerinoides

Binomial name
- Olearia passerinoides (Turcz.) Benth.

Synonyms
- Aster vernicifluus F.Muell. nom. illeg., nom. superfl.; Aster vernicosus F.Muell.; Diplopappus passerinoides Turcz.; Olearia toppii Ewart & Jean White; Olearia vernicosa F.Muell. nom. inval., pro syn.

= Olearia passerinoides =

Species of plant

Olearia passerinoides, commonly known as slender daisy bush, is a species of flowering plant in the family Asteraceae and is endemic to southern continental Australia. It is a slender, sticky shrub with linear leaves, and white or pale mauve and mauve or pink daisy flowers.

== Description ==
Olearia passerinoides is a slender, glabrous, sticky shrub that typically grows to a height of up to 2 m (6 ft 7 in). Its branchlets are arranged alternately, more or less sessile and pressed against the stem, linear, 4–25 mm (0.16–0.98 in) long and 0.5–1 mm (0.020–0.039 in) wide. The heads or daisy-like "flowers" are arranged singly or in corymbs on the ends of branches and are 11–23 mm (0.43–0.91 in) wide on a peduncle up to 10 mm (0.39 in) long, the involucre bell-shaped and 5–6 mm (0.20–0.24 in) long. Each flower has six to fifteen white or pale mauve ray florets, the ligule 4–10 mm (0.16–0.39 in) long surrounding four to fourteen mauve or pink disc florets. Flowering occurs throughout the year and the achenes are silky-hairy and 1.5–2 mm (0.059–0.079 in) long, the pappus with 33 to 47 bristles.

== Taxonomy ==
This daisy bush was first formally described in 1851 by Nikolai Turczaninow, who gave it the name Diplopappus passerinoides in Bulletin de la Société Impériale des Naturalistes de Moscou, based on plant material collected by James Drummond. In 1867, George Bentham changed the name to Olearia passerinoides in Flora Australiensis. The specific epithet (passerinoides) means "Passerina-like".

In 1985, David Cooke described two subspecies of O. passerinoides in the Journal of the Adelaide Botanic Gardens, and the names are accepted by the Australian Plant Census:

- Olearia passerinoides subsp. glutescens (Sond.) D.A.Cooke has the heads arranged in corymbs with eight to fifteen ray florets, the ligules 6–10 mm (0.24–0.39 in) long.
- Olearia passerinoides (Turcz.) Benth. subsp. passerinoides (Sond.) D.A.Cooke has the heads arranged singly with six to nine ray florets, the ligules 4–6 mm (0.16–0.24 in) long.

== Distribution and habitat ==
Olearia passerinoides grows in mallee, forest and shrubland in southern continental Australia. Only subsp. passerinoides is listed as occurring in Western Australia. Both subspecies are listed as occurring in New South Wales, Victoria and South Australia. In Victoria, subsp. glutinosa is only known from near Inglewood but subspecies passerinoides is more widely distributed but rare, in the north-west of that state.
