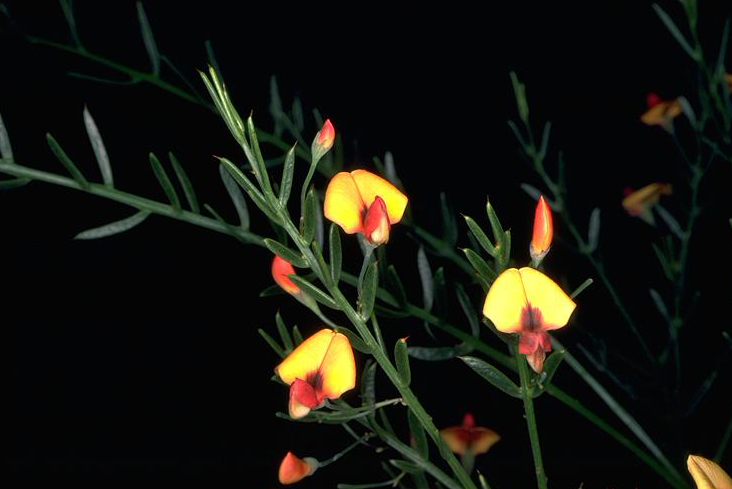

Conservation status
- Priority Two — Poorly Known Taxa (DEC)

Scientific classification
- Kingdom: Plantae
- Clade: Tracheophytes
- Clade: Angiosperms
- Clade: Eudicots
- Clade: Rosids
- Order: Fabales
- Family: Fabaceae
- Subfamily: Faboideae
- Genus: Daviesia
- Species: D. mesophylla

Binomial name
- Daviesia mesophylla Ewart

= Daviesia mesophylla =

Species of flowering plant

Daviesia mesophylla is a species of flowering plant in the family Fabaceae and is endemic to the south-west of Western Australia. It is a low-lying, glabrous shrub with sharply-pointed, linear or narrowly egg-shaped phyllodes with the narrower end towards the base, and yellow to orange, red and cream-coloured flowers.

== Description ==
Daviesia mesophylla is a low-lying, glossy green, glabrous shrub that typically grows to a height of 1–2 m (3 ft 3 in – 6 ft 7 in) and has ridged branchlets. Its phyllodes are sharply-pointed, linear to narrowly egg-shaped with the narrower end towards the base, vertically flattened, 7–15 mm (0.28–0.59 in) long and 0.75–2.0 mm (0.030–0.079 in) wide. The flowers are arranged singly or in pairs in leaf axils on a peduncle 0.5–5 mm (0.020–0.197 in) long, each flower on a pedicel 4.0–5.5 mm (0.16–0.22 in) long. The sepals are 4.0–4.5 mm (0.16–0.18 in) long and joined at the base, the two upper lobes joined for most of their length and the three lower lobes triangular and about 1.0–1.5 mm (0.039–0.059 in) long. The standard petal is broadly egg-shaped with a notched centre, 7.5–8.0 mm (0.30–0.31 in) long and yellow to orange with a dark red centre, the wings about 6.5–7.5 mm (0.26–0.30 in) long and light red, the keel about 7.5 mm (0.30 in) long and cream-coloured. Flowering occurs from October to April and the fruit is an inflated triangular pod 12.0–14.5 mm (0.47–0.57 in) long.

== Taxonomy and naming ==
Daviesia mesophylla was first formally described in 1907 by Alfred James Ewart in Proceedings of the Royal Society of Victoria. The specific epithet (mesophylla) means "middle-leaved", apparently referring to the inner leaf tissue.

== Distribution and habitat ==
This daviesia grows in sand and on rocky slopes in mallee-heath and heath in the Stirling Range and near Denmark in the Esperance Plains and Jarrah Forest biogeographic regions of south-western Western Australia.

== Conservation status ==
Daviesia mesophylla is listed as "Priority Two" by the Western Australian Government Department of Biodiversity, Conservation and Attractions, meaning that it is poorly known and from only one or a few locations.
