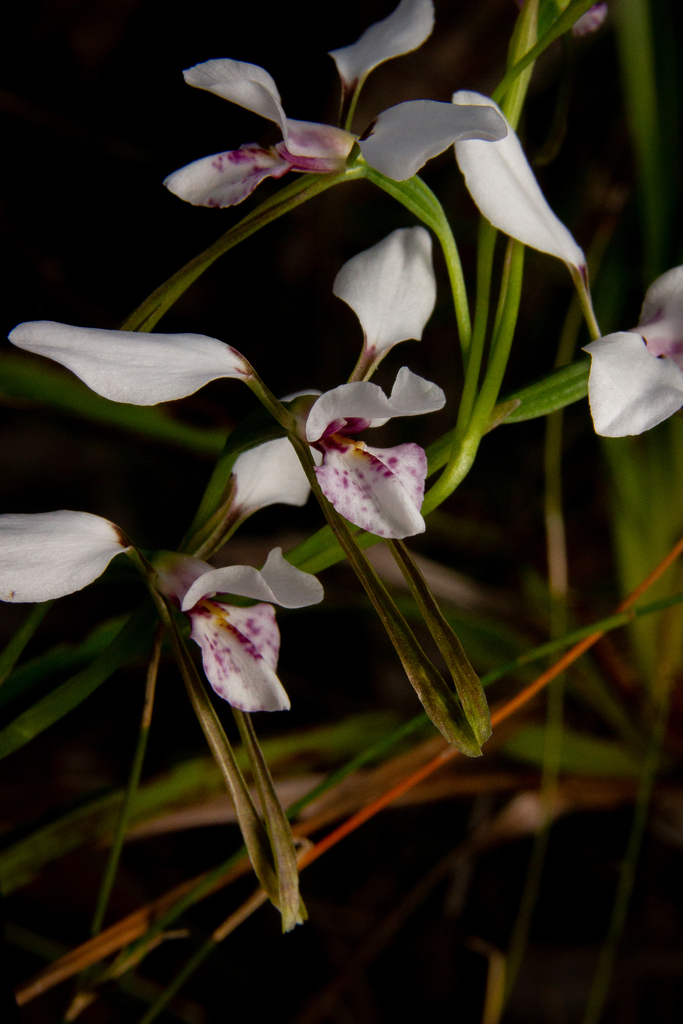
- On the Central Coast

Scientific classification
- Kingdom: Plantae
- Clade: Embryophytes
- Clade: Tracheophytes
- Clade: Angiosperms
- Clade: Monocots
- Order: Asparagales
- Family: Orchidaceae
- Subfamily: Orchidoideae
- Tribe: Diurideae
- Genus: Diuris
- Species: D. alba

Binomial name
- Diuris alba R.Br.

Synonyms
- Diuris punctata var. alba (R.Br.) Ewart & B.Rees; Diuris punctata var. alba (R.Br.) Dockrill isonym

= Diuris alba =

White donkey orchid

Species of orchid

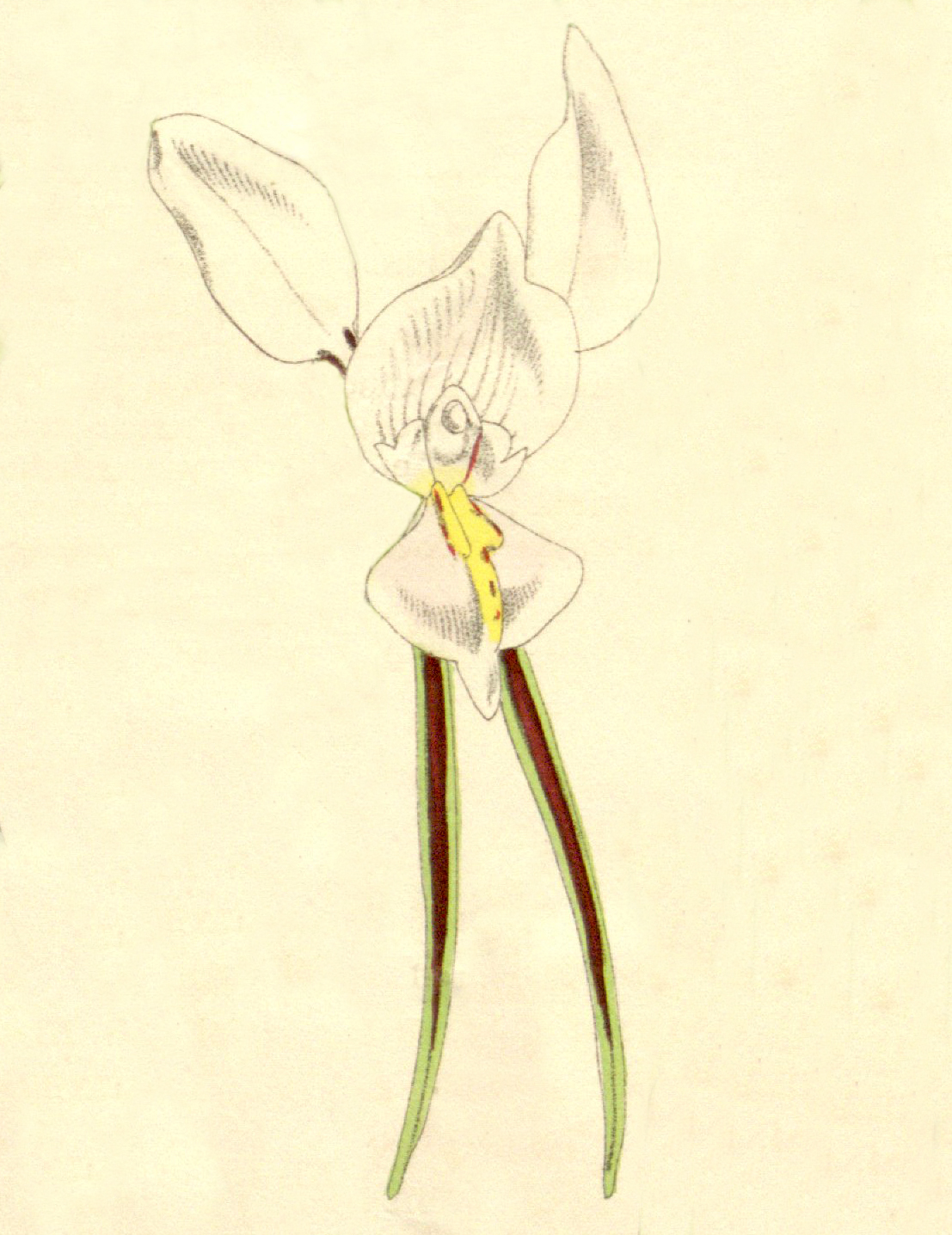
Illustration from Curtis's Botanical Magazine

Diuris alba, commonly called the white donkey orchid, is a species of orchid which is endemic to eastern Australia. It has up to three leaves, and a flowering stem with up to seven white flowers with purplish markings.

== Description ==
Diuris alba is a tuberous, perennial herb, usually growing to a height of 150–400 mm (6–20 in). There are up to three linear leaves arising from the base of the plant, each leaf 100–300 mm (4–10 in) long, 2–3 mm (0.08–0.1 in) wide and rolled so that the sides of the leaf face each other. There are between two and seven white flowers with lilac or purple markings arranged on a flowering stem, each flower about 20 mm (0.8 in) wide. The dorsal sepal is egg-shaped, 8–17 mm (0.3–0.7 in) long and 5–9 mm (0.2–0.4 in) wide with its margins turned downwards. The lateral sepals are linear to lance-shaped, 20–40 mm (0.8–2 in) long, 2–3 mm (0.08–0.1 in) wide and turned downwards, either parallel to each other or crossed. The petals are erect, ear-like above the flower, 10–22 mm (0.4–0.9 in) long and 4–8 mm (0.2–0.3 in) wide with a dark-coloured, stalk-like "claw" 4–6 mm (0.16–0.24 in) long. The labellum is 10–14 mm (0.4–0.6 in) long and has three lobes. The central lobe is a broad egg shape to almost circular, 7–11 mm (0.3–0.4 in) wide with a raised midline. The lateral lobes are linear to lance-shaped with the narrower end towards the base, 3–4 mm (0.1–0.2 in) long and 1–2 mm (0.04–0.08 in) wide. There are two broad calli 5–6 mm (0.20–0.24 in) long. Flowering occurs from August to November.

== Taxonomy and naming ==
Diuris alba was first formally described in 1810 by Robert Brown and the description was published in Prodromus florae Novae Hollandiae. The specific epithet (alba) is a Latin word meaning "white".

== Distribution and habitat ==
The white donkey orchid occurs on the coast and nearby ranges of New South Wales and Queensland north from the Central Coast. It grows with grasses in forest.
