= Fellow of the Royal Society of Victoria =

ROYAL Security OF Victoria

The Fellowship of the Royal Society of Victoria is an historically recent college made up of about 30 Australian scientists and proponents of scientific literacy.

Fellows judged by their peers to have made an exceptional contribution to their field and/or to the public appreciation of science may be elected to Fellowship of the Society. Fellows are often denoted using the post-nominal FRSV (Fellow of the Royal Society of Victoria).

Fellows are appointed for life; this table also contains deceased fellows.

== Fellows ==
Yr	Fellow	Notes	Born	Died	Refs
1995	David Hungerford Ashton	One of Australia's most regarded botanist and a leading authority on the ecology of Australia's mountain ash (Eucalyptus regnans) forests. He was Associate Professor of Botany at the University of Melbourne until his retirement in 1989.	1927	2005	
1995	Herbert Howard Bolotin	Emeritus Professor of Physics at the University of Melbourne.	1930	2020	
1995	Dewar Wilson Goode	Initiated the formation of the Victorian National Parks Authority (now the National Parks Service), was a member of the Environmental Planning Commission of the IUCN, and was a foundation member of the Australian Conservation Foundation.	1907	2002	
1995	Phillip Garth Law	Director, Antarctic Division, Department of External Affairs and Leader of the Australian National Antarctic Research Expeditions 1949-1966. He founded the Mawson, Davis and Casey bases in Antarctica.	1912	2010	
1996	Jerry McKee Adams	Noted for his achievements in molecular biology, immunology and the molecular genetics of cancer with wife Suzanne Cory.	1940		
1996	Suzanne Cory	Director of the Walter and Eliza Hall Institute of Medical Research from 1996 to 2009. With husband Jerry Adams, one of the first two scientists to pioneer gene cloning techniques in Australia, and to successfully clone mammalian genes.	1942		
1996	Clive Keith Coogan	An inventor and expert in solid state physics who also went on to work in science education and promote pathways for the development of the Australian scientific instrument manufacturing industry.	1925	2005	
1996	Gustav Joseph Victor Nossal	Director of the Walter and Eliza Hall Institute of Medical Research 1965-1996 and Professor of Medical Biology at the University of Melbourne. Distinguished for his contributions to the fields of antibody formation and immunological tolerance.	1931		
1996	Arvi Hillar Parbo	Company Director of a variety of companies, in the fields of science and finance.	1926	2019	
1996	Graeme Ivan Pearman	Chief of CSIRO Atmospheric Research from 1992 to 2002. His research has been mostly in the field of atmospheric composition and in particular the global carbon cycle.	1941		
1996	John Alfred Talent	Distinguished paleontologiest, paleobiologist and Earth scientist. Recognised as committed advocate for research integrity in his field.	1932	2024	
1999	James Maurice Bowler	A geomorphologist focussed on the landforms and soils in arid and semi-arid areas of Australia, investigating the hydrology of ancient Australia and how water levels in Australia tied into global climatic events. While doing fieldwork in the Willandra Lakes in 1968 he discovered the cremated remains of what came to be called Mungo Lady, exposed on the surface of the soil and at risk of erosion and destruction. This and subsequent discoveries provided evidence of Aboriginal presence in Australia for much longer than had been supposed.	1930		
1999	Nancy Fannie Millis	Professor of Microbiology at the University of Melbourne 1982-1991. One of the pioneers of the study of fermentation technology and a champion of gene technology development in Australia.	1922	2012	
2001	Yvonne Aitken	An agricultural scientist whose research centred on how plant species adapt to climate through the differing flowering responses of early and late varieties and how this in turn affects the growing period. She contributed to the search for better crop and pasture species for Australia by increasing our understanding of genetic factors within a species that control reproductive development in different seasons and climates.	1911	2004	
2001	Martin Robert Harris	A medtech inventor and co-founder of Optiscan, a company concerned with the development, manufacture and commercialisation of endomicroscopic imaging technologies for medical, tranlational and pre-clinical applications.	1943		
2001	Barry Jones	Polymath and political advocate for the sciences	1932		
2001	John Francis Lovering	Geologist concerned with the formation of the Earth and stratigraphy, discovering a common source of iron meteorites and leading the discovery of the mineral tranquillityte from lunar rock. Leadership contributions as Vice-Chancellor of Flinders University, Chairman of the Environment Conservation Council and President of the Murray Darling Basin Commission.	1930	2023	
2004	Thomas A Darragh		1940		
2004	Joyce Richardson		1925	2019	
2005	Hilary J Harrington		1924	2015	
2005	Murray Littlejohn		1932		
2007	David Vernon Boger		1939	2025	
2010	Milton Thomas William Hearn		1943		
2017	Peter C Doherty		1940		
2018	Lynne Selwood		1939		
2019	Sandra Rees		1942		
2020	Tom Beer		1947		
2020	Jenny Graves		1941		
2020	Pauline Ladiges		1948		
2020	Peter Thorne		1940		
2021	Peter Baines	For his contribution to the geophysical sciences, to global scientific societies, to the development of our understanding of stratified fluid dynamics, the oceanography of Australian waters, the complex interactions of the global climate system, and to the leadership of the Royal Society of Victoria.	1941		
2021	William Birch	For his contributions to the public understanding of the geology of southeastern Australia, to the study of Victorian minerals and gemstones, to the publication of the work of Victorian scientists, and to the leadership of the Royal Society of Victoria.	1949		
2021	Rachel Webster	For her leadership of Australian research in the field of astrophysics, her contributions to the advancement of early career researchers, and to the engagement with astronomy by students in regions experiencing disadvantage.	1951		
2021	Nicola Williams	For her contributions to the teaching of chemistry, to the history of science and mineral exploration in Australia, and to the leadership of the Royal Society of Victoria.	1940		
2022	Brendan Wintle	For his intersectoral leadership in defining the nature and scope of biodiversity decline in Australia, developing clear, tractable measures for governments to halt and reverse damage to Australian ecosystems and threatened species, and the historic establishment of an Australian Biodiversity Council to foster better public understanding, collaboration and action on the biodiversity crisis.	1971		
2022	Fern Hames	For her contributions to the communication and public understanding of environmental science, the leadership of globally significant environmental research efforts conducted within the Victorian government’s Arthur Rylah Institute, and the leadership development of other women in Science, Technology, Engineering, Mathematics and Medicine through the Homeward Bound initiative.	1960		
2022	Judith Downes	For her outstanding development of the Maths Olympiad program in Victoria for students with high potential, her commitment to promoting positive environmental and social impact practices in the finance sector, her business leadership of clean energy and medical diagnostic device companies, and her global leadership in driving the agenda for the Global Alliance for Banking on Values Governing Board Forum.	1960		
2022	Damein Bell	For his leadership of the Gunditj Mirring Aboriginal Corporation, his contribution to the UNESCO World Heritage listing of the Budj Bim Cultural Landscape, his commitment to the health of the lands and waters of Gundijtmara Country through establishing Indigenous Protected Areas and stewarding new governance programs for environmental water, and to the wellbeing of Indigenous Australians.	1968		
