= Donald Mervyn Sheldon =

Australian surgeon

Associate Professor Donald Mervyn Sheldon (5 January 1937 – 16 March 2007) was a surgeon training and working at the Royal Prince Alfred Hospital in Sydney with specialist training in gastro-intestinal surgery.

Throughout his career, Sheldon had various roles in both a teaching and working capacity. He held teaching and working roles at the Royal Prince Alfred Hospital, The Royal Flying Doctor Service, Port Moresby in Papua New Guinea, Marrickville Hospital, The University of Sydney, New South Wales Private Hospital, and Vung Tau in South Vietnam as well as St George Hospital in London.

Throughout his lifetime, Sheldon received various accolades and awards including but not limited to the Bruce Shepherd medal, Gordon-Taylor Memorial Prize, Justin Fleming Gold Medal from the Australian Association of Surgeons, Vietnam Logistics and Support Medal, Graham Coupland Lecture from the Royal Australasian College of Surgeons, and the Active Service Medal.

He had a large family survived by his wife, 4 children and 13 grand children.

== Early education and medical school ==
Sheldon attended and excelled at both Earlwood Primary School and Canterbury Boys' High School. He went on to dux his school as well as be elected Vice Captain in 1953. He was accepted into study Medicine at the University of Sydney from where he graduated as a Doctor in 1960. He began his surgical training at Royal Prince Alfred Hospital the following year. Throughout his training, Sheldon was an anatomical prosector and has a lateral knee joint dissection still displayed at the University of Sydney today.

== Surgical training ==
Sheldon commenced surgical training after graduating from the University of Sydney in 1960. He was top of his cohort in the Primary Surgical Fellowship Exam for which he won the Gordon Taylor Prize as the best basic sciences candidate from both Australia and New Zealand. He commenced as a surgical registrar at Royal Prince Alfred Hospital in 1963.

Throughout his work at Royal Prince Alfred Hospital, Sheldon was involved with teams travelling to Port Moresby, South Vietnam, and with the Royal Flying Doctor Service during his career.

By 1968, Sheldon had completed his surgical training and was appointed both honorary surgeon and staff surgeon at Marrickville and Royal Prince Alfred Hospitals respectively. He was also appointed superintendent at Royal Prince Alfred Hospital earlier in 1966.It was in this year that Sheldon met Rodney Smith who was visiting Royal Prince Alfred Hospital as a guest professor. After discussion, Sheldon was invited to be Rodney's surgical registrar where he worked at St George's Hospital in London as a British Commonwealth Scholar. During his time working and training at St George's, Sheldon worked on the management of complex hepatobiliary conditions including those involving surgical injuries to the bile duct.

Whilst he was working and training in London, Sheldon passed the exams for the Fellowship of the Royal College of Surgeons (FRCS).

Sheldon returned to Sydney and took up position of head of Upper Gastro-Intestinal Surgery in 1986. During his time as head of the department he pioneered techniques and introduced services for total parenteral nutrition, mucosal grafts and balloon dilatations for common bile duct stenosis, as well as introducing laparoscopic methods for cholecystectomy.

Other surgical roles included Chairman of the Division of Surgery of the New South Wales Masonic Hospital (later becoming the New South Wales Private Hospital).

== Surgical accomplishments ==
Whilst still a surgical registrar and at the time being placed in thoracic surgery, Sheldon led a team of thoracic surgeons to Port Moresby in Papua New Guinea under Dr Rowan Nicks.

Sheldon worked with the Royal Flying Doctor Service at Broken Hill throughout his career and would often be flying remotely in an old Drover airplane. He continued to provide locum doctor services to under-serviced regions including in Darwin where at times he was the only surgeon available.

Sheldon headed the 3rd Australian Surgical Aid Team that was invited by the Australian Government to provide surgical services in Vung Tau, located in South Vietnam. He led an experienced group of volunteer doctors including nurses, radiographers, surgeons, an anesthetist, a physical, and an intern. In a demonstration of surgical success, he delivered Siamese twins whilst volunteering there.

He did further travels as visiting lecturer in Indonesia and the Philippines throughout his career.

Sheldon was a pioneer of many successful techniques mentioned before. He harvested the kidneys for the first renal transplant performed at Royal Prince Alfred Hospital with Dr James May.

== Other roles ==
Sheldon joined the 13th NSW National Service Battalion as a private soldier during his study at the University of Sydney.

Sheldon was involved in research and also had a passion for teaching and continued his professional development with his role as both a tutor and examiner for the University of Sydney Medical School.

He was involved with medic-legal matters and had a role with the Abbot committee and committee for the law of negligence into medical indemnity. He served as Chairman of the Council of Procedural Specialists as part of this role beginning in 1993.

== Awards ==
Throughout his life, Sheldon was awarded many accolades.

He received the Justin Fleming Gold Medal from the Australia Association of Surgeons for his research and publications. Early in his career he received the Gordon Taylor Prize as the best candidate from Australia and New Zealand in the Primary Surgical Fellowship Exam. He was awarded the Vietnam Logistics and Support medal in 1995 for his service and work in South Vietnam. He was awarded the Graham Copland lecture and medal of the Royal Australasian College of Surgeons in 1996 and further the Active Service medal in 1997.

He received the ESR Hughes Medal for his services to the Royal Australasian College of Surgeons.

He had roles as both a councilman and chairman of the board of continuing professional development attributed to his teaching roles with the University of Sydney.

== Personal life ==
Sheldon was born in Dulwich Hill, Sydney on 5 January 1937 to Margaret and Mervyn Sheldon. He was the third of four children to his parents. Sheldon came from an education focused family with his mother being a schoolteacher and his father being head of Biology and Vice Principal at Sydney Teachers' College.
