= Joyce Richardson =

New Zealand / Australian paleontologist

- Born: Joyce Ravina Richards; 14 July 1923; New Zealand
- Died: 13 October 2019 (aged 96)
- Education: University of Melbourne
- Scientific career
- Fields: Palaeontology
- Workplaces: National Museum of Victoria; New Zealand Oceanographic Institute
- Thesis: The cainozoic terebratuloid and terebratelloid brachiopoda of Australia (1958)

Joyce Ravina Richardson (née Richards; 14 July 1923 – 13 October 2019) was a New Zealand palaeontologist. She specialised in the study of brachiopods in both New Zealand and Australia.

== Biography ==
Richardson was born Joyce Ravina Richards in New Zealand on 14 July 1923. She studied zoology at the University of Otago and won the Parker Memorial Prize in 1945. She graduated with a Bachelor of Arts degree in 1946, and a Master of Arts degree in 1949.

In early 1949, she moved to Australia to take up a position at the University of Melbourne. She completed a PhD there in 1958 for her thesis, The cainozoic terebratuloid and terebratelloid brachiopoda of Australia.

She subsequently worked for the National Museum of Victoria, before returning to New Zealand to take up a position at the New Zealand Oceanographic Institute. In 1977, Richardson won a grant from National Geographic to undertake an expedition to study brachiopods in the waters surrounding Stewart Island. The team included divers and oceanographers, and spent eight days aboard the 76-foot Acheron. Specimens collected were provided to the Smithsonian Institution and other museums.

Following her retirement, Richardson returned to Australia where she volunteered at the National Museum of Victoria and continued her work on brachiopods. She also served as honorary librarian for the Royal Society of Victoria.

In her 1987 paper, "Brachiopods from Carbonate Sands of the Australian Shelf", Richardson described three new genera, Anakinetica, Aulites and Parakinetica, and two new species, Parakinetica stewartii and Magadinella mineuri. The last was named in honour of her colleague, Rudi Mineur.

Richardson was elected a Fellow of the Royal Society of Victoria in 2004. She died on 13 October 2019, at the age of 96.

== Selected publications ==
- J. R. Richardson (April 1981). "Distribution and orientation of six articulate brachiopod species from New Zealand". New Zealand Journal of Zoology. 8 (2): 189–196. doi:10.1080/03014223.1981.10427961. ISSN 0301-4223. Wikidata Q107392023.
- J. R. Richardson (April 1981). "Recent brachiopods from New Zealand — background to the study cruises of 1977–79". New Zealand Journal of Zoology. 8 (2): 133–143. doi:10.1080/03014223.1981.10427954. ISSN 0301-4223. Wikidata Q107391978.
- J. R. Richardson (March 1987). "Brachiopods from Carbonate Sands of the Australian Shelf". Proceedings of the Royal Society of Victoria, vol. 99, no. 1: 37–50.
- I. G. Jowett; J. Richardson (June 1996). "Distribution and abundance of freshwater fish in New Zealand rivers". New Zealand Journal of Marine and Freshwater Research. 30 (2): 239–255. doi:10.1080/00288330.1996.9516712. ISSN 0028-8330. Wikidata Q124819282.
