= Edward Ford (physician) =

Australian Army officer and physician

Sir Edward Ford OBE, FRACP, FRCP
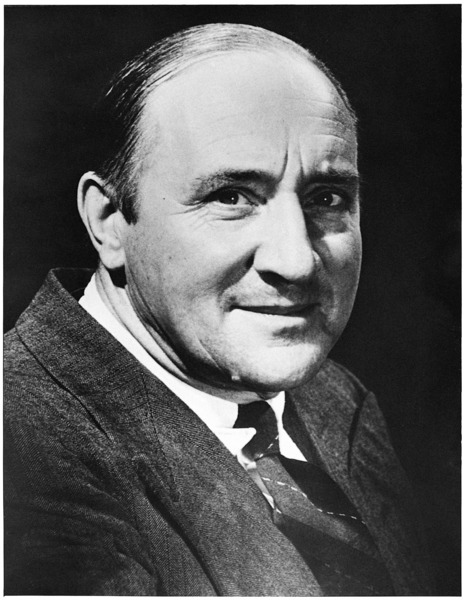

Dean of the Faculty of Medicine of the University of Sydney
- In office 1952–1957

Personal details
- Born: 15 April 1902 Bethanga, Victoria
- Died: 27 August 1986 (aged 84) Potts Point, New South Wales
- Education: University of Melbourne
- Occupation: Physician
- Civilian awards: Knight Bachelor
- Nickname: Ted

Military service
- Allegiance: Australia
- Branch/service: Australian Army
- Years of service: 1940–1964
- Rank: Colonel
- Unit: Australian Army Medical Corps
- Commands: 1st Mobile Bacteriological Laboratory
- Battles/wars: Second World War; Western Desert Campaign; New Guinea Campaign
- Military awards: Officer of the Order of the British Empire; Mentioned in Despatches
- Service number: NX445

Sir Edward Ford (15 April 1902 – 27 August 1986) was an Australian soldier, academic and physician. He played an important role in the anti-malaria campaign in the South West Pacific Area during the Second World War, and in preventative medicine in Australia after the war, but is best known for his Bibliography of Australian Medicine.

After the war, Ford wrote a thesis on malaria control in the South West Pacific, for which he was awarded his Doctor of Medicine (MD) degree by the University of Melbourne in 1946. He became Director of the School of Public Health and Tropical Medicine at the University of Sydney in 1946, and Professor of Preventive Medicine in 1947, concurrently holding these two positions until his 1968 retirement.

== Education and early life ==
Edward (Ted) Ford was born in Bethanga, Victoria, on 15 April 1902, the son of Edward John Knight Ford and his wife Mary Doxford, née Armstrong. His first job after leaving Clunes Higher Elementary School was as a telegraph boy at the Postmaster-General's Department (PMG), which he joined in April 1917, later working in its accounts branch. After he matriculated at the age of 24 he enrolled in an arts course at the University of Melbourne, but soon switched to medicine. He supported himself by continuing to work for the PMG by night. He graduated with his Bachelor of Medicine and Bachelor of Surgery (MBBS) degrees in 1932, and did his residency at Melbourne Hospital.

Ford became a lecturer in anatomy at the university in 1933, and became a senior lecturer in anatomy and histology in 1934. While there he met Frederic Wood Jones, who shared and encouraged a passion for books. Ford would later dedicate his Bibliography of Australian Medicine 1790–1900 to Jones. Ford became interested in physical anthropology, and later tropical medicine. He moved to Sydney, where he became a lecturer at the School of Public Health and Tropical Medicine at the University of Sydney, from which he obtained a Graduate Diploma in Tropical Medicine in 1938.

That year, he travelled to Papua where he conducted a study of sexually transmitted disease among the people of the Trobriand Islands, Goodenough Island and the D'Entrecasteaux Islands for the Papuan administration. When he returned to Australia in 1939, he became the Medical Officer in Charge of the Commonwealth Laboratory in Darwin.

== Military career ==
In June 1940, in the early months of the Second World War, Ford volunteered for service with the Second Australian Imperial Force and was commissioned as a major in the Australian Army Medical Corps, receiving the service number NX445. In March 1941 he was sent to the Middle East as commanding officer of the 1st Australian Mobile Bacteriological Laboratory, and was soon engaged in the diagnosis of a variety of hitherto uncertain diseases. In July 1941, Ford's unit moved to Syria, where it was attached to the 2/3rd Casualty Clearing Station, providing the latter with the diagnostic capabilities of a larger general hospital, of which none were available.

Ford returned to Australia in March 1942, and was promoted to lieutenant colonel in August. He was appointed Assistant Director of Pathology, I Corps and New Guinea Force. To combat the danger of dysentery, Ford had all available supplies of sulphaguanidine in Australia shipped up to New Guinea, where Australian forces were fighting a desperate campaign against the Japanese. This was a new drug that Neil Hamilton Fairley had tested in the Middle East, and found to be effective. An initial dose of 4g followed by 2g doses at four hourly intervals was found to rapidly relieve the symptoms and permit the sufferers to travel.

New Guinea had numerous tropical diseases that posed a threat to the health and fitness of the troops fighting there, but the biggest medical problem was malaria. In December Ford took his case to the Commander in Chief (and commander of New Guinea Force), General Sir Thomas Blamey. After being lectured by Ford for about an hour on the history and dangers of malaria, and what needed to be done, Blamey said: "I think I understand you, Colonel Ford. If I don't do these things, my troops will suffer." "What I have been trying to tell you, Sir," Ford replied, "is that if you don't do these things, you won't have any bloody troops to suffer."

Blamey liked officers who spoke to him like that. The effect was soon felt:

The over-night appearance of a growing labour force, the clearing up of the hitherto obscure delays in supplies, the provision of a special officer to speed on these vital items to their destination and the emphasis laid on personal responsibility of all ranks brought about welcome changes. Of great importance too was the recognition of the principle that patients suffering from malaria should be as far as possible retained for treatment in New Guinea, and not sent back to Australia.

Blamey even wrote an article on malaria in New Guinea Force's newspaper, Guinea Gold, in which he exhorted his men to take proper precautions against malaria. "Our worst enemy in New Guinea is not the Nip," he wrote, "it's the bite." Gradually, the incidence of the once epidemic disease began to drop. For his part, Ford was mentioned in despatches for "gallant and distinguished services".

In March 1943, Ford was appointed malariologist at Allied Land Forces Headquarters (LHQ) in Melbourne. Here he was charged with responsibility for co-ordinating the Army's overall effort against malaria. In March 1945, he became Director of Hygiene, Pathology and Entomology at LHQ, and in May he was promoted to colonel. For his services he was made an Officer of the Order of the British Empire (Military Division) on 19 July 1945 for his "skill, energy and initiative of a high order". He was transferred to the Reserve of Officers on 25 June 1946. After the war he served in the part-time Citizen Military Forces, and was Director of Army Health from 1953 to 1964.

== Academia ==
After the war, Ford wrote a thesis on malaria control in the South West Pacific, for which he was awarded his Doctor of Medicine (MD) degree by the University of Melbourne in 1946. He received a Rockefeller Fellowship that allowed him to study at the London School of Hygiene and Tropical Medicine, where he gained a Diploma of Public Health with distinction in 1947. Ford became Director of the School of Public Health and Tropical Medicine at the University of Sydney in 1946, and Professor of Preventive Medicine in 1947, concurrently holding these two positions until his 1968 retirement. In addition, he was the Dean of the Faculty of Medicine and a Fellow of the Senate from 1953 to 1957, and was Acting Vice-Chancellor of the University of Sydney from November 1960 until March 1961. He was involved in the establishment of the medical school at the University of Western Australia, and was a member of the council of Macquarie University.

His wartime Army service was recognised in 1946 by his appointment as a fellow of the Royal Australasian College of Physicians (RACP) in 1946. He later served as its vice-president from 1970 to 1972. He became a fellow of the Royal College of Physicians (RCP) in London in 1958, and also of the Royal Australian College of Medical Administrators, the Zoological Society, London, and the Royal Sanitary Institute, London. He was made an honorary fellow of the Royal College of Pathologists of Australia in 1971, and of the Royal Australian Historical Society in 1957. On 1 January 1960, he was created a knight bachelor. In 1969 the RCP and the RACP awarded him the Neil Hamilton Fairley medal, and he was granted an honorary Doctor of Letters by the University of Sydney in 1971.

Ford collected books, and he was a curator of the RACP library from 1958 until his death in 1986. He donated some 2,200 items to the library. Today other books from his collection can be found in the libraries of La Trobe University, Macquarie University and the University of Sydney, where the Burkitt-Ford library is named in his honour. In 1976, he published his Bibliography of Australian Medicine 1790–1900. Benedetto ("Ben") Haneman predicted that this work would be "one reason Ford's name will be permanently recalled in any study of the historiography of Australian medicine." Ford, who never married, died at his home in Potts Point, New South Wales, on 27 August 1986 and was cremated. Some of his papers are in the Mitchell Library in Sydney, while others can be found in the National Archives of Australia in Sydney.
