= Gustav Nossal =

Australian research biologist (born 1931)

Sir Gustav Nossal AC CBE FRS FAA FTSE
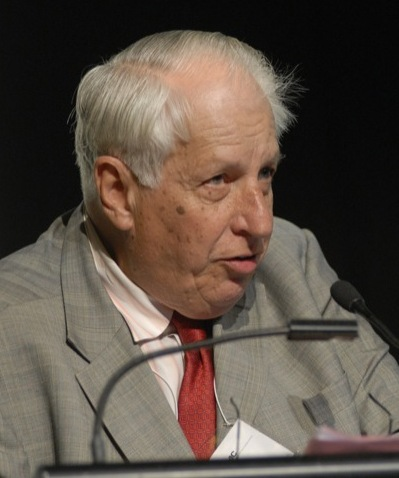
- Nossal at the 5th World Conference of Science Journalists in 2007
- Born: Gustav Victor Joseph Nossal; 4 June 1931 (age 95); Bad Ischl, Austria
- Citizenship: Austria (until 1938), Australia (1938 onwards)
- Education: University of Sydney (BSc), University of Melbourne (PhD)
- Known for: His contributions to the fields of antibody formation and immunological tolerance
- Awards: Albert Einstein World Award of Science (1990)
- Scientific career
- Fields: Immunology
- Workplaces: The Walter and Eliza Hall Institute of Medical Research, Melbourne
- Doctoral students: Michael F. Good

Sir Gustav Victor Joseph Nossal (born 4 June 1931) is an Austrian-born Australian research biologist. He is famous for his contributions to the fields of antibody formation and immunological tolerance.

== Early life and education ==
Nossal's family was from Vienna, Austria to a non-religious family of Ashkenazi Jewish extract. He was born four weeks prematurely in Bad Ischl while his mother was on holiday. His family left their home town of Vienna for Australia in 1939 following Nazi Germany's annexation of Austria. Through his grandparents, he had patrilineal Austrian-Jewish ancestry so he was considered Jewish, he was at risk of being sent to concentration camps. In an interview with Adam Spencer, Nossal noted that his father was not a practicing Jew but his ethnicity (Ashkenazi Jewish) made him as such, even though he had been baptised a Roman Catholic as a child. Nossal remarked that his father "therefore thought that he would be somewhat protected from the Holocaust-type predicament. Of course, he hadn't properly read Mein Kampf. It was all spelt out there: if your four grandparents were Jewish, then you were Jewish." He was baptised and remains a practising Roman Catholic.

Nossal showed interest in medicine and wanted to become a doctor since the age of seven. When he first attended school in Australia, Nossal spoke no English but he graduated from St Aloysius' College in 1947 as the dux of the college. In 1948, he entered the Sydney Medical School, graduating later with first-class honours from the University of Sydney. At the age of 26, he left his job in Sydney and moved to Melbourne to work with Macfarlane Burnet in medical science at the Walter and Eliza Hall Institute of Medical Research and gained his PhD degree at the University of Melbourne in 1960.

== Religious beliefs ==
On describing his views on religion Nossal said:

For me, a large part of that is a tremendously strong identification with the mission of the Church. An instinct for justice is central to that mission and central to being a Catholic[...] Science deals with fundamentally repeatable, objective, verifiable observations. It deals with hypotheses of which you can at least say "this is not patently false." But the human experience, on the other hand, does not just deal with verifiable facts. The human experience has Shakespeare. It has Beethoven. It has Thomas Aquinas. There is no scientist alive who can tell me how the brain of Shakespeare differs from the brain of the worst scribbler for the tabloid press. This is not yet and may never be in the realm of science... We have to access this huge other area of human experience through other means. Call them the humanities. Theology, of course, is one of the great humanities. A human being struggling to understand the cosmos and to understand his or her own consciousness is not at all antipathetic or opposed to me struggling to understand how cells make antibody molecules.

—

== Career ==
Following the retirement of Macfarlane Burnet in 1965, at the age of 35 Nossal became director of Walter and Eliza Hall Institute of Medical Research, a position that he kept until 1996. In parallel, he was Professor of Medical Biology at the University of Melbourne. Nossal's research was in fundamental immunology, in the field of "antibody formation and immunological tolerance". He has written five books and 530 scientific articles in this and related fields.

Nossal has been President (1970-1973) of the 30,000-member world body of immunology, the International Union of Immunological Societies; President of the Australian Academy of Science (1994-1998); a member of the Prime Minister's Science, Engineering and Innovation Council (PMSEIC) (1989 to 1998); and Chairman of the Victorian Health Promotion Foundation (1987-1996). He has been chairman of the committee overseeing the World Health Organization's Vaccines and Biologicals Program (1993-2002) and Chairman of the Strategic Advisory Council of the Bill & Melinda Gates Foundation Children's Vaccine Program (1998-2003). He was Deputy Chairman of the Council for Aboriginal Reconciliation from 1998 to 2000. He was Chairman of the Advisory Committee of the Global Foundation, The purpose of the foundation was to "encourage Australia’s sustainable national development in a global context." Sir Gustav is a member of the Patrons Council of the Epilepsy Foundation of Victoria and of the advisory board of the Health Impact Fund.

== Personal life ==
Nossal is married to Lyn whom he met and later married on completion of his medical course at the University of Sydney. Together, they have four children and nine grandchildren.

== Awards and recognition ==
- 1964 - Royal Society of Victoria Medal for Excellence in Scientific Research
- 1967 – Fellow of the Australian Academy of Science (FAA)
- 1969 – Phi Beta Kappa Award in Science
- 1969 – SSI Honorary Member
- 1970 – Emil von Behring Prize
- 1970 – Commander of the Order of the British Empire (CBE) for his contribution to medical research
- 1977 – Knighted for his ground-breaking work in immunology
- 1979 – Macfarlane Burnet Medal and Lecture by the Australian Academy of Science
- 1980 – Foreign Fellow of the Indian National Science Academy
- 1981 – Fellow of the Australian Academy of Technological Sciences and Engineering (FTSE)
- 1982 – Awarded the ANZAAS Medal
- 1982 – Fellow of the Royal Society (FRS)
- 1982 – Rostrum Award of Merit, for excellence in the art of public speaking over a considerable period and his demonstration of an effective contribution to society through the spoken word
- 1983 – Honorary Fellow of the Royal Society of Edinburgh (HonFRSE)
- 1989 – Companion of the Order of Australia (AC) for his service to medicine, to science and to the community
- 1990 – Albert Einstein World Award of Science
- 1994 – James Cook Medal
- 1996 – Koch Gold Medal, the prize being awarded for prizes for major advances in biomedical sciences, particularly in the fields of microbiology and immunology.
- 1996 – Fellow of the Royal Society of Victoria (FRSV)
- 1997 – Listed as one of the 100 Australians identified as Australia's Living National Treasures
- 2000 – Australian of the Year
- 2001 – Centenary Medal for distinguished service to the study of antibody formation and immunological tolerance
- 2002 – Featured on an Australian postage stamp
- 2006 – Honorary member of the Monash University Golden Key Society
- 2007 – The Nossal Institute for Global Health at the University of Melbourne was named in honour of Nossal
- 2009 – Nossal High School, located at the then Berwick campus of Monash University, now the Berwick Campus of Federation University, was named in honour of Nossal
- 2010 – Inaugural Monash Medal as an Outstanding Australian for his contribution to the Australian community and beyond
- 2012 – Monash University Faculty of Medicine, Nursing and Health Sciences Lifetime Achievement Award
- Foreign Member of the Korean Academy of Science and Technology

== See also ==
- List of Australian of the Year Award recipients
