= Acacia imitans =

Gibson wattle

Conservation status
- Endangered (IUCN 3.1)

Scientific classification
- Kingdom: Plantae
- Clade: Embryophytes
- Clade: Tracheophytes
- Clade: Spermatophytes
- Clade: Angiosperms
- Clade: Eudicots
- Clade: Rosids
- Order: Fabales
- Family: Fabaceae
- Subfamily: Caesalpinioideae
- Clade: Mimosoid clade
- Genus: Acacia
- Species: A. imitans

Binomial name
- Acacia imitans Maslin
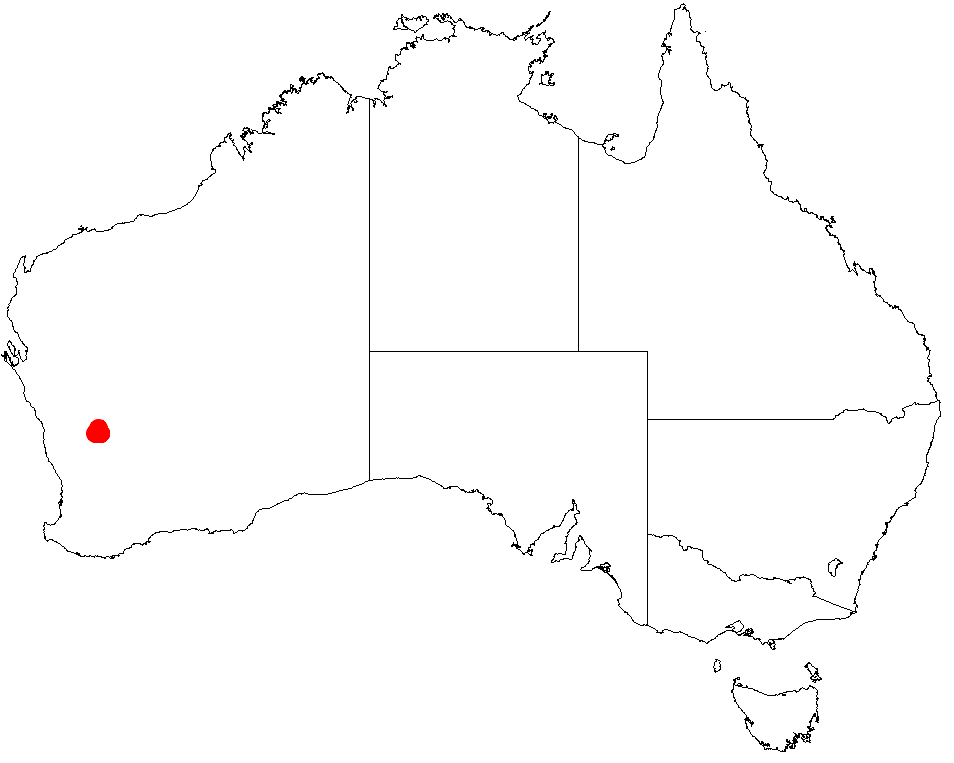
- Occurrence data from AVH

Synonyms
- Racosperma imitans (Maslin) Pedley

Species of legume

Acacia imitans, also commonly known as Gibson wattle, is a species of flowering plant in the family Fabaceae and is restricted to a small area of inland Western Australia. It is a low, dense, spreading, prickly shrub with asymmetically bow-shaped or widely elliptic phyllodes, oblong to short cylindrical heads of golden yellow flowers and tightly coiled, firmly papery pods.

== Description ==
Acacia imitans is a low, dense, spreading, semi-prostrate shrub that typically grows to a height of 0.3–1 m (1 ft 0 in – 3 ft 3 in) and 3 m (9.8 ft) wide. It has glabrous, grey branches and many short, straight, rigid spiny branchlets, often without phyllodes. The phyllodes are 3.5–7 mm (0.14–0.28 in) long and 1.5–2.5 mm (0.059–0.098 in) wide, asymmetric, bow-shaped or widely elliptic, the upper edge straight to slightly concave and the lower edge markedly concave, with an upturned point on the end. The flowers are golden yellow and borne in an oblong to shortly cylindrical head 6–8 mm (0.24–0.31 in) long and 4–5 mm (0.16–0.20 in) wide in axils, on a peduncle 3–4 mm (0.12–0.16 in) long. Flowering occurs in August to September, and the pods are tightly coiled, 7 mm (0.28 in) long unexpanded, firmly papery and glabrous. The seeds are oblong to oval, dull dark brown with a minute aril near the end.

== Taxonomy ==
Acacia imitans was first formally described in 1999 by Bruce Maslin in the journal Nuytsia from specimens collected by Basil Herbert Smith on Ningham Station in 1985. The specific epithet (imitans) refers to its superficial resemblance to A. kochii.

== Distribution and habitat ==
Gibson wattle grows on rocky hills in rocky red loamy soils on slopes in tall shrubland and is only known from six subpopulations in the area around Mount Singleton, about 300 km (190 mi) north east of Perth in the Yalgoo bioregion of inland Western Australia. Four of these subpopulations are found about Ningham Station and two at Mount Gibson Station. The total population is estimated at 550 mature plants.

== Conservation status ==
Acacia imitans is listed as "endangered" under the IUCN Red List and as "Priority Four" by the Government of Western Australia Department of Biodiversity, Conservation and Attractions, meaning that is rare or near threatened. It has an estimated area of occupancy of only 30 to 100 square kilometres, and is threatened by grazing from sheep and feral goats, inappropriate fire regimes, possible mining activities, and by climate change.

== See also ==
- List of Acacia species
