= Arvi Parbo =

Australian business executive (1926–2019)

Sir Arvi Parbo AC FTSE FRSV HonFAusIMM
- Born: Arvi Hillar Parbo; 1 February 1926; Tallinn, Estonia
- Died: 1 May 2019 (aged 93); Melbourne, Australia
- Occupations: business executive; company director
- Awards: Companion of the Order of Australia; Fellow of the Australian Academy of Technological Sciences and Engineering; Honorary Fellow of the Australasian Institute of Mining and Metallurgy

Sir Arvi Hillar Parbo (10 February 1926 – 1 May 2019) was a business executive who was concurrently chairman of three of Australia's largest companies, Alcoa World Alumina & Chemicals, Munich Re, and Zurich Australian Insurance.

== Early life ==
Parbo was born in Tallinn, Estonia and fled from his homeland ahead of the Soviet occupation in 1944, ending up in a refugee camp (DP camp) in Germany. After attending the Clausthal Mining Academy in Germany from 1946 to 1948 he migrated to Australia in 1949. He graduated from the University of Adelaide with a Bachelor of Engineering degree in 1955.

== Career ==
Parbo joined Western Mining Corporation in 1956 and over the next 12 years held the positions of Underground Surveyor, Underground Manager, Technical Assistant to the Managing Director, and Deputy General Superintendent. He was appointed General Manager in 1968 and became a Director in 1970. He was appointed Deputy Managing Director in 1971 and became Managing Director in the same year. In 1974, Parbo was appointed Chairman and Managing Director of Western Mining Corporation.

In 1977, the Arvi Parbo Medal was awarded to an engineering student from the University of Adelaide for the first time. As of 2017, the Sir Arvi Parbo Medal is awarded annually, in partnership with Engineers Australia.

In the 1978 New Year Honours, Parbo was appointed a Knight Bachelor for his service to industry.

In 1986, Parbo relinquished his managing director position at Western Mining Corporation and became the company's Executive Chairman. In 1990 he retired as an executive and was appointed non-executive chairman; he retired from this position in 1999.

Parbo was Chairman of Alcoa of Australia from 1978 to 1996, Chairman of Munich Reinsurance Company of Australia from 1984 to 1998 and Chairman of Zurich Australian Insurance group from 1985 to 1998. He was appointed a Director of the Alcoa from 1980 to 1998, Hoechst Australian Investments from 1981 to 1997, Chase AMP Bank from 1985 to 1991 and Sara Lee Corporation from 1991 to 1998. In 1987, Parbo was appointed a director of BHP and was appointed chairman in 1989 until retirement in 1992.

In June 1993 Parbo was appointed a Companion of the Order of Australia and had his portrait painted by the artist, William Dargie. The work is in the collection of the National Portrait Gallery in Canberra.

Parbo was a Fellow of the Australian Academy of Technological Sciences and Engineering (FTSE). He was the ATSE's president from 1995 to 1997. He was inducted Fellow of the Royal Society of Victoria (FRSV) in 1997. He was also granted an honorary fellowship of the Australasian Institute of Mining and Metallurgy in 1997.

Parbo died in Melbourne on 1 May 2019, aged 93.
