= Parakinetica =

Scientific classification
- Domain: Eukaryota
- Kingdom: Animalia
- Phylum: Brachiopoda
- Class: Rhynchonellata
- Order: Terebratulida
- Family: Terebratellidae
- Genus: Parakinetica; Richardson, 1987
- Species: P. stewartii

Binomial name
- Parakinetica stewartii Richardson, 1987

Genus of brachiopods

Parakinetica is a monotypic genus of brachiopods belonging to the family Terebratellidae. The only species is Parakinetica stewartii.

The species is found in Southern Australia.
