= Sandra Rees =

Australian neuroscientist

Professor Sandra Rees
- Citizenship: Australian
- Education: University of Sydney, University College, Monash University, University of Melbourne
- Scientific career
- Fields: Developmental Neurobiology

Professor Sandra Rees is an Honorary Professorial Fellow in the Department of Anatomy and Neuroscience at the University of Melbourne. Her major research interests have been directed towards understanding the pathogenesis of brain injury resulting from fetal hypoxia, infection, alcohol exposure, growth restriction and prematurity.

== Early life and education ==
Sandra Rees was born in Melbourne in 1942, and moved to Sydney in 1952 as her father, an Army officer, was appointed to the School of Military Engineering at Casula. She earned a Bachelor of Science with Honours in 1963 and Master of Science in 1965, both from the University of Sydney. During this time she studied the structure and function of the visual system in the Department of Physiology, chaired by Professor Peter Bishop.

In 1965 Rees received a Lady Leitch Scholarship for overseas study, and relocated to London to complete a Master of Philosophy at University College in 1968. She then returned to Melbourne to complete her Doctor of Philosophy at Monash University in 1977. Under the supervision of Dr Brian Cragg, Rees learned to perform electron microscopy to examine the ultrastructure of the normal and abnormal brain. It was from this work that she became particularly interested in brain development, and during her career she investigated the normal development of the somatosensory system and environmental factors that adversely affect the structural and functional development of the brain, such as hypoxia, infection, alcohol exposure and prematurity. In collaboration with neonatologists and obstetricians she devised clinically relevant animal models. She was also involved in trialing neuroprotective agents to ameliorate injury in the developing brain. For her contribution to the field of neurobiology and neurosciences, Rees was awarded a Doctor of Science from the University of Melbourne in 2011.

== Work ==
In 1984, Rees joined the Department of Physiology at Monash University where she carried out research until 1992. She then moved her laboratory to the University of Melbourne where she was promoted to Associate Professor in 1999, and Professor in 2007. Her expertise in teaching spans participation in a wide range of undergraduate courses and postgraduate research supervision. Prior to her appointment at the University of Melbourne she lectured and demonstrated in the department of physiology at the University of Sydney, University College, London University and Monash University in neurophysiology, neuroanatomy and brain development. At the University of Melbourne from 1992–2009 Rees taught undergraduate courses in neuroscience, histology, developmental neuroscience and cell biology and carried a full teaching load with convening responsibilities. She has had extensive experience on committees at the university, faculty and departmental levels, serving on academic boards, equity and staff development committees and various selection committees for student and career interruption scholarships, as well as leadership programs for women. She has been actively involved in mentoring young scientists, and has participated in women's mentoring programs, leadership courses and has given invited presentations to talk about women in research. Her laboratory has collaborated with research groups at Monash University, INSERM U676 Paris, France and Washington, Harvard and Oxford Universities. She has given plenary lectures at international meetings, regularly reviews papers for neuroscience journals and grants for national and international bodies. She has been the Victorian representative on the Council of the Australian Neuroscience Society (1992–95), an examiner for the Royal Australian College of Ophthalmologists (1997-2003), the Royal Australian and NZ College of Obstetrics and Gynaecology (1999-2001). She has authored 140 papers in international journals, written 5 reviews and 8 book chapters and supervised 13 PhD students.

== Personal ==
Rees still maintains strong links with science. She was the Chair of the Science Programs Committee of the Council of the Royal Society of Victoria until 2017 and maintains her involvement in the Society's events. She also volunteers on the science program 'The Uncertainty Principal' on Vision Australia Radio and is on the board of directors of Life's Little Treasures Foundation, a charity for children born sick or premature.

== Awards and honors ==
2019 Royal Society of Victoria - Inducted as a Fellow of the Royal Society of Victoria "for outstanding contributions to science and the Australian science community"

2008 Nina Kondelos Award – Australian Neuroscience Society for outstanding contribution to neuroscience

2004 Australian Academy of Science – Scientific Visits to Europe Award

1993 Award from Italian Science Foundation and Catholic University of Rome

1991 Ian Potter Foundation Travel Award, Vice Chancellor's Foundation Travel Award, Medical Faculty Travel Award

1988 Ian Potter Foundation Travel Award, Trust Fund of Australia Travel Award

1974 – 1977 Commonwealth Scholarship for Ph.D. candidature

1965 – 1966 Lady Leitch Scholarship for overseas study, Victorian Women's Graduates Association
