= Edgar Ritchie (engineer) =

Australian hydraulic engineer (1871–1956)

Edgar Gowar Ritchie
- Born: 15 July 1871; Kew, Victoria, Australia
- Died: 23 July 1956 (aged 85); St Kilda East, Victoria, Australia
- Occupation: hydraulic engineer
- Years active: 1891–1936
- Employer: Melbourne & Metropolitan Board of Works
- Spouse: Bertha Rees (1914)

Edgar Gowar Ritchie (15 July 1871 – 23 July 1956) was an Australian hydraulic engineer who worked for the Melbourne & Metropolitan Board of Works for the majority of his career. He was the engineer of water supply from 1908 until his retirement in 1936. In this role he was responsible for the construction of the Maroondah, O'Shannassy and Silvan reservoirs and their associated aqueducts. In 1943, Ritchie was awarded the Peter Nicol Russell Memorial Medal from the Institution of Engineers Australia.

== Personal and death ==
Ritchie married botanist and lecturer Bertha Rees in September 1914. He died on 23 July 1956.
