= Lynne Selwood =

Australian reproductive biologist (marsupials)

Lynne Selwood AO
- Born: Lynette Bedford

Academic background
- Education: University of Sydney
- Thesis: Oogenesis in the chiton Sypharochiton septentriones (Mollusca, Polyplacophora) (1967)

Lynne Selwood AO FRSV (née Bedford) is an Australian reproductive biologist whose work focuses on marsupials. In 2010, she began a three-year term as the first woman president of the Royal Society of Victoria.

== Education and career ==
Selwood was educated at the University of Sydney, graduating with a BSc in 1960 and an MSc in 1963 for her thesis "Histological and cytochemical studies on development in Bembicium nanum (Lamarck) (Gastropoda Littorinidae)". She then completed a PhD on "Oogenesis in the chiton Sypharochiton septentriones (Mollusca, Polyplacophora)" in 1967. She worked as a post-doctoral researcher at the University of New South Wales from 1967 to 1970 before moving to London from 1972 to 1974.

Back in Australia from 1974, Selwood has teaching and research positions at Monash University and La Trobe University. She has been at the University of Melbourne where, as of 2022 she is an honorary professor.

Selwood was a member of the Council of the Royal Society of Victoria and, in 2010, was the first woman to be elected president since its inauguration in 1854. As of 2022 she serves as a trustee of the Society.

Annoyed that possums were eating her garden, Selwood developed a spray which, with assistance from the University of Melbourne, was patented and commercialised and is produced and sold as Yates Possum Repellent Spray.

== Honours and recognition ==
Selwood was appointed an Officer of the Order of Australia in the 2017 Queen's Birthday Honours. She was elected a Fellow of the Royal Society of Victoria in 2018. She received the Ellis Troughton Memorial Award in 2018 from the Australian Mammal Society for her lifetime of mammalian research and is an honorary life member of the Society.
