= Terence O'Brien (botanist) =

Australian botanist (1937–2016)

- Terence Phillip O'Brien
- Born: 12 January 1937
- Died: 4 July 2016 (aged 79)

Terence 'Terry' Phillip O'Brien (12 January 1937 – 4 July 2016) was an Australian botanist who was an expert in the development of wheat, and who was an early pioneer of Australian eco-tourism.

== Life ==
O'Brien completed a bachelor's degree in Agricultural Science and a Master of Science from the University of Melbourne in 1962. He studied at Harvard University, and was the first Australian appointed to the Harvard Society of Fellows as a junior fellow between 1964 and 1967, and completed a PhD.

After returning to Australia was employed as a senior lecturer at Monash University between 1967 and 1970. In 1970 he was appointed as a Reader in Botany at the same university, and established an electron microscope at the University, and the Plant Cell Biology Laboratory. He received a Doctor of Science from Monash University in 1978, for his contributions to understanding the physiological anatomy of plant cells and tissues. From July 1986 to June 1987, O'Brien was elected president of the Royal Society of Victoria. He also was a chartered biologist of the Royal Society of Biology, and a member of the Australian Institute of Biology.

After assisting the university to introduce Australia's first postgraduate degree in tourism studies in 1989, O'Brien resigned from Monash University to found an eco-tourism company himself. He eventually moved back to his alma mater of Harvard University before retiring.

== Botanical legacy ==
O'Brien specialised in the study of the development and structure of wheat, and plant morphology more broadly. Publications he contributed to include:

- TP O'Brien and ME McCully. 1969. Plant structure and development: a pictorial and physiological approach. (New York: Macmillan.)
- SY Zee and TP O'Brien. 1970. "A Special Type of Tracheary Element Associated with "Xylem Discontinuity" in the Floral Axis of Wheat." Australian Journal of Biological Sciences 23(4) 783 - 792.
- JG Swift and TP O'Brien. 1970. "Vascularization of the scutellum of wheat." Australian Journal of Botany 18(1) 45 - 53.
- JG Swift and TP O'Brien. 1971. "Vascular differentiation in the wheat embryo." Australian Journal of Botany 19(1) 63 - 71.
- TP O'Brien, RL Clark, and PF Lumley. 1972. Manual of techniques in plant histology. (Clayton, Vic.: Monash University. Botany Department.)
- TP O'Brien and J Kuo. 1975. "Development of the Suberized Lamella in the Mestome Sheath of Wheat Leaves." Australian Journal of Botany 23(5) 783 - 794.
- S Craig and TP O'Brien. 1975. "The Lodicules of Wheat: Pre- and Post-Anthesis." Australian Journal of Botany 23(3) 451 - 458.
- CH Busby and TP O'Brien. 1979. "Aspects of Vascular Anatomy and Differentiation of Vascular Tissues and Transfer Cells in Vegetative Nodes of Wheat." Australian Journal of Botany 27(6) 703 - 711.
- TP O'Brien and ME McCully. 1981. The study of plant structure: principles and selected methods. (Melbourne: Termarcarphi.)
- TP O'Brien. 1986. Plants, insects and fire in the Big Desert. [videorecording]. (Clayton, Vic.: Educational Technology Section, Monash University.)

Specimens collected by O'Brien during his career at Monash University are now cared for by the National Herbarium of Victoria, Royal Botanic Gardens Victoria.
