= Russ Kelly =

Russell Kelly
- Full name: Russell Lindsay Frederick Kelly
- Born: 25 November 1909 Murwillumbah, NSW, Australia
- Died: 25 December 1943 (aged 34) Concord West, NSW, Australia

Rugby union career
- Position: Back-row
International career
Years	Team	Apps	(Points)
1936–38	Australia	7	(2)

Russell Lindsay Frederick Kelly (25 November 1909 — 25 December 1943) was an Australian rugby union international.

Born in Murwillumbah, Kelly was educated at Canterbury Boys' High School, where he learnt his rugby.

Kelly, a back-row forward, debuted in Sydney first-grade rugby in 1931 with Northern Suburbs, but spent the majority of his career at Drummoyne. Between 1933 and 1939, Kelly was a regular New South Wales representative, with 28 appearances. He was capped seven times for the Wallabies from 1936 to 1938, debuting on a tour of New Zealand.

Enlisting in 1940, Kelly served in World War II with an anti-tank regiment and attained the rank of sergeant. While trapped with his unit in fighting near Tobruk, he was struck by machine gun fire, which shattered most of his ribs. He was held by Italian forces as a prisoner of war in Benghazi and was later moved to a Naples hospital. In July, 1943, Kelly was repatriated in a prisoner exchange and died five months later while undergoing an operation for his injuries in Sydney.

== See also ==
- List of Australia national rugby union players
