= Anakinetica =

Scientific classification
- Domain: Eukaryota
- Kingdom: Animalia
- Phylum: Brachiopoda
- Class: Rhynchonellata
- Order: Terebratulida
- Family: Terebratellidae
- Genus: Anakinetica; Richardson, 1987

Genus of brachiopods

Anakinetica is a genus of brachiopods belonging to the family Terebratellidae.

The species of this genus are found in Australia.

Species:

- Anakinetica cumingi (Davidson, 1852)
- Anakinetica recta Richardson, 1991
