= Richard Pescott =

Australian botanist (1905–1986)

Richard Thomas Martin Pescott (21 August 1905 – 22 February 1986) was an Australian botanist. Pescott was Director of the National Museum of Victoria from 1944 to 1957, and then Director of the Royal Botanic Gardens, Melbourne until his retirement in 1970. He was President of the Royal Society of Victoria from 1963 to 64. He was the nephew of the Australian naturalist Edward Edgar Pescott.

== Works ==
- W. R. Guilfoyle, 1840-1912: The Master of Landscaping, Oxford University Press, Melbourne, 1974. ISBN 0-19-550454-2.
- The Royal Botanic Gardens, Melbourne: a history from 1845 to 1970, Oxford University Press, Melbourne, 1982.
- "The Australian Gardening Book" (1991)
- "Companion Planting Guide to the Australian Gardening Book" (1991)
