= John M. Green =

Australian businessman, thriller writer and philanthropist

John M. Green (born 1953) is an Australian businessman, thriller writer, and philanthropist.

Green has held various leadership roles throughout his career. He previously served as an executive director at an investment bank and was a partner in two law firms. Additionally, he held a director position at the publishing house UNSW Press before co-founding Pantera Press, which published his first novel, Nowhere Man.

Green has also contributed to publications including The Australian Financial Review and The Australian. As of July 2022, he served as deputy board chairman of global insurance firm QBE Insurance and held the position of councillor of the National Library of Australia.

== Personal life ==
Green resides in Sydney. He and his wife, Jenny Green, a sculptor were jointly recognized with UNSW Alumni Achievement Awards in 2016 for their contributions to the arts and cultural sector.

== Pantera Press ==
Pantera Press, a book publishing company co-founded by Green and his daughter Alison Green in 2008, has received recognition for its contributions to the industry. The press released its inaugural titles in 2010 and has since published works by authors including Sulari Gentill.

Pantera Press has established partnerships with various charitable organizations and was shortlisted for the Small Publisher of the Year award by the Australian Publishers Association in 2013. Additionally, Alison Green, in recognition of Pantera Press's focus on combining business with social responsibility, received the Westpac/Australian Financial Review 100 Women of Influence Award in 2016.

Pantera Press was sold to Hardie Grant Media in 2024.

== Corporate career ==
Green served as deputy board chairman of global insurance firm, QBE Insurance, a member of the Australian Institute of Company Directors corporate governance committee until May 2022, and currently remains a director of Pantera Press, the publishing company he co-founded.

He has also held board positions with organizations like WorleyParsons, a global professional services firm, UNSW Press, a book publisher, and the National Library of Australia.

His career has included roles as a member of the Australian Institute of Company Directors Corporate Governance Committee, the Australian Takeovers Panel, and (as mentioned in his novel The Tao Deception) the Australian Centre for Independent Studies (a Libertarian think tank) as of 2016. His earlier career included roles as an investment banker, an executive director at Macquarie Group, and a partner in two law firms (now known as Ashurst LLP and Herbert Smith Freehills).

== Student life ==
Green, a graduate of the University of New South Wales (UNSW) Law School, actively participated in student life. In 1974, he was elected full-time president of the University of New South Wales Student Union (now Arc @ UNSW Limited). He was also a member of the University of New South Wales Council, a president of the UNSW Jazz Society and a vice-president of the UNSW Law Society.

At Canterbury Boys' High School, Green was editor of the student newspaper, Graffiti, and was a promoter and booking agent for pop and rock bands.

== Books ==
- Nowhere Man (2010)
- Born to Run (2011)
- The Trusted (2013)
- The Tao Deception (2016)
- Double Deal (2021)
