= Ben Haneman =

Australian physician and book collector

- Born: Benedetto Haneman; 13 February 1923; Florence, Italy
- Died: 18 December 2001 (aged 78); Darlinghurst, New South Wales, Australia
- Occupations: Gastroenterologist, book collector
- Spouses: Marion Salkow; Beryl Thompson
- Children: 2

Ben Haneman (13 February 1923 – 18 December 2001) was an Australian physician and book collector.

== Early life and medical career ==
Ben Haneman was born Benedetto Haneman in Florence, Italy on 13 February 1923. His parents were Nathan and Amulka Haneman.

The family migrated to Australia when he was four. He attended Canterbury Boys' High School and then the University of Sydney where he graduated in medicine. Having received his medical registration in 1944, he began working as a general practitioner in the Sydney suburb of Carlton. Fifteen years later he passed the Royal Australasian College of Physicians examination and became a consultant doctor specialising in gastroenterology at St. George Hospital in Kogarah. He later became warden in clinical studies at the same hospital and was a "mentor" to generations of medical students. In 1971, he became a Fellow of the Royal Australasian College of Physicians. He was a long-time member of the Doctors Reform Society of Australia.

He was interested in the history of medicine and became the Australian president of the History of Medicine Society. Over the years contributed to many journals, magazines and newspapers including Australian Doctor, Medical Observer, RACP News, The Jewish News, the Australian Book Collector and Biblionews.

== Book collecting ==
Hanemann was a bibliophile who gathered together a "huge" and "eclectic" private library, comprising around 15,000 volumes and which included collections of books on Spanish literature, history and culture, on the history of science, biography and on Jewish culture.

He had a passion for Spain that dated from his early years when he had learned to speak Spanish, and over a period of 30 years he collected 1,100 copies of Miguel de Cervantes' literary masterpiece Don Quixote in 39 languages, both in the original Spanish and in "every ... significant English translation", as well as a number of illustrated editions of the novel, together with another thousand works on Cervantes. Haneman described what Don Quixote meant to him in the following words: "Don Quixote is central to Spanish literature, to world literature, to writing, production and reading of books and, in my fevered belief, is central to living and being." In 1997, he donated his Cervantes collection to the State Library of New South Wales where is it currently displayed on bookshelves lining the walls of the Library's Friends Room.

== Public service ==
Haneman was a committed member of the Jewish community in Australia and served both as the "chairman of the Social Justice Committee of the Jewish Board of Deputies" and as a "member of the Great Synagogue Library Committee" in Sydney.

He was a supporter of the Spanish community in Australia, and was a long-standing member of the Hispanic Society and the Spanish Cultural Society. He was an honorary professor in the Faculty of Medicine in the University of Navarra in Pamplona, Spain.

During his retirement he worked as a volunteer helper in the State Library of New South Wales.

== Awards and honours ==
- 1984: Knight (Caballero) of the Orden del Mérito Civil (Spain)
- 1988: Member - General Division (AM) of the Order of Australia - "for service to medicine and to the Spanish community"

== Ben Haneman Memorial Lecture ==
The biennial Ben Haneman Memorial Lecture is presented jointly by the Australian and New Zealand Society of the History of Medicine and the State Library of New South Wales.

The Ben Haneman Memorial Student Prize was awarded annually by the Australian and New Zealand Society of the History of Medicine (ANZSHM) for the best student research essay in the history of medicine. In 2018 the Prize was discontinued in order to bolster the Ben Haneman Memorial Postgraduate Student Conference Grants, a travel grants programme.

== Personal life ==
Haneman was married twice. His first wife was Marion Salkow, with who he had two sons, David and Peter. His second wife was Beryl Thompson.

He died on 18 December 2001 in Darlinghurst, New South Wales following a fall the day before in the State Library. He was survived by his two sons, his two daughters-in-law and his four grandchildren.
