= Edward John White =

Edward John White (8 December 1831 – 2 August 1913) was an English-born meteorologist and astronomer, president of the Royal Society of Victoria in 1902.

White was born in Bristol, England. From approximately 1853 to 160 he worked the Bendigo goldfields. He was acting Victorian Government Astronomer 1875-76 and an assistant to Robert L. J. Ellery at the Melbourne Observatory 1860 to 1892.

White was a Fellow of the Royal Society of Victoria (president 1902) and a Fellow of the Royal Astronomical Society

== Publications ==
- Remarks on some new tables for finding height by the barometer. Royal Society of Victoria. Proceedings., 2 (1889), 68-77.
- Monthly record of results of observations in meteorological, terrestrial magnetism, etc. etc., taken at the Melbourne Observatory during... together with abstracts from meteorological observations obtained at various localities in Victoria. (Compilation of monthly reports, May 1875-March 1876). Melbourne: Government Printer, 1875-76.
