= John Francis Lovering =

Australian geologist (1930–2023)

Chevalier John Francis Lovering AO FAA FTSE (27 March 1930 – 4 January 2023) was an Australian geologist. He was Professor of Geology at the University of Melbourne from 1969 to 1987 and Vice-Chancellor of Flinders University from 1987 to 1995.

== Background ==
Lovering attended the selective state Canterbury Boys' High School in south-west Sydney. He reported his family could not afford to send him to university and he received support from a 'cadetship' in mineralogy and petrology awarded by the Australian Museum. He held a BSc (Hons) and MSc in geology from the University of Sydney (1951, 1953), and a PhD from the Division of Geological Sciences, California Institute of Technology (1960). He took a second MSc in 1971 while at the University of Melbourne.

Lovering worked at the Australian Museum in Sydney while studying, from 1951 to 1955. His first major post was Research Fellow and then Senior Fellow in Geophysics and Geochemistry at the recently founded department at the Australian National University from 1960 to 1969. He became Professor of Geology, with a specialization in petrology, at the University of Melbourne in 1969, when aged only 39. As Head of the School of Earth Sciences he expanded teaching and research. He served as Dean of the Faculty of Science from 1983 to 1985 and was Deputy Vice-Chancellor (Research) from 1985 to 1987. He was also elected President of the Royal Society of Victoria for the term 1977-78.

Lovering retired from the University of Melbourne in 1987 at age 57, to move to Adelaide as Vice Chancellor of Flinders University. He had to oversee the university's response to the Dawkins reforms, which saw amalgamations with colleges and institutes, and student fees re-introduced in Australia. He also expanded the university's faculty structure.

At the end of his term in 1995 he returned to live and work in Melbourne, and became Professorial Fellow of Earth Sciences at the University of Melbourne (from 1999), performing several roles for the university and further afield (e.g. Chairman of the Environment Conservation Council, 1998; President of the Murray Darling Basin Commission). His final role was chair of the academic committee of the university's Office for Environmental Programs (until 2015), which established a student scholarship in his name.

Lovering was married to Kerry Lovering OAM, had three children, and lived in the Melbourne suburb of Kew and Port Melbourne. He died on 4 January 2023, at the age of 92.

== Scientific contributions ==
Lovering's early interest was in hard rock geology, then stratigraphy (Masters: Triassic rocks around the Sydney Basin). His PhD was on trace element studies of iron meteorites, identifying gallium and germanium through emission spectrography. Findings were that iron meteorites came from a common source. At ANU he used electron microprobes to analyse micron or micrometre sized particles in rocks or meteorites, to determine mineral chemical composition. This led to winning a competition to attend the live studio and comment on the Apollo 11 mission as a geologist. Lovering was involved to the end of the Apollo missions and attended the Apollo 17 blastoff.

Analysis of lunar rock revealed basalt with ilmenite and titanium minerals. Lovering's Australian research group were the first to identify the structure of a mineral never found on Earth, naming it tranquillityite. (the mineral was later discovered in Australia in 2011)

Lovering made two expeditions to Antarctica to examine the geology for the Australian Antarctic Division, and established Antarctic science research at the University of Melbourne.

His most-cited work concerns fission track analysis of apatite.

== Honours ==
- Fellow of the Australian Academy of Science (FAA) (1982)
- Fellow of the Australian Academy of Technological Sciences and Engineering (FTSE) (1993)
- Officer of the Order of Australia (AO) (1993)
- Honorary DSc, Flinders University (1995)
- Honorary DSc, University of Melbourne (1999)
- Fellow of the Royal Society of Victoria (FRSV) (2002)
