= Canterbury Boys' High School =

Public, single-sex school in New South Wales, Australia

Location
- Canterbury, New South Wales; Australia; 33°54′15″S 151°7′25″E

Information
- Type: Public, single-sex, secondary, day school
- Motto: Truth and Honour
- Established: 1918
- Principal: Ross Dummett
- Enrolment: ~466 (7–12)
- Campus: Suburban
- Colours: Navy blue, gold and red
- Website: canterburb-h.schools.nsw.gov.au

Canterbury Boys' High School (CBHS) is a public secondary day school for boys located in Canterbury, a south-western suburb of Sydney, New South Wales, Australia. It is near the Canterbury Park Racecourse and about 200 metres north of Canterbury Girls' High School.

Established in January 1918 as the Canterbury Intermediate High School, Canterbury Boys' High School is part of the St. George Region of high schools, and currently enrols around 470 students from Years 7 to 12. Almost 90 per cent of the students at Canterbury Boys come from a non-English-speaking background.

== History ==
Canterbury Boys' High School traces its origins back to 1917, when a deputation from the local Primary School's Parent and Citizens Association asked the Minister for Education to open a high school in the district. There was a concern that the demand for places in local High Schools would exceed available places, and as a result of this request, the Department decided to establish the school at Canterbury.

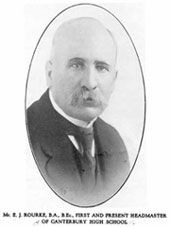
Ernest John Rourke B.A. first Principal of CBHS

The school was opened in January 1918, in what is now the Primary School buildings, and began operating with two classes and 72 students, with Ernest John Rourke B.A. as Headmaster. The school was initially an intermediate high school (1st to 3rd year), and was therefore named Canterbury Intermediate High School. At its foundation, the search had already begun for a more appropriate site for the new school.

In 1919 the land on which most of the original part of the school now stands was resumed, and plans for the new school were prepared. A section of the resumed land is historic, forming part of a 100-acre (0.40 km^{2}) grant made by the Rev. Richard Johnson on 20 May 1793. This farm was called "Canterbury Vale", and it was from this that the suburb of Canterbury and the school is named. Plans for the new building were completed in late December 1923, and a tender for £22,000 (A$44,000) was accepted in May 1924. The building was completed and occupied in July 1925 and officially opened on 1 August of that year.

The building was soon overcrowded due to the rapid growth of population in the area served by the school, and so plans for extensions were started. Further land acquisitions occurred in 1929 and 1931, and in 1933 the extensions to the northern and southern wings of the original building were completed.

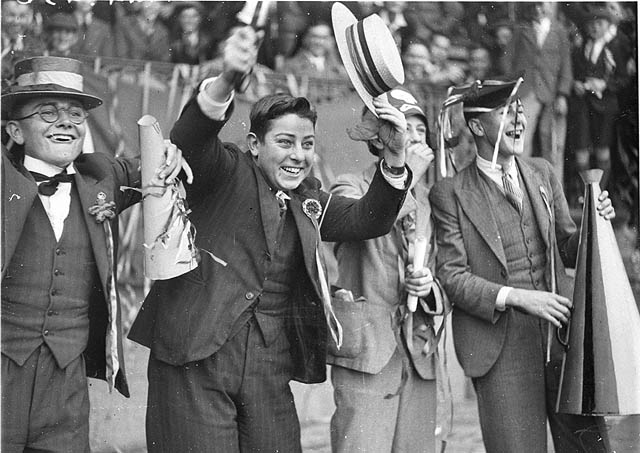
CBHS student cheer squad at the Combined High School sports carnival, 1934

The school became a full high school in 1925, and was subsequently renamed Canterbury Boys' High School. For some years, difficulty was experienced in encouraging boys to complete 4th Year, and to sit for the Leaving Certificate Examination the following year. This was due in part to the difficult economic conditions of the time, and in other cases, boys preferred to enrol in one of the more established high schools such as Sydney Boys' High School and the Sydney Technical High School. To increase enrolments in 4th year, Rourke pressured the Department, and boundary lines were established so that boys living within the area were compelled to enrol at Canterbury. The school was to later become a selective high school from which time many student enrolments were from out of area.

Further land on the northern side of the school was resumed in 1945, and later the gymnasium was erected on part of this land, and completed in 1954. Increasing enrolments and a lack of specialist rooms led to a major extension of the school buildings again being undertaken. The new structure, opened in 1969, contained six science laboratories, two music rooms, three art rooms, two technical drawing rooms, two woodwork rooms, a metalwork room, a new library and several classrooms, new toilets and a new canteen. This extension was connected to the old building via overhead walkways, and due to it being constructed around a central courtyard, quickly gained the name of the 'doughnut' block.

The appearance of the school changed little over the next two decades, however that was changed in 1988. Canterbury had been campaigning for a multipurpose hall for many years, and so there was much disappointment when a major refurbishing program for the original building and the provision of another classroom block did not include a school hall. There was however a transformation of the original building to that of which is present today. The main changes were lowering of the ceilings, replacement of the assembly hall, the conversion of some rooms on the top floor to a multi-purpose library, transferring the administration office to the front entrance, providing study rooms and two new staff rooms, and reducing the size of the original staff room. A ground level and first floor walkway was also constructed along the eastern side of the building.

In 1958 the status of the school was altered to become "semi-selective", that being from Years 1–3, three classes were fully selective and two classes were of a technical nature, ie, technical drawing, woodwork, metalwork etc. Students from all classes were invited to complete Years 4 and 5. The school retained this status until 1976 when it became a comprehensive high school as part of the school restructuring at the time. Today many of the school's programs have received acclaim in the printed media, on television and in Parliament. The school also received the Director General School Achievement to: "recognise the exceptional quality and outstanding achievements of this school in its Student Welfare Program and Harmonious Race Relations."

== Principals ==
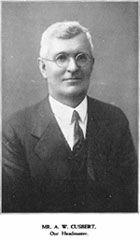
A.W. Cusbert second Principal of CBHS

Period	Details
1918–1932	E. J. Rourke
1933–1946	A. W. Cusbert
1947–1949	W. D. Noakes
1950–1954	F. C. Wootten
1955–1960	E. R. S. Watson
1961–1974	R. M. Cooper
1975–1979	R. J. Oliver
1980–1984	J. Coutman
1984–1986	D. O'Carrigan
1987–1997	B. A. Mackenzie
1998–2006	A. Martin
2006–2012	L. Mitton
2012–2016	D. Hill
2016–2018	B. Giudice
2019–present	R. Dummett

== Facilities ==
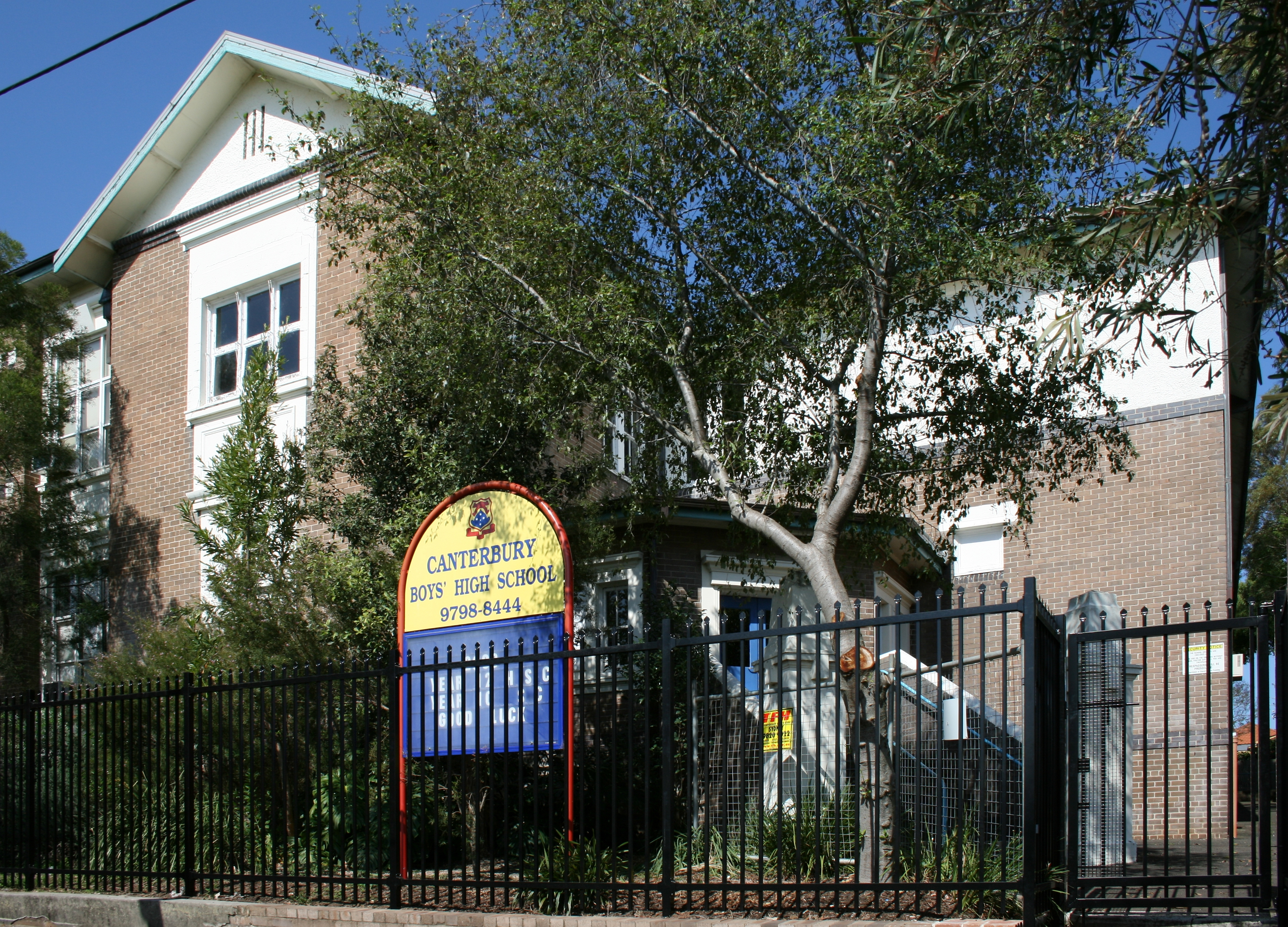
Main school entrance

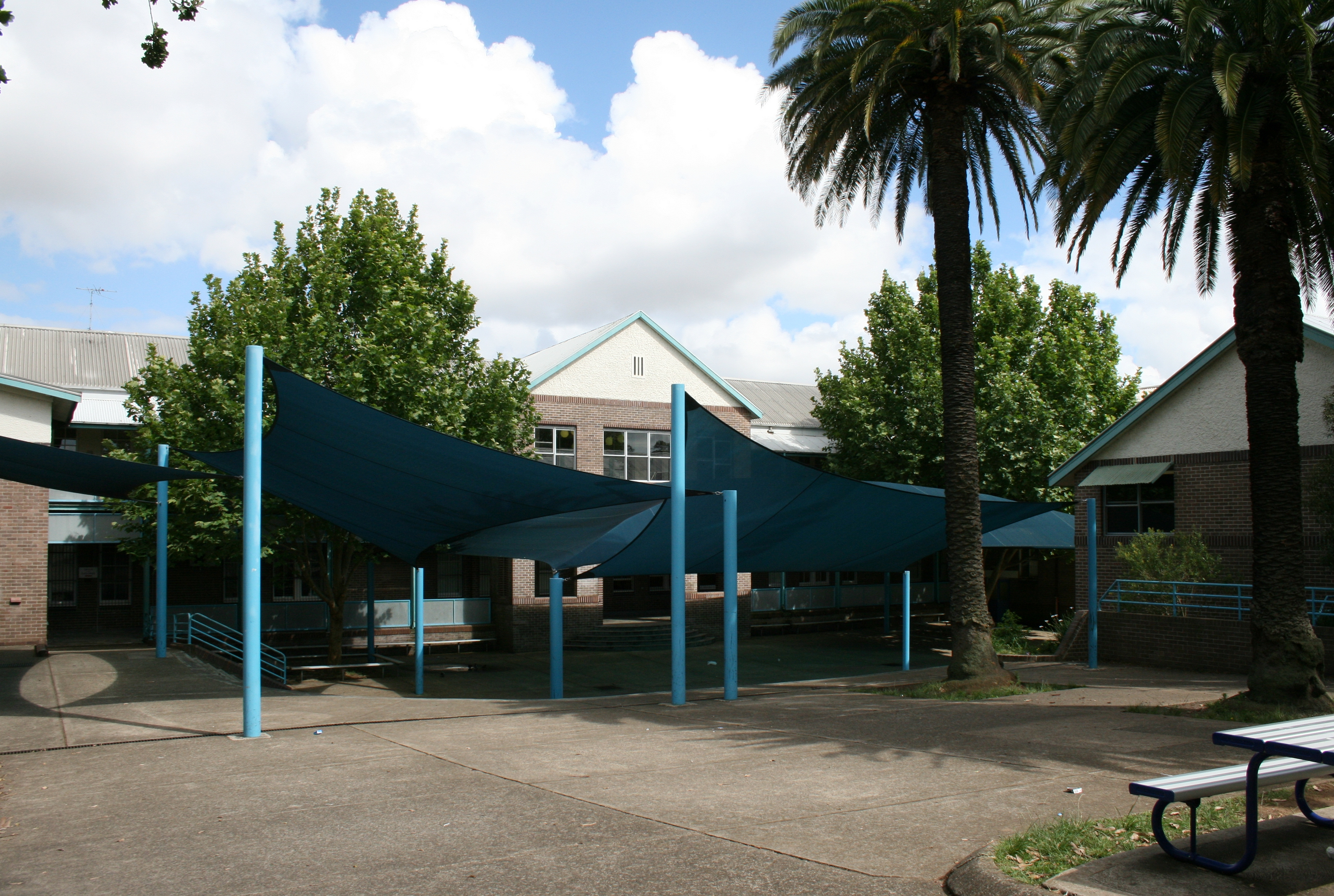
Courtyard near the main buildings

The facilities of Canterbury Boys' High School include a library for texts and references and four main computer labs with smaller computer rooms scattered around the school buildings for the many courses which require computer access. It also has facilities for technology and fine arts programs, science labs, a gym, two outdoor basketball courts, and an oval for its physical education and sports programs.

== Co-curriculum ==
The school holds an annual "Cantervale" musical concert to showcase the talents of students and teachers, as well as featuring many cuisines and snacks from different cultures, provided by teachers, students and parents.

== Media ==
In 2004, the school featured in a four-part documentary, televised on the ABC, titled Our Boys. The program, directed by Kerry Brewster, documented the 2002 school year at Canterbury Boys' High School.

The school is also the subject of Fred Brown's Schooldays, a book written by former student, Fred Brown. The book gives an account of life and conditions at the school during World War II .

== Oprah Winfrey donation ==
During the first of two live shows in the Sydney Opera House on 14 December 2010, Oprah Winfrey donated $1 million to the school to overhaul the school's library and music rooms as well as providing laptops for every student at the school. The show included a live cross to the students who were in attendance.

== Old Cantabrians Union ==
Alumni of Canterbury Boys' High School are known as Old Cantabrians, and may join the schools alumni association, the Old Cantabrians' Union. The union was inaugurated in 1928, and today former students often visit the school, and are represented at formal functions such as the Year 12 Farewell, Presentation Night and the Prefects Induction evening.

=== Notable alumni ===
Academic

- Samuel Ball – foundational education evaluator of Sesame Street, Pro Vice Chancellor Sydney University, CEO Board of Studies Victoria
- Samuel Warren Carey – geologist
- Harry Jocelyn – Latinist and scholar
- John Francis Lovering – geologist, professor, Dean and Pro Vice Chancellor, University of Melbourne (1969–1987) and Vice Chancellor, Flinders University (1987–1995).
- Dr Jeffrey Miller AM – academic, founding principal (Vice Chancellor) of Cumberland College of Health Sciences (1972–1990), Honorary Professor Chinese Academy of Medical Sciences and Peking Union Medical College (1988)

Medicine

- (Alan) Eric Fisher AM – president of the Marriage Guidance Council in 1985; president of the Royal Australian College of General Practitioners from 1986 to 1988.
- Ben Haneman – physician

Entertainment, media and the arts

- Grahame Bond, comedian, actor and creator of The Aunty Jack Show
- Bill Collins, film historian and TV presenter
- Bryan Davies, singer and entertainer
- Geoffrey Chard, operatic baritone
- David Frith, cricket author and journalist
- John M. Green, author, publisher and company director
- Nicholas Papademetriou, actor
- Murray Sayle, journalist
- Lucky Starr, singer and entertainer
- Keith Windschuttle, historian, author and publisher, his most notable and controversial work being The Fabrication of Aboriginal History

Politics, public service and the law

- Jim Cameron, former MLA for Northcott
- Ken Gabb, former Minister for Aboriginal Affairs and MLA for Earlwood
- John M. Green, former partner of predecessor law firms of Ashurst LLP and Herbert Smith Freehills
- Frank Hassett, army general
- Hon John Howard OM, AC, Prime Minister of Australia (1996–2007); Class of 1956
- Hon John Ryan AM, former Member of the Legislative Council
- Eric John Shields QC, barrister, former Senior Public Defender (NSW) (also attended Orange High School)
- Frank Sleeman, former Lord Mayor of Brisbane
- John Rowlstone Stevenson, army officer
- Trevor Swan, economist
- Gordon Upton, public servant and diplomat

Religion

- Douglas Trathen, Methodist minister and former Headmaster of Newington College
- Peter Watson, archbishop of the Anglican Diocese of Melbourne from 2000 to 2005
- Bruce Wilson, bishop

Sport

- Alofa Alofa, rugby union player
- Herb Elphinston, cricket umpire
- Bill Gilmour Sr., tennis player
- Ted Glossop, former rugby league player and coach of the Canterbury Bulldogs
- Pierre Hola, rugby union player
- Russ Kelly, rugby union player
- Arthur Morris, former cricket player who captained the Australian cricket team
- Anthony Mundine, boxer and former rugby league player (also attended Cleveland Street High School and Kingsgrove High School)
- George Peponis, former rugby league player who represented the Kangaroos and served as CEO of the Canterbury Bulldogs
- Pat Serret, tennis player

== See also ==
- List of Government schools in New South Wales
