= Bertha Rees =

Australian botanist and university lecturer (1880–1957)

Bertha Clara Rees (1880–1957) was an Australian botanist and university lecturer.

Rees was born in Brighton, Victoria in 1880, daughter of Clara Anna (née Wadelton) and solicitor David Curtis Rees. She passed the University of Melbourne matriculation examination in 1899, achieving honours in elementary anatomy and physiology and botany.

Rees taught at Tintern Girls Grammar School where her students included Ethel Irene McLennan. She returned to the school in 1931 as guest of honour with McLennan, then associate professor of botany at the University of Melbourne. She also taught science at Sydenham Ladies' College, Moonee Ponds in 1909. In June that year she received a £50 government scholarship from the University of Melbourne to study the "longevity of seeds' contribution to flora of Victoria". In April 1912 she replaced Jean White as botanical lecturer assisting Alfred James Ewart.

She wrote a number of papers, singly or as joint author with Ewart and White, which were published in the Proceedings of the Royal Society of Victoria.

The standard author abbreviation B.Rees is used to indicate this person as the author when citing a botanical name.

== Personal ==
Following her marriage to engineer Edgar Gowar Ritchie in September 1914, she resigned from her university post. Her husband died in 1956.

Rees died in 1957 at St Kilda East, Victoria.
