= Jean White-Haney =

Australian botanist

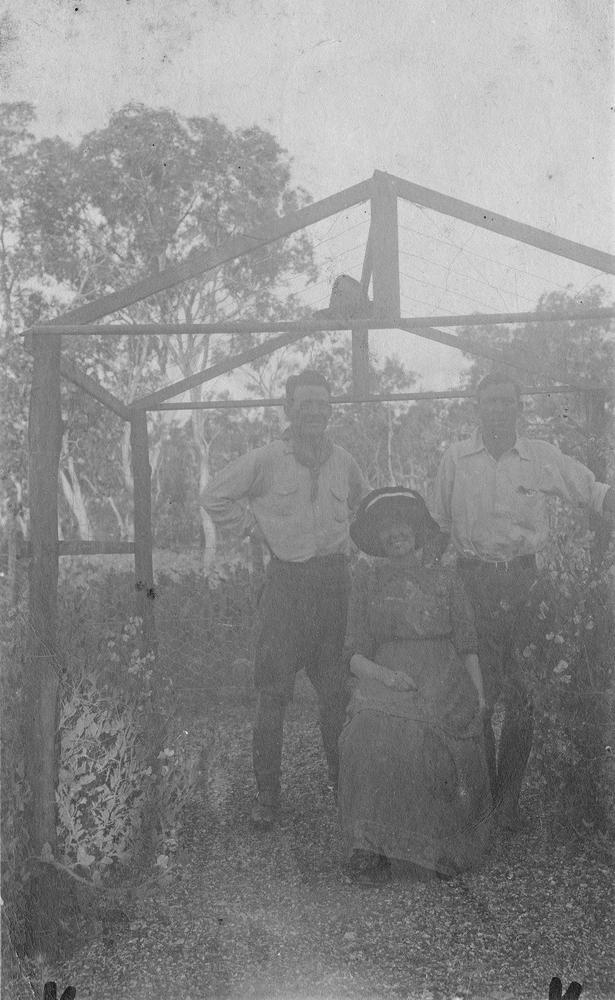
Queensland Prickly Pear Board's research station, Dulacca, ca 1913. The seated woman is possibly Dr Jean White.

Rose Ethel Janet White-Haney (11 March 1877 – 21 October 1953), known as Jean White-Haney, was a botanist in Queensland, Australia. She was officer-in-charge of the Queensland Board of Advice on Prickly Pear Destruction and helped develop biological control methods for managing the invasive cactus.

== Early life and education ==
Jean White was the seventh of eight children of Edward John White, astronomer at Melbourne Observatory. She was educated privately until the age of 15, then at Presbyterian Ladies' College, Melbourne and the University of Melbourne, being awarded B.Sc. 1904, M.Sc. 1906, D.Sc. 1909. She was the second woman in Australia to be awarded a Doctorate of Science. She was awarded a McBain Research Scholarship, researching in the Department of Botany under Professor Alfred James Ewart. Thirteen papers bearing her name were published between 1907 and 1911.

== Prickly-Pear Experimental Station, Dulacca ==
The Queensland Board of Advice on Prickly Pear Destruction placed her in charge of their experimental station at Dulacca in 1912. She served there until 1916, developing insect and chemical controls to fight prickly pear infestation. On 22 February 1915 she married American born agricultural chemist Victor William Haney.

Dr. White-Haney had success against one species of tree cactus (Opuntia monacantha) prevalent in North Queensland using cochineal insects (Coccus indicus) and, although this insect was not effective against the most prevalent species of pear, this success encouraged the continuing search for biological controls that led eventually to the introduction of the Cactoblastis cactorum moth that eventually brought the pest under control. She published three reports on the work of the experimental station, where she remained in charge until its closure in 1916 when the war made it difficult to obtain staff and chemicals for experiments.

== Later activities in Australia ==
Jean took a break from research while she brought up her two sons. During this time she lived in Brisbane, becoming a founding member of the Lyceum Club and a committee member of the Queensland Bush Book Club. She attended the Pan-Pacific Science Congress in Tokyo in 1926 and was contracted by the Council for Scientific and Industrial Research, a position which took her all over Australia. Her last scientific work was the study of pasture weeds Noogoora and Bathurst burr. She moved to the United States in 1930. She died at Camarillo, California on 21 October 1953 and was buried in Inglewood Park Cemetery.
