= Royal Society of Victoria =

Learned society in Victoria, Australia

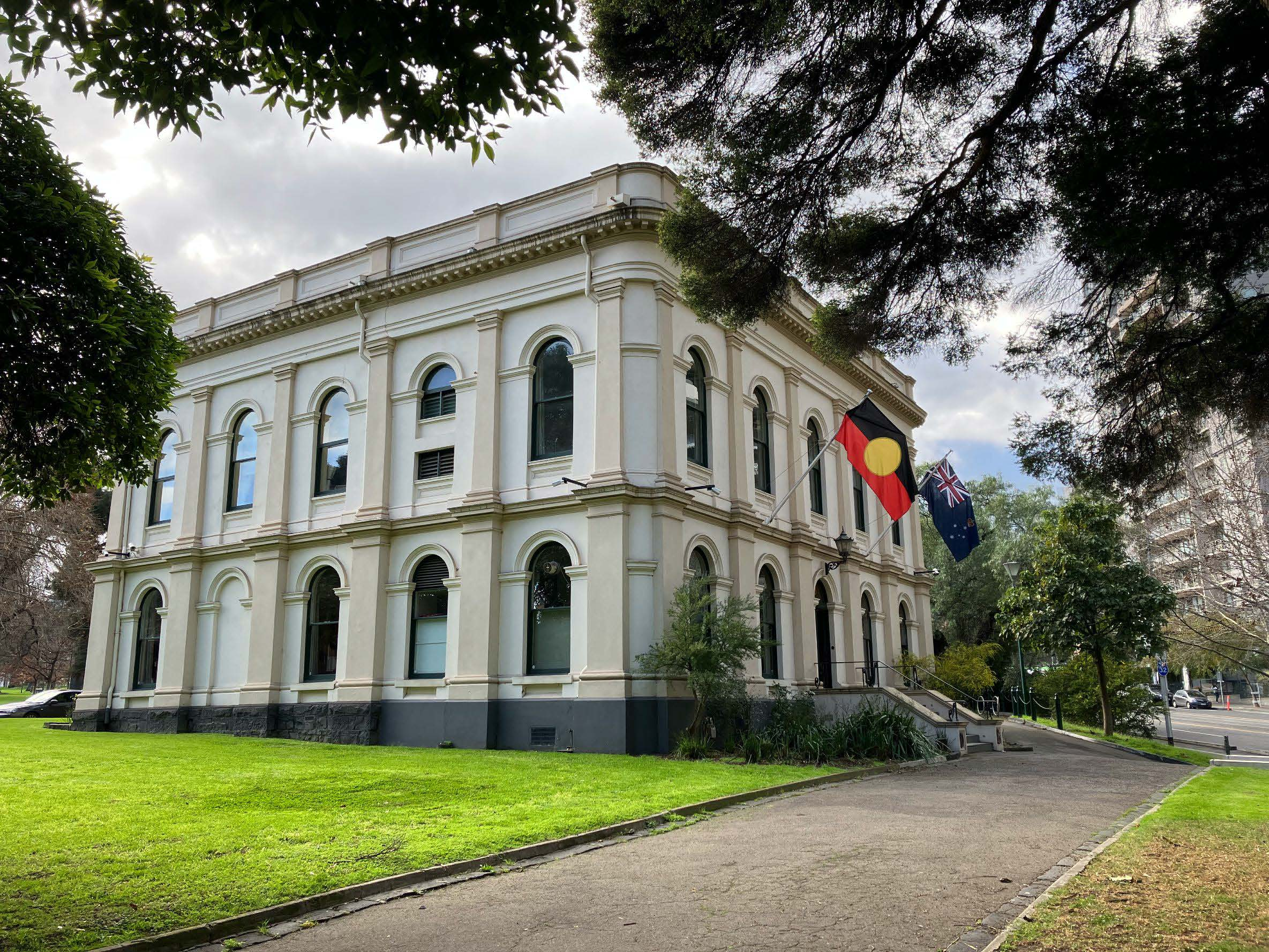
The Royal Society of Victoria's historic headquarters, designed by Joseph Reed, purpose-built in 1859.

The Royal Society of Victoria (RSV) is the oldest scientific society in Victoria, Australia.

== Foundation ==
In 1854 two organisations formed with similar aims and membership, these being the Victorian Institute for the Advancement of Science (founded 15 June, 1854, inaugural president Justice Sir Redmond Barry) and the Philosophical Society of Victoria (founded 12 August, 1854, inaugural president Andrew Clarke). These two merged in July 1855 to form the Philosophical Institute of Victoria, with Clarke as the inaugural president. The Philosophical Institute received Royal Charter in 1859, and the first president of the freshly renamed Royal Society of Victoria was Ferdinand von Mueller (later Baron Sir Ferdinand von Mueller), then Victoria's Government Botanist. In 1860 the RSV organised the ill-fated Burke & Wills expedition under the Presidency of Victorian Governor Sir Henry Barkly.

== Activities ==
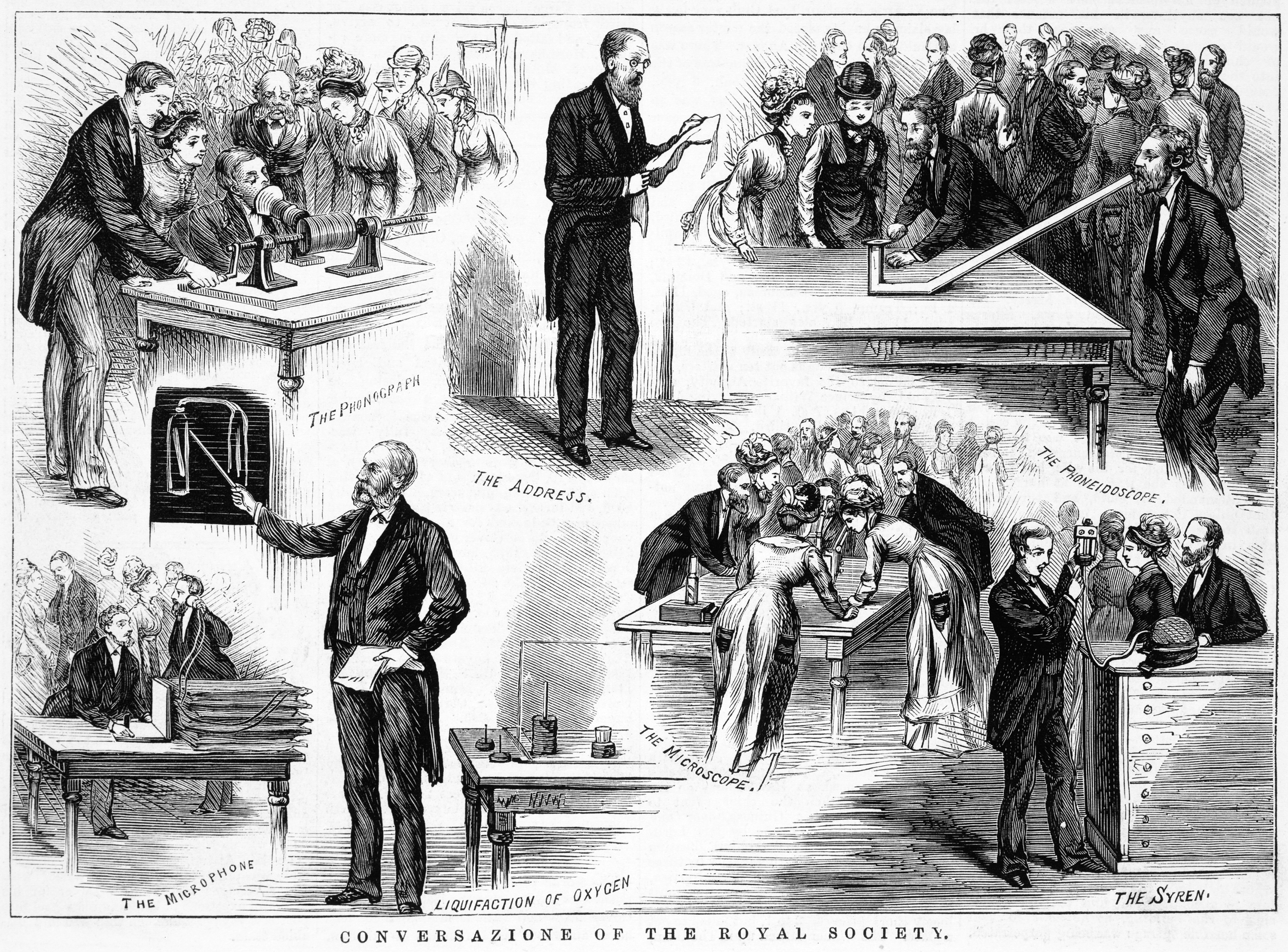
Wood engraving published in The illustrated Australian news, depicting a public demonstration of new technology at the Royal Society of Victoria (Melbourne, Australia) on 8 August 1878.

The society has played an important role in the life of Melbourne and Victoria, including a foundational relationship with the Melbourne Museum, the Royal Botanic Gardens Victoria, the Melbourne Observatory and Victoria's National Parks. The society convened the first Australian Antarctic Exploration Committee in 1885, commissioned the Burke & Wills expedition and established the Victorian Institute of Marine Sciences in 1978 (now the Marine and Freshwater Discovery Centre in Queenscliff). Many long-standing community organisations concerned with nature and conservation have grown from an early association with the Royal Society of Victoria, such as the Victorian National Parks Association and the Field Naturalists Club of Victoria.

Located in its heritage-listed headquarters at 8 La Trobe Street, in the centre of Melbourne, the Society's modern role is to communicate and advocate for the important role of science in society, providing public lectures about the latest scientific work and thinking underway in Victoria, and convening forums with government and community to explore an evidence-based approach to issues facing the state. The Society conducts a state-wide program through management of the Inspiring Victoria program, a federally-funded initiative to engage communities with science and promote scientific literacy, including National Science Week.

The Society edits and produces the Proceedings of the Royal Society of Victoria, one of Australia's longest-running regional science journals. Back issues from the 19th century through to the early 21st century are digitised and accessible from the State Library of Victoria's online catalogue, along with holdings of the Society's historical papers and archives. Issues published from 2009 are available online, open access through CSIRO Publishing.

== Awards ==
The Society confers prizes, awards and medals to recognise high-achievement throughout a scientist's various career stages. RSV bursaries are provided to school students through annual sponsorship of the Science Talent Search run by the Science Teachers' Association of Victoria. Early career researchers are acknowledged annually through the Young Scientist Research Prizes and the Phillip Law Postdoctoral Award. Peak career achievements are recognised through the annual award of the RSV Medal for Excellence in Scientific Research. Distinguished lifetime contributions to science, in particular the public engagement with and understanding of science, are recognised through election as an RSV Fellow.

Fellows of the Royal Society of Victoria are entitled to the use of the professional postnominal FRSV; subscribed members of the RSV are entitled to use of the professional postnominal MRSV.

== Presidents ==
- 1859: Baron Sir Ferdinand von Mueller
- 1860–1863: Sir Henry Barkly
- 1864: Sir Frederick McCoy
- 1865: Rev. Dr John Ignatius Bleasdale
- 1866–1884: Robert L.J. Ellery
- 1885–1900: William Charles Kernot
- 1901: Dr James Jamieson
- 1902: Edward John White
- 1903: John Dennant
- 1904: Sir Walter Baldwin Spencer
- 1905: George Sweet
- 1906: Edward John Dunn
- 1907: Calder E. Oliver
- 1908–1909: Pietro P.G.E. Baracchi
- 1910–1911: Ernest Willington Skeats
- 1912–1913: John Shephard
- 1914–1915: Thomas Sergeant Hall
- 1916–1917: William A. Osborne
- 1918–1919: James A. Kershaw
- 1920–1921: Alfred James Ewart
- 1922–1923: Frank Wisewould
- 1924: Thomas H. Laby
- 1925–1926: Joseph M. Baldwin
- 1927–1928: Wilfred Eade Agar
- 1929–1930: Frederick Chapman
- 1931–1932: Herbert S. Summers
- 1933–1934: William J. Young
- 1935–1936: Norman A. Esserman
- 1937–1938: Samuel M. Wadham
- 1939–1940: Daniel J. Mahony
- 1941–1942: Reuben T. Patton
- 1943–1944: William Baragwanath
- 1945–1946: John King Davis
- 1947–1948: Dermot A. Casey
- 1949–1950: Philip Crosbie Morrison
- 1951–1952: John S. Turner
- 1953–1954: Frank Leslie Stillwell
- 1955–1956: Edwin S. Hills
- 1957–1958: Valentine G. Anderson
- 1959–1960: Geoffrey W. Leeper
- 1961–1962: Richard R. Garran
- 1963–1964: Richard T.M. Pescott
- 1965–1966: John H. Chinner
- 1967–1968: Phillip G. Law
- 1969–1970: Edmund D. Gill
- 1971–1972: Alfred Dunbavin Butcher
- 1973–1974: Sir Robert R. Blackwood
- 1975–1976: James D. Morrison
- 1977–1978: John F. Lovering AO
- 1979–1980: Lionel L. Stubbs
- 1980–1982: Gordon D. Aitchison
- 1983–1984: David M. Churchill
- 1985–1986: Dr Grisha A. Sklovsky
- 1986–1987: Dr Terence P. O'Brien
- 1987 (July–December): Dr Grisha A. Sklovsky
- 1988–1990: Dr William R.S. Briggs
- 1991–1992: Dr Graeme F. Watson
- 1993–1994: Dr John W. Zillman AO
- 1995–1996: Dr Maxwell G. Lay AM
- 1997–1998: Professor Em. Herbert H. Bolotin
- 1999–2001: Associate Professor Gordon D. Sanson
- 2001–2003: Associate Professor Neil W. Archbold
- 2006–2007: Associate Professor Bruce Livett
- 2007–2010: Professor Graham D. Burrows AO
- 2010–2012: Professor Lynne Selwood AO
- 2013–2017: Dr William D. (Bill) Birch AM
- 2017–2021: Mr David Zerman
- 2021– : Mr Robert Gell AM

== Publication ==
- Proceedings of the Royal Society of Victoria. Melbourne : The Society, 1889- Semiannual. ISSN 0035-9211. Formerly the Transactions and Proceedings of the Royal Society of Victoria
