= Alfred James Ewart =

English-Australian botanist (1872-1937)

Alfred James Ewart, FRS (12 February 1872 – 12 September 1937) was an English-Australian botanist.

== Early life and education ==
Ewart was born in Toxteth Park, Liverpool, England, second son of Edmund Brown Ewart, B.A. and his wife, Martha née Williams. He was educated at the Liverpool Institute and University College, Liverpool, then graduated with a Ph.D. from Leipzig University and D.Sc. from Oxford.

== Career ==
In 1906, Ewart became the foundation chair of botany and plant physiology at the University of Melbourne.

Ewart was elected a Fellow of the Royal Society in 1922. Ewart was president of Section D (Biology) of the Australasian Association for the Advancement of Science meeting in Melbourne in 1921, and of Section M (Botany) at Perth in 1926.

== Personal ==
Ewart married twice; his first wife was musician and composer Florence Maud Donaldson, with whom he had two sons. His second marriage was to Elizabeth Bilton in 1931. Ewart died on 12 September 1937.

== Bibliography ==
- Serle, Percival (1949). "Ewart, Alfred James". Dictionary of Australian Biography. Sydney: Angus & Robertson.
- T. C. Chambers, 'Ewart, Alfred James (1872 - 1937)', Australian Dictionary of Biography, Volume 8, MUP, 1981, pp 448–450. Retrieved on 17 October 2008.
