= Peter Nicol Russell =

Australian philanthropist (1816–1905)

Sir Peter Nicol Russell
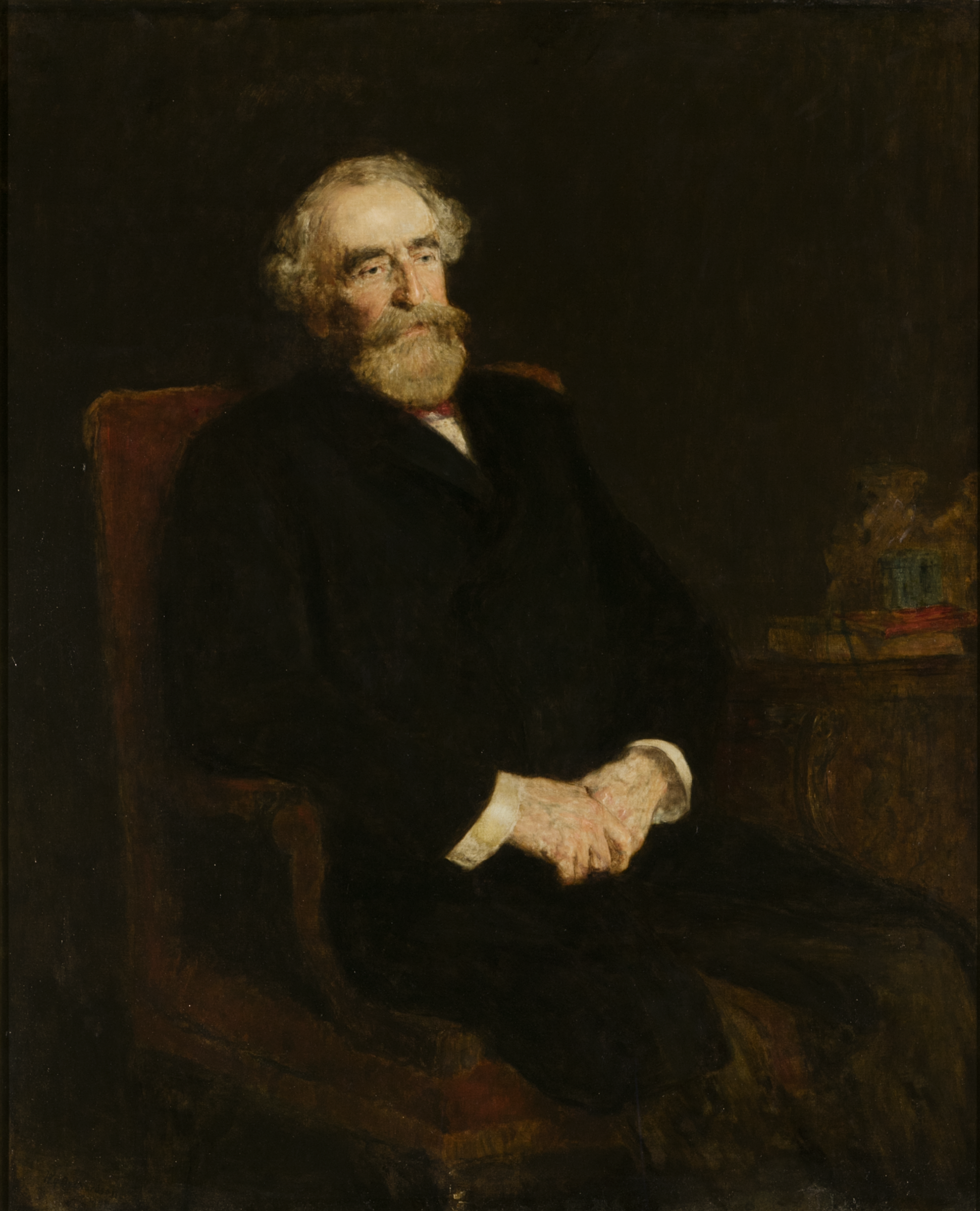
- Portrait by W. Q. Orchardson RA
- Born: 4 July 1816; Kirkcaldy, Fife, Scotland
- Died: 10 July 1905 (aged 89); London, England
- Resting place: East Finchley Cemetery
- Education: Abbotshall Parish School; Kirkcaldy Grammar
- Spouse: Charlotte Russell (née Lorimer)
- Children: none
- Parent(s): Robert Russell; Janet Russell (née Nicol)
- Engineering career
- Discipline: Civil engineering Metallurgy
- Practice name: Russell Bros; Sydney Foundry and Engineering Works; P. N. Russell & Company

Signature
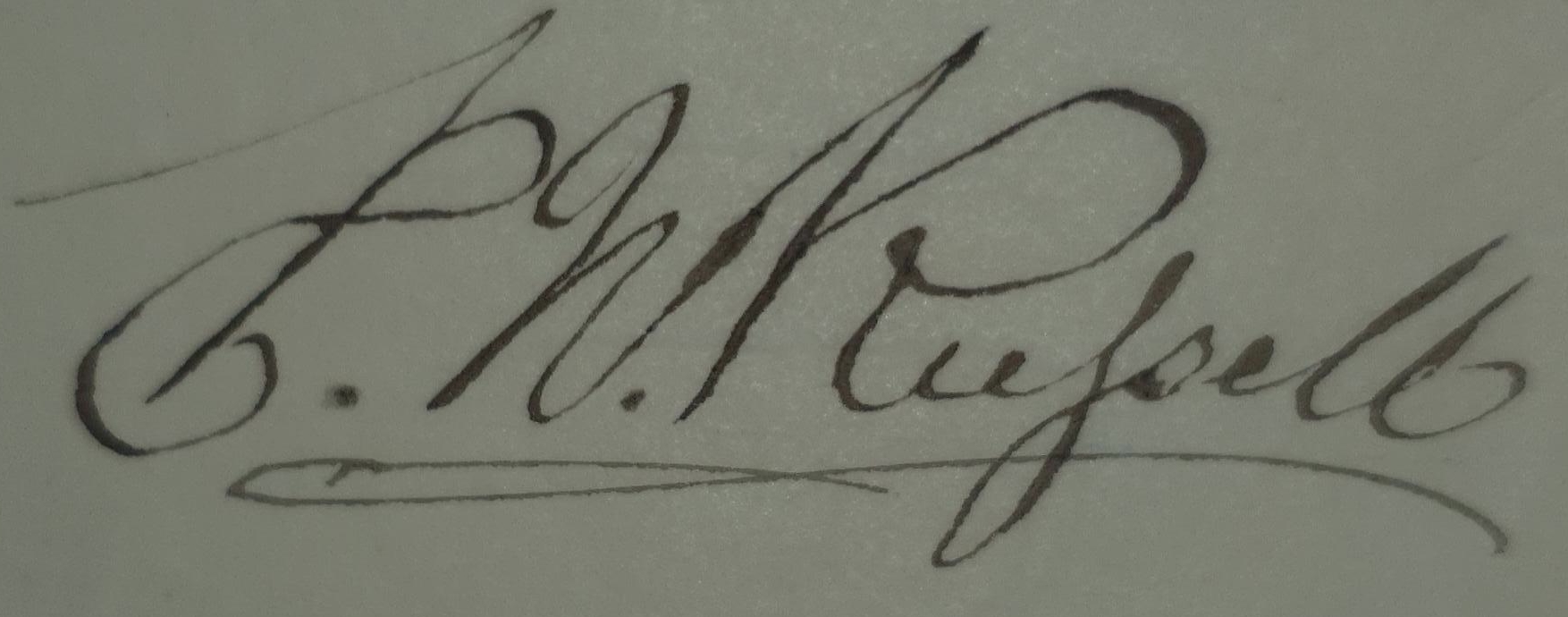

Sir Peter Nicol Russell (4 July 1816 – 10 July 1905), commonly referred to as P. N. Russell, was a Scottish foundry owner, manufacturing engineer, and benefactor of the University of Sydney.

Russell worked at iron foundries owned by his family in Scotland and Tasmania before starting a foundry and engineering works with his brothers on the banks of the Tank Stream in 1838 in the town of Sydney. Four years later, in 1842, Russell split from his brothers' business and founded his own operations where he remained for the next 13 years.

In 1855 he reunited with his brothers, forming P. N. Russell & Company, which became the largest steelworks in Australia at the time. Russell returned to London in 1860 to retire and remained attached to the business by acting as its London representative. Following a number of labour strikes at the business, P. N. Russell & Company closed its doors in 1875.

Russell retired with significant wealth and gifted A£100,000 to the University of Sydney, where the Peter Nicol Russell School of Engineering was named in his honour.

== Early life ==
Russell was born at Kirkcaldy, Fife, Scotland, the second son of eleven children of Robert Russell, engineer and iron founder, and his wife Janet, née Nicol. Robert Russell and his brother Alexander operated the Kirkcaldy Foundry and Engineering Works.

Russell was educated first at Abbotshall Parish School, and then at Kirkcaldy Grammar School. He worked for his father and uncle's firm, Alexander and Robert Russell, Kirkcaldy Foundry and Engineering Works, for a period, following which he joined with his father and brothers in establishing their own company, the Phoenix Foundry and Engineering Works. The Phoenix Foundry and Engineering Works did not succeed in making money and so Robert Russell emigrated with his family to Van Diemen's Land (now Tasmania) in June 1832, receiving a 810-hectare (2,000-acre) land grant for the purpose of establishing a new foundry. The land granted to Robert Russell proved unsuitable for the plant's requirements as it was too densely treed, and so the family sold the land and set up a general engineering and foundry works in Hobart Town. In late 1838, due to limited business opportunities, the business was wound up and the family moved to Sydney.

== Career in Australia ==
Russell's career in Australia includes a number of engineering and metalwork businesses that he founded, namely Russell Bros, Sydney Foundry and Engineering Works, and P. N. Russell & Co.

=== Russell Bros ===
Shortly after the family's move to Sydney in 1838, Russell and his brothers established Russell Bros, located in Queen's Square, Sydney, on the banks of Tank Stream. Russell Bros' business operations consisted of "engineering, brass-founding, and copper-smithing, with iron and machinery stores in Bridge Street".

=== Sydney Foundry and Engineering Works ===
In 1842 Russell left Russell Bros and leased the Sydney Foundry and Engineering Works from the estate of James Blanch, which he named Sydney Foundry and Engineering Works.

During this same year, the youngest of Russell's brothers George established a marine engineering firm in Sussex Street, Sydney, called George Russell and Co., Engineers.

=== P. N. Russell & Company ===
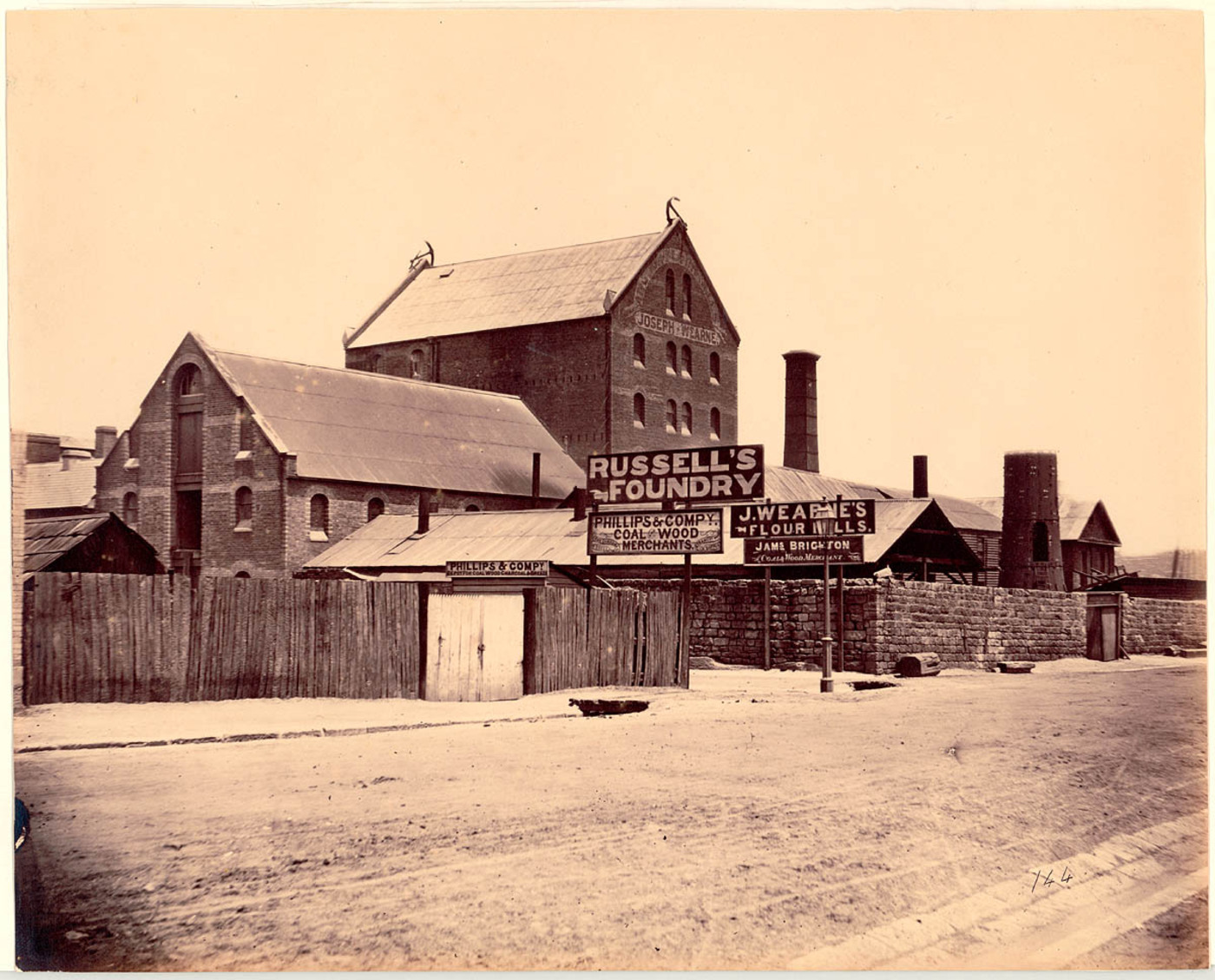
P. N. Russell & Co presumed to be on the corner of Bathurst Street and Barker Street in Sydney, now part of Darling Harbour

In 1855 following the demise of Russell Bros, Russell re-united with his brothers George and John, absorbing George's marine engineering firm, to form P. N. Russell and Company. This firm which became the largest and most successful business of its kind in Australia at the time. The company was also known as Russell's Foundry. It was located at 3 Barker Street, Sydney, in modern-day Darling Harbour.

The firm won contracts for a number of significant works, including "contracts for roads and railway bridges, railway rolling stock, steam dredges, gun boats, and crushing and flour milling machinery".

In 1860 Russell left for London, where he acted as London representative of the business.

P. N. Russell & Company's operations were disrupted twice by industrial action in its history, first in 1861 and then in 1874. Russell's labour relations had been known to be poor at different stages throughout the business' lifetime.

The 1861 strike was brought on after a proposal to reduce wages and challenge the eight-hour day working condition. In early May 1861, citing increased competition, the business announced that they would be reducing wages by 10%. Following a meeting on 16 May 1861, Russell's employees outright rejected the need to lower wages, arguing that the company had a competitive edge in the market due to its wide range of product offerings. Further, one strike leader argued, "every other shop was paying from twenty to thirty per cent more than Russell's; and in Victoria the iron trade received double the wages they did here [in Sydney], and for eight hours work too." The first strike began on 17 May 1861, and became known as "the severest strike the [New South Wales] colony had known". Twenty to thirty employees refused to report for work, and a further thirty left in the next two months. The industrial action was financially supported by bakers, stonemasons, coal-miners and painters, one of the most significant examples of inter-union cooperation in Sydney's history to-date, having the support of the Amalgamated Society of Engineers and the Australian Iron Trades Protective Association.

Six weeks into the strike, in the first few weeks of July 1861, the striking ironworkers accepted lower wages as an inevitability, and pivoted their arguments towards bargaining for an eight-hour workday. In January 1862, following a legal challenge on the strike's key organisers, William Collins and J. Patton, the dispute was formally closed at an all-trades meeting, however calls for the eight-hour workday failed. The dispute with P. N. Russell & Company is credited with effecting the downfall of trade unionism in New South Wales for nearly a decade, with the trade union movement's inability to cohesively coordinate itself.

In December 1865, shareholders of Fitzroy Iron Works voted in favour of a merger with P. N. Russell & Company. The ironworks already supplied iron to Russell's business and to other businesses in Melbourne. To fund the acquisition, P. N. Russell & Company sought to raise capital, issuing 40,000 shares each at £5 to total £200,000. John Russell would be stationed at the Fitzroy Works as managing director, with George Russell remaining to supervise the Sydney-based works. The capital raising failed, however, and the merger did not proceed.

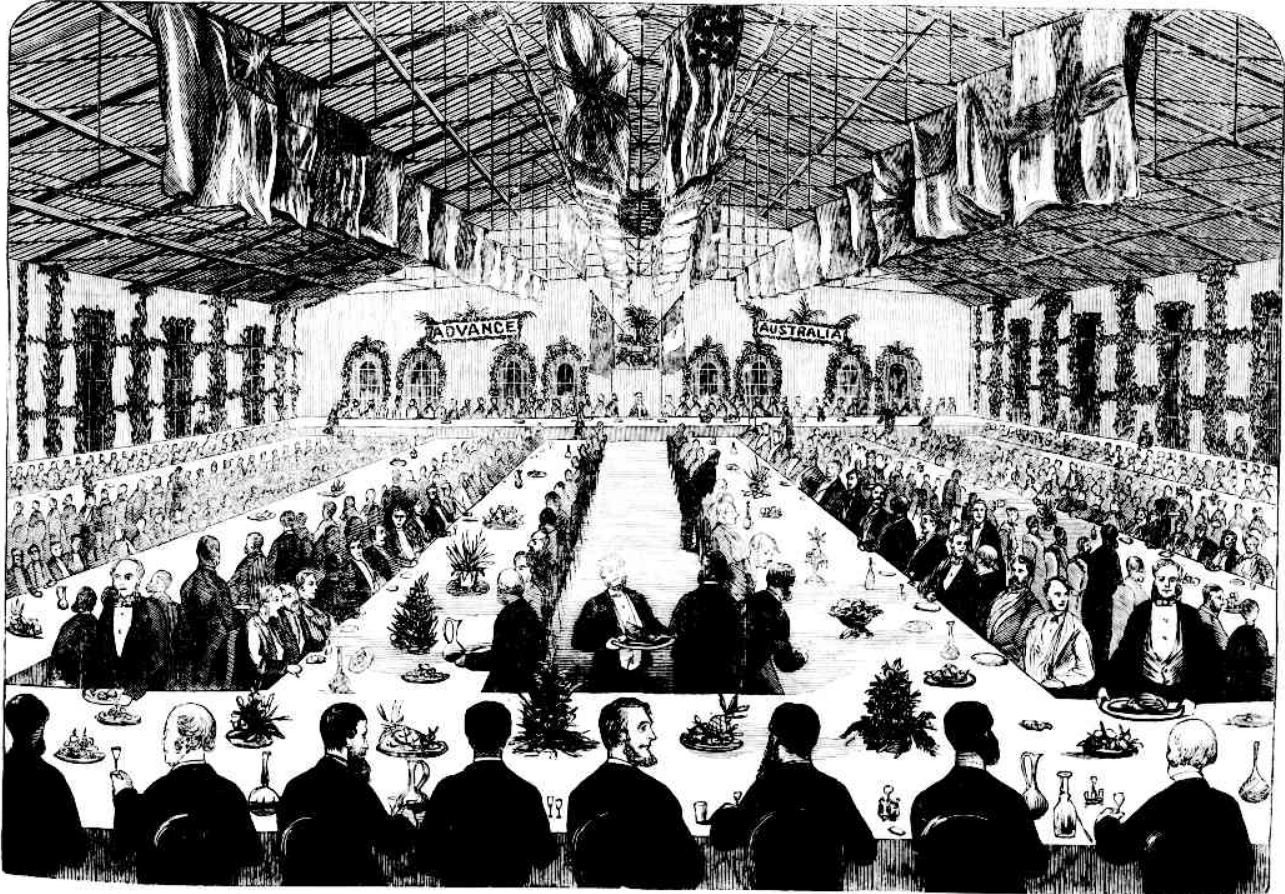
Celebration for the opening of P. N. Russell & Co's new railway carriage factory, as depicted in the Illustrated Sydney News

Russell returned to Sydney in 1870 for the opening of P. N. Russell & Company's railway carriage factory, which was located directly opposite the 3 Barker Street premises. The multi-storey factory provided the "exclusive manufacture of railway rolling stock" to the growing Colony of New South Wales. At the opening celebration for the factory, which was attended by "nearly all the members of both Houses of Parliament, the foreign consuls, the members of the Municipal Council of Sydney, as well as most of the leading professional men and merchants of the city", Russell noted the growth of the establishment, stating, "In 1851 we employed 80 men and boys, and the wages we paid amounted to £3,800; in 1860, we employed 200 men and boys, to whom we paid £9,500; in 1865, we employed 321 men and boys, to whom we paid £27,250; in 1869, we employed 345 men and boys, to whom we paid £34,614."

In the early 1870s, following the revival of trade unionism in New South Wales, and establishment of several new unions, a renewed interest in the eight-hour movement, and issues with the company's policy's around meal breaks began to pick up momentum. Core to the issue was the inefficiency of the two meal break system. Anticipating a problem arising, P. N. Russell & Company posted a notice on 31 December 1873 proclaiming that from 2 January 1874, hours of work would be altered to afford for 4-1-4 hour day consisting of 4 hours of work, a 1-hour meal break, and then a further 4 hours of work. Employee reaction was swift, with all employees refusing to work until P. N Russell & Company withdrew their notice. The 1874 strike was to become "one of the most notable and far reaching [strikes] of the nineteenth century in [New South Wales]". In 1875 the business was closed after the company enforced a lockout, leading to roughly 600 men losing their jobs.

== Career in London ==
=== Standard Bank of London ===
Russell is listed as a director of the newly-formed Standard Bank of London, Limited on 11 December 1880, which was created as a joint-stock bank, listing in London as a privately held company for £2 million, consisting of 100,000 shares issued at £20. The Bank was located at 29 Lombard Street, London. In February 1881, the Bank was defrauded of £5,000. In April 1882, the Directors of the Bank issued a circular to shareholders recommending voluntary liquidation, due to a lack of business.

== Later life ==
In spite of the closure of P. N. Russell & Company, Russell's investments had prospered, and he retired a wealthy man. He retained an interest in Australia, making several return visits, and on 16 December 1896 made a gift of A£50,000 to the University of Sydney School of Engineering on condition that it be called the "Peter Nicol Russell School of Engineering". On 15 February 1904 he made a second gift of A£50,000 to be devoted to engineering scholarships, with the proviso that the government should provide A£25,000 for buildings.

In 1859 Russell married Charlotte Lorimer, daughter of Dr Alexander Lorimer who was a surgeon in the British Indian Army and later an Inspector General of Hospitals. Russell, who was knighted in 1904, died childless in London on 10 July 1905, aged 89. He is buried in East Finchley Cemetery. Under his will a total of £16,000 was left to various institutions and charities in Sydney.

== Legacy ==
Following Russell's endowments totalling £100,000 to the University of Sydney, the faculty known as the Peter Nicol Russell School of Engineering opened in 1909.

The Peter Nicol Russell Career Achievement Memorial Medal, established in 1919 by the Institution of Engineers to honour the memory of Russell, is the "most prestigious award conferred by Engineers Australia" on an Australian Engineer. The medal is awarded to members of Engineers Australia who have attained the age of 45 years and "only Honorary Fellows of Engineers Australia are eligible for nomination".

=== List of significant works and remaining items ===
P. N. Russell & Company was responsible for "extensive works, including contracts for road and railway bridges, railway rolling stock, steam dredges, gun boats, and crushing and flour milling machinery". A number of landmarks and objects that were produced by Russell's firms have been preserved. P. N. Russell & Company is also credited with participating in the beginnings of Australia's arms industry, casting & manufacturing Coehorn Mortars for the New Zealand Government during the New Zealand Wars.

Infrastructure name	Location	Year completed	Image	References
Denison Bridge	Crossing the Macquarie River at Bathurst, New South Wales	1870		
Prince Alfred Bridge	Crossing the Murrumbidgee River at Gundagai, New South Wales	1867		
River gunboats Koheroa and Rangiriri on behalf of the New Zealand Government	Delivered to Auckland, New Zealand. Only remnants of P.S. Rangiriri remain, located at the Waikato Museum	1864	Rangiriri	
Example of a Stamper battery produced by P. N. Russell & Company	Bendemeer, New South Wales	1872		
Remnants of a battery at the remains of the Adelong Falls Gold Workings	Adelong, New South Wales	1858		
Quartz crushing machine	Hill End, New South Wales	1872		

=== Memorials ===
Two portraits, one of Russell by W. Q. Orchardson RA, and another of his wife, Lady Charlotte Russell by Gerald Kelly, were donated to the University of Sydney by Lady Russell in 1911. The portrait of Russell hangs in the Great Hall of the University of Sydney.

Sculptor Bertram Mackennal was commissioned to create a pair of bronze and granite Edwardian-style memorial statues in his honour. The first is located at the East Finchley Cemetery in north London, and is Grade II listed on the National Heritage List for England.

Its duplicate, presented to the University of Sydney by Russell's wife to honour his name and inspire future generations, was positioned next to the Great Hall, later relocated by the ground floor entrance of the institution named after him.

Beside the grand granite and bronze monument, stands a single cast iron Ionian column, one of many such columns produced by the P. N. Russell and Co foundry. This marks where a professor at the University of Sydney met Russell, a meeting that ultimately resulted in Russell's gifts to the university. It commemorates Russell, but also stands as a symbol of his legacy as an engineer and contributions to the University of Sydney.

A memorial plaque has also been erected adjacent to the original Peter Nicol Russell School of Engineering, which was renamed the John Woolley Building in 1975, following the move of the Faculty of Engineering to its current location in Darlington, where the Peter Nicol Russell Building is named in honour of Russell.

Russell Place, which lies to the north of the John Woolley Building at the University of Sydney, is also named after Russell.

== Gallery ==
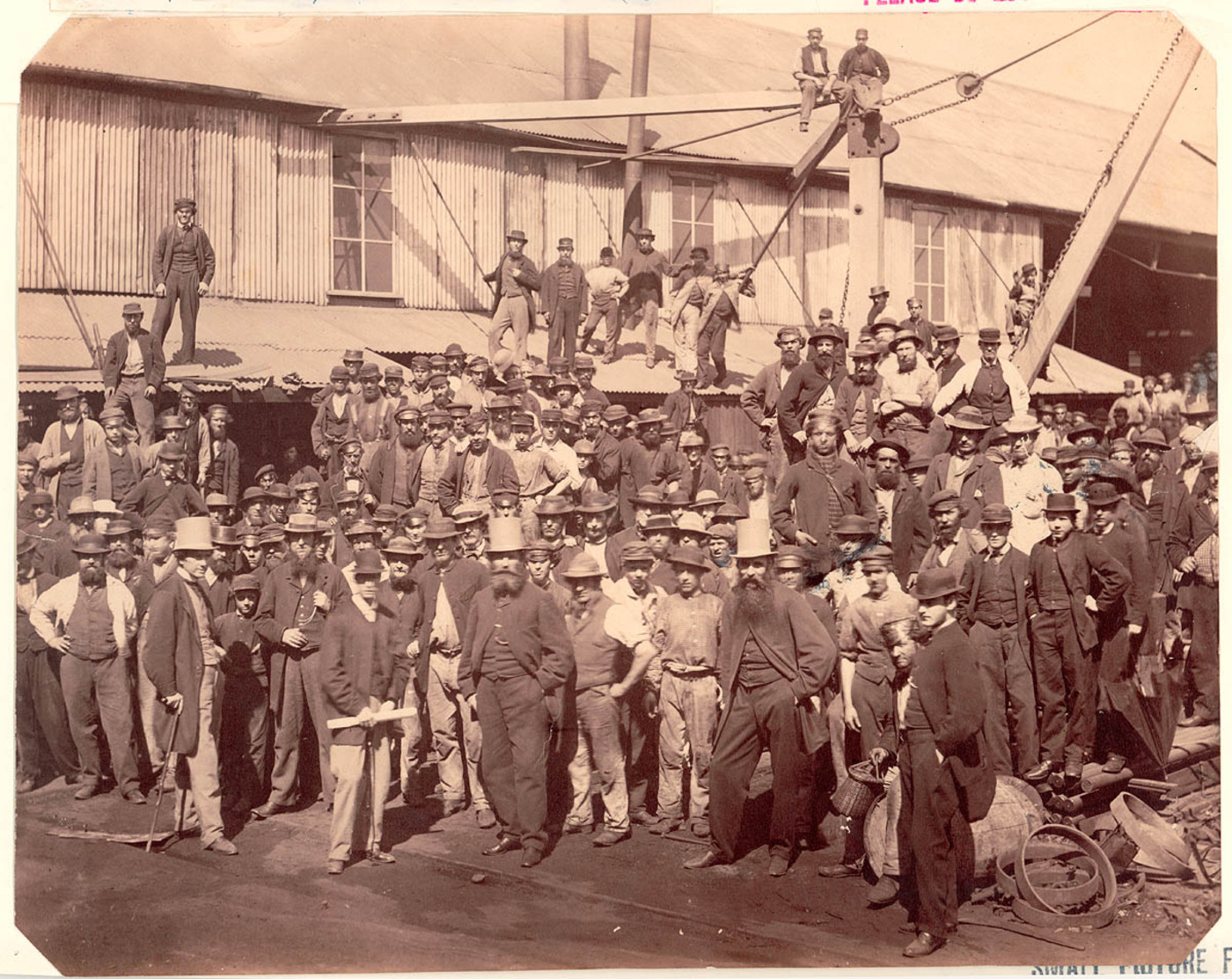
Employees of P. N. Russell & Co assembled outside the premises at 3 Barker Street, Sydney during the time of the 1874 eight-hour day strikes

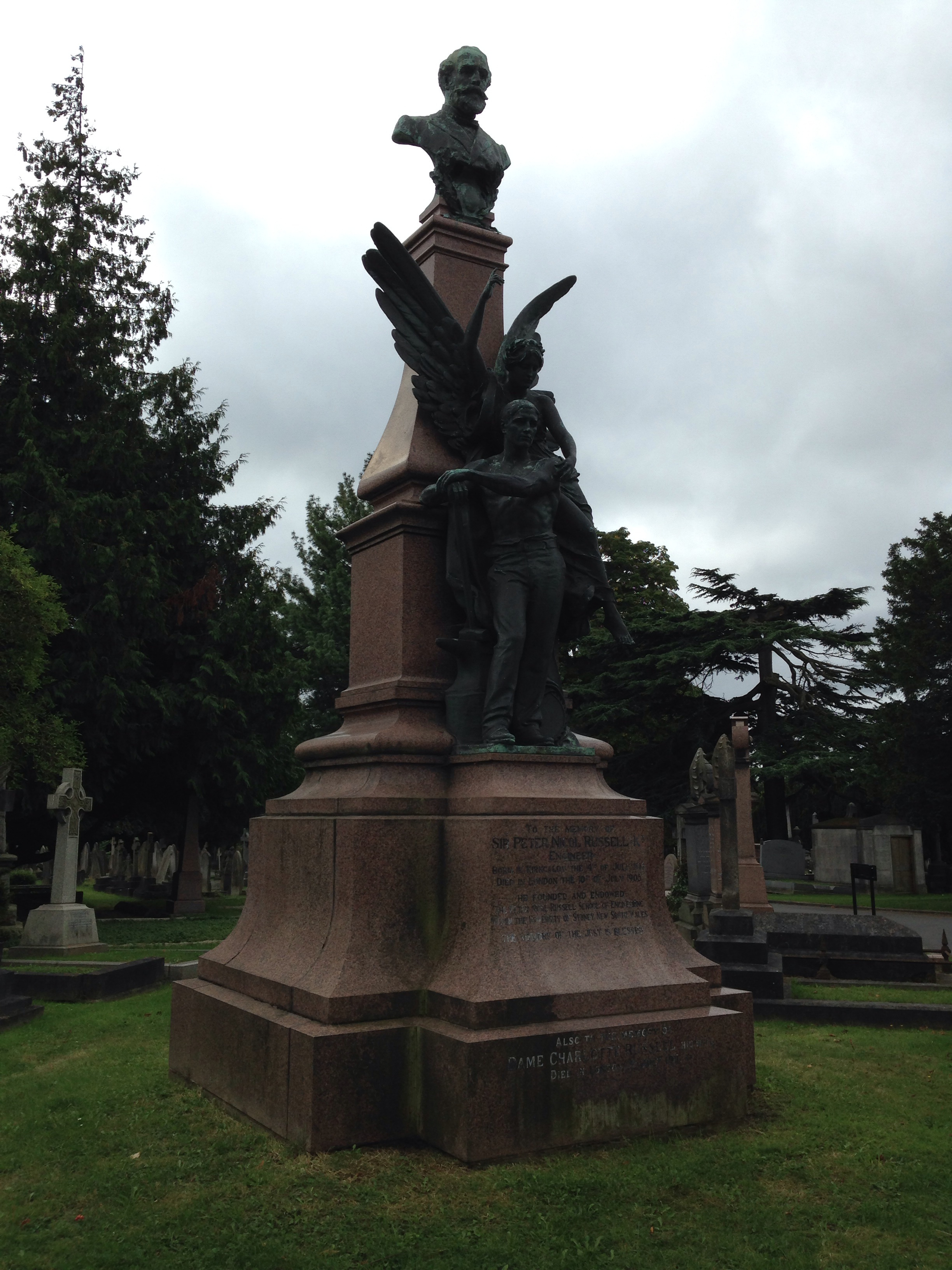
Memorial statue for Russell located at East Finchley Cemetery

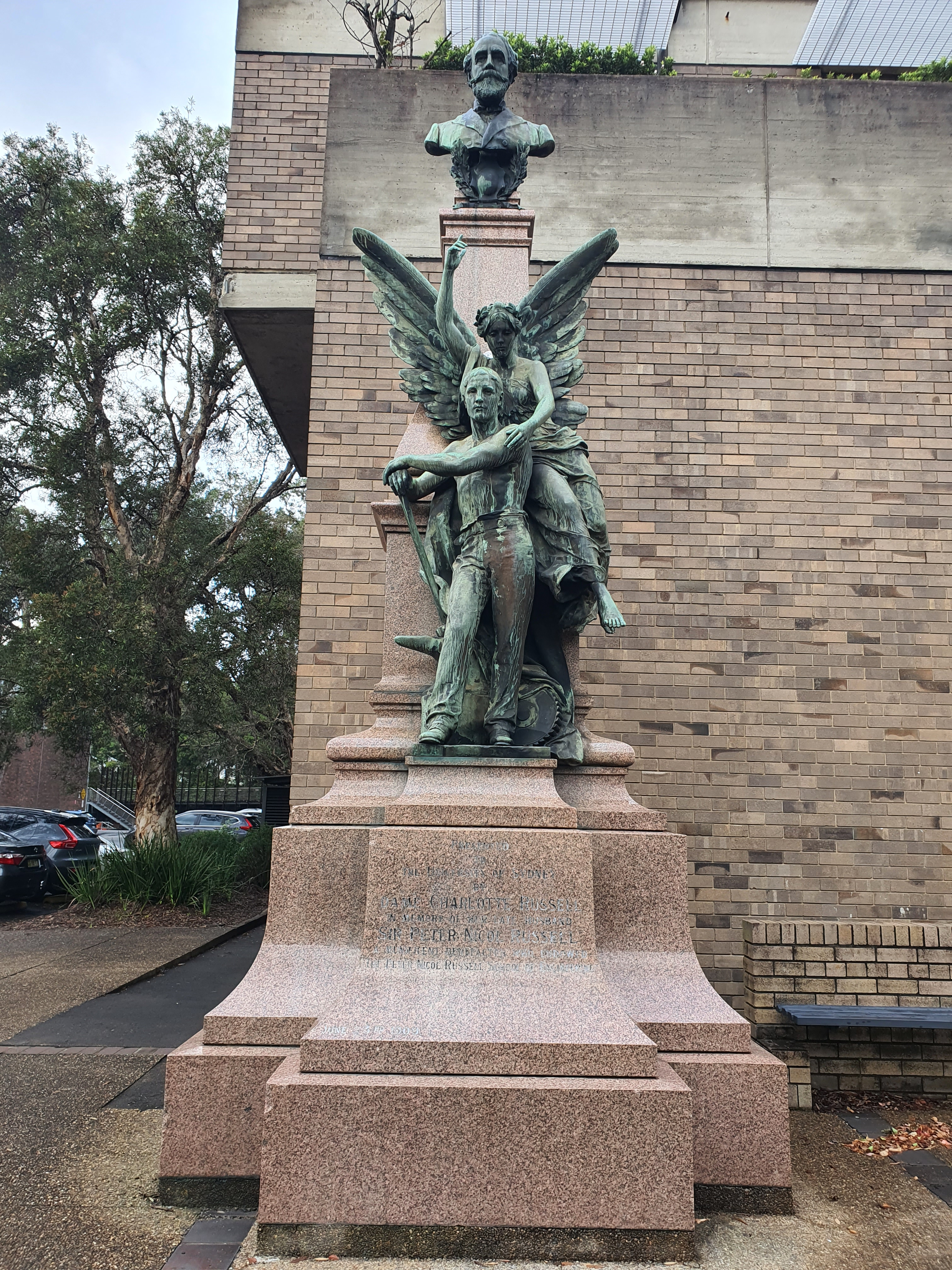
Memorial statue for Russell located adjacent to the School of Chemical and Biomolecular Engineering and the PNR Building at the University of Sydney

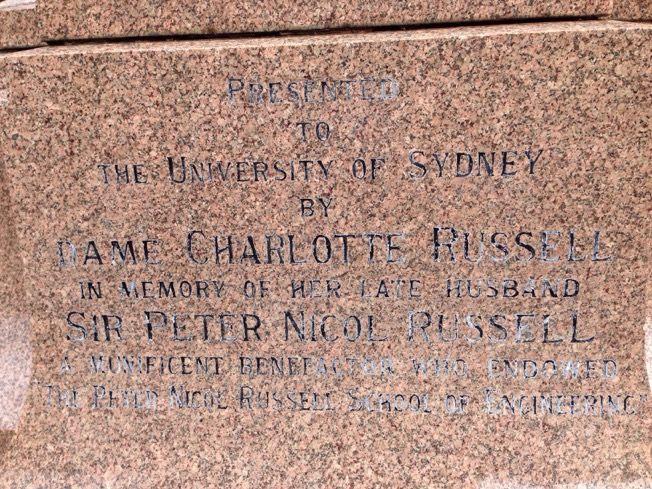
Plaque affixed to the base of the memorial statue for Russell on the grounds of the University of Sydney

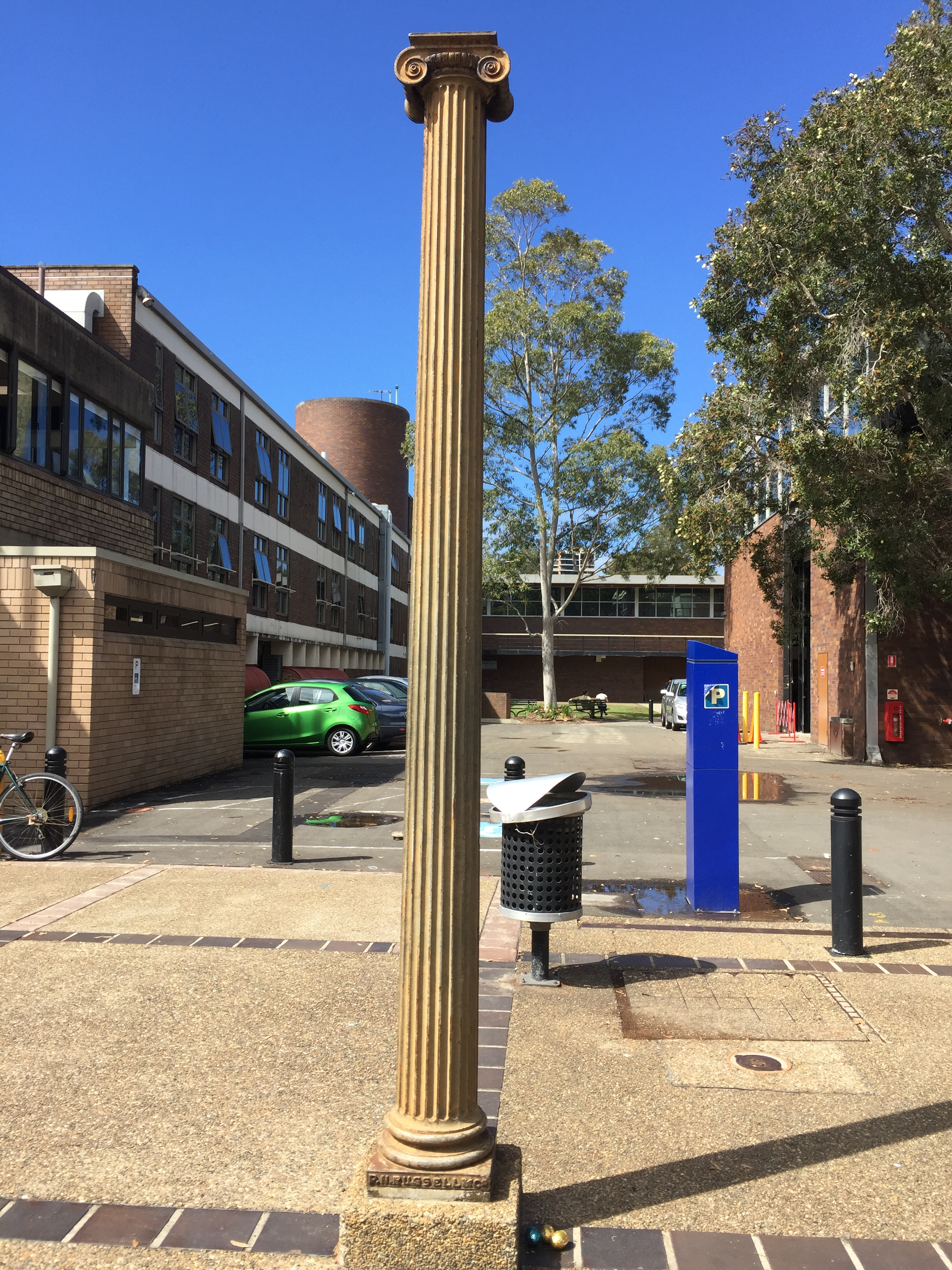
Single-cast iron Ionian-style column, found close to the memorial statue for Russell on the grounds of the University of Sydney

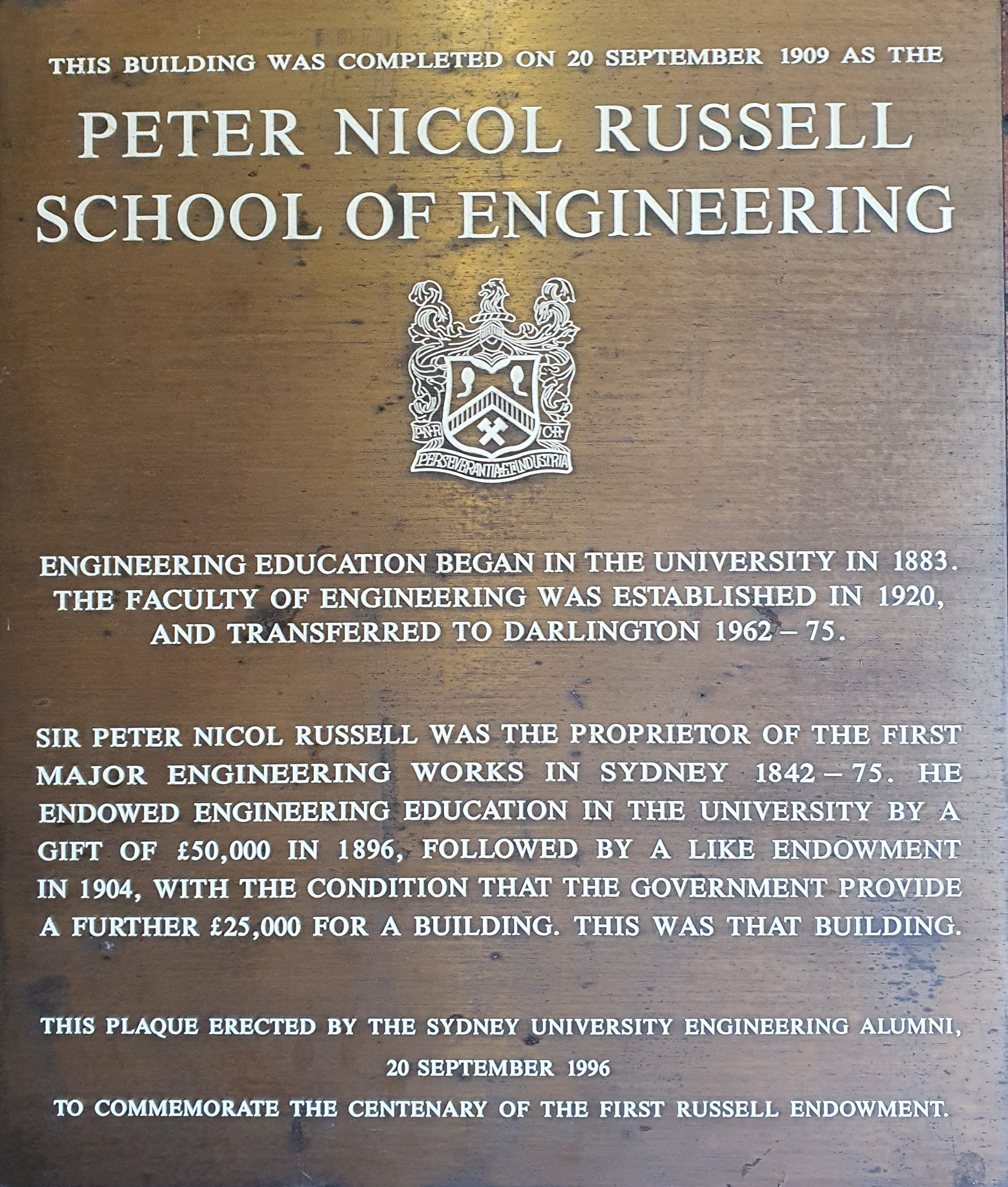
Plaque commemorating the centenary of Russell's £100,000 donation to the School of Engineering, affixed to the northern entrance to the John Woolley Building at the University of Sydney
