= Francis Bell (engineer) =

British railway engineer

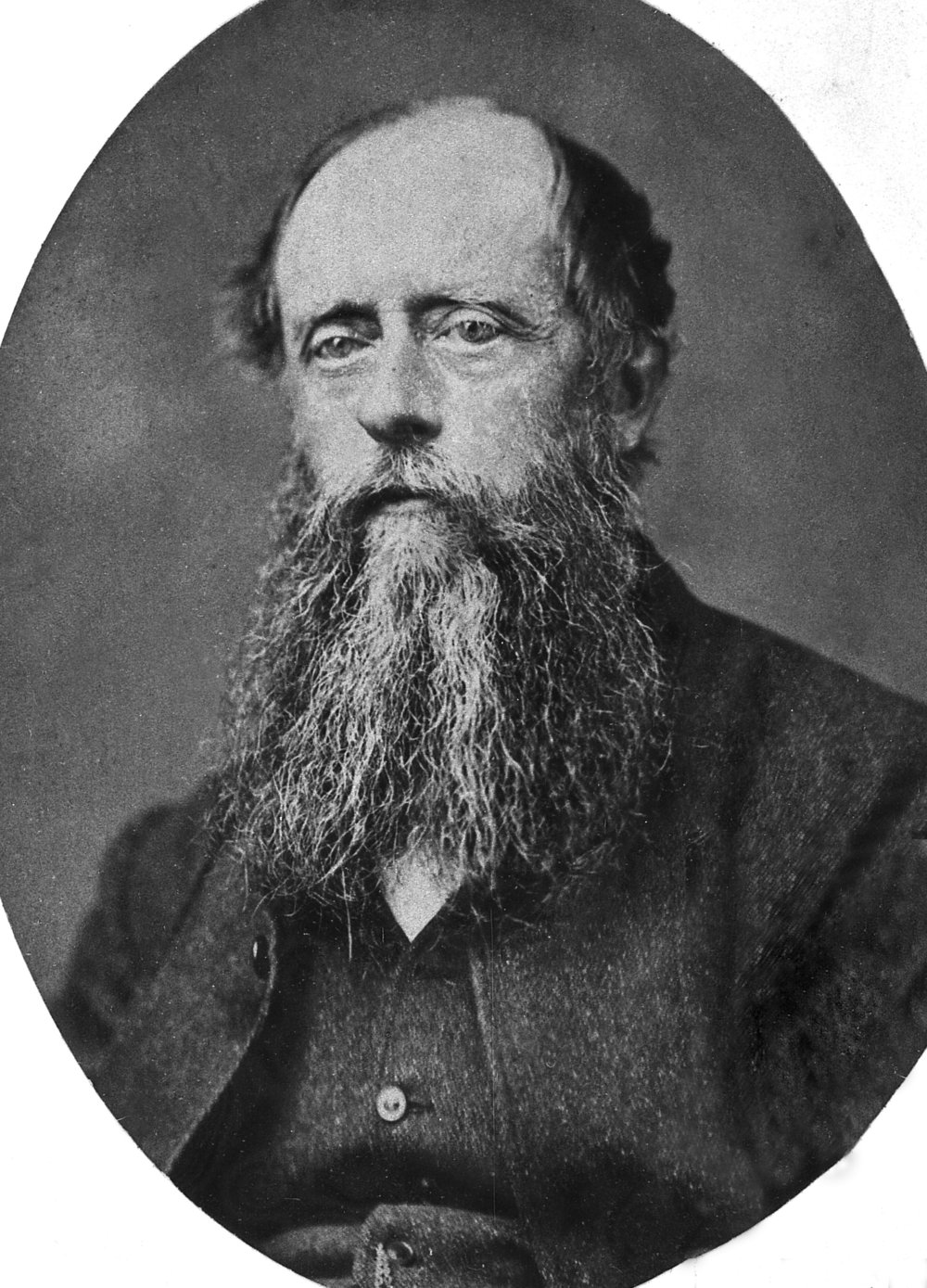
- Francis Bell, in 1872
- Born: c. 1813; Ireland
- Died: 7 September 1879; Petersham, New South Wales
- Resting place: Rookwood Cemetery
- Spouse: Jane Eliza Livingstone
- Parent(s): John Bell (Belfast, Ireland)
- Engineering career
- Discipline: Civil engineer
- Projects: Botany watershed
- Significant design: Geelong Ballaarat and North Western Railway Company; Hawthorn Bridge; Hawthorn Railway Bridge; Melbourne and Essendon Railway; Prince Alfred Bridge; Dunmore Bridge

Francis Bell (c. 1813 – 9 September 1879), was a British railway engineer, who worked extensively in Australia, and was involved in a number of important railway construction projects and bridges.

== Career ==
Bell commenced his engineering career in 1837, building railways in England and Scotland, and also worked under Sir John Macneill MInstCE, on the Great Southern and Western Railway in Ireland.

By 1853, Bell had migrated to Australia and, in January 1854, in Victoria, was the engineer involved in the development of the A£1,000,000 prospectus for the construction of the Geelong–Ballarat railway line. He was also listed as the surveyor for the Colonial Insurance Company, and there are a number of tender advertisements for reinstatement for damaged buildings. In 1855, he presented a well-received paper to the Victorian Institute for the Advancement of Science (later the Royal Society of Victoria) on the merits of iron truss bridges. Other works he designed included 27 kilometres (17 mi) of the railway line from Newcastle to Maitland, prior to 1858, the design and construction of the Melbourne and Essendon Railway in 1859, and works for the Yarra Yarra Mining Company, and Sandridge Lagoon, Port Melbourne.

Bell was responsible for a number of fairly similar wrought iron lattice truss road and rail bridges, several of which were fabricated from components supplied by Messrs. Lloyds, Fosters, and Company's Wednesbury, Old Park Ironworks, Staffordshire. The West Maitland Bridge was the sixth bridge this firm exported for Bell, with the others including the Hawthorn Railway Bridge and Hawthorn Road Bridge over the River Yarra, in Melbourne, the Prince Alfred Bridge at Gundagai, and the Pitnacree and Dunmore bridges in New South Wales.

His expertise was sought for a number of Melbourne civic works projects as he gave evidence to the Victorian Royal Commissions on the River and Harbour Trust in 1858 and 1860, and to the Select Committees on the Railway Department in 1860 and on the Central Railway Terminus in 1861 and in the same year was a member of the Royal Society of Victoria's Sanitary Committee. Bell was a member of the Institution of Civil Engineers (MInstCE).

Bell was City Engineer for the City of Sydney from approximately 1871 to 1879, a member of the Sewerage and Health Board, and was responsible for improving the storage capacity of the Botany watershed and planned a system for sewering the city in the direction of Bondi.

== Personal life ==
Bell was the sixth son of John Bell, of Belfast, Ireland. He was married on 17 June 1858 at the Cathedral, Newcastle, New South Wales to Jane Eliza Livingstone, youngest daughter of Captain Alexander Livingstone of Newcastle. In May 1872, he was living in St. Leonards, on the North Shore of Sydney, when his wife gave birth to a daughter. His youngest daughter married Charles Wade, who, amongst other things, became Premier of NSW in 1907, was the Agent-General for NSW in 1917, and was knighted in 1918.

Bell died in 1879 at his residence in Petersham, Sydney, and was buried at the Rookwood Necropolis.
