= William Bennett (Australian engineer) =

- Born: 4 July 1824; Dublin, Ireland
- Died: 29 September 1889 (aged 65); St Leonards, New South Wales

William Christopher Bennett (4 July 1824 – 29 September 1889) was an Irish born surveyor and engineer active in colonial Australia, Commissioner and Engineer-in-Chief for Roads and Bridges in New South Wales.

== Early life ==
Bennett was born in Dublin, Ireland, the eldest son of Ignatius Bennett, a traffic manager, and his wife Alicia, née Garvey. Bennett was employed as a pupil on various territorial and railway surveys and other works in Ireland from 1840 to 1845, and as assistant engineer in charge of drainage works, under the Board of Public Works in Ireland, from 1845 to 1852.

== Surveyor ==
During 1852–3, Bennett was employed in reporting on the navigation of the Rhone and Saône, and making surveys and reports on the navigation of the Magdalena River, with connecting canals, roads or railways, in New Grenada. Bennett was engaged on the International (French, American and English) Ship Canal Survey at the Darién Gap, in 1854, having charge of the English survey on the Pacific side in the absence of Mr. Forde, M.I.C.E., on which occasion Bennett received the thanks of the American Government for having, in conjunction with Lieut. Forsythe and a party from H.M.S. Virago, relieved Lieut. Isaac Strain, United States navy, and his missing exploring party, at no small personal risk.

== Career in Australia ==
At the end of 1854 Bennett proceeded, viâ New Zealand, to New South Wales, and was for about ten months attached to the Survey Department as an assistant surveyor. In April 1856 he was appointed assistant engineer to the Commission for the Sewerage and Water Supply of Sydney; was engaged in the Railway Department, New South Wales, from January to September 1857, and was then transferred to the Department of Roads, which, as assistant engineer, and ultimately as engineer, he assisted Captain (afterwards Colonel) Ben Hay Martindale, C.B., R.E., in organising. Bennett left the colony for Europe in January 1861, and on his return he was appointed, in November 1862, commissioner and engineering-chief for roads, New South Wales, which office he occupied until a short time before his death. Bennett designed the Prince Alfred Bridge over the Murrumbidgee River, and was engineer for the Denison Bridge over the Macquarie River, New South Wales. Bennett was also occasionally employed on the western goldfields and narrow gauge railways, the water supply of Sydney, and the drainage of the Hunter River. Bennett died on 29 September 1889, at the age of sixty-five in St Leonards, New South Wales.
