= University of Sydney Faculty of Engineering =

Faculty of Engineering
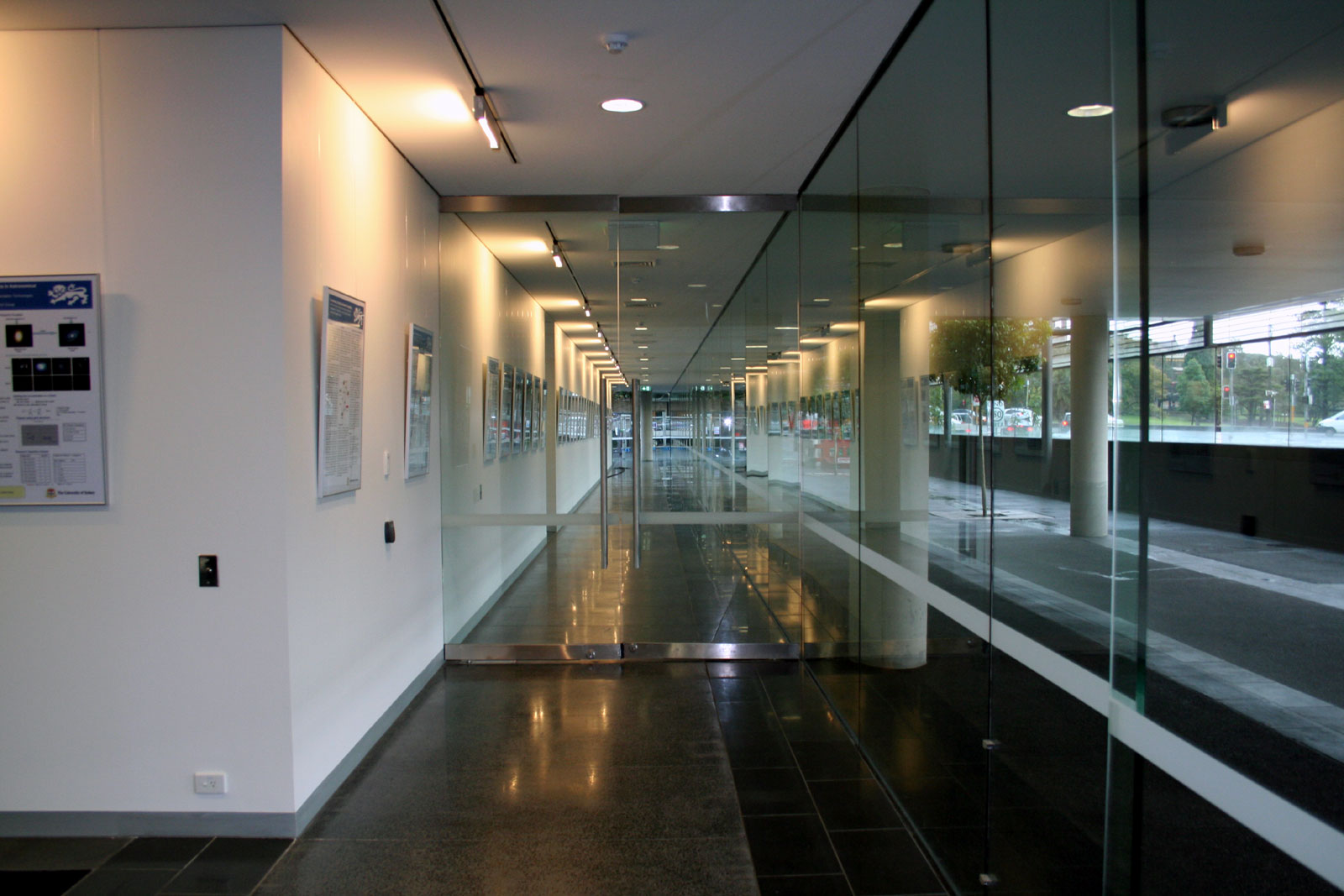
- Computer Science Building
- Type: Public
- Established: 1920
- Affiliations: University of Sydney
- Dean: Professor Hesham El Gamal
- Location: Camperdown / Darlington, New South Wales, Australia
- Website: sydney.edu.au/engineering/

The Faculty of Engineering is a faculty of the University of Sydney, Australia. It was established in 1920 and is one of the oldest engineering schools in Australia.

The Faculty of Engineering has an excellent global academic reputation, and is ranked 14th in the world for Civil and Structural Engineering and 42nd in the world for Computer Science as per the 2020 QS World University Rankings by Subject.

Programs within the Faculty of Engineering are accredited by professional bodies including Engineers Australia, the Project Management Institute and the Australian Computer Society.

== History ==
Teaching of engineering at the University began in 1883 within the Faculty of Science established just a year prior. The Faculty of Engineering itself was established in 1920.

Initially engineering classes were taught in the University Quadrangle. In 1909, the P. N. Russell School of Engineering (now known as the Woolley Building) was completed. This building, an outcome of the P. N. Russell benefactions was formally opened by the Governor on 20 September 1909. With the expansion in student numbers in the 1950s and early 1960s, new purpose-built facilities were constructed in the Darlington extension area across City Road and since the mid seventies all departments have been accommodated in this area, although a wind tunnel in the Woolley Building is still in use by Aeronautical Engineering.

The new SciTech Library opened in the Darlington engineering precinct in 2010, as the amalgamation of the Architecture, Engineering, Madsen and Mathematics libraries, brought together as part of the Campus 2010 project.

== Faculty schools ==
- School of Aerospace, Mechanical and Mechatronic Engineering
- School of Biomedical Engineering
- School of Chemical and Biomolecular Engineering
- School of Civil Engineering
- School of Computer Science
- School of Electrical and Information Engineering
- School of Project Management

== Research centres ==
- Australian Centre for Field Robotics
- Australian Centre for Microscopy and Microanalysis
- Centre for Advanced Food Engineering
- Centre for Advanced Materials Technology
- Centre for Advanced Structural Engineering
- Centre for Distributed and High-Performance Computing
- Centre for Future Energy Networks
- Centre for IoT and Telecommunications
- Centre for Sustainable Energy Development
- Centre for Wind, Waves and Water
- John Grill Institute for Project Leadership
- Rio Tinto Centre for Mine Automation
- Sydney Artificial Intelligence Centre
- Sydney Centre in Geomechanics and Mining Materials
- Sydney Institute of Robotics and Intelligent Systems
- The Warren Centre for Advanced Engineering
- Australian Centre for Robotics
- Machine Learning Research Network
- Sydney Blockchain Group
- Waste Transformation Hub
- Updated list of ARC Centres and Hubs

== Notable alumni ==
- John Bradfield - designer of Sydney Harbour Bridge
- Paul Scully-Power - Australia's first Astronaut
- Michael Hintze - billionaire hedge fund manager and philanthropist
- David Higgins - CEO of Network Rail and former CEO of Lend Lease
- John Grill - billionaire founder of WorleyParsons
