= Prince Alfred Bridge =

1860s wrought iron truss bridge in Gundagai

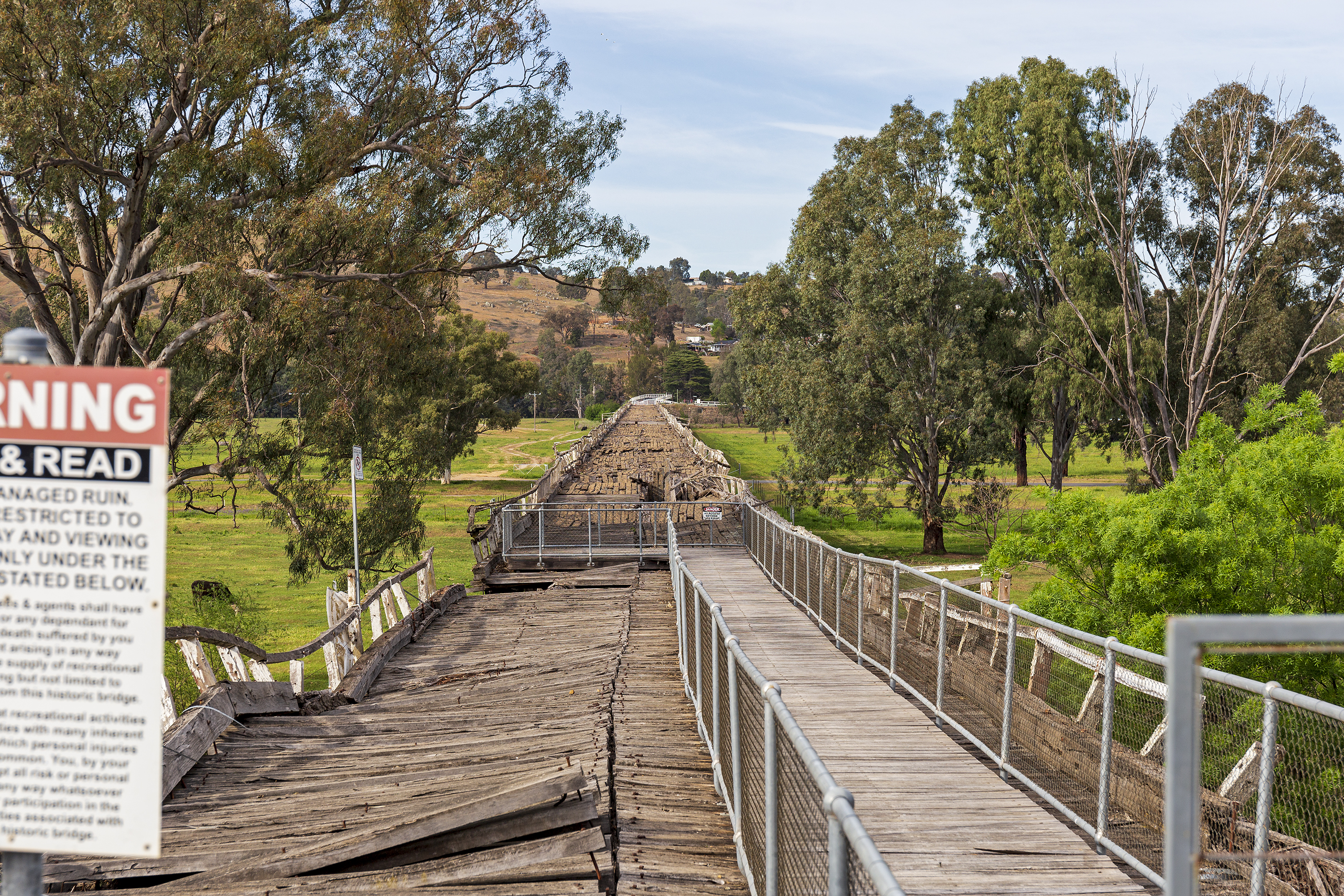
- Wooden viaduct, looking south, in October 2019
- Coordinates: 35°04′28″S 148°06′25″E
- Crosses: Murrumbidgee River
- Locale: Middleton Drive, Gundagai, Cootamundra-Gundagai Regional Council, New South Wales, Australia
- Owner: Transport for NSW (iron bridge); Crown Lands (timber viaduct)

Characteristics
- Design: Warren truss
- Material: Wrought iron
- Trough construction: Timber beam approaches
- Pier construction: Cast iron cylindrical
- Total length: 922 metres (3,025 ft)
- Width: 6 metres (21 ft)
- Longest span: 3 x 31 metres (103 ft)
- No. of spans: 4
- Piers in water: 2
- Clearance below: 12 metres (40 ft)

History
- Architect: William Christopher Bennett
- Constructed by: Francis Bell
- Built: 1864–1867
- Opened: 17 October 1867 (Toll levied)
- Closed: 1984 (Timber viaduct closed to road and pedestrian traffic), Iron bridge still in use.
- Replaced by: Sheahan Bridge (1977)

Statistics

New South Wales Heritage Register
- Official name: Prince Alfred Bridge - Iron Road Bridge; Iron Bridge over Murrumbidgee River at Gundagai
- Type: State heritage (built)
- Designated: 5 July 2019
- Reference no.: 2022
- Type: Road Bridge
- Category: Transport – Land
- Builders: Francis Bell

Location
- Interactive map of Prince Alfred Bridge

The Prince Alfred Bridge is a wrought iron truss and timber beam road bridge over the Murrumbidgee River and its floodplain at Middleton Drive, Gundagai, Cootamundra-Gundagai Regional Council, New South Wales, Australia. The name originally applied to the iron truss bridge over the river and some 800 metres of timber beam bridge across the floodplain but most of the timber beam sections have been demolished. The heritage-listed road bridge was designed by William Christopher Bennett and built from 1864 to 1867 by Francis Bell. It is also known as Prince Alfred Bridge – Iron Road Bridge and Iron Bridge over Murrumbidgee River at Gundagai. The iron bridge is owned by Transport for NSW and the timber viaduct was owned by Crown Lands. The bridge was added to the New South Wales State Heritage Register on 5 July 2019 and on the (now defunct) Register of the National Estate on 21 March 1978.

In 1977, the 1,143-metre-long (3,750 ft) Sheahan Bridge replaced the Prince Alfred Bridge as the Hume Highway crossing of the Murrumbidgee River. The Sheahan Bridge was duplicated in 2010. Since the opening of the Sheahan Bridge, the Prince Alfred Bridge has served local traffic only. The timber spans on the Prince Alfred Bridge deteriorated to such an extent that the 1896 side ramp had to be reinstated, leaving most of the northern approach disused, after which it deteriorated to the point where it was closed to vehicular traffic and pedestrians and later demolished. The portion that remains in use consists of the wrought iron truss spans and a small number of timber spans at each end,

== Etymology ==
The bridge was named for the then reigning Queen Victoria's son, Prince Alfred, Duke of Saxe-Coburg and Gotha, and was built to carry the Great Southern Road (now the Hume Highway) across the Murrumbidgee. It has existed in three forms, with only the main spans across the river itself being common to all three.

== History ==
The site was historically known as the "crossing place" and is where Charles Sturt first crossed the Murrumbidgee. It became known in the mid-19th century as the safest location to cross the river. Periodic flooding of the Murrumbidgee had already had detrimental effects on the pioneering settlement of Gundagai, situated on the floodplain. In 1852 almost 100 people were drowned in a severe flood. By 1853 a new town site had been chosen on the high ground north of the floodplain and its main street, Sheridan Street, became part of the Great South Road, subsequently the original Hume Highway until it was bypassed in 1977.

On 30 January 1861 The Sydney Morning Herald reported that the NSW Legislative Assembly had rejected a motion for a road bridge at Gundagai due to lack of funds and lack of evidence of a need. A public meeting was held in September at the Gundagai Court House and resolutions from the meeting together with a subsequent petition from the district were forwarded to Sydney for consideration by the NSW Government.

The river crossing had become a major obstacle for travellers and teams following the Hume and Hovell route to the Riverina and Victoria, and there had been regular petitions and deputations to the Colonial Government for a bridge. Successive governments deferred on the grounds of low traffic flows and the high cost of any bridge project to cross the half-mile flood plain, but political and commercial factors forced the Government's hand. The merchants at Wagga Wagga favoured trade with Victoria since that colony's railway had reached Echuca in 1864, and they accused the distant Sydney-based Government of neglect. They formed a joint-stock company and built a substantial three span timber bridge over the Murrumbidgee River in order to direct traffic from the surrounding districts through the town. It was reported that as a financial speculation the bridge has proved successful. A similar bridge had been erected over the Murray River at Albury. The NSW Government was forced to act in order to turn the flow of wealth towards Sydney. Not only was a bridge planned, but an expensive iron structure was approved as a clear indication to the south-western districts of the Government's legitimate interests in those regions.

In late 1861, the Government placed A£24,000 in the estimates for a modest scheme with a short viaduct, which would have left the floodplain impassable during a flood. However, in 1864 the estimate was increased to A£37,000 for the whole river flat to be bridged. The Prince Alfred Bridge over the Murrumbidgee River was opened on 24 October 1867 and named after Queen Victoria's second son who was touring Australia that year. It was the first metal truss bridge to be built in NSW. A short sloping viaduct descended to join the road over the river flats until the long timber viaduct was complete in 1869.

In England in 1848, James Warren and Willoughby Monzani had obtained a British patent for a configuration of repetitive equilateral triangles that could support a road on either its top or bottom chord. Warren's name became synonymous with this form. The first major spans using this configuration were built in England, and English construction firms built prefabricated versions for use in the British colonies, especially India. Thomas Kennard then applied a more detailed analysis of the stress distribution, allowing further economy in the use of iron by varying the cross-sectional area of the top and bottom chords without adversely affecting strength. Kennard patented his invention in 1853, and it was the Warren and Kennard patent that was used by Bennett in his design of the Prince Alfred Bridge.

According to Bennett, the Warren girder had been adopted, because it required the least workmanship on the ground, and because of the rapidity with which it could be erected, incurring least risk from the violent floods of the Murrumbidgee during construction. However, Bennett, along with many other engineers of his day, considered the lattice truss superior. The main objection to the Warren truss was that all the strains are taken by a single pin, whereas in the lattice system the strain is divided amongst a number of rivets instead. Francis Bell, the contractor, also preferred the wrought iron lattice, which, he said, could be imported from England and launched into position very economically. For these (among other) reasons, very few Warren truss bridges were constructed during this period. The iron for the superstructure was furnished by Messrs Lloyds, Fosters, and Company's Wednesbury, Old Park Ironworks in Staffordshire, and was inspected by eminent engineer Mr. Fowler. Testing of the wrought iron was conducted, and the strength was found to be much in excess of the specification. The testing in England of the first span for the bridge was also reported as very satisfactory; the deflection with a load did not exceed an inch.

In 1848, three Sydney businessmen had joined a local man in an attempt to exploit the iron resources of the Nattai district, which became the Fitzroy Iron Works. The Fitzroy Iron Works were the first ironworks in Australia, but their story is one of persistent failure over half a century despite numerous and repeated ambitious, entrepreneurial and optimistic attempts. For finished products (cast or rolled), land or water transport to an English port plus sea freight to Sydney were less than the cost of cartage between Mittagong and Sydney. Pig iron, also, could not compete against British iron, mostly brought out as ballast in wool ships.

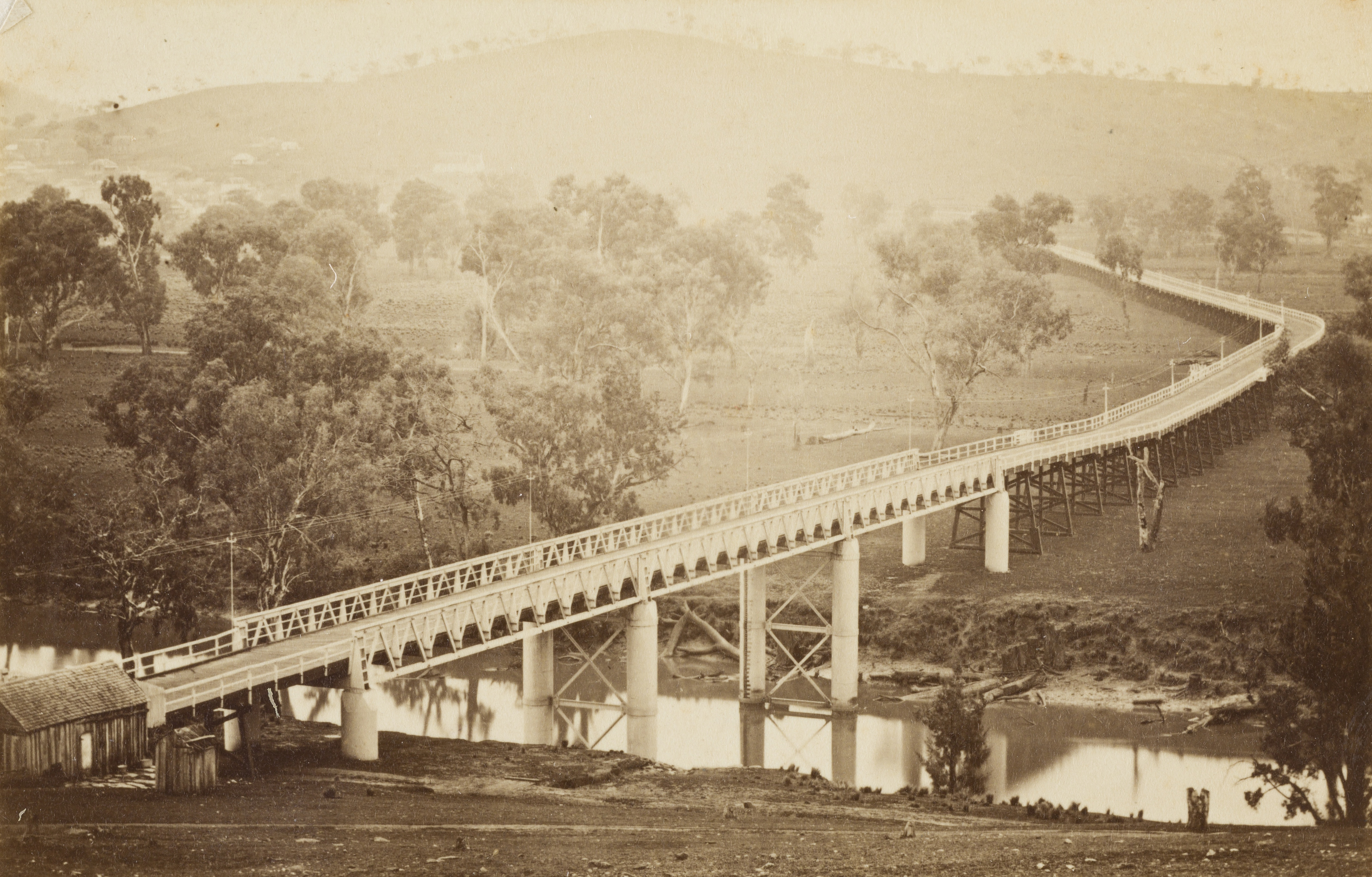
Prince Albert Road Bridge, Murrumbidgee River, Gundagai, New South Wales, 1877

The Prince Alfred Bridge, with the Denison Bridge at Bathurst, has the distinction of being one of only two early Australian bridges that contained Australian iron. While the iron for the piers of Denison Bridge at Bathurst was cast at P. N. Russell & Co's Foundry in Sydney from pig iron obtained from the Fitzroy Iron Works, the cast iron piers at Gundagai were cast by the Fitzroy Iron Works from largely local iron. The piers are therefore a rare example of a substantial finished product produced completely by the Fitzroy Ironworks at Mittagong.

The four pairs of cast iron cylindrical columns for the piers were made at the Fitzroy Iron Works in 56 sections. Each was two metres (six feet) long, two metres (six feet) in diameter, with a 29-millimetre (1.125 in) wall thickness and each weighed approximately one point eight tonnes; one point eight long tons (two short tons). They were delivered by bullock drays, although delays occurred in carting the cylinders to Gundagai because scarcity of feed and water between Yass and Gundagai deterred carriers from undertaking the work.

When a 2-metre (6 ft) section of cylinder was placed in its required position, the material inside and under the cutting edge was excavated by hand, causing the cylinder to sink under its own weight. As the cylinder descended, additional lengths were added with internal bolted connections until the necessary depth or foundation had been reached. The hollow cylinder was then filled with rubble consisting of red sandy soil with the odd stone. An immense amount of difficulty was at first experienced in reaching the necessary depth; borings to a great depth had to be made, through huge masses of timber brought down by floods in bygone ages, but the indomitable energy of the superintending engineer, Frederick Augustus Franklin, overcame every obstacle. Franklin, who worked for Francis Bell, was well regarded and gained the cordial good wishes and esteem of the people of Gundagai by his work.

The design for the three iron truss spans of the Prince Alfred Bridge are based on the British pin-jointed Warren and Kennard trusses, and have the unique feature of the trusses being suspended from a continuous horizontal top chord, supported on roller bearings on vertical posts at each pier. The end roller detail has five rollers placed between the extended upper chord and a pillar which rises from the pier top. A similar detail is provided at the central pier, where each upper chord is continued from one span to the next across a nest of rollers. The Warren truss, as originally patented, consisted of a configuration of repetitive equilateral triangles but the Prince Alfred Bridge has additional verticals at each cross girder location, designed to provide lateral support to the top chord. It and the railway truss downstream (constructed more than 30 years later) are two of only three pin-jointed metal trusses remaining in NSW - the other is the Whipple truss road bridge at Nowra.

The deck on the truss spans originally consisted of two 5-centimetre (2 in) thick layers of diagonal decking, the upper layer being approximately at right angles to the lower layer. The deck was finished with a light curved iron kerb, similar to the kerb which still exists on Denison Bridge (see photo). This arrangement of deck for the truss spans was retained when Percy Allan designed the new northern viaduct which was constructed in 1898, but by 1932, there was just a single layer of transverse decking on the truss spans similar to the viaduct approaches, and a timber kerb rather than the original iron kerb.

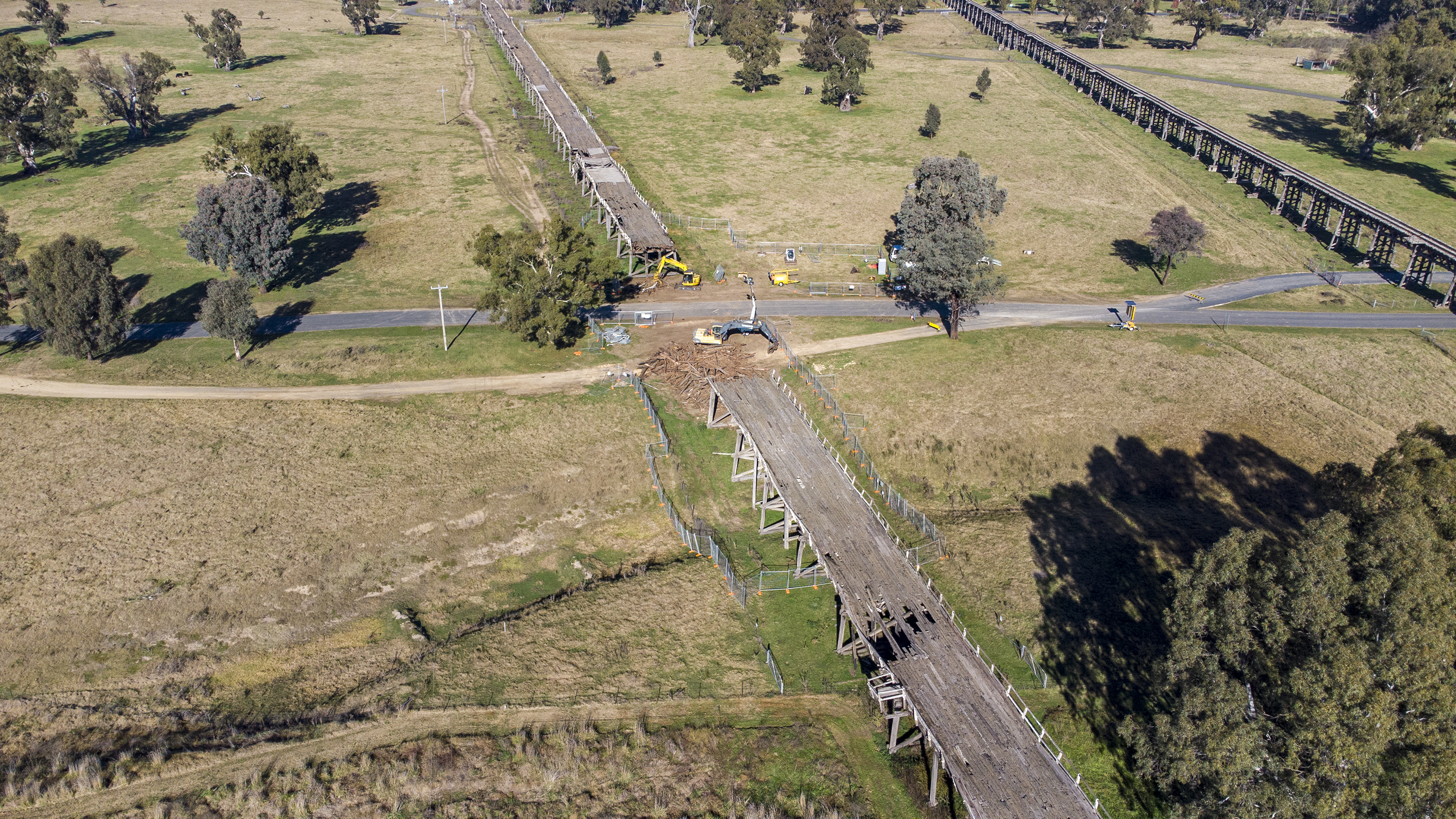
Aerial view of the sections removed over O. I. Bell Drive in May 2021

By 1932, it was thought that, "the iron spans, then being sixty-five years old, could hardly be relied upon for a further period of service much in excess of thirty years (the average expected life of a timber girder span as used on viaducts), which would bring them to an age of practically 100 years. Apart from not being heavy enough to carry the present-day standard bridge loading, old age had probably affected the iron and caused some loss of strength." However, after considering a number of options for a new bridge it was admitted that, 'It was plain that the existing iron trusses, though light and of unusual design, viewed from the aspect of modern structural practice, were in good order and were capable of rendering efficient service for the life of at least one more timber approach.'

Since that time, the timber deck has changed arrangement a number of times, and the ironwork has been painted with a number of different systems (originally white, now grey). In the early 1960s a footway was added to one side of the bridge, which remains today. Good design and quality construction have given a durable bridge able to carry much heavier loads that originally intended or foreseen, and for much longer than had been imagined.

Located on the main Sydney to Melbourne route, the Prince Alfred Bridge carried huge volumes of traffic in its lifetime until 1977 when the Hume Highway was realigned to bypass Gundagai with the construction of Sheahan Bridge. The Prince Alfred Bridge continued to carry local traffic over the Murrumbidgee River between North and South Gundagai; until it was declared unsafe for vehicular and pedestrian traffic.

Two spans of the wooden viaduct over O I Bell Drive and a span over Landon Street were demolished in May 2021 due to safety concerns, as the sections had significantly deteriorated.

Due to further significant deterioration, the remainder of the timber viaduct was demolished in November 2021 due to the significant safety risk that the deteriorated timber viaduct posed to the public.

== Description ==
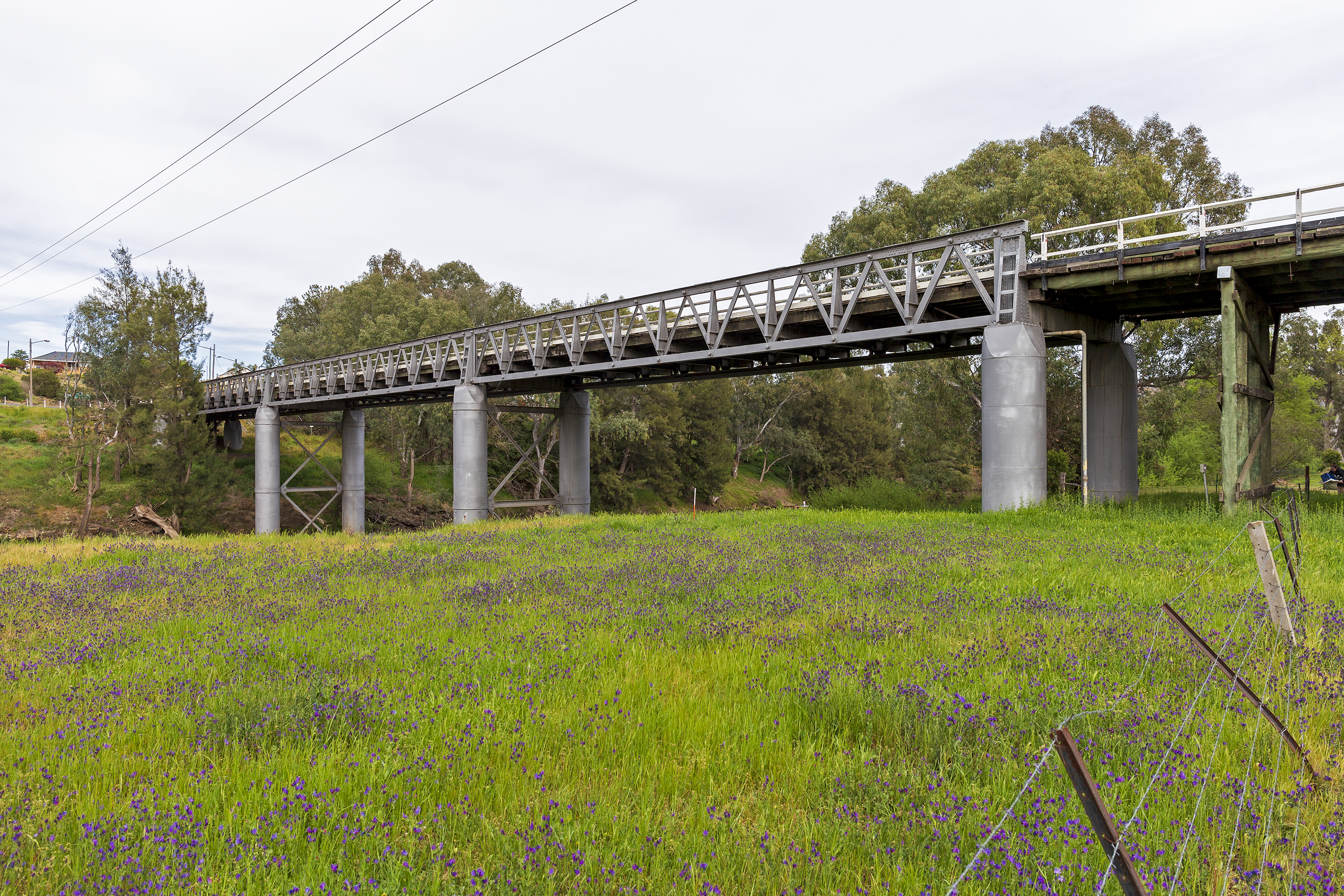
Prince Alfred Bridge over the Murrumbidgee River

The Prince Alfred Bridge over the Murrumbidgee River is a three span, wrought iron, pin jointed Warren truss on cast iron cylindrical piers. A Warren truss, as originally patented, consists of a configuration of repetitive equilateral triangles that support a road on either the top or bottom chord. The trusses of the Prince Alfred Bridge have additional verticals at each cross girder location, designed to provide lateral support to the top chord. The trusses are suspended from a continuous horizontal top chord, supported on a nest of five rollers located on vertical pillars attached to the top of each pier. The four cylindrical cast iron piers are filled with soil and stones. The trusses support a timber deck, which carries two lanes of traffic. Longitudinal timber sheeting was added to the deck in 1959, and a footway was added on the outside of the truss in the early 1960s.

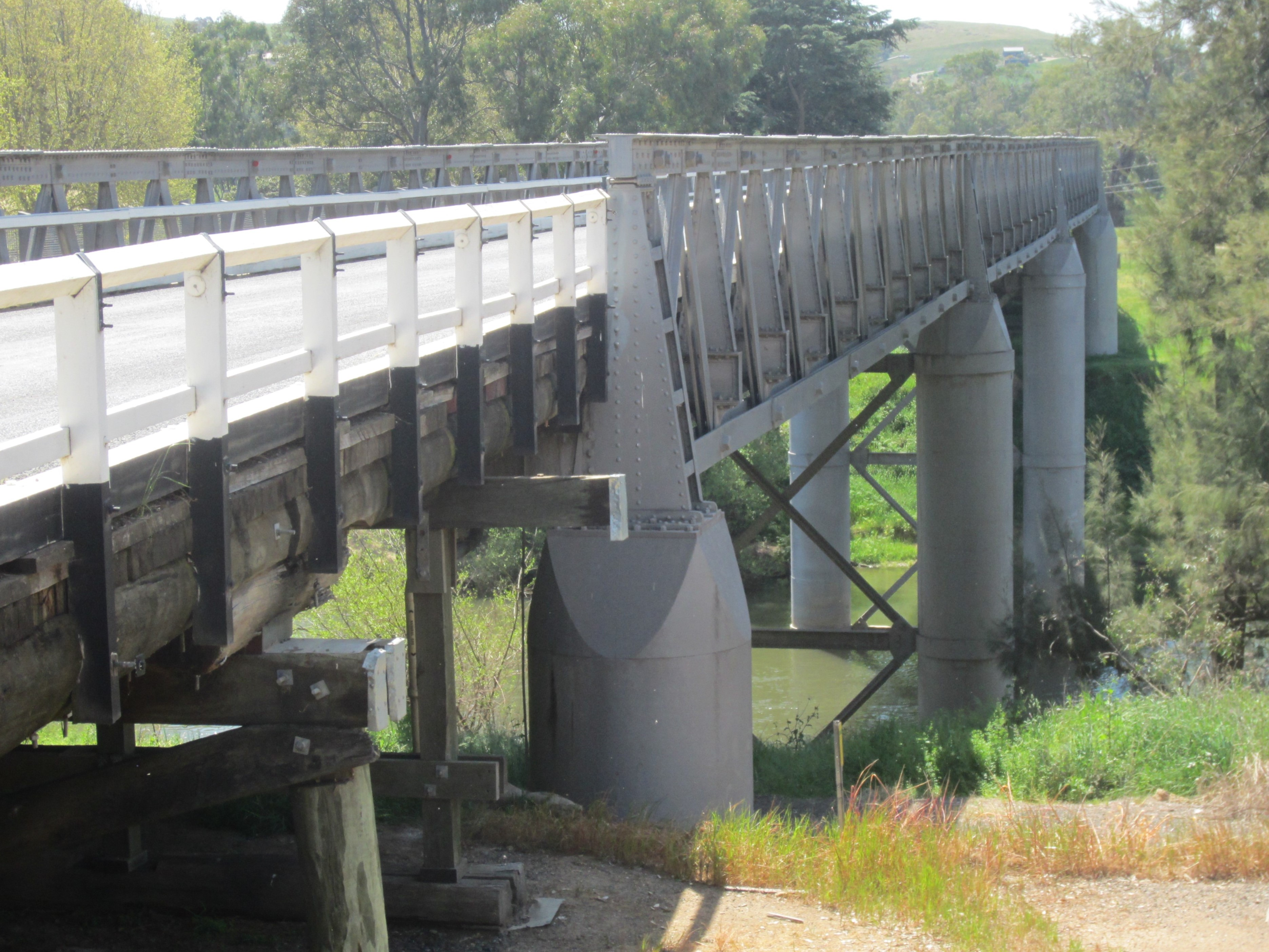
Prince Alfred Bridge, from southern bank of the Murrumbidgee River (Oct. 2019), showing supporting columns and spans with wrought-iron truss. Note how the truss is suspended from rollers under the horizontal top chord.

As opened in 1867 the bridge had a total length of 314 metres (1,030 ft), consisting of three wrought iron truss spans each of 31 metres (103 ft) across the river, two timber southern approach spans each of 9 metres (30 ft), and twenty-three timber northern approach spans each of 9 metres (30 ft), rising on a gradient of 1 in 30 from the level of the floodplain.

It was the first iron truss bridge to be built in New South Wales, The pin-jointed Warren truss section is the second-oldest metal truss bridge in Australia. It was designed by William Bennett, Engineer and Commissioner for Roads and constructed by Francis Bell. The trusses were assembled from iron work imported from England. The cylinderical casings for the supporting columns were cast at the Fitzroy Iron Works at Mittagong, using iron smelted from locally-mined ore in their blast furnace. There were 56 cylindrical castings weighing between 2.04 and 2.27 tonnes; 2.01 and 2.23 long tons (2.25 and 2.5 short tons) each - with one cylinder being three metres (nine feet) long, two metres (six feet) in diameter, with a wall-thickness of 3 centimetres (1.125 in). The columns were sunk through alluvial deposits to a foundation in coarse gravel and detached pieces of rock, the deepest being founded about 9 metres (30 ft) below low water level.

After the opening, work continued with construction of the rest of the high-level bridge with work expected to finish within eight months. The second configuration of the bridge was built by the twenty-three northern approach spans being replaced by a much longer structure which spanned the full width of the floodplain. It consisted of 105 timber spans varying from 5 to 9 metres (15 to 30 ft) long, but as far back as 1932 the details of this configuration of the bridge had been lost, and no further details are known, other than the fact that it was 12.2 metres (40 ft) longer than the bridge which replaced it.

In 1896 the third configuration of the bridge was completed. The northern spans and southern approach spans were all replaced. The northern spans were replaced by seventy-five spans of 11 metres (35 ft) and one of 9 metres (28 ft), one of the longest timber beam bridges in Australia. The alignment of this new approach was slightly to the west of the previous (second) northern approach. The two southern spans of 9 metres (30 ft) dating from 1865 were replaced by one span of 11 metres (35 ft) and one of 9 metres (28 ft) on the same alignment as the previous southern approach spans.

In addition a side ramp was built on the western side in 1896, leading down from the bridge six spans north of the main spans down to ground level of the floodplain beneath the approach spans, as it had already become necessary to reduce wear and tear on the timber approach spans. After the 1896 reconstruction the bridge had a total length of 922 metres (3,025 ft), and remained the longest bridge in New South Wales until the opening of the Sydney Harbour Bridge in 1932.

=== Condition ===
As at 13 April 2016, the wrought iron is in excellent condition considering its age. There is minor section loss due to corrosion, but the loss is not substantially affecting the load carrying capacity of the bridge. A few of the iron castings supporting the cross girders are broken. The portions of the cast iron piers which are below water have been subject to graphitisation (a form of corrosion leading to loss of strength), as is common in cast iron river piers. This does affect capacity, but is not yet causing signs of distress for this bridge. Archaeological potential is low.

=== Further information ===
The integrity of the Prince Alfred Bridges is excellent. The original cast iron piers and wrought iron trusses are clearly visible. Although the arrangement of the deck has changed over the years, it is still timber as it was originally. The footway added in the 1960s restricts views to the trusses from some viewing angles. Timber deck changes throughout the life of the bridge (both fabric and form), addition of footway in the early 1960s, repainting throughout the life of the bridge.

== Heritage listing ==
As at 13 April 2016, the Prince Alfred Bridge is of State heritage significance for its historical values as the first iron truss bridge to be built in New South Wales and the second-oldest metal truss bridge remaining in Australia. In addition it is of significance for its rarity as it is one of only three pin jointed metal trusses remaining in New South Wales. Its historical values include the fact that the cast iron piers were cast in at the Fitzroy Iron Works, the first ironworks in Australia, chiefly from local ores. The Bridge and the piers therefore provides an irreplaceable source of information on the quality and techniques used by Australia's first ironworks and demonstrate the technical achievements of the colony of NSW in producing its own iron. The construction of the bridge was a significant development in the history and development of NSW as it provided easy access to Sydney therefore channeling the resources and wealth of the Riverina district north to Sydney to the benefit of New South Wales rather than south to Melbourne and Victoria

The state level heritage significance of the Prince Alfred Bridge is enhanced through its important association with inland road transport and communications between Sydney and Melbourne. The bridge is also associated with a visit to Australia by the Duke of Edinburgh in 1867 afterwhom the bridge was named. In addition the bridge is associated with two eminent engineers, William Christopher Bennett the designer and Francis Bell the Contractor.

Technically the bridge is of state heritage significance as it demonstrates some unique engineering elements such as the support arrangements, consisting of vertical pillars at each pier, having the trusses suspended from the top chords, resting on a nest of roller bearings. The Prince Alfred Bridge is of state heritage significance for its landmark qualities as an integral part of the overall historic vista which includes the iron bridge, the long timber viaduct and adjacent rail bridge. These are a widely recognisable part of the built environment in Gundagai and have a place in the experience and memories of travellers between Sydney and Melbourne from its opening in 1867 until its closure in 1977.

The Prince Alfred Bridge is of state heritage significance for its special value to the engineering profession, particularly for the history of metal bridge design and construction in New South Wales.

Prince Alfred Bridge was listed on the New South Wales State Heritage Register on 5 July 2019 having satisfied the following criteria.

The place is important in demonstrating the course, or pattern, of cultural or natural history in New South Wales.

The Prince Alfred Bridge - iron road bridge is of state heritage significance as it is the second-oldest metal truss bridge in Australia and the oldest in NSW. It formed part of the longest bridge in New South Wales (922 metres (3,025 ft)) until the completion of the Sydney Harbour Bridge in 1932. The Prince Alfred Bridge is important in the history of the development of inland road transport and provides evidence of significant early engineering activity in the Riverina. It also demonstrates the early importance of the Sydney to Melbourne route.

The place has a strong or special association with a person, or group of persons, of importance of cultural or natural history of New South Wales's history.

The state heritage significance of the bridge is enhanced through its associated with two eminent engineers William Christopher Bennet and Francis Bell.

William Christopher Bennett, Irish born engineer, designed the iron bridge. After arriving in Australia Bennett quickly rose to the position of commissioner and chief engineer in the Roads Department (appointed in 1860), a position he retained until 1889. Bennett and his Department constructed 16,000km of road and 64 km of bridges. In addition to his prodigious work on roads and bridges in New South Wales, Bennett also made a significant contribution to navigation, water supply and sewerage works. In 1872 Sir Henry Parkes commended Bennett and his work with the department saying he was "one of the ablest officers in the government service"

Francis Bell was another engineer who was born in Ireland By 1853 Bell had migrated to Australia, and was first involved in a number of significant engineering projects in Victoria. His expertise was such that he was often requested to give evidence to the Victorian Royal Commissions on the River and Harbour Trust, to Select Committees on the Railway Department and the Central Railway Terminus. He was involved in constructing a number of iron truss bridges including the earliest substantial metal truss bridge in Australia, the Hawthorne Bridge over the Yarra in Melbourne. Bell was City Engineer for the City of Sydney from 1871 to 1879, and was a member of the Sewerage and Health Board.

The place is important in demonstrating aesthetic characteristics and/or a high degree of creative or technical achievement in New South Wales.

The Prince Alfred Bridge is of state heritage significance as is an important work of a prominent designer, William Christopher Bennett, who made use of the design technology that was patented in England less than 15 years before the opening of the bridge (1853 the Warren and Kennard patent). Bennett's innovations include the support arrangements for the trusses, consisting of vertical pillars at each pier to support the trusses from the top chord, and the introduction of additional vertical elements designed to provide lateral support to the top chord. The Prince Alfred Bridge also demonstrates the technical achievements of the colony of New South Wales in discovering, mining, smelting and manufacturing the cast iron piers.

The Prince Alfred Bridge is of state heritage significance for its landmark qualities as an integral part of the overall historic vista which includes the iron bridge, the long timber viaduct and adjacent rail bridge. These are a widely recognisable part of the built environment in Gundagai and have a place in the experience and memories of travellers between Sydney and Melbourne from its opening in 1867 until its closure in 1977.

The place has a strong or special association with a particular community or cultural group in New South Wales for social, cultural or spiritual reasons.

The item is of state heritage significance as it has special value to the engineering profession throughout the state, as demonstrated by the Engineers Australia Historic Engineering Marker. It also has a special association with travellers between Sydney and Melbourne, having carried Hume Highway traffic for over 100 years. Since the realignment of the Highway in 1977, the historic features of the bridge with its viaduct have been successfully promoted such that it, along with the rail bridge and its viaduct, is a prominent tourist attraction.

The place has potential to yield information that will contribute to an understanding of the cultural or natural history of New South Wales.

It meets this criterion of State significance because the cast iron cylinders for the piers were made with the earliest Australian iron, cast in The Fitzroy Ironworks which were the first ironworks in Australia. The pier cylinders are therefore an irreplaceable source of information on the quality and techniques of Australia's first ironworks.

The place possesses uncommon, rare or endangered aspects of the cultural or natural history of New South Wales.

The bridge is of state heritage significance as it is one of only two early Australian bridges built with Australian iron (Denison Bridge at Bathurst is the other). It is also one of only three pin jointed metal trusses still extant in NSW (the others being the Whipple truss road bridge at Nowra and the Gundagai rail bridge, no longer in use). It is a British pin-jointed truss of a type that did not appear in the USA until the 1880s, and has the unique feature of the trusses being suspended from a continuous horizontal top chord member, supported on roller bearings on vertical pillars at each pier.

The place is important in demonstrating the principal characteristics of a class of cultural or natural places/environments in New South Wales.

The Prince Alfred Bridge is of state heritage significance as it is representative of the engineering excellence of the designer William Christopher Bennett, and of the contractor Francis Bell. While William Christopher Bennett was responsible for the design of many hundreds of bridges in the mid to late 1800s, only very few remain. The bridge is an outstanding example of the designs of William Christopher Bennett, demonstrating his ability in sound structural analysis as well as his willingness to make use of relatively new methods and practices in bridge design.

== See also ==
- List of bridges in Australia
- Historic bridges of New South Wales

== Gallery ==
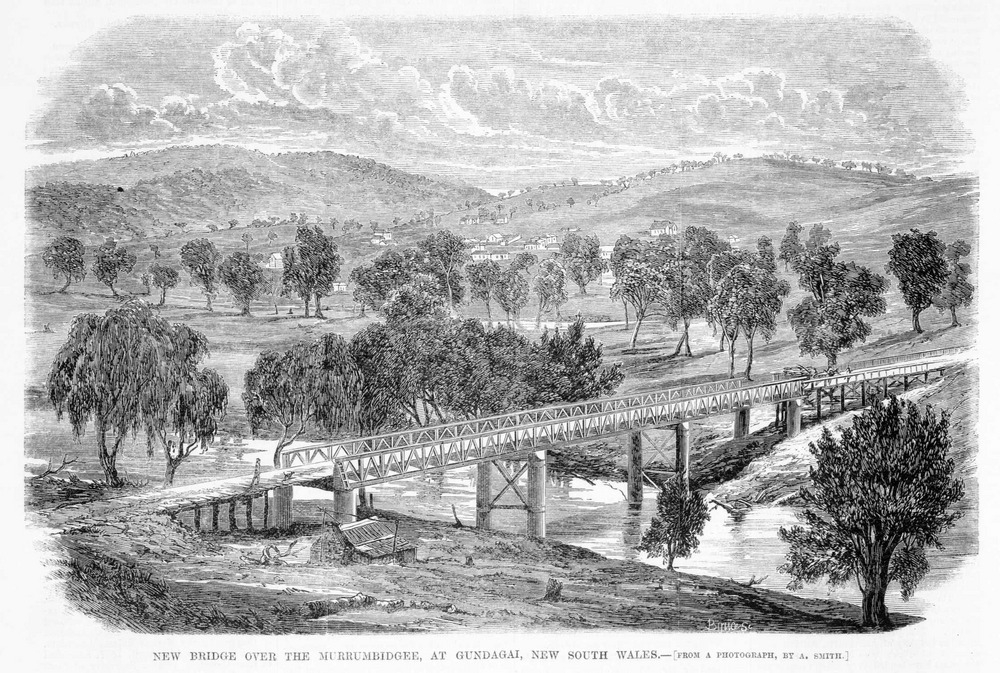
Etching of the new bridge, 1867.

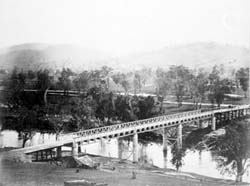
The Prince Alfred bridge crosses the Murrumbidgee River at Gundagai, photographed c. 1885.

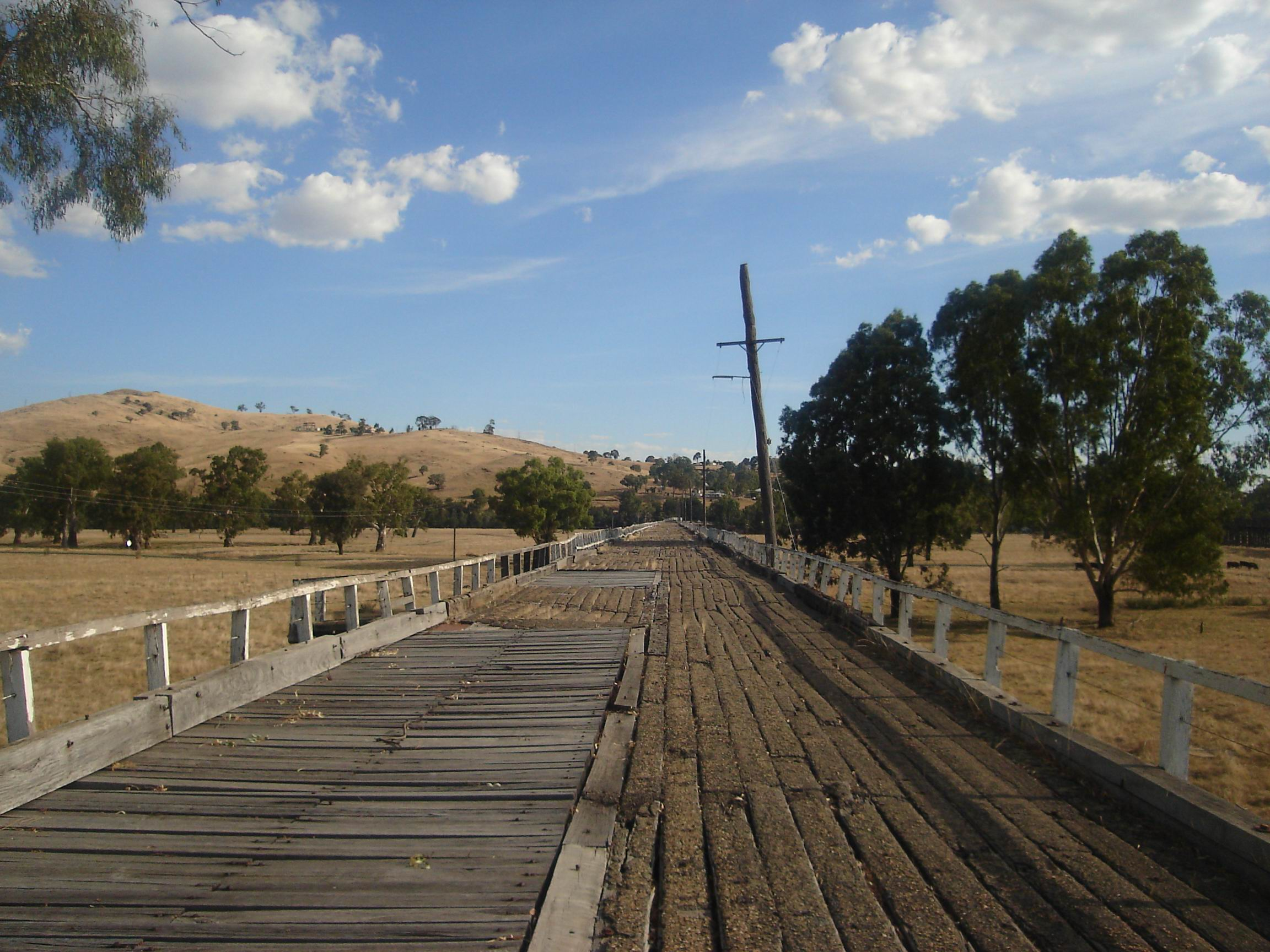
Prince Alfred Bridge, former Hume Highway.

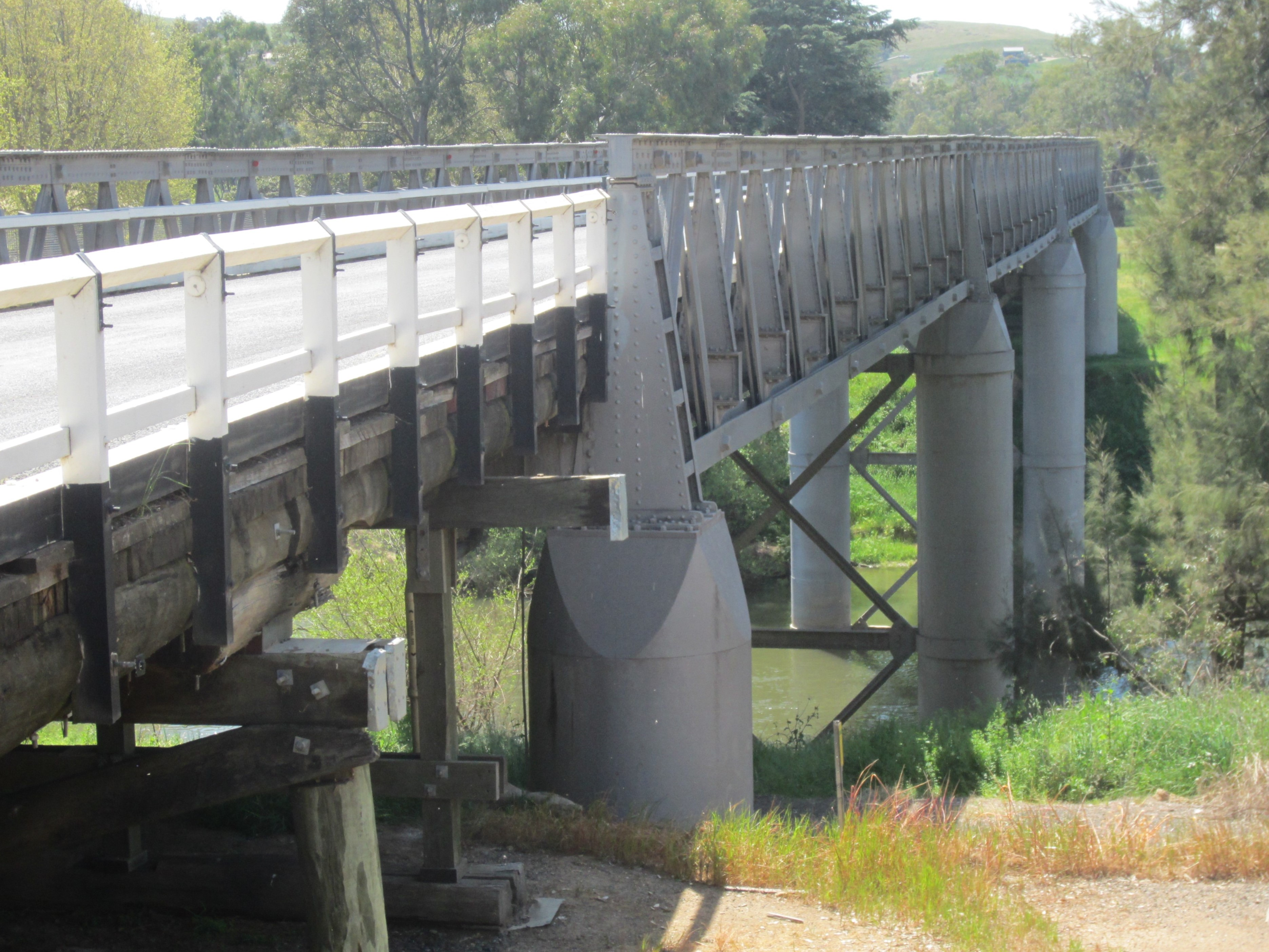
Iron spans of the Prince Alfred Bridge, viewed from the southern bank (October 2019).

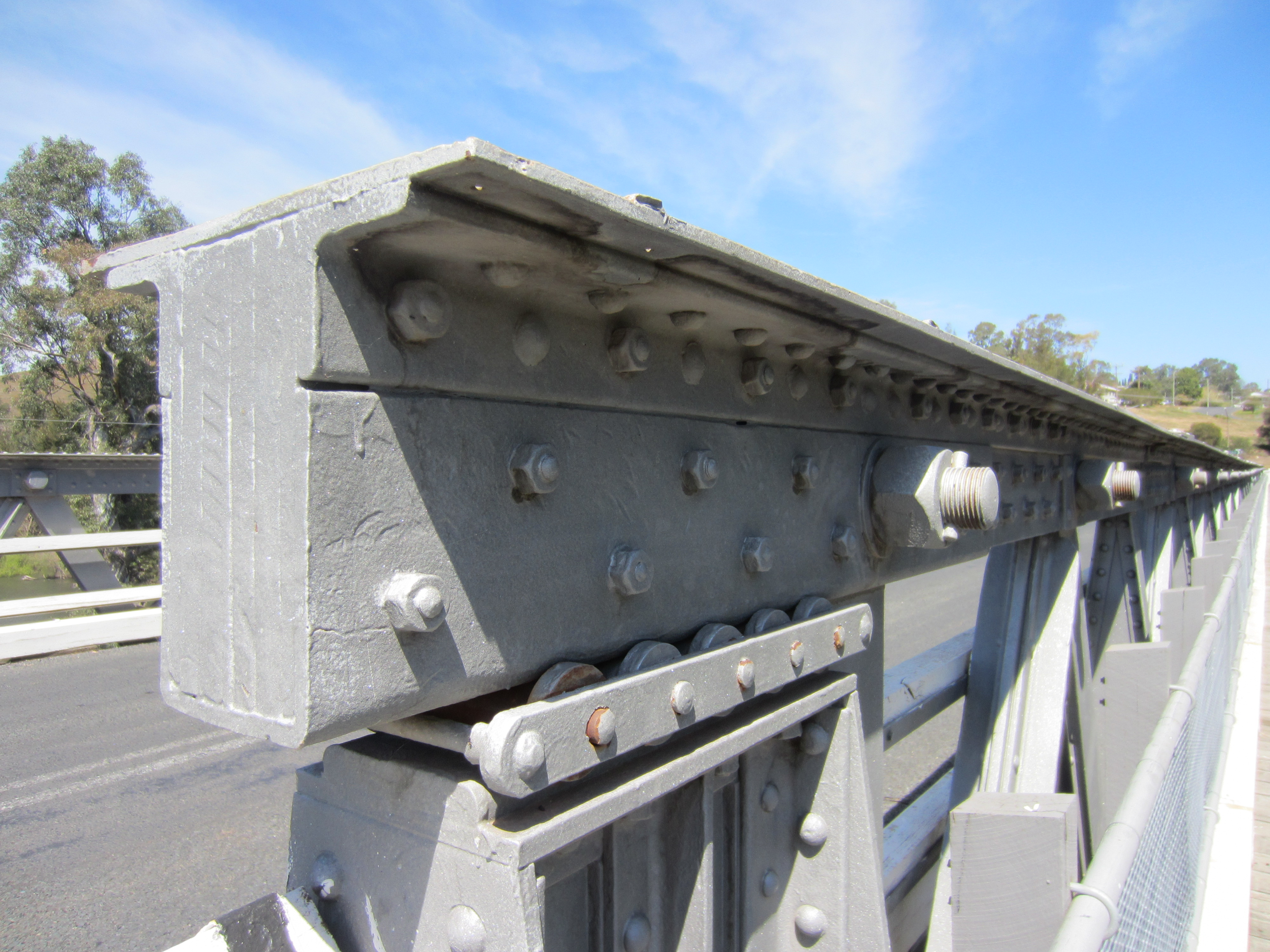
Prince Alfred Bridge, rollers carrying the top chord of the truss.
