= Denison Bridge =

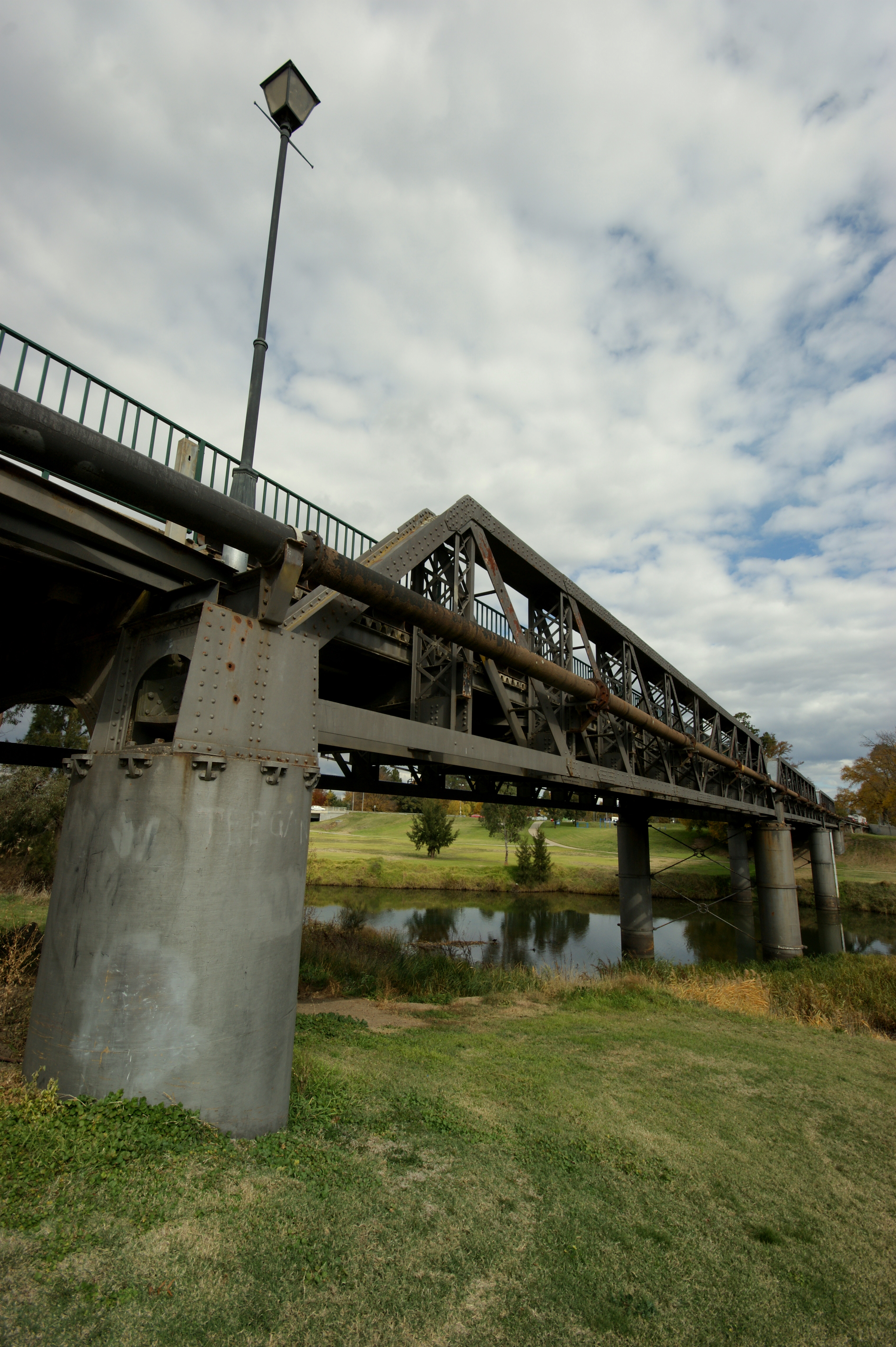
- Denison Bridge, Bathurst
- Coordinates: 33°25′02″S 149°35′31″E
- Carries: Pedestrians only (since c. 1990); Great Western Highway (1870–c. 1990)
- Crosses: Macquarie River
- Locale: Bathurst, New South Wales
- Named for: Sir William Denison
- Maintained by: Bathurst Regional Council
- Preceded by: Bridge (1856–1867)

Characteristics
- Design: Truss bridge
- Material: Steel
- Total length: 142.7 metres (468 ft)
- Width: 6.1 metres (20 ft)
- Longest span: 34.5 metres (113 ft)
- No. of spans: 9: Six at 6.7 metres (22 ft); Two at 34 metres (112 ft); One at 34.5 metres (113 ft)
- Piers in water: 2

History
- Designer: William Bennett; Gustavus Alphonse Morrell
- Constructed by: Peter Nicol Russell
- Construction start: 1869
- Construction end: 1870
- Closed: early 1990s (to road traffic)
- Replaced by: Evans Bridge

Register of the National Estate
- Official name: Denison Bridge
- Type: Historic
- Designated: 21 March 1978
- Reference no.: 15953

New South Wales Heritage Register
- Official name: Denison Bridge
- Type: Built
- Criteria: a., b., c., d., e., f., g.
- Designated: 1 August 2003
- Reference no.: 01665

Location
- Interactive map of Denison Bridge

The Denison Bridge is a heritage-listed footbridge over the Macquarie River in Bathurst, New South Wales, Australia. It is the fourth oldest metal truss bridge existing in Australia.

The bridge, completed in 1870, replaced an earlier bridge that was built in 1856 and destroyed in 1867 floods. It was designed by Gustavus Alphonse Morrell and built from 1869 to 1870 by P. N. Russell & Co. The bridge structure, except for the deck, is original and in excellent condition and for over 120 years the bridge carried the Great Western Highway over the Macquarie River.

In the early 1990s a realignment of the Great Western Highway resulted in the Evans Bridge replacing the Denison Bridge, with the latter converted to pedestrian traffic only. It was added to the New South Wales State Heritage Register on 1 August 2003, having earlier been listed on the now-defunct Register of the National Estate in 1978.

== Historical details ==
Despite the growing importance of Bathurst as the principal urban centre over the Blue Mountains, the Macquarie River, which flows past the town on the Sydney side, was not bridged until 1856.

After years of local agitation, a long timber bridge with five laminated timber arches was started in 1855 and was opened on 1 January 1856 by the Governor, Sir William Denison. A bullock was roasted on a spit and 3000 people celebrated the new bridge, named after the Governor.

This was the last "official" bridge designed by the Colonial Architect's Department under its brief direction by architect and engineer, William Weaver (1828–68). It was supervised by his Clerk of Works, William Downey, during 1855.

Eleven days later another bridge over the Macquarie River a kilometre downstream was opened by a local entrepreneur, George Ranken (frequently quoted as Rankin): this bridge was known as the Eglinton Bridge or Rankin's Bridge.

The Denison Bridge was washed away by the great flood of 1867 and its debris also destroyed Rankin's Bridge, so after eleven years of having two bridges, Bathurst again found itself with only a ford or a ferry to cross the Macquarie. A narrow temporary wooden bridge was put across near the remains of the Denison Bridge later in 1867, but this was closed for safety reasons in June 1868. The government recognised that a permanent replacement was urgently needed. A new site was chosen 100 metres downstream from the first Denison Bridge and a realignment was made to the road approaches.

The new Denison Bridge was designed by Gustavus Alphonse Morrell, Assistant Engineer to the Department of Roads and foundation member of the Engineering Association of NSW. The bridge contract drawings bear Morrell's signature and that of William Christopher Bennett, Commissioner for Roads.

The bridge was constructed in 1869 to 1870 by the prominent engineering firm, P. N. Russell & Co at a cost of 18,818 pounds through the NSW Public Works Department. Most of the angle irons and bars were specially rolled for the job at P. N. Russell & Co's Pyrmont Rolling Mills and at Bathurst's two iron foundries of that time, including the nearby Denison Foundry. Only heavy iron plates and bars were imported. The cast-iron cylinders used in the piers were cast at P. N. Russell & Co's foundry in Sydney, mainly using pig-iron from the Fitzroy Iron Works.

Like the first bridge, the new one was opened by the Governor of the time, who was now the Earl of Belmore. Denison had left the colony in 1861 for Madras and then to retirement in England, where he died in 1871. But the new bridge, opened in June 1870, was the replacement of the Denison Bridge of 1856 and the name of Denison was retained.

Although incorporated in the original design, footways were never built as part of the bridge. A steel footbridge was erected in 1950, on the upstream side, by the Department of Main Roads.

In 1964-65: six piles were driven under the timber approach spans, 23 stringers were replaced, 6 round timber girders renewed, longitudinal sheeting replaced and deck bitumen sealed, timber decking replaced by high tensile bolts in three top chord joints, expansion bearings were repaired and one girder replaced. The deck was emulsion-sprayed and grit-covered. Further repairs in 1975-76 cost $11,377. A concrete deck was laid in 1981.

In use for over 120 years as a road bridge, its service life was interrupted only for a 9-day repair period in the 1960s. It was superseded by a prestressed concrete bridge upstream and closed to vehicular traffic in the early 1990s and adapted for use as a footbridge.

Denison Bridge was an advanced design for its period and a major engineering achievement, it was the maximum span possible with a wrought iron truss span structure. It is the second oldest metal truss bridge in New South Wales after the Prince Alfred Bridge at Gundagai. The new bridge was designed on the new American Pratt truss type construction style.

== Description ==
This is an early metal truss bridge that carries 6.1 metres of roadway and a footpath. It has nine spans in all, three timber spans of 6.7m then three wrought iron trusses: 34m, 34.5m, 34m and then three again in timber at 6.7m. Total length of the bridge is 474 ft (143.5m).

The main spans consist of wrought iron pony trusses of the Pratt type. Support piers consist of timber piles under the approach spans and four pairs of cast iron cylinders 1.83m diameter braced with wrought iron crossed rods. The ten panel Pratt trusses are simply supported and have horizontally positioned I-sections for the upper chords and sloping end diagonals, but flat metal strips for the tension bottom chords and for the tension diagonals. There are metal stringers on metal cross girders, the whole being located at about the mid depth of the main trusses. The piers are twin metal cylinders.

The bridge has four lamp standards, two at each end, and in the centre two signs. On an interpretive sign about the river and people swimming there, and the original makers sign stating : "DENISON BRIDGE P. N.RUSSELL & Co. BUILDERS - SYDNEY 1870" . Beside the bridge and supported off it, are service pipes.

It was reported as being in fair to good condition and in need of regular maintenance as at 23 April 2003.

== First Denison Bridge ==
The first Denison Bridge was a three span laminated bow-string arch British type bridge commenced in January 1855 and completed the following year. It was opened on New Year's Day 1856, and named in honour of the then Governor-General Sir William Denison, who was on a tour of inspection of the Bathurst region. The first bridge lasted only 11 years, until it was destroyed by floods in 1867. The following article of the time provides great detail of the construction and the features of the first Denison Bridge:

The bridge is built of wood, strengthened in parts by iron rods; it has five arches, so to speak, built upon the suspension principle. The arches at either end are small, having a span of about fifty feet, while, the remaining space is divided between the other three arches, the centre one being apparently somewhat larger than the two others. There are two distinct lines of roadway, separated by the middle support of the bridge: one for carriages passing eastward, and another for those passing in an opposite direction. No separate provision has yet been made for foot passengers, but I believe it is contemplated to add that accommodation at a future time. The roadway is formed of wood, not otherwise covered than with a coating of preparation to resist the action of the weather, mixed with some rough material to give foothold to the horses passing over. The total length of the bridge is about, I should say, 400 feet. The whole building is well defended by strong side rails and balustrades, as well on the outer sides as on the inner line. The three are uniform. The whole of the upper part, above the roadway, is painted of a light colour, and has a very airy appearance. That below the road and under water is covered with tar, &a., and remains of its natural colour, relieving, very much, the appearance of the upper works of the bridge, and giving it a light appearance when viewed from the banks of the river. Returning to the upper works. On a buttress, at either end of the bridge, is raised a lamp, the light from which will serve to show the divisions of the track at night. The approaches to the bridge, on either side, have been well defended, and led up to, by strong fencing-not the primitive split-post and rail bush stuff, but good, legitimate, strong post and rail, well painted. A very good arrangement has been contrived to prevent collision. It consists merely in an application of those "rules of the road" which are practically on the road so little attended to.

== Heritage listing ==
The Denison Bridge, a three-span wrought iron bridge, is an early metal truss bridge built in 1870. Its advanced design was a major engineering achievement at the time and represents the maximum achievable by truss spans. The bridge is associated with three important colonial engineers: William Christopher Bennett (Commissioner and Engineer for Roads), Gustavus Alphonse Morrell (Assistant Engineer and designer) and Peter Nicol Russell (P N Russell & Co). The bridge is a prominent local landmark which has played an important role in the history of Bathurst and the Central West. It was the fifth oldest metal truss bridge in Australia until recently but is still the second oldest in NSW (after Gundagai 1867).

Denison Bridge was listed on the New South Wales State Heritage Register on 1 August 2003 having satisfied the following criteria.

The place is important in demonstrating the course, or pattern, of cultural or natural history in New South Wales.

Denison Bridge is of state significance as the fifth oldest metal truss bridge in Australia until recently and the second oldest in NSW (after Gundagai 1867). Further, the bridge is a significant technical accomplishment in the management of compressive and tension forces in metal truss members. Its design and innovative solution to the pressures of compression and tension is of historical significance in demonstrating the development of engineering and truss bridge technology.

Completed in 1870, it replaces an earlier bridge that was opened in 1856 and destroyed in 1867. The present bridge is a metal truss bridge and is currently the fourth oldest existing Australian metal trusses, following Hawthorn (1861), Gundagai Road Bridge (1867) and Redesdale (1868).

It is the oldest Pratt type truss bridge in NSW and the oldest of four colonial bridges in Bathurst. Its fabrication and erection are important as it used substantial amounts of materials and skills already available in the colony with subsequent economic benefits to the government. It is significant for being in almost continual use throughout its 120-year history as a road bridge which contributed significantly to the social stability and growth of Bathurst, making possible the continuous flow of people and goods between Sydney and the western districts of New South Wales.

The place has a strong or special association with a person, or group of persons, of importance of cultural or natural history of New South Wales's history.

The Denison Bridge is of state significance for its associations with three important colonial engineers: the government engineers W. C. Bennett and G. A Morell; and P N Russell, who formed P. N. Russell and Co and was a major benefactor of the University of Sydney.

The Denison Bridge is also significant for its association, through its name, with Sir William Denison, Governor of New South Wales 1855–1861.

The place is important in demonstrating aesthetic characteristics and/or a high degree of creative or technical achievement in New South Wales.

The Denison Bridge is of state significance for its technical sophistication and innovation. The structure incorporates an innovative and practical solution to the problem of lateral buckling of the compression top chords of each truss, which was years ahead of the theoretical solution and is of historical significance in demonstrating the development of engineering and truss bridge technology. This solution allowed the length of the bridge to approach the structural limit of truss bridge technology. The clean, open arrangement of members and joints made for easy maintenance which contributed greatly to its long service life.

“Spanning the Macquarie River and Morse and Berry Parks, the Denison Bridge is locally significant as a prominent engineering landmark and enjoys a picturesque setting.”

The place has a strong or special association with a particular community or cultural group in New South Wales for social, cultural or spiritual reasons.

The Denison Bridge has local significance as an engineering landmark. This significance is demonstrated by its inclusion in the Bathurst Heritage Study, the Register of the National Trust, an Historic Engineering Marker plaque from Engineers Australia (formerly IE Aust) in 1994 and the Register of the National Estate.

The place has potential to yield information that will contribute to an understanding of the cultural or natural history of New South Wales.

The Denison Bridge is of state significance as an engineering achievement. Through the distribution of its ironwork the fabric displays the types of forces, compression and tension generated in the members of trusses.

It is unlikely to display any archaeological significance in relation to previous occupation due to the riverine environment and unlikely to display any archaeological potential in relation to the earlier bridge.

The place possesses uncommon, rare or endangered aspects of the cultural or natural history of New South Wales.

The Denison Bridge is rare. It is of state significance as the fifth oldest early metal truss bridge in colonial Australia, and second oldest in NSW after Gundagai (built 1867).

The place is important in demonstrating the principal characteristics of a class of cultural or natural places/environments in New South Wales.

The Denison Bridge is one of a number of early metal truss bridges in colonial Australia and is representative of its type. It is, however, the second oldest in New South Wales (after Gundagai) and is technologically innovative. This bridge was the first American type Pratt truss in NSW.

== Engineering heritage ==
The bridge received a Historic Engineering Marker from Engineers Australia as part of its Engineering Heritage Recognition Program.

== Panorama ==
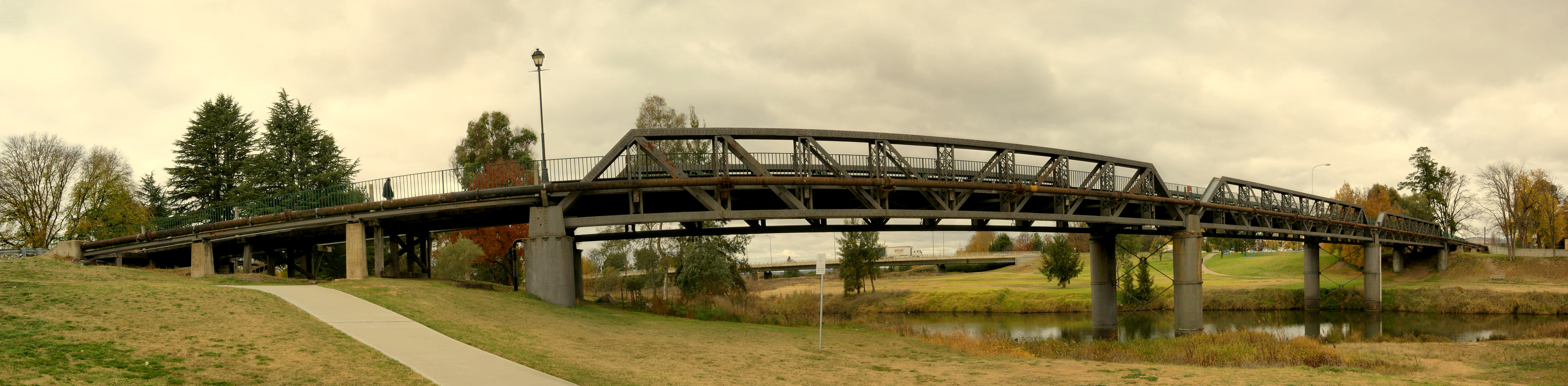
Denison Bridge, Bathurst

== See also ==
- Historic bridges of New South Wales
