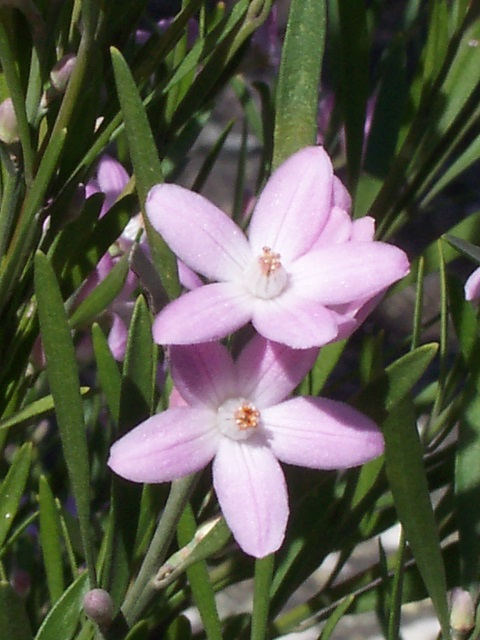
- Eriostemon australasius at Ku-ring-gai Chase National Park

Scientific classification
- Kingdom: Plantae
- Clade: Tracheophytes
- Clade: Angiosperms
- Clade: Eudicots
- Clade: Rosids
- Order: Sapindales
- Family: Rutaceae
- Subfamily: Zanthoxyloideae
- Genus: Eriostemon; Sm.

Species
- Eriostemon australasius; Eriostemon banksii

= Eriostemon =

Genus of flowering plants

Eriostemon is a genus of flowering plants of the family Rutaceae. It is native to eastern Australia and includes just two species, E. australasius and E. banksii. Eriostemon australasius, commonly known as pink wax flower, occurs between Fraser Island and Nowra and is a shrub of heathlands and low open woodlands. Eriostemon banksii is endemic to Cape York Peninsula and is a shrub or small tree occurring in heathland and rainforest margins.

== Description ==
Plants in the genus Eriostemon are shrubs or small trees which have their thinnest branches, leaves and petals covered with fine star-like hairs (although the hairs may only be visible with a magnifying glass). The leaves are arranged alternately along the branches and are simple leaves with smooth edges. The leaves are 17–80 mm (0.7–3 in) long, 5–17 mm (0.2–0.7 in) wide and have three or five main veins. The flowers are arranged singly in leaf axils, and about 12–15 mm (0.5–0.6 in) in diameter. There are five separate sepals and five petals with their edges overlapping. There are ten stamens, all with hairy filaments.

== Taxonomy and naming ==
The genus Eriostemon was first formally described in 1798 by James Edward Smith but he did not nominate a type species. The description was published in Transactions of the Linnean Society of London. Eriostemon australasius was nominated as the lectotype by Paul Wilson in 1978. The genus name (Eriostemon) is derived from the Ancient Greek words erion meaning "wool" and stemon meaning "stamen" referring to the woolly stamens.

A large number of species once classified within the genus have been placed in the newer genus Philotheca including Eriostemon verrucosus (now Philotheca verrucosa), E. myoporoides (Philotheca myoporoides) and E. buxifolius (Philotheca buxifolia). The only two species currently included are E. australasius and E. banksii.

== Use in horticulture ==
Pink wax flower is described as being a "very desirable" garden plant, however it is difficult to propagate and to maintain. A semi-shaded position in well-drained soil is regarded as the conditions best suited to the species.
