= G. floribunda =

G. floribunda may refer to:

- Galphimia floribunda, a Mexican plant
- Garuga floribunda, an incense tree
- Grevillea floribunda, a shrub endemic to Australia
