= Leioproctus imitator =

Scientific classification
- Kingdom: Animalia
- Phylum: Arthropoda
- Clade: Pancrustacea
- Class: Insecta
- Order: Hymenoptera
- Family: Colletidae
- Genus: Leioproctus
- Species: L. imitator

Binomial name
- Leioproctus imitator (Rayment, 1959)

Synonyms
- Lysicolletes imitator Rayment, 1959

Species of bee

Leioproctus imitator, or Leioproctus (Euryglossidia) imitator, is a species of bee in the family Colletidae and subfamily Colletinae. It is endemic to Australia. It was described by Australian entomologist Tarlton Rayment in 1959.

== Description ==
Male body length about 5 mm. Integumental colouration mainly black, with reddish markings on the legs, abdomen dark brown, hair white.

== Distribution and habitat ==
The species occurs in eastern Australia. The type locality is Engadine, New South Wales.

== Behaviour ==
The adults are solitary flying mellivores that nest gregariously in the ground. Flowering plants visited by the bees include Epacris microphylla, Leucopogon microphyllus, Boronia ledifolia and Eriostemon australasius.

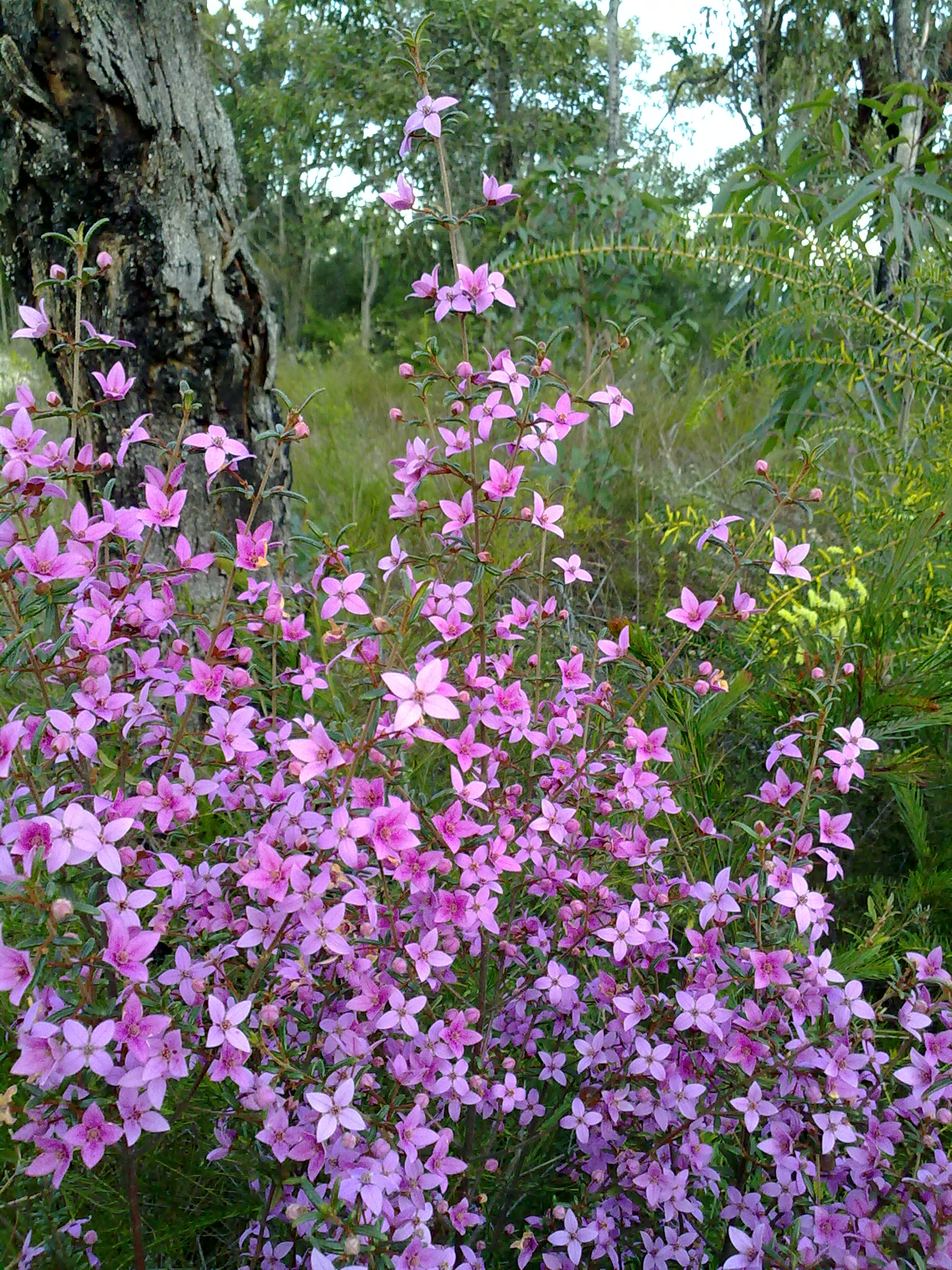
Boronia ledifolia (showy boronia), a forage plant of the bees

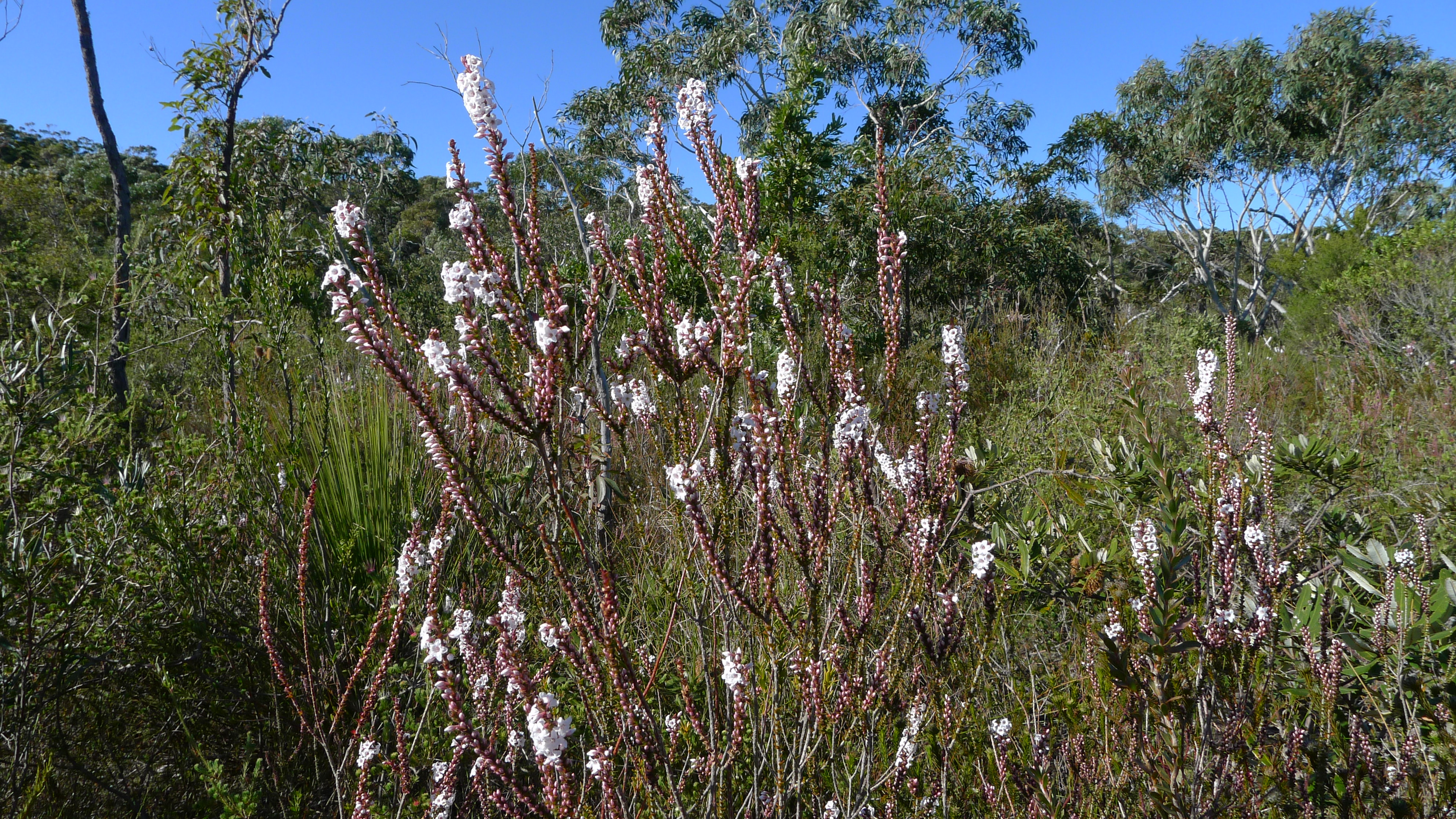
Epacris microphylla (coral heath), a forage plant of the bees
