= Grevillea lanigera 'Mt Tamboritha' =

Flowering plant cultivar

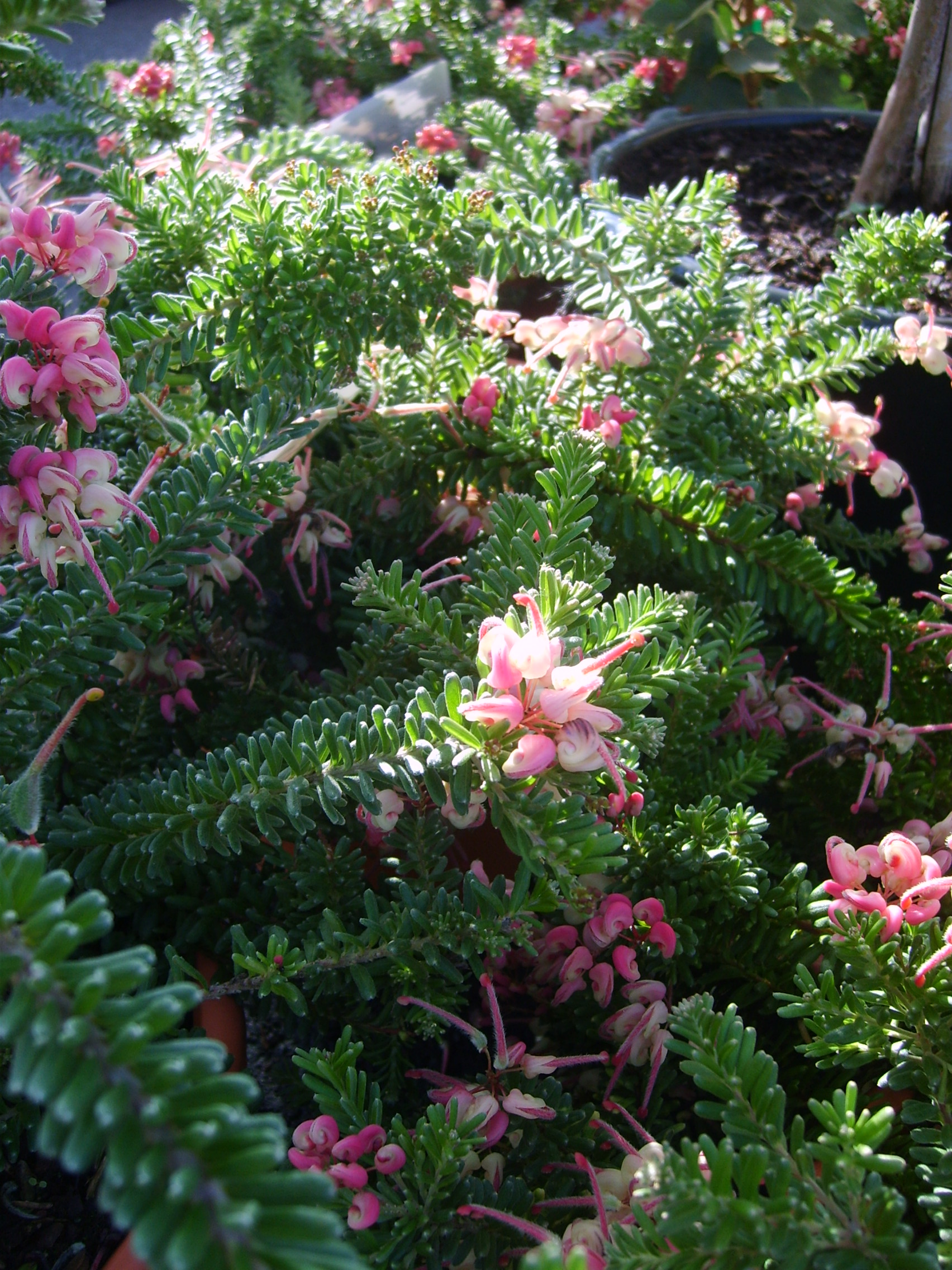
- Species: Grevillea lanigera
- Cultivar: 'Mt Tamboritha'
- Origin: Unknown

Grevillea lanigera 'Mt Tamboritha' is a cultivar of the genus Grevillea, planted widely in Australia and other countries for its ornamental foliage and flowers. It is the most popular form of Grevillea lanigera in cultivation. It is also known by the names 'Mt Tamboritha form', 'Compacta', 'Prostrate', 'Prostrate Form' or the misnomer 'Mt Tambourine'.

== Description ==
The cultivar is a spreading, low shrub that grows to 0.4 metres in height and 1 to 2 metres wide. The overall appearance of the foliage is dense and dark green with a silvery sheen from the fine hairs. The leaves, which are narrow and oblong, are notably smaller than most forms of the species. These are arranged spirally on the arching, wiry stems. Flowers are pinkish-red and cream and appear in clusters. The primary flowering period is from late winter to spring, though flowers may be seen throughout the year.

== Origin ==
The cultivar was introduced by plantsman Bill Cane. Despite being widely known as the "Mount Tamboritha form" of Grevillea lanigera it is believed that it did not originate from Mount Tamboritha, a mountain in the Alpine National Park, east of Licola in Victoria. A form of Grevillea lanigera occurs at that location, but it is different in appearance. It is thought that the cultivar is a coastal form that may have been selected from the Yanakie Isthmus - Wilsons Promontory region in Victoria. 'Mt Tamboritha' has not been registered with the Australian Cultivar Registration Authority.

== Cultivation ==
The cultivar has been planted widely in Australia and other countries due its ornamental foliage, compact form, showy flower clusters and attraction to nectar-seeking birds. Plants are suited to being grown in rockeries or containers.

'Mt Tamboritha' prefers a well-drained situation with full sun exposure, or in partial shade. The preferred soil type is sandy to medium loam that is slightly acidic and well-drained. It can grow in a wide variety of climates, being able to withstand temperatures as low as −5 °C (23 °F), while tolerant of humid subtropical climates such as in Brisbane. Once established, it will tolerate extended dry periods. In wet or humid situations, the foliage underneath may turn brown, a situation that may be overcome by using a stone or pebble mulch underneath.

In 2003, it was reported that the fungal disease Phytophthora palmivora had been detected in plant nurseries in Sicily, leading to root rot and death of potted Grevillea cultivars. However, plants of 'Mt Tamboritha' appeared resistant.

Propagation from cuttings is required to ensure new plants are true to type.

== See also ==
- List of Grevillea cultivars
