= Bill Cane =

Australian plantsman

William Lancashire Cane (1911–1987) was an Australian plantsman who introduced many new native plant species, forms and hybrids into cultivation.

Cane was born in Carlton, Victoria in 1911. His father was killed in World War I and his mother died in 1919, leaving Cane and his three brothers to become wards of the state. They were sent to live with relatives near Sale in Gippsland, and Cane was enrolled at the school in Wurruk. At the age of 13 he attained his merit certificate and left school, later becoming an apiarist.

Cane established Clearview Nursery in 1947 on Brewer's Hill near Maffra. There he experimented with propagation techniques, finding success in areas deemed near impossible by others including successfully growing semi-parasitic Exocarpos species and propagating Eucalyptus species, Persoonia chamaepeuce and Calectasia intermedia (Blue Tinsel Lily) from cuttings. Cane was a long time correspondent with George Althofer of Burrendong Arboretum in New South Wales. The arboretum suffered disastrous floods in 1947, and Cane propagated hundreds of plants which he sent there to aid with reestablishment.

During his time at the nursery he made numerous field trips, particularly to the remote high country of East Gippsland, and would consult with botanist Jean Galbraith regarding plant identification. He was the first to note that a form of Banksia found at higher altitudes may be a new species which was subsequently named in his honour - Banksia canei, based on plant material that he had collected. He was involved in the establishment of the Society for Growing Australian Plants and was made an honorary life member in 1986.

Plants that he developed or introduced to cultivation included:

- Callistemon 'Father Christmas'
- Correa 'Clearview Giant'
- Crowea 'Cane's Hybrid'
- Leptospermum 'Clearview Fairy'
- Grevillea 'Clearview David'
- Grevillea 'Clearview John'
- Grevillea 'Clearview Robin'
- Grevillea lanigera (prostrate form)
- Philotheca verrucosa 'Heyfield Double Wax'
- Prostanthera cuneata 'Alpine Gold'
