= Leioproctus amblycladus =

Scientific classification
- Kingdom: Animalia
- Phylum: Arthropoda
- Clade: Pancrustacea
- Class: Insecta
- Order: Hymenoptera
- Family: Colletidae
- Genus: Leioproctus
- Species: L. amblycladus

Binomial name
- Leioproctus amblycladus Batley, 2025

Species of bee

Leioproctus amblycladus, or Leioproctus (Euryglossidia) amblycladus, is a species of bee in the family Colletidae and subfamily Colletinae. It is endemic to Australia. It was described by entomologist Michael Batley in 2025.

== Etymology ==
The specific epithet amblycladus (Greek: "blunt" + "branch") is an anatomical reference to the inner tooth of the female claw.

== Description ==
Female body length is 7.0 mm. Integumental colouration is mainly black with brown markings. The hair is white and brown.

== Distribution and habitat ==
The species occurs in eastern Australia. The type locality is Cocoparra National Park in the Riverina region of New South Wales.

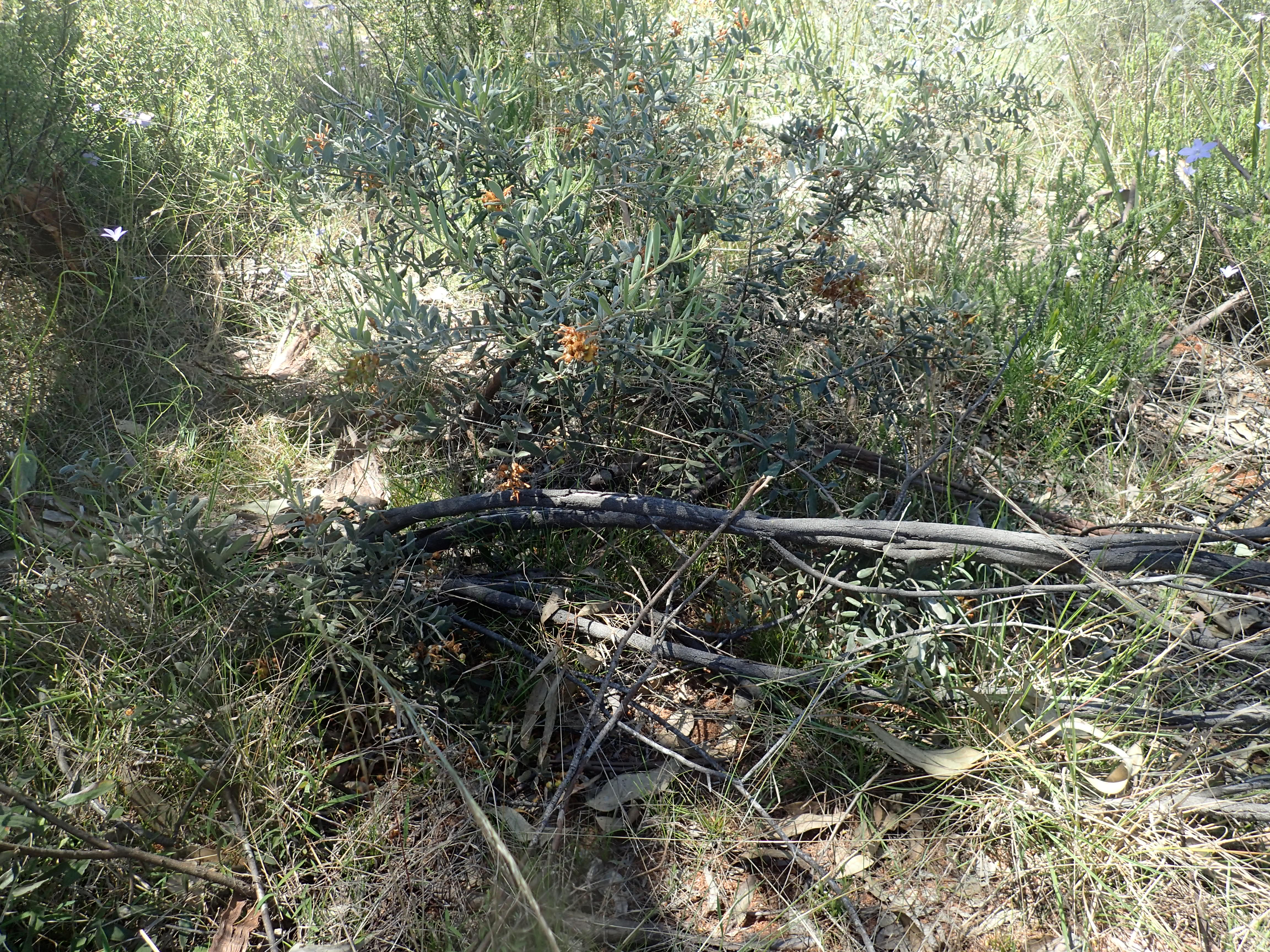
Grevillea floribunda (seven dwarfs grevillea), a forage plant of the bees

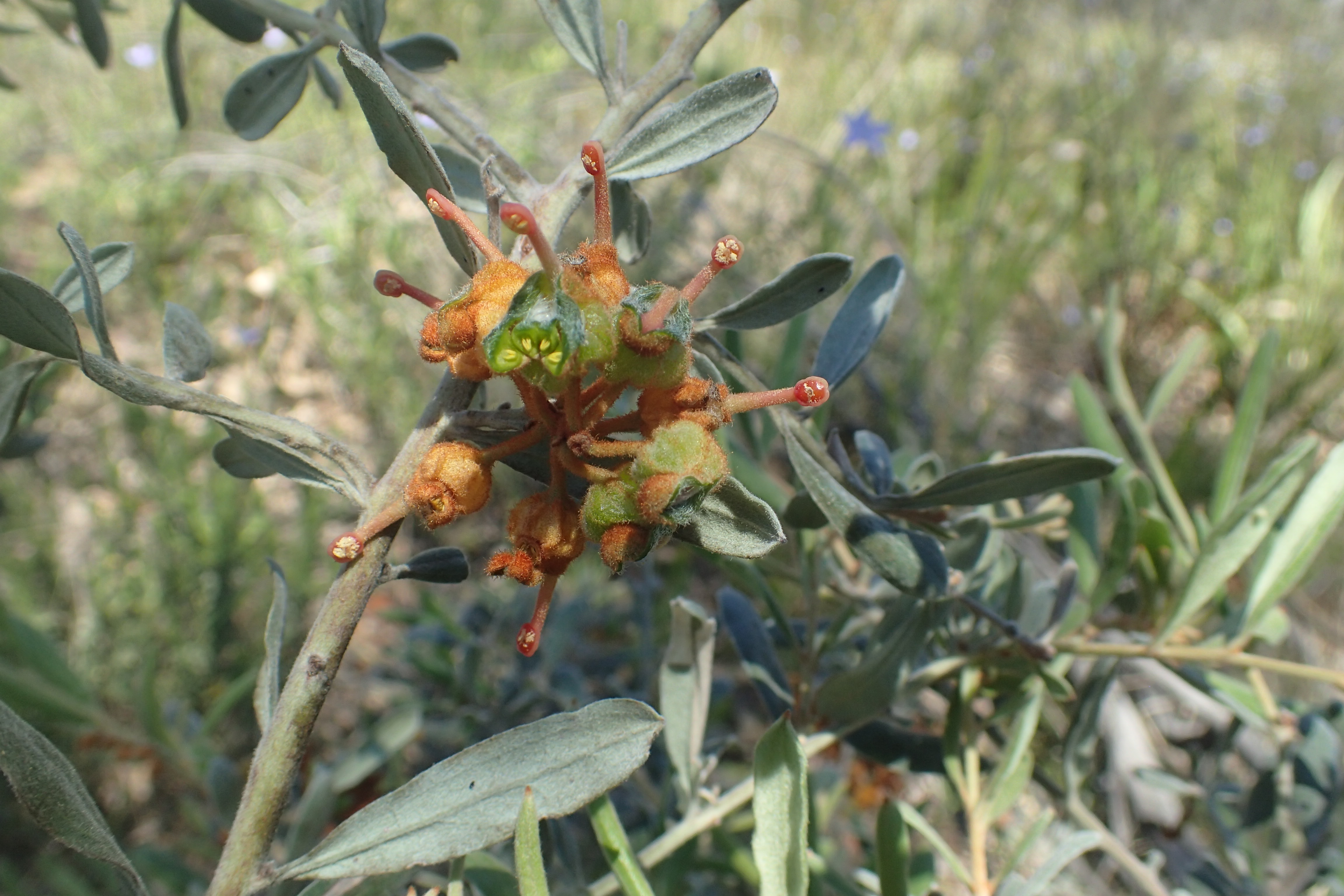
Flowers of Grevillea floribunda

== Behaviour ==
The adults are flying mellivores. Flowering plants visited by the bees include Grevillea floribunda.
