= Philotheca myoporoides subsp. petraea =

Scientific classification
- Kingdom: Plantae
- Clade: Tracheophytes
- Clade: Angiosperms
- Clade: Eudicots
- Clade: Rosids
- Order: Sapindales
- Family: Rutaceae
- Genus: Philotheca
- Species: P. myoporoides
- Subspecies: P. m. subsp. petraea

Trinomial name
- Philotheca myoporoides subsp. petraea Rozefelds

Synonyms
- Philotheca myoporoides subsp. petraeus Rozefelds orth. var.; Eriostemon myoporoides subsp. myoporoides auct. non DC.: Bayly, M.J.; Philotheca myoporoides auct. non (DC.) Bayly

Subspecies of flowering plant

Philotheca myoporoides subsp. petraea is a subspecies of flowering plant in the family Rutaceae and is endemic to a small area in Victoria, Australia. It is an erect shrub with leathery, egg-shaped leaves with the narrower end towards the base, and white flowers arranged singly or in groups of up to four in leaf axils.

== Description ==
Philotheca myoporoides subsp. petraea is an erect shrub that typically grows to a height of 1 m (3 ft 3 in) with glabrous, green, prominently glandular-warty stems. The leaves are leathery, egg-shaped with the narrower end towards the base, 8–16 mm (0.31–0.63 in) long, 4–7 mm (0.16–0.28 in) wide and V-shaped in cross-section. The flowers are arranged singly or in groups of up to four in leaf axils on a peduncle 2–3 mm (0.079–0.118 in) long, each flower on a pedicel 2.5–3 mm (0.098–0.118 in) long with conspicuous bracteoles at the base. The sepals are semicircular, about 1 mm (0.039 in) long and 1.5 mm (0.059 in) wide, the petals elliptical, white, about 6 mm (0.24 in) long and 2.3–3 mm (0.091–0.118 in) wide. The stamens are free from each other and hairy. Flowering has been observed in November.

== Taxonomy and naming ==
This subspecies was first formally described in 2001 by Andrew Carl Frank Rozefelds in the journal Muelleria from specimens collected on Mount Stewart in East Gippsland in 1995.

== Distribution and habitat ==
This subspecies is only known from the summit of Mount Stewart near Gelantipy where it grows in rocky shrubland at an altitude of about 800 m (2,600 ft).
