= Philotheca myoporoides subsp. euroensis =

Scientific classification
- Kingdom: Plantae
- Clade: Embryophytes
- Clade: Tracheophytes
- Clade: Spermatophytes
- Clade: Angiosperms
- Clade: Eudicots
- Clade: Rosids
- Order: Sapindales
- Family: Rutaceae
- Genus: Philotheca
- Species: P. myoporoides
- Subspecies: P. m. subsp. euroensis

Trinomial name
- Philotheca myoporoides subsp. euroensis Bayly

Subspecies of flowering plant

Philotheca myoporoides subsp. euroensis is a subspecies of flowering plant in the family Rutaceae and is endemic to a small area in Victoria, Australia. It is a small shrub with curved, broadly elliptic leaves and white or pink flowers arranged singly or in groups of up to four in leaf axils.

== Description ==
Philotheca myoporoides subsp. euroensis is an open shrub that typically grows to a height of 1 m (3 ft 3 in) with glabrous, densely glandular-warty stems, sometimes tinged with maroon. The leaves are leathery, broadly elliptic, 15–35 mm (0.59–1.38 in) long and 6–12 mm (0.24–0.47 in) wide and folded lengthwise. The flowers are arranged singly or in groups of up to four in leaf axils on a thick peduncle up to 7 mm (0.28 in) long, each flower on a thin pedicel 3–6 mm (0.12–0.24 in) long with three or four bracteoles at the base. The sepals are broadly egg-shaped to more or less round and about 1 mm (0.039 in) long and the petals are elliptic, white to pink and 5–7.5 mm (0.20–0.30 in) long. The stamens are free from each other and hairy. Flowering occurs from May to November and the fruit is prominently beaked.

== Taxonomy and naming ==
This subspecies was first formally described in 1998 by Michael Bayly in the journal Muelleria.

== Distribution and habitat ==
This subspecies is only known from a few small populations growing near granite boulders in the Strathbogie Ranges near Euroa in central-eastern Victoria.
