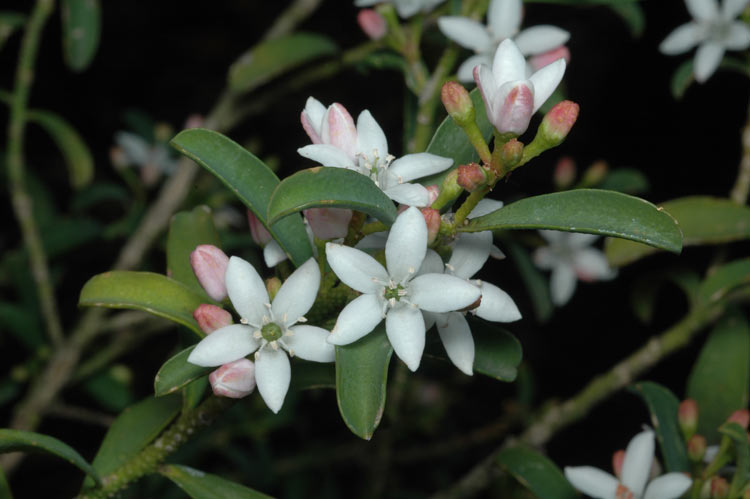
- In the Australian National Botanic Gardens

Scientific classification
- Kingdom: Plantae
- Clade: Embryophytes
- Clade: Tracheophytes
- Clade: Spermatophytes
- Clade: Angiosperms
- Clade: Eudicots
- Clade: Rosids
- Order: Sapindales
- Family: Rutaceae
- Genus: Philotheca
- Species: P. myoporoides
- Subspecies: P. m. subsp. acuta

Trinomial name
- Philotheca myoporoides subsp. acuta (DC.) Bayly

Synonyms
- Eriostemon affinis Sprague; Eriostemon myoporoides subsp. acutus (Blakely) Paul G.Wilson; Eriostemon myoporoides var. acutus Blakely

= Philotheca myoporoides subsp. acuta =

Subspecies of flowering plant

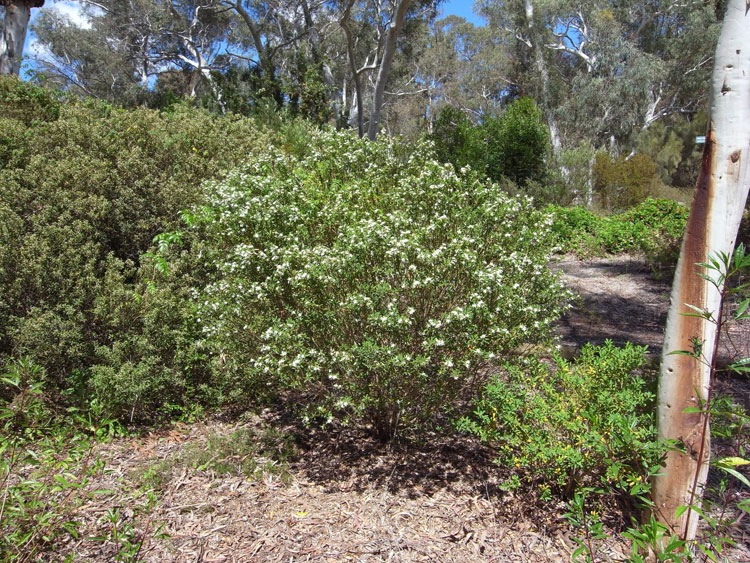
Habit in the ANBG

Philotheca myoporoides subsp. acuta is a subspecies of flowering plant in the family Rutaceae and is endemic to New South Wales. It is a shrub with narrow oblong or narrow elliptic leaves and white flowers arranged singly or in groups of up to three in leaf axils.

== Description ==
Philotheca myoporoides subsp. acuta is a shrub that typically grows to a height of 1.8–2 m (5 ft 11 in – 6 ft 7 in) with glabrous, densely glandular-warty stems. The leaves are sessile, oblong-elliptic to elliptic or rarely lance-shaped with the narrower end towards the base, 25–40 mm (0.98–1.57 in) long and 4–8 mm (0.16–0.31 in) wide and there is a small point on the tip. The flowers are arranged singly or in twos or threes in leaf axils on a peduncle up to 5 mm (0.20 in) long, each flower on a pedicel 1–10 mm (0.039–0.394 in) long. The petals are broadly elliptic, about 8 mm (0.31 in) long with a prominent keel. Flowering mainly occurs in spring and autumn.

== Taxonomy and naming ==
This taxon was first formally described in 1941 by William Blakely who gave it the Eriostemon myoporoides var. acutus and published the description in Contributions from the New South Wales Herbarium. In 1998, Michael James Bayly changed the name to Philotheca myoporoides subsp. acuta in the journal Muelleria.

== Distribution and habitat ==
This subspecies grows on rocky sandstone hills, mainly from Lockhart to south of Cobar in southern central New South Wales.
