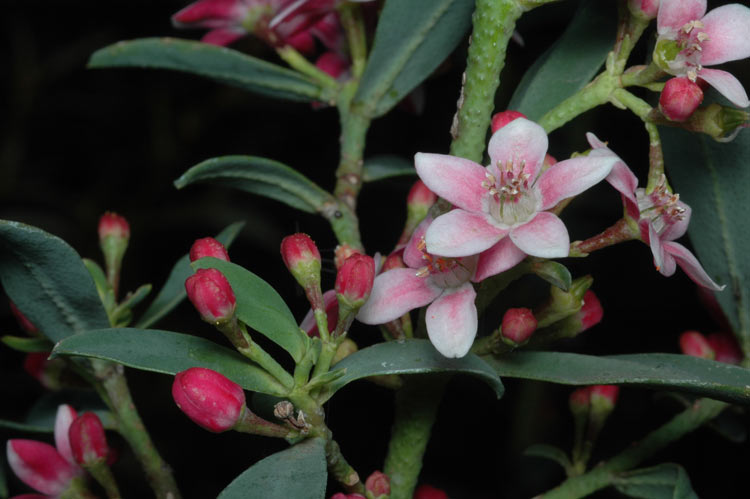
- In the Australian National Botanic Gardens

Scientific classification
- Kingdom: Plantae
- Clade: Embryophytes
- Clade: Tracheophytes
- Clade: Spermatophytes
- Clade: Angiosperms
- Clade: Eudicots
- Clade: Rosids
- Order: Sapindales
- Family: Rutaceae
- Genus: Philotheca
- Species: P. myoporoides
- Subspecies: P. m. subsp. myoporoides

Trinomial name
- Philotheca myoporoides subsp. myoporoides (DC.) Bayly

Synonyms
- List: Eriostemon amplifolius F.Muell.; Eriostemon cuspidatum A.Cunn. orth. var.; Eriostemon cuspidatus A.Cunn.; Eriostemon lancifolius F.Muell.; Eriostemon myoporoides DC. subsp. myoporoides; Eriostemon myoporoides DC. var. myoporoides; Eriostemon neriifolius Sieber ex Spreng.; Phebalium amplifolium (F.Muell.) Maiden & Betche

= Philotheca myoporoides subsp. myoporoides =

Long-leaf wax-flower

Subspecies of flowering plant

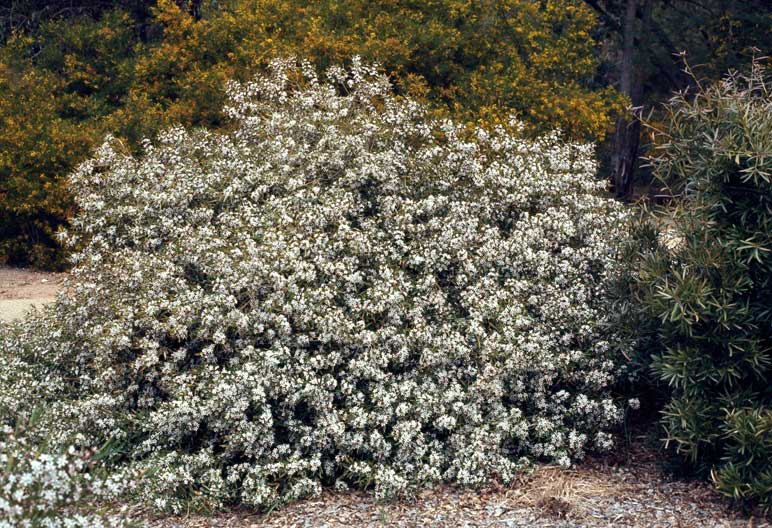
Habit

Philotheca myoporoides subsp. myoporoides, commonly known as long-leaf wax flower, is a subspecies of flowering plant in the family Rutaceae and is endemic to south-eastern continental Australia. It is a shrub with oblong to elliptic or egg-shaped leaves and white or pink flowers arranged in groups of three to eight in leaf axils.

== Description ==
Philotheca myoporoides subsp. myoporoides is a shrub, sometimes a small tree, that typically grows to a height of 2.5 m (8 ft 2 in) with glabrous, slightly to moderately glandular-warty stems. The leaves are variable in shape, oblong to elliptic or broadly elliptic to egg-shaped with the narrower end towards the base, 20–110 mm (0.79–4.33 in) long, 6–22 mm (0.24–0.87 in) wide and glandular-warty with a prominent midrib. The flowers are mostly arranged in groups of three to eight in leaf axils on a peduncle 0.5–20 mm (0.020–0.787 in) long, each flower on a pedicel 4–10 mm (0.16–0.39 in) long. The petals are broadly elliptic, white to pink and about 8 mm (0.31 in) long and the stamens are free from each other and hairy. Flowering occurs from July to January and the fruit is about 7 mm (0.28 in) long with a beak about 3 mm (0.12 in) long.

== Taxonomy and naming ==
In 1824, de Candolle described Eriostemon myoporoides in his book Prodromus Systematis Naturalis Regni Vegetabilis, and in 1988 Michael Bayly changed the name to Philotheca myoporoides in the journal Muelleria. In the same paper, Bayley described nine subspecies, including subspecies myoporoides.

== Distribution and habitat ==
Subspecies myoporoides is the most widespread and most variable of the species and occurs along the Great Dividing Range, mainly from Denman in New South Wales to near Healesville in Victoria. It grows in forest and heath, often near watercourses or on rocky hillsides.
