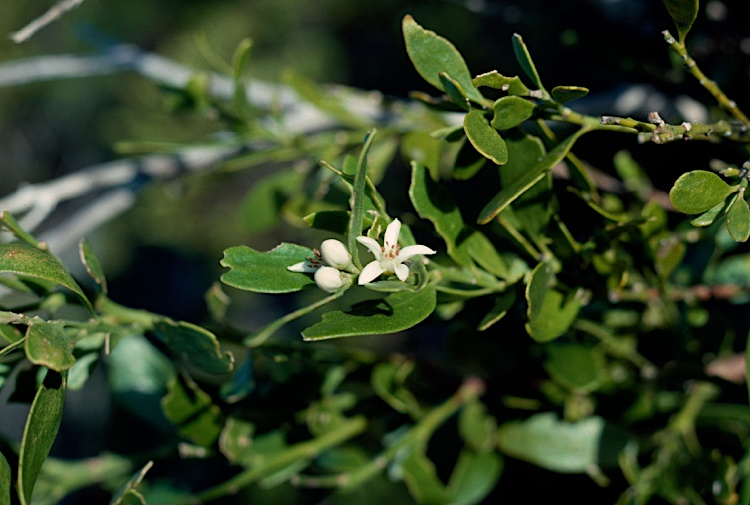

Scientific classification
- Kingdom: Plantae
- Clade: Tracheophytes
- Clade: Angiosperms
- Clade: Eudicots
- Clade: Rosids
- Order: Sapindales
- Family: Rutaceae
- Genus: Eriostemon
- Species: E. banksii

Binomial name
- Eriostemon banksii A.Cunn. ex Endl.

Synonyms
- Eriostemon australasius subsp. banksii (A.Cunn. ex Endl.) Paul G.Wilson; Eriostemum banksii A.Cunn. ex Endl. orth. var.

= Eriostemon banksii =

Species of flowering plant

Eriostemon banksii is a species of flowering plant in the citrus family Rutaceae and is endemic to eastern Australia. It is a shrub or small tree with egg-shaped to elliptic leaves and scattered white flowers with five petals and ten stamens.

== Description ==
Eriostemon banksii is a shrub or small tree that typically grows to a height of up to 6 m (20 ft) and has hairy branchlets. The leaves are egg-shaped to elliptic or broadly elliptic, 30–60 mm (1.2–2.4 in) long, 7–12 mm (0.28–0.47 in) wide, and thin. The flowers are few in number, borne on a pedicel 4–8 mm (0.16–0.31 in) long with broadly egg-shaped, warty sepals 1.0–1.5 mm (0.039–0.059 in) long with silvery scaly hairs. The petals are white, elliptic, about 7 mm (0.28 in) long and covered with silvery, star-shaped hairs. Flowering mainly occurs from April to September.

== Taxonomy and naming ==
Eriostemon banksii was first formally described in 1837 by Stephan Endlicher in Enumeratio plantarum quas in Novae Hollandiae ora austro-occidentali ad fluvium Cygnorum et in sinu Regis Georgii collegit Carolus Liber Baro de Hügel after an unpublished description by Allan Cunningham of specimens he collected on the sandy shore of the Endeavour River in 1819.

== Distribution and habitat ==
This eriostemon grows in forest on old sand dunes in near-coastal areas of Cape York Peninsula in far north Queensland.
