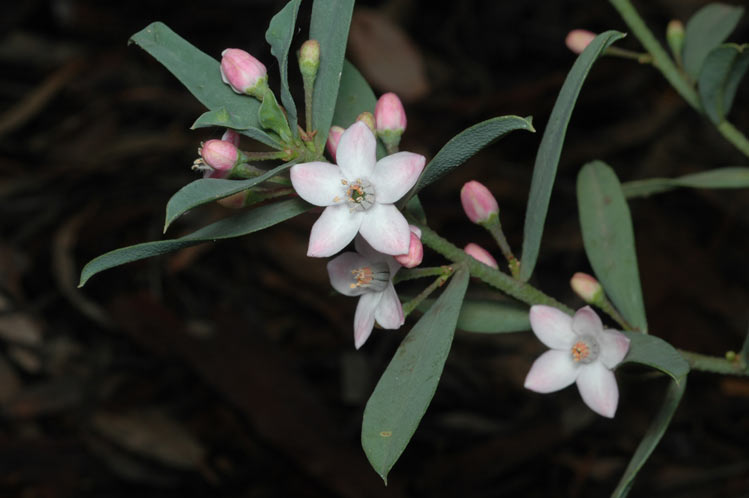
- In the Australian National Botanic Gardens

Scientific classification
- Kingdom: Plantae
- Clade: Tracheophytes
- Clade: Angiosperms
- Clade: Eudicots
- Clade: Rosids
- Order: Sapindales
- Family: Rutaceae
- Genus: Philotheca
- Species: P. myoporoides
- Subspecies: P. m. subsp. brevipedunculata

Trinomial name
- Philotheca myoporoides subsp. brevipedunculata Bayly

= Philotheca myoporoides subsp. brevipedunculata =

Subspecies of flowering plant

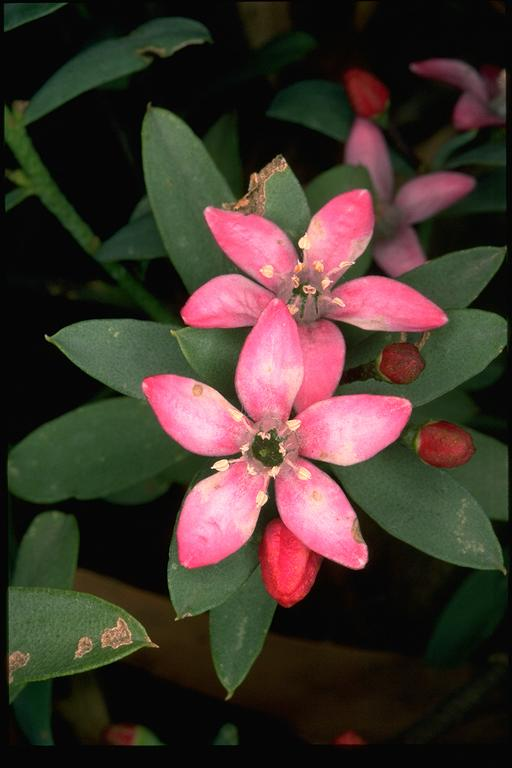
Pink form in the ANBG

Philotheca myoporoides subsp. brevipedunculata is a subspecies of flowering plant in the family Rutaceae and is endemic to New South Wales. It is a shrub with oblong or egg-shaped leaves and white or pink flowers arranged singly or in groups of up to three in leaf axils.

== Description ==
Philotheca myoporoides subsp. brevipedunculata is a shrub that typically grows to a height of 1.8–2 m (5 ft 11 in – 6 ft 7 in) with glabrous, densely glandular-warty stems. The leaves are leathery, oblong-elliptic to egg-shaped with the narrower end towards the base, 10–30 mm (0.39–1.18 in) long and 5–10 mm (0.20–0.39 in) wide and there is a small point on the tip. The flowers are usually arranged singly, sometimes in twos or threes, rarely four, in leaf axils on a peduncle up to 2 mm (0.079 in) long, each flower on a thin pedicel 4–8 mm (0.16–0.31 in) long. The petals are broadly elliptic, about 8 mm (0.31 in) long with a prominent keel. The stamens are free from each other and hairy near the base. Flowering mainly occurs in spring and autumn.

== Taxonomy and naming ==
This subspecies was first formally described in 1998 by Michael Bayly in the journal Muelleria.

== Distribution and habitat ==
This subspecies grows from coastal to escarpment ranges from Sassafras to the Moruya district in south-eastern New South Wales.
