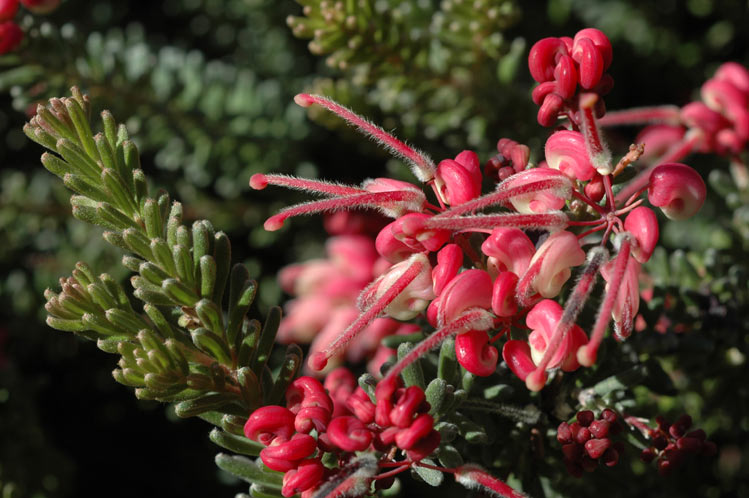
- Grevillea lanigera in the ANBG

Conservation status
- Least Concern (IUCN 3.1)

Scientific classification
- Kingdom: Plantae
- Clade: Embryophytes
- Clade: Tracheophytes
- Clade: Spermatophytes
- Clade: Angiosperms
- Clade: Eudicots
- Order: Proteales
- Family: Proteaceae
- Genus: Grevillea
- Species: G. lanigera

Binomial name
- Grevillea lanigera A.Cunn. ex R.Br.

Synonyms
- List: Grevillea baueri var. pubescens Benth. nom. illeg.; Grevillea ericifolia R.Br.; Grevillea ericifolia R.Br. var. ericifolia; Grevillea ericifolia var. muelleri Meisn.; Grevillea ericifolia var. scabrella (Meisn.) Benth.; Grevillea lanigera A.Cunn. ex R.Br. var. lanigera; Grevillea lanigera var. planifolia Meisn.; Grevillea lanigera var. revoluta Meisn.; Grevillea scabrella Meisn. nom. inval., nom. nud.; Grevillea scabrella Meisn.

= Grevillea lanigera =

Woolly grevillea

Species of shrub endemic to Australia

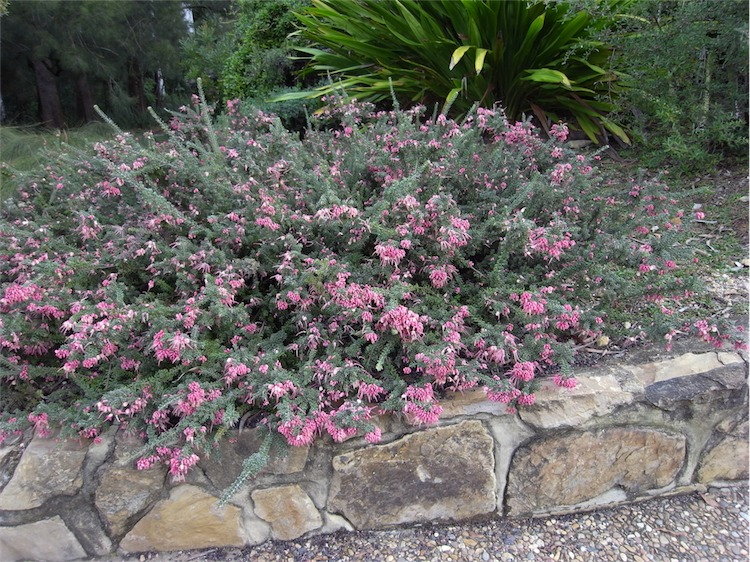
Habit in the Australian National Botanic Gardens

Grevillea lanigera, commonly known as woolly grevillea, is a species of flowering plant in the family Proteaceae and is endemic to south-eastern continental Australia. It is a spreading shrub with narrowly oblong to more or less linear leaves and clusters of pink to red, and cream-coloured flowers.

== Description ==
Grevillea lanigera is usually a spreading shrub that typically grows to a height of 20–50 cm (7.9–19.7 in), sometimes a dense rounded shrub to 2 m (6 ft 7 in) high. Its leaves are narrowly oblong to more or less linear, 5–40 mm (0.20–1.57 in) long and 0.7–5 mm (0.028–0.197 in) wide, with the edges turned down or rolled under. The lower surface of the leaves is shaggy-hairy. The flowers are arranged in clusters of two to ten on a rachis 2.5–10 mm (0.098–0.394 in) long and are pale pink to red and cream-coloured. The style is shaggy- or woolly-hairy except near its tip, the pistil 13.5–19.5 mm (0.53–0.77 in) long and hairy inside. Flowering mainly occurs from July to December, but flowers are sometimes present in other months. The fruit is a shaggy-hairy, elliptic to oblong follicle 10–15 mm (0.39–0.59 in) long.

== Taxonomy ==
Grevillea lanigera was first formally described in 1830 by Robert Brown in his Supplementum primum Prodromi florae Novae Hollandiae from specimens collected near the Lachlan River by Allan Cunningham. The specific epithet (lanigera) means "wool-bearing".

== Distribution and habitat ==
Woolly grevillea grows in moist, rocky places in scrub, woodland and forest, south from near Dubbo and east of the Riverina in New South Wales, mainly on the coast and tablelands through the Australian Capital Territory to eastern Victoria.

The species is variable in habit, features of the leaves and abundance of flowers, and forms hybrids with G. rosmarinifolia, G. polybractea and G. floribunda.

== Use in horticulture ==
This grevillea is popular in cultivation and can be grown from seed or from cuttings. It is hardy in a range of climate and soil conditions. It is drought and frost hardy but prefers a sunny position in the garden.
