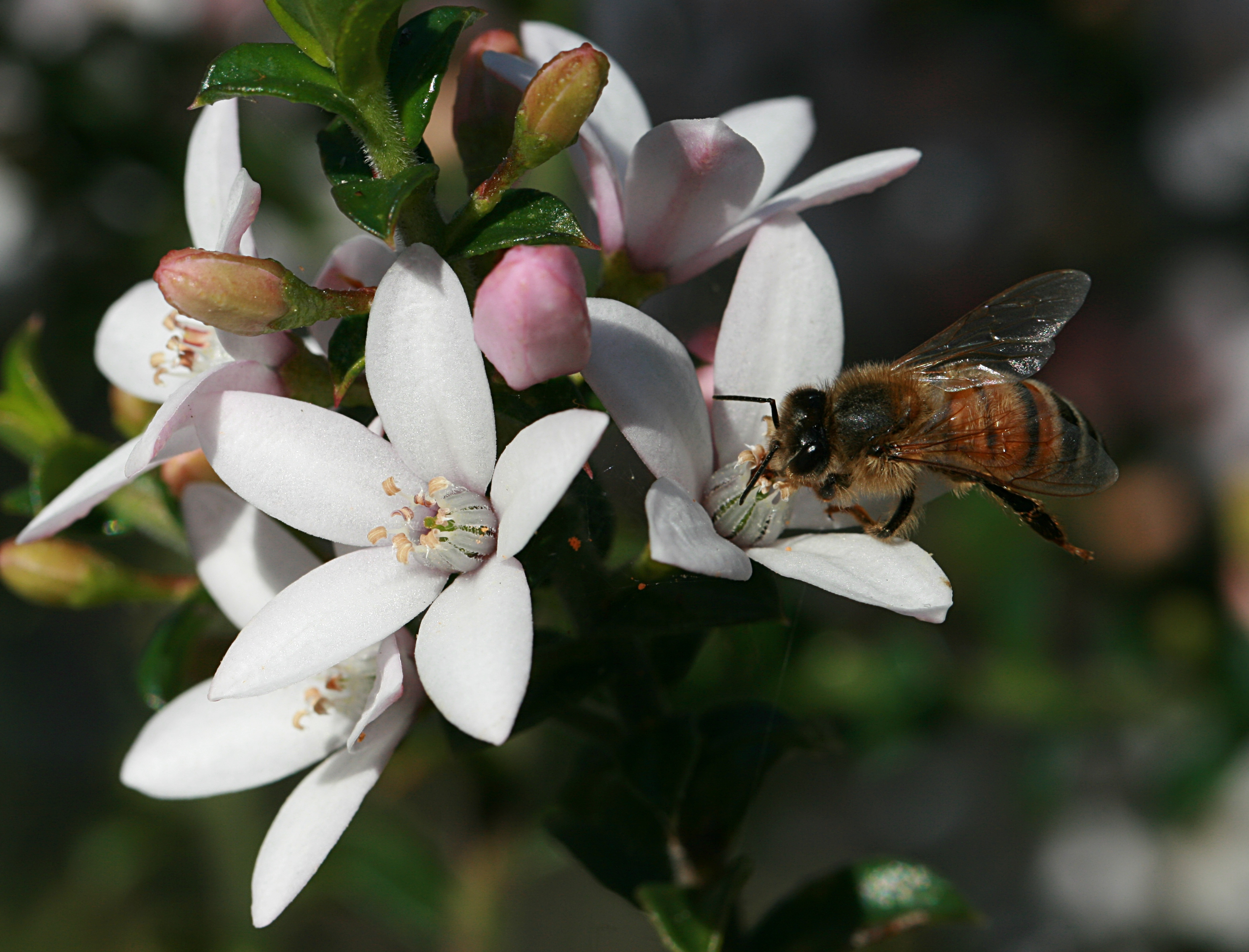

Scientific classification
- Kingdom: Plantae
- Clade: Embryophytes
- Clade: Tracheophytes
- Clade: Spermatophytes
- Clade: Angiosperms
- Clade: Eudicots
- Clade: Rosids
- Order: Sapindales
- Family: Rutaceae
- Genus: Philotheca
- Species: P. buxifolia

Binomial name
- Philotheca buxifolia (Sm.) Paul G.Wilson

Synonyms
- Eriostemon buxifolius Sm.

= Philotheca buxifolia =

Species of flowering plant

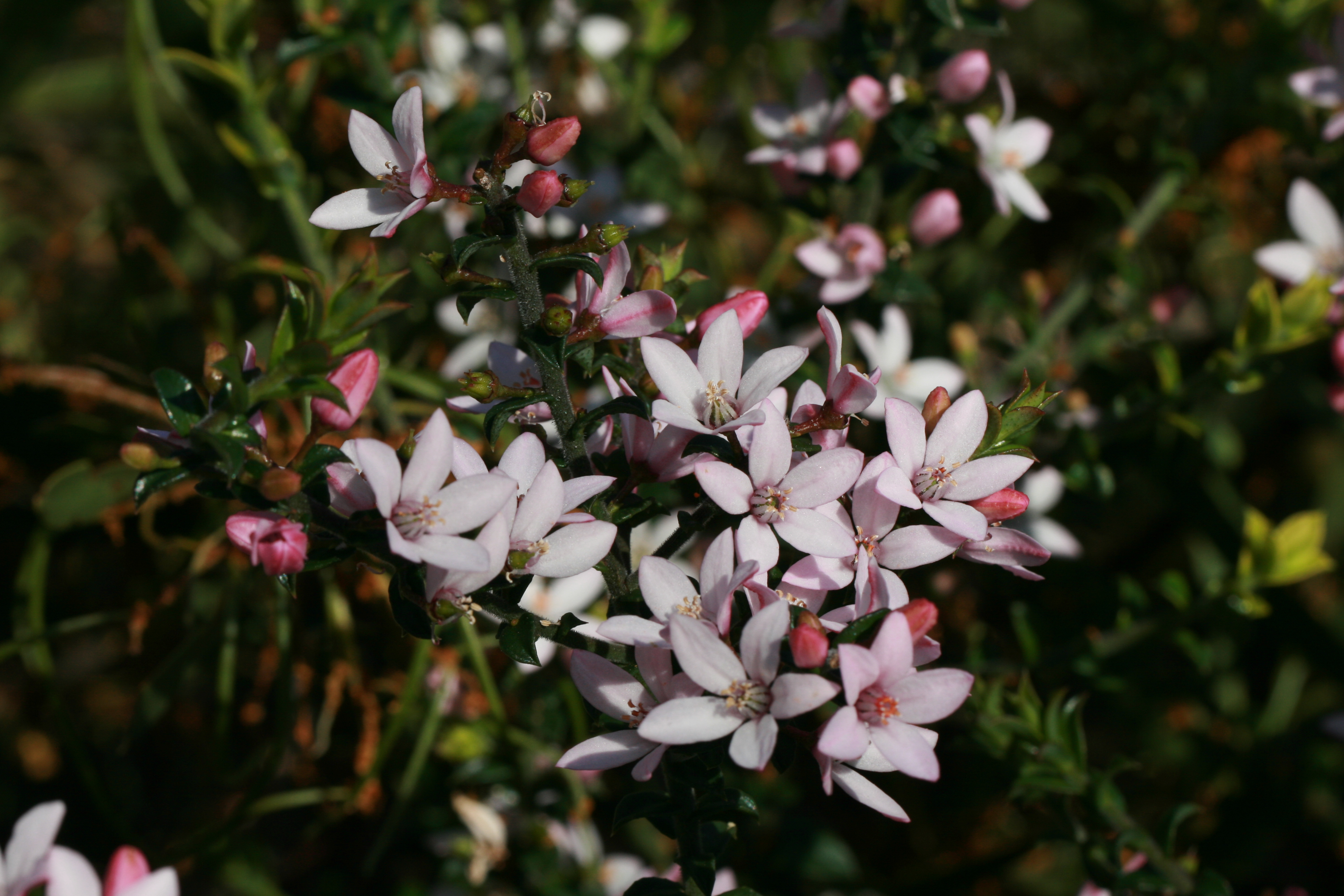
Pink flowers in bloom on Middle Head, Sydney

Philotheca buxifolia is a species of flowering plant in the family Rutaceae and is endemic to New South Wales. It is a shrub with more or less oblong leaves and solitary white to pink flowers arranged singly on the ends of branchlets.

== Description ==
Philotheca buxifolia is a shrub that typically grows to a height of 1.3 m (4 ft 3 in) and has branchlets with short, stiff hairs. The leaves are round to broadly elliptical or egg-shaped with the narrower end towards the base, 6–12 mm (0.24–0.47 in) long and wedge-shaped or heart-shaped near the base. The flowers are borne singly on the ends of branchlets, each flower on a pedicel 2–4 mm (0.079–0.157 in) long. The sepals are broadly triangular and fleshy, 1–1.5 mm (0.039–0.059 in) long and the petals white to pink, broadly elliptical and 8–15 mm (0.31–0.59 in) long. The ten stamens are free from each other with a prominent appendage on the anther. Flowering occurs from winter to spring and the fruit is about 7 mm (0.28 in) long with a beak about 3 mm (0.12 in) long.

== Taxonomy ==
This species was first formally described in 1809 by James Edward Smith in The Cyclopaedia from specimens "gathered near Port Jackson by Dr White". In 1998, Paul G. Wilson changed the name to Philotheca buxifolius and described three subspecies in the journal Nuytsia. The names of the three subspecies are accepted by the Australian Plant Census:

- Eriostemon buxifolia (Sm.) Paul G.Wilson subsp. buxifolia, commonly known as box-leaf waxflower has leaves are round to broadly elliptical, not folded lengthwise and have a heart-shaped base, and is mainly found in the Sydney area;
- Eriostemon buxifolia subsp. falcata Paul G.Wilson has leaves are round to broadly elliptical, not folded lengthwise and have a heart-shaped base, the subspecies only occurring in the Jervis Bay area;
- Eriostemon buxifolia subsp. obovata Paul G.Wilson has egg-shaped leaves with the narrower end towards the base and a wedge-shaped base, the subspecies occurring near Gosford and near Ulladulla.

== Distribution ==
Philotheca buxifolia grows in heath on sandstone in coastal areas of New South Wales between Gosford and Ulladulla.
