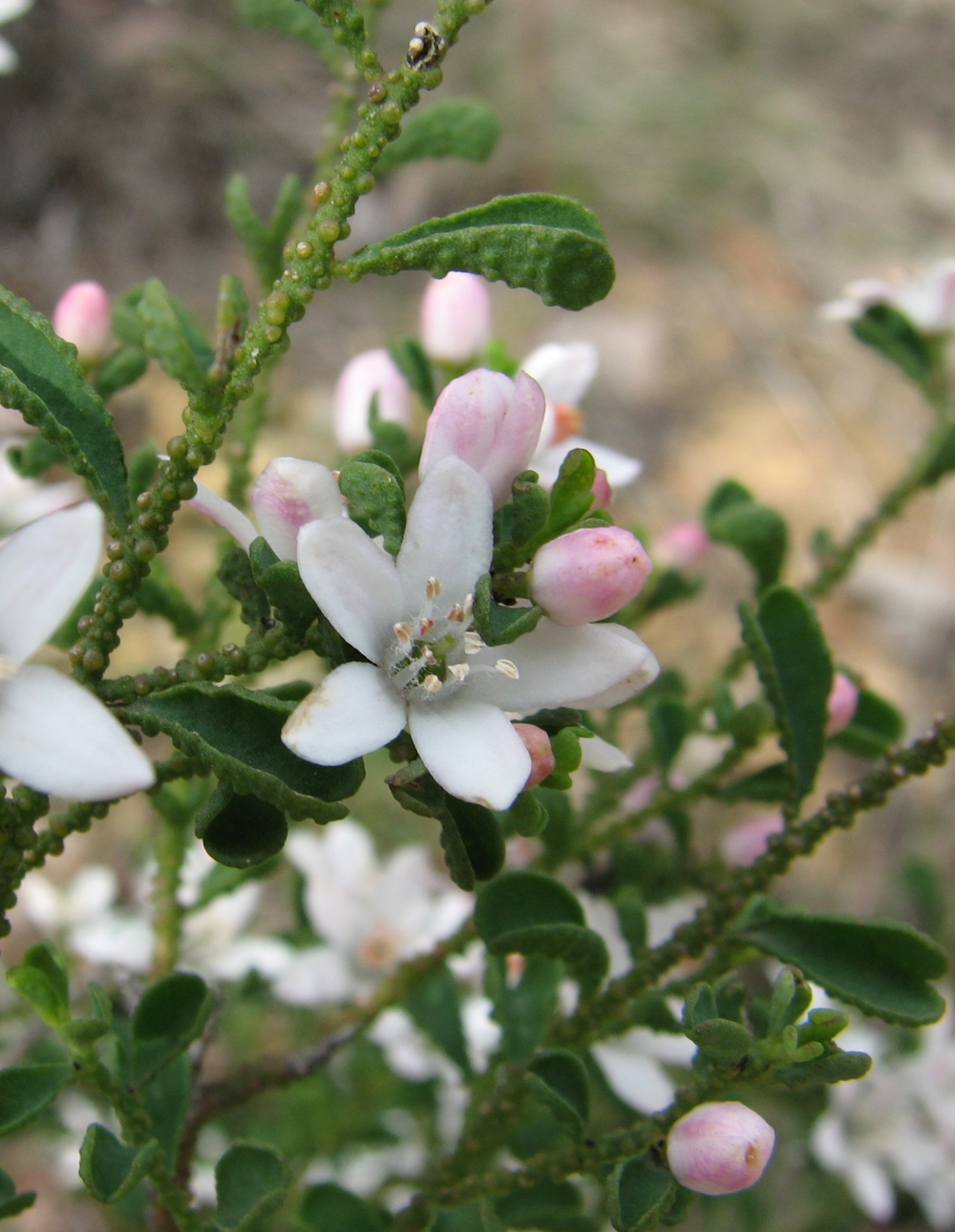
- Philotheca verrucosa

Scientific classification
- Kingdom: Plantae
- Clade: Embryophytes
- Clade: Tracheophytes
- Clade: Spermatophytes
- Clade: Angiosperms
- Clade: Eudicots
- Clade: Rosids
- Order: Sapindales
- Family: Rutaceae
- Genus: Philotheca
- Species: P. verrucosa

Binomial name
- Philotheca verrucosa (A.Rich.) Paul G.Wilson

Synonyms
- ?Eriostemon dolabratus Rchb.; Eriostemon obcordatum A.Cunn. ex Hook. orth. var.; Eriostemon obcordatus A.Cunn. ex Hook.; Eriostemon verrucosum A.Rich. orth. var.; Eriostemon verrucosus A.Rich.

= Philotheca verrucosa =

Fairy wax-flower

Species of plant

Philotheca verrucosa, commonly known as fairy wax-flower or Bendigo wax-flower, is a species of flowering plant in the family Rutaceae and is endemic to south-eastern Australia. It is a small shrub with prominently glandular-warty branchlets, heart-shaped or egg-shaped leaves with the narrower end towards the base, and white flowers usually arranged singly in leaf axils.

== Description ==
Philotheca verrucosa is a shrub or undershrub that typically grows to a height of about 80 cm (31 in), rarely to 2 m (6 ft 7 in), and has prominently glandular warty branchlets. The leaves are sessile, heart-shaped to egg-shaped with the narrower end towards the base, 6–15 mm (0.24–0.59 in) long and 4–7 mm (0.16–0.28 in) wide and glandular warty on the lower surface. The leaves are flat or folded lengthwise. The flowers are mostly arranged singly in leaf axils on a peduncle 0.5–2 mm (0.020–0.079 in) long, the pedicel 1–4 mm (0.039–0.157 in) long. The five sepals are more or less round, fleshy and about 1 mm (0.039 in) long. The five petals are white, elliptic and about 6 mm (0.24 in) long and the ten stamens are hairy. Flowering occurs from August to October.

== Taxonomy ==
Fairy wax-flower was first formally described in 1834 by Achille Richard who gave it the name Erisotemon verrucosus in Voyage de découvertes de l'Astrolabe - Botanique. In 1998, Paul Wilson changed the name to Philotheca verrucosa in the journal Nuytsia.

== Distribution and habitat ==
Philotheca verrucosa grows on rocky hills in forest and woodland, sometimes in sandy heathland and occurs in South Australia, Victoria and Tasmania. It is found in the Mount Lofty Ranges in South Australia, in the Grampians, Bendigo district and Gippsland in Victoria and in eastern Tasmania.

== Use in horticulture ==
This philotheca can be grown from tip cuttings and is frost hardy and reasonably drought-tolerant. Some forms have double or multiple whorls of petals.

Philotheca 'Flower Girl' is a hybrid cultivar, thought to be a cross between this species and Philotheca myoporoides. It produces a profusion of light pink to white flowers during winter and spring and grows to between 1 and 2 metres high.
