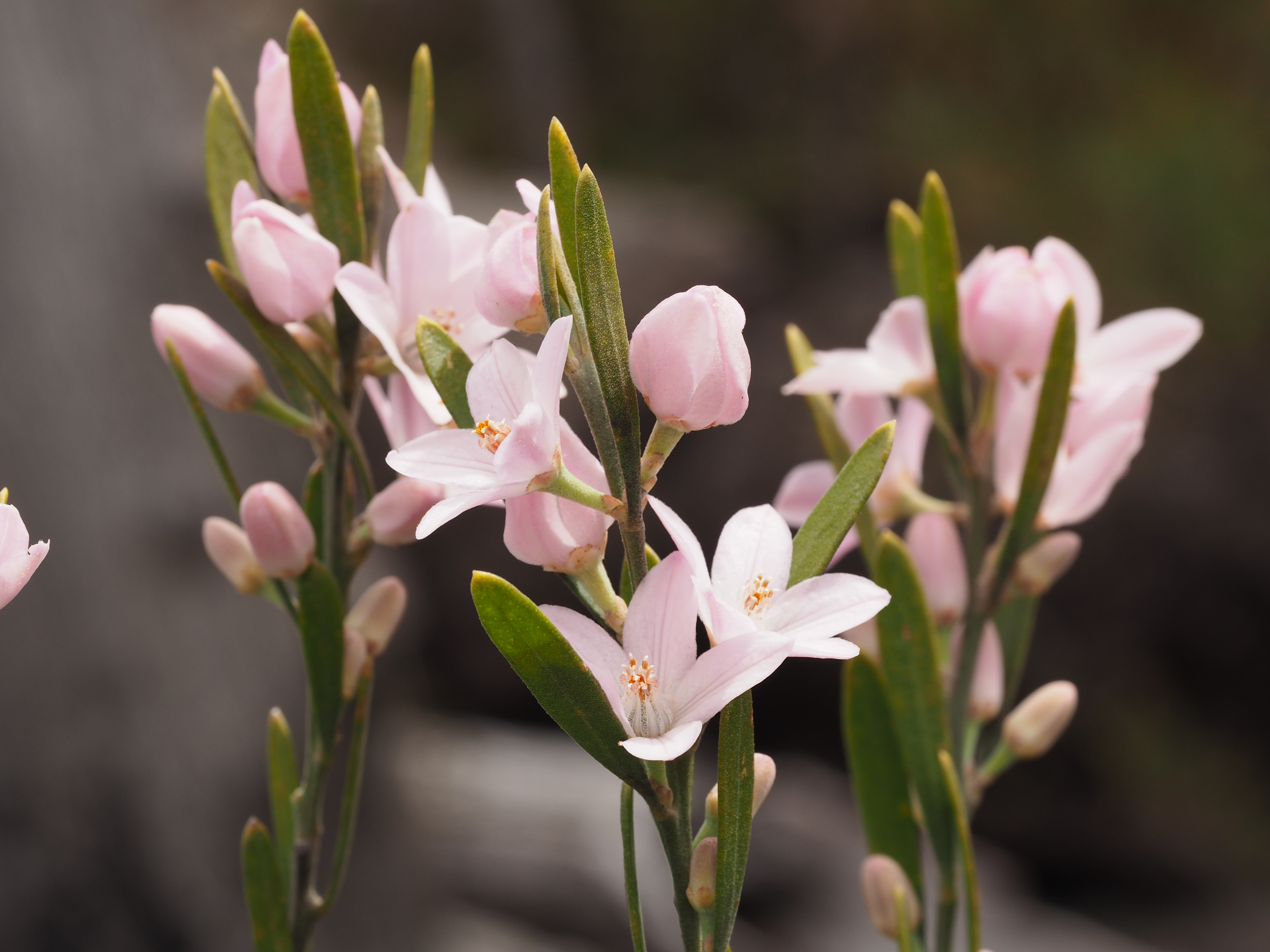
- Eriostemon australasius foliage and flowers

Scientific classification
- Kingdom: Plantae
- Clade: Tracheophytes
- Clade: Angiosperms
- Clade: Eudicots
- Clade: Rosids
- Order: Sapindales
- Family: Rutaceae
- Genus: Eriostemon
- Species: E. australasius

Binomial name
- Eriostemon australasius Pers.

Synonyms
- Crowea saligna Graham nom. inval., pro syn.; Eriostemon australasius Pers. subsp. australasius; Eriostemon lanceolatum C.F.Gaertn. orth. var.; Eriostemon lanceolatus C.F.Gaertn. nom. illeg.; Eriostemon salicifolia Sm. orth. var.; Eriostemon salicifolius Sm.

= Eriostemon australasius =

Pink wax flower

Species of flowering plant

Eriostemon australasius commonly known as pink wax flower is a plant in the citrus family Rutaceae and is endemic to eastern Australia. It is an erect, bushy shrub with narrow oblong leaves and pink flowers with five petals in late winter and early spring.

== Description ==
Eriostemon australasius is an erect, bushy shrub which grows to a height of 1–2 m (3–7 ft). It has simple leaves that are narrow oblong in shape, 20–80 millimetres (0.8–3 in) long, 8–14 millimetres (0.3–0.6 in) long and are covered with tiny star-like hairs when young, although the hairs may only be visible with a magnifying glass. The flowers are arranged singly in leaf axils, mostly near the ends of the branches, on a stalk 4–12 millimetres (0.2–0.5 in) long. At the base of each flower are five to twelve sepal-like bracteoles. There are five pink to reddish petals which are about 18 millimetres (0.7 in) long and are covered with similar hairs to those on the leaves, but become smooth with maturity. Flowering occurs in late winter and early spring.

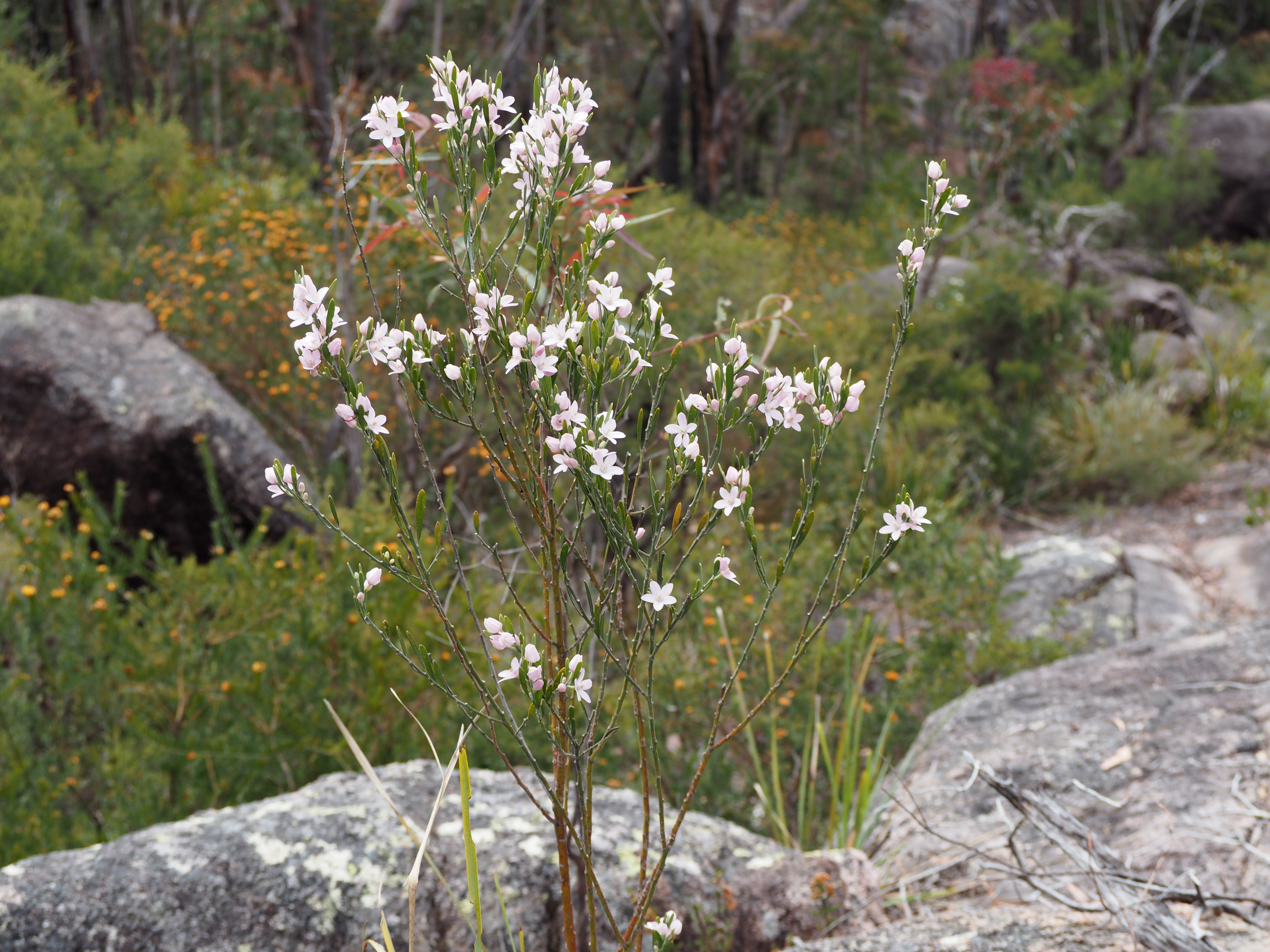
Habit in the Gibraltar Range National Park

== Taxonomy and naming ==
Eriostemon australasius was first formally described in 1805 by Christiaan Persoon and the description was published in Synopsis plantarum, seu enchiridium botanicum, complectens enumerationem systematicam specierum. The specific epithet (australasius) is derived from the Latin word australis meaning "south". The common name is derived from the thick waxy petals.

== Distribution and habitat ==
Pink wax flower grows in heathland and dry eucalyptus woodlands from Lake Conjola on the New South Wales south coast northwards along the coast to Fraser Island in Queensland.

== Use in horticulture ==
Eriostemon australasius was first cultivated in England in 1824. It adapts fairly readily to the garden situation, as long as it has good drainage, in dappled shade to full sun. The roots benefit from some shelter. It can be propagated from cuttings or from seed with difficulty and is moderately frost tolerant.
