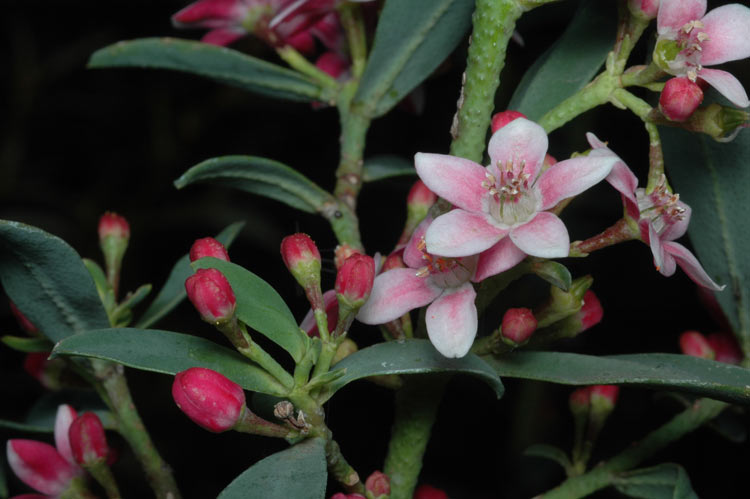
- Subspecies myoporoides in the ANBG

Scientific classification
- Kingdom: Plantae
- Clade: Tracheophytes
- Clade: Angiosperms
- Clade: Eudicots
- Clade: Rosids
- Order: Sapindales
- Family: Rutaceae
- Genus: Philotheca
- Species: P. myoporoides

Binomial name
- Philotheca myoporoides (DC.) Bayly

Synonyms
- Eriostemon myoporoides DC.

= Philotheca myoporoides =

Long-leaf wax-flower

Species of flowering plant

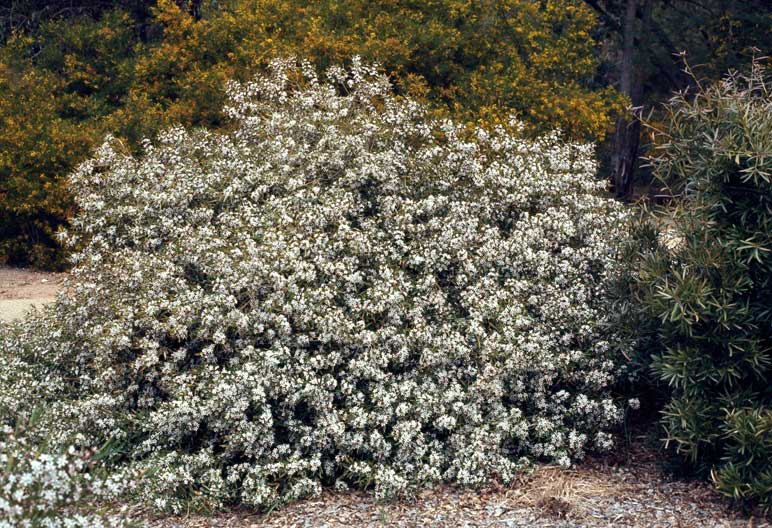
Habit of subsp. myoporoides

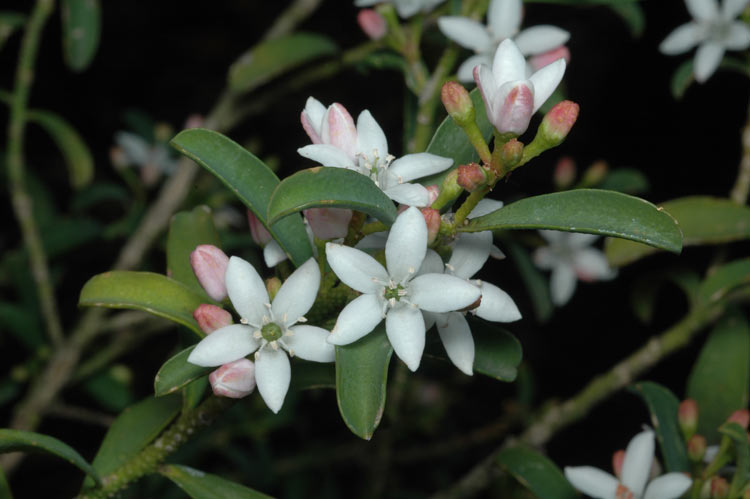
Subspecies acuta in the ANBG

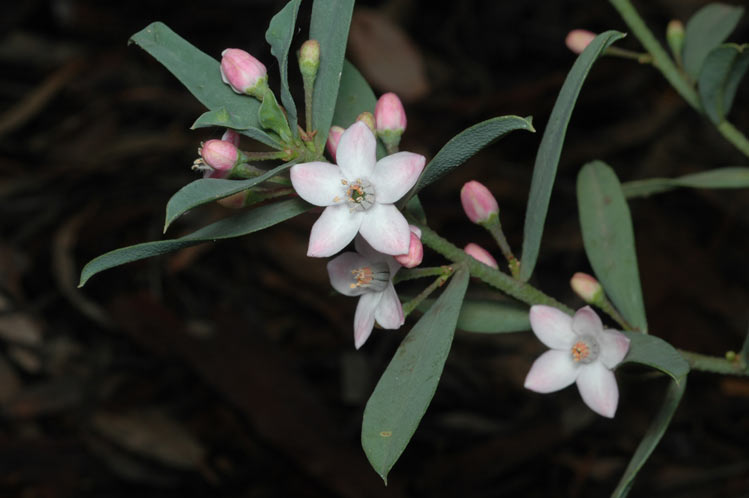
Subspecies brevipedunculata in the ANBG

Philotheca myoporoides, commonly known as long-leaf wax flower, is a species of flowering plant in the family Rutaceae and is endemic to south-eastern Australia. It is a shrub with sessile, oblong to egg-shaped, glandular-warty leaves and white to pink flowers arranged singly in leaf axils. Prior to 1998 it was known as Eriostemon myoporoides.

== Description ==
Philotheca myoporoides is a species of shrub that typically grows to a height of 2 m (6 ft 7 in). The leaves are sessile, oblong to broadly egg-shaped, glandular-warty, papery to leathery, 15–110 mm (0.59–4.33 in) long and 4–20 mm (0.16–0.79 in) wide with a prominent midrib. The flowers are arranged singly or in groups of up to eight, in leaf axils on a peduncle up to 20 mm (0.79 in) long, each flower on a pedicel 1–10 mm (0.039–0.394 in) long. The sepals are broadly triangular, about 1 mm (0.039 in) long and 1.5–2 mm (0.059–0.079 in) wide and the petals are white to pink, about 8 mm (0.31 in) long with a prominent keel. Flowering mainly occurs in spring and autumn and the fruit is about 7 mm (0.28 in) long with a beak about 3 mm (0.12 in) long.

== Taxonomy ==
This species was first formally described in 1824 by Swiss botanist Augustin Pyramus de Candolle who gave it the name Eriostemon myoporoides in his book Prodromus Systematis Naturalis Regni Vegetabilis. In 1998 Michael James Bayly changed the name to Philotheca myoporoides in the journal Muelleria.

In the same journal, Bayly described nine subspecies, four of which are accepted by the Australian Plant Census, and in 2001, Andrew Rozefelds described a fifth subspecies:

- Philotheca myoporoides subsp. acuta (Blakely) Bayly has oblong-elliptic or egg-shaped leaves 13–30 mm (0.51–1.18 in) long and 5–10 mm (0.20–0.39 in) wide;
- Philotheca myoporoides subsp. brevipedunculata Bayly has oblong, elliptic or lance-shaped leaves 40–45 mm (1.6–1.8 in) long and 2–8 mm (0.079–0.315 in) wide;
- Philotheca myoporoides subsp. euroensis Bayly has broad elliptic leaves 15–35 mm (0.59–1.38 in) long and 6–12 mm (0.24–0.47 in) wide;
- Philotheca myoporoides (DC.) Bayly subsp. myoporoides has oblong-elliptic or lance-shaped leaves 20–50 mm (0.79–1.97 in) long and 4–10 mm (0.16–0.39 in) wide;
- Philotheca myoporoides subsp. petraea Rozefelds has leaves 8–16 mm (0.31–0.63 in) long and 4–7 mm (0.16–0.28 in) wide.

== Distribution and habitat ==
Subspecies acuta grows on rocky sandstone hills from Lockhart to near Cobar. Subspecies brevipedunculata is found coastal areas to mountain summits between Sassafras and Moruya in south-eastern New South Wales. Subspecies euroensis grows among granite boulders on the Strathbogie Ranges near Euroa in north-eastern Victoria. Subspecies myoporoides grows in forest and heathland, usually near watercourses, mostly along the Great Dividing Range from the northern border of New South Wales to near Healesville in Victoria. Subspecies petraea is only known from rocky areas on Mount Stewart, west of Gelantipy in north-eastern Victoria.

== Ecology ==
Caterpillars of the orchard butterfly feed on this species.

== Use in horticulture ==
The species is well adapted to cultivation, and plants are commercially available at nurseries in Australia. The species prefers a well-drained position in light shade. Established plants tolerate both dry periods and moderate frost. Plants may be propagated from semi-mature cuttings, though some forms are slow to take root.
