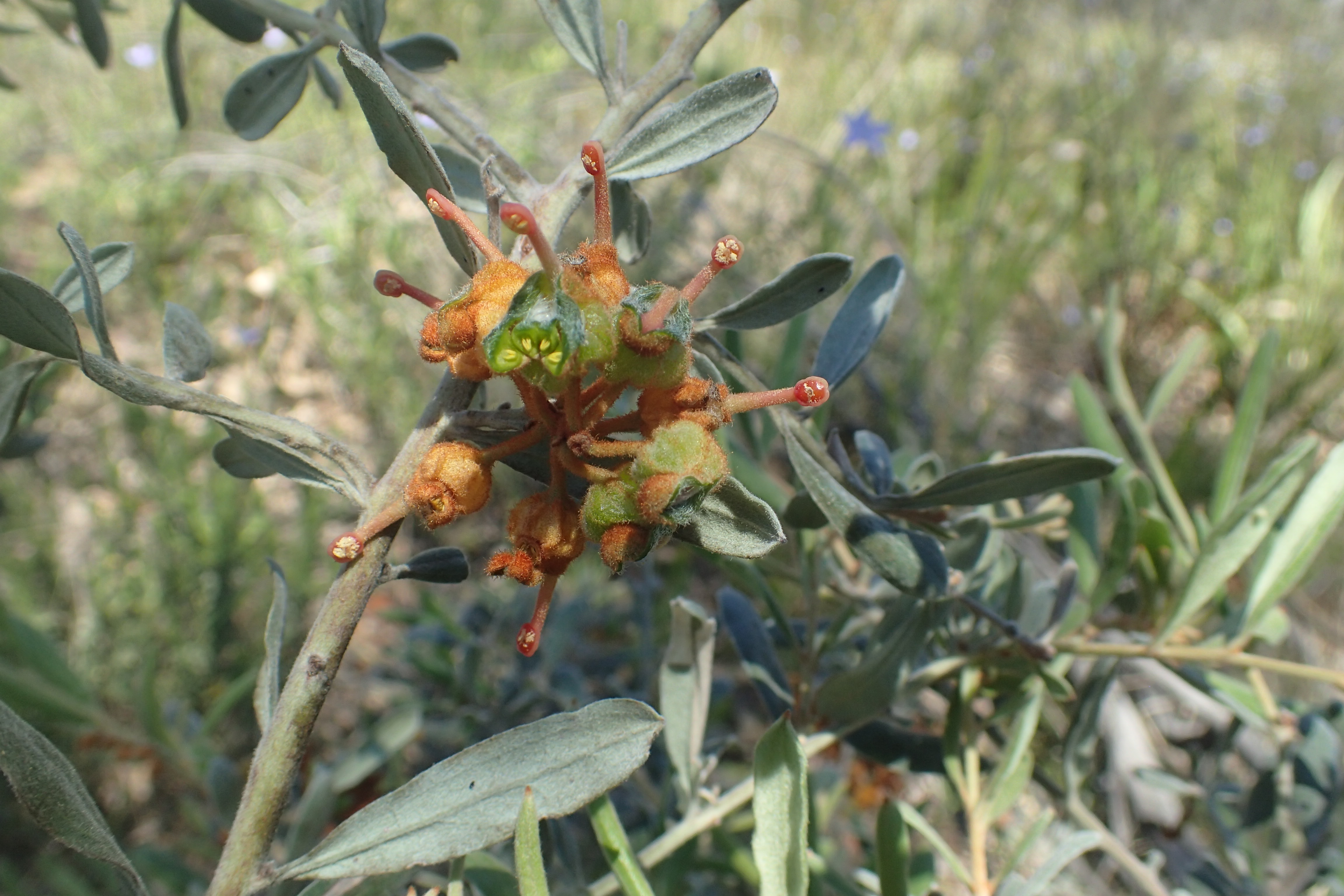

Conservation status
- Least Concern (IUCN 3.1)

Scientific classification
- Kingdom: Plantae
- Clade: Embryophytes
- Clade: Tracheophytes
- Clade: Spermatophytes
- Clade: Angiosperms
- Clade: Eudicots
- Order: Proteales
- Family: Proteaceae
- Genus: Grevillea
- Species: G. floribunda

Binomial name
- Grevillea floribunda R.Br.

= Grevillea floribunda =

Seven dwarfs grevillea

Species of shrub endemic to Australia

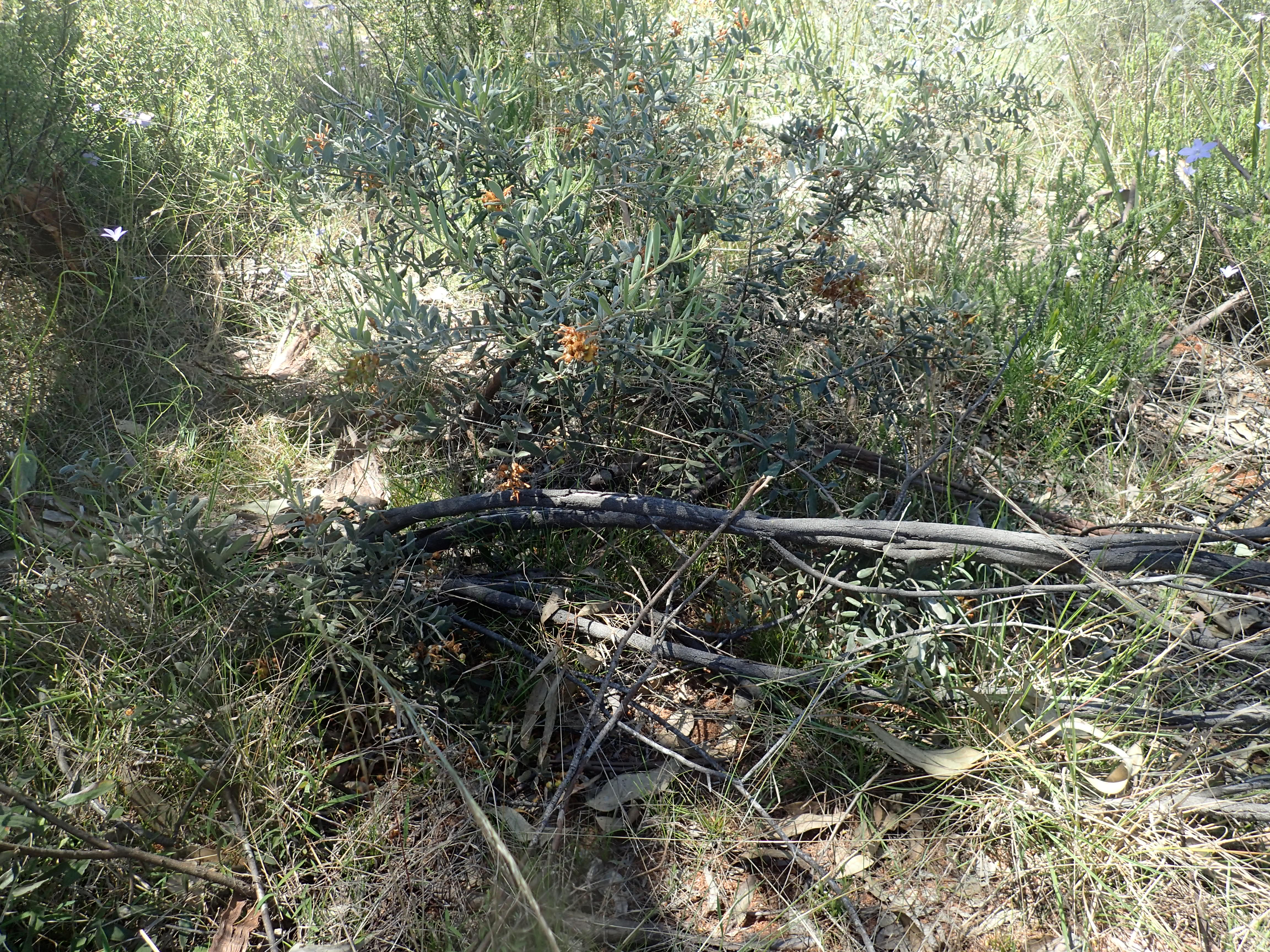
Habit in the Pilliga Scrub

Grevillea floribunda, commonly known as seven dwarfs grevillea, is a species of flowering plant in the family Proteaceae and is endemic to eastern Australia. It is a spreading shrub with oblong to egg-shaped leaves with the narrower end towards the base and groups of six to twenty flowers covered with rusty brown hairs.

== Description ==
Grevillea floribunda is a spreading shrub that typically grows to a height of 0.4–1.8 m (1 ft 4 in – 5 ft 11 in). Its leaves are oblong to egg-shaped, mostly 20–80 mm (0.79–3.15 in) long and 2–20 mm (0.079–0.787 in) wide and softly-hairy on the lower surface. The flowers are arranged in groups of six to twenty, usually at the end of branches, the perianth is greenish and covered with woolly, rusty-brown hairs and the pistil is 9.0–19.5 mm (0.35–0.77 in) long. The ovary is sessile and the style is reddish. Flowering occurs in all months with a peak in spring and the fruit is a hairy follicle 10.5–17 mm (0.41–0.67 in) long.

== Taxonomy ==
Grevillea floribunda was first formally described in 1830 by Robert Brown in his Supplementum primum Prodromi florae Novae Hollandiae. The specific epithet means "profusely flowering".

In 1994, Peter M. Olde and Neil R. Marriott described two subspecies of G. floribunda and the names are accepted by the Australian Plant Census:

- Grevillea floribunda R.Br. subsp. floribunda
- Grevillea floribunda subsp. tenella Olde & Marriott

== Distribution and habitat ==
Seven dwarfs grevillea grows in forest and woodland and is widespread on the tablelands and western slopes of New South Wales and in south-eastern Queensland. There is a single doubtful record from the Killawarra Forest in Victoria. Subspecies tenella is restricted to the Darling Downs region of Queensland.

== Conservation status ==
Grevillea floribunda is currently listed as least concern on the IUCN Red List of Threatened Species. It is an extremely widespread and common species with a stable overall population and no known major threats. Minor, localised threats include inappropriate fire regimes and land clearing for agriculture.
