= List of Ptilotus species =

This is a list of species in the genus Ptilotus accepted by Plants of the World Online as a December 2024: All species are native to continental Australia, mostly in the arid regions, though one species also occurs in Tasmania and another in Malesia.

- Ptilotus actinocladus T.Hammer & R.W.Davis (W.A.)
- Ptilotus aervoides (F.Muell.) F.Muell. – mat mulla mulla (W.A., N.T., S.A.)
- Ptilotus albidus (C.A.Gardner) Benl (W.A.)
- Ptilotus alexandri Benl (W.A.)
- Ptilotus andersonii R.W.Davis (W.A.)
- Ptilotus angustifolius (Benl) T.Hammer (S.A.)
- Ptilotus aphyllus Benl (W.A.)
- Ptilotus appendiculatus Benl (W.A.)
- Ptilotus aristatus Benl (N.T., S.A.)
- Ptilotus arthrolasius F.Muell. (W.A., N.T.)
- Ptilotus astrolasius F.Muell. (W.A., N.T.)
- Ptilotus auriculifolius (A.Cunn. ex Moq.) F.Muell. (W.A.)
- Ptilotus axillaris (Benth.) F.Muell. – mat mulla mulla (W.A.)
- Ptilotus barkeri Benl – Barkers mulla mulla (S.A.)
- Ptilotus beardii Benl – low mulla mulla (W.A.)
- Ptilotus beckerianus (F.Muell.) F.Muell. ex J.M.Black – ironstone mulla mulla (S.A.)
- Ptilotus benlii R.W.Davis & T.Hammer (W.A.)
- Ptilotus blackii Benl (W.A.)
- Ptilotus brachyanthus (Benth.) F.Muell. (Qld.)
- Ptilotus caespitulosus F.Muell. – salt lake mulla-mulla (W.A.)
- Ptilotus calostachyus F.Muell. – weeping mulla mulla (W.A., N.T., Qld.)
- Ptilotus capensis (Benl) A.R.Bean (Qld.)
- Ptilotus capitatus (F.Muell.) C.A.Gardner (W.A., N.T.)
- Ptilotus carinatus Benl (W.A.)
- Ptilotus carlsonii F.Muell. (W.A.)
- Ptilotus chamaecladus Diels (W.A.)
- Ptilotus chippendalei Benl (W.A., S.A., N.T.)
- Ptilotus chortophytus (Diels) Schinz (W.A.)
- Ptilotus chrysocomus R.W.Davis (W.A.)
- Ptilotus clementii (Farmar) Benl – tassel top (W.A., N.T., Qld.)
- Ptilotus clivicola R.W.Davis & T.Hammer (W.A.)
- Ptilotus comatus Benl (N.T.)
- Ptilotus conicus R.Br. (W.A., N.T., New Guinea, Indonesia)
- Ptilotus corymbosus R.Br. (W.A., N.T., Qld.)
- Ptilotus crinitus R.W.Davis & T.Hammer (N.T.)
- Ptilotus crispus Benl (W.A.)
- Ptilotus crosslandii (F.Muell.) Benl (W.A.)
- Ptilotus daphneae Lally (W.A.)
- Ptilotus davisii T.Hammer – Davis's mulla mulla (W.A.)
- Ptilotus decalvatus Benl (W.A.)
- Ptilotus decipiens (Benth.) C.A.Gardner ex A.W.Hill – false mulla mulla (W.A., N.T., S.A., Qld.)
- Ptilotus declinatus Nees – curved mulla mulla (W.A.)
- Ptilotus disparilis Lally – shrubby fox-tail (S.A.)
- Ptilotus dissitiflorus (F.Muell.) F.Muell. (N.T., Qld.)
- Ptilotus distans (R.Br.) Poir. (N.T., W.A.)
- Ptilotus divaricatus (Gaudich.) F.Muell. – climbing mulla mulla (W.A.)
- Ptilotus drummondii (Moq.) F.Muell. – narrowleaf mulla mulla (W.A.)
- Ptilotus eremita (S.Moore) T.Hammer & R.W.Davis (W.A.)
- Ptilotus eriotrichus (Ewart & J.White) P.S.Short (W.A.)
- Ptilotus erubescens Schltdl. – hairy heads, hairy tails (N.S.W., S.A., Vic.)
- Ptilotus esquamatus (Benth.) F.Muell (W.A.)
- Ptilotus exaltatus Nees – tall mulla mulla, large pink pussy-tails, pink mulla mulla, lambs tail, showy foxtail (N.S.W., S.A., Qld., N.T., W.A., Vic.)
- Ptilotus exiliflorus R.W.Davis (W.A.)
- Ptilotus extenuatus Benl (N.S.W (extinct), Qld.)
- Ptilotus falcatus R.W.Davis & T.Hammer (W.A.)
- Ptilotus fasciculatus W.Fitzg. (W.A.)
- Ptilotus fusiformis (R.Br.) Poir. – skeleton plant, pom-pom bottlebrush (W.A., N.T., Qld.)
- Ptilotus gardneri Benl (W.A., N.T.)
- Ptilotus gaudichaudii (Steud.) J.M.Black – paper foxtail (N.S.W., S.A., Qld., N.T., W.A.)
- Ptilotus giganteus (A.Cunn. ex Moq.) R.W.Davis & R.Butcher (W.A., N.T.)
- Ptilotus gomphrenoides F. Muell. ex Benth. (W.A.)
- Ptilotus grandiflorus F.Muell. (W.A.)
- Ptilotus halophilus R.W.Davis (W.A.)
- Ptilotus helichrysoides (F.Muell.) F.Muell. (W.A.)
- Ptilotus helipteroides (F.Muell.) F.Muell. – hairy mulla mulla, woolly tails (W.A., N.T., S.A., Qld.)
- Ptilotus holosericeus (Moq.) F.Muell. (W.A.)
- Ptilotus humilis (Nees) F.Muell. (W.A.)
- Ptilotus incanus (R.Br.) Poir. –grey fox-tail (W.A., N.T., S.A., Qld.)
- Ptilotus indivisus Benl – tangled silver-tails (N.S.W.)
- Ptilotus johnstonianus W.Fitzg. (W.A.)
- Ptilotus kenneallyanus Benl (W.A.)
- Ptilotus lanatus A.Cunn. ex Moq. (W.A.)
- Ptilotus latifolius R.Br. tangled mulla mulla, white foxtail (W.A., S.A., N.T., N.S.W.)
- Ptilotus lazaridis Benl (W.A.)
- Ptilotus leucocoma (Moq.) F.Muell. – small purple foxtail (N.S.W., Qld.)
- Ptilotus lophotrichus Benl (N.T.)
- Ptilotus luteolus (Benl & H.Eichler) R.W.Davis (W.A.)
- Ptilotus maconochiei Benl (Qld.)
- Ptilotus macrocephalus (R.Br.) Poir. – green pussytails, featherheads (N.S.W., Vic., S.A.)
- Ptilotus manglesii (Lindl.) F.Muell - pom poms (W.A.)
- Ptilotus marduguru Benl (W.A.)
- Ptilotus mitchellii Benl (W.A.)
- Ptilotus modestus T.Hammer – paper foxtail (N.S.W., N.T., Qld., S.A.)
- Ptilotus mollis Benl (W.A.)
- Ptilotus murrayi F.Muell. – Murray's fox-tail (W.A., S.A, Qld.)
- Ptilotus nobilis (Lindl.) F.Muell. – yellowtails, regal foxtail, tall mulla mulla (W.A., S.A., N.T., Qld., N.S.W., Vic.)
- Ptilotus obovatus (Gaudich.) F.Muell. – smoke bush, silver bush, silver tails, cotton bush (W.A., S.A., N.T., Qld., N.S.W., Vic.)
- Ptilotus parviflorus (Lindl.) F. Muell. (Qld, N.S.W., N.T.)
- Ptilotus parvifolius (F.Muell.) F.Muell. – shrubby fox-tail (S.A.)
- Ptilotus pedleyanus Benl & H.Eichler (Qld.)
- Ptilotus polakii F.Muell. (W.A.)
- Ptilotus polystachyus (Gaudich.) F.Muell. – long tails, Prince of Wales feather, bottle-washers, long pussy-tails (W.A., N.T., S.A., Qld., N.S.W., Vic.)
- Ptilotus procumbens Benl (W.A.)
- Ptilotus propinquus Lally – Gammon Ranges fox-tail (S.A.)
- Ptilotus pseudohelipteroides Benl – woolly mulla mulla, hairy mulla mulla (W.A., N.T., S.A., Qld.)
- Ptilotus psilorhachis T.Hammer & R.W.Davis
- Ptilotus pyramidatus (Moq.) F.Muell. – pyramid mulla mulla (W.A.)
- Ptilotus remotiflorus Benl – Cordillo Downs pussy-tail (Qld., S.A., N.S.W.)
- Ptilotus rigidus Lally (W.A.)
- Ptilotus robynsianus Benl – Robyns pussy-tail (S.A.)
- Ptilotus roei (F.Muell. ex Benth.) F.Muell. (W.A.)
- Ptilotus rotundatus Benl (N.T.)
- Ptilotus rotundifolius (F.Muell.) F.Muell. - royal mulla mulla (W.A.)
- Ptilotus royceanus Benl (W.A., N.T.)
- Ptilotus schwartzii (F.Muell.) Tate – horse mulla mulla (W.A., S.A., N.T., Qld.)
- Ptilotus semilanatus (Lindl.) J.M.Black (Qld., N.S.W., Vic., S.A.)
- Ptilotus seminudus (J.M.Black) J.M.Black – rabbit tails (Vic., N.S.W., S.A.)
- Ptilotus senarius A.R.Bean (Qld.)
- Ptilotus sericostachyus (Nees) F.Muell. (W.A.)
- Ptilotus sessilifolius (Lindl.) Benl – silver-tails, crimson foxtail (W.A., N.T., S.A., Qld., N.S.W., Vic.)
- Ptilotus spathulatus (R.Br.) Poir. – pussytails, cats paws, possumtails (W.A., S.A., N.S.W., Vic., Tas.)
- Ptilotus spicatus Benth. (W.A., N.T., Qld.)
- Ptilotus stipitatus Benl (W.A.)
- Ptilotus stirlingii (Lindl.) F.Muell. – Stirling's mulla mulla (W.A.)
- Ptilotus subspinescens R.W.Davis (W.A.)
- Ptilotus symonii Benl – Symon's mulla mulla (W.A., S.A.)
- Ptilotus tetrandrus Benl (W.A.)
- Ptilotus trichocephalus Benl (W.A.)
- Ptilotus uncinellus (A.R.Bean) T.Hammer (Qld.)
- Ptilotus unguiculatus T.Hammer (W.A.)
- Ptilotus villosiflorus F.Muell. (W.A.)
- Ptilotus whitei (J.M.Black) Lally (S.A., N.T.)
- Ptilotus wilsonii Benl (W.A.)
- Ptilotus xerophilus T.Hammer & R.W.Davis
- Ptilotus yapukaratja R.W.Davis & T.Hammer
