= Ptilotus halophilus =

Scientific classification
- Kingdom: Plantae
- Clade: Tracheophytes
- Clade: Angiosperms
- Clade: Eudicots
- Order: Caryophyllales
- Family: Amaranthaceae
- Genus: Ptilotus
- Species: P. halophilus

Binomial name
- Ptilotus halophilus R.W.Davis

Species of grass-like plant

Ptilotus halophilus is a species of flowering plant in the family Amaranthaceae and is endemic to Western Australia. It is a prostrate or low-lying perennial herb, with spoon-shaped, egg-shaped or elliptic leaves, spherical to oval spikes with a silvery sheen.

== Description ==
Ptilotus halophilus is a prostrate or low-growing perennial herb, that typically grows to a height of up to 8 cm (3.1 in). The leaves at the base of the plant are spoon-shaped and arranged in a rosette. The stem leaves are arranged alternately, spoon-shaped, egg-shaped or elliptical, 8–70 mm (0.31–2.76 in) long and 2–12 mm (0.079–0.472 in) wide. The flowers are light green with a pink tinge, and arranged in spherical to oval spikes 12–30 mm (0.47–1.18 in) long and 20–30 mm (0.79–1.18 in) wide with an overall silvery sheen. There are egg-shaped to narrowly egg-shaped bracts 6.2–7.5 mm (0.24–0.30 in) long, and narrowly egg-shaped, translucent bracteoles 5–6 mm (0.20–0.24 in) long. The outer tepals are linear, 10–14 mm (0.39–0.55 in) long and the inner tepals 8–12.5 mm (0.31–0.49 in) long. There are 2 stamens and 2 staminodes, the style is curved, 0.9–1.0 mm (0.035–0.039 in) long and fixed to the side of the ovary. Flowering occurs from June to November.

== Taxonomy ==
Ptilotus halophilus was first formally described in 2004 by Robert Wayne Davis in the journal Nuytsia, from specimens collected on the southern margin of Lake Altham in 1994. The specific epithet (halophilus) means 'salt-loving'.

== Distribution and habitat ==
This species of Ptilotus grows in saline sand on sand dunes near salt lakes in open mallee woodlands and is only known from Lake Altham and Lake Hurlstone in the Avon Wheatbelt and Mallee bioregions of Western Australia.

== Conservation status ==
Ptilotus halophilus is listed as "not threatened" by the Government of Western Australia Department of Biodiversity, Conservation and Attractions.

== See also ==
- List of Ptilotus species
