= Ptilotus crispus =

Conservation status
- Priority One — Poorly Known Taxa (DEC)

Scientific classification
- Kingdom: Plantae
- Clade: Tracheophytes
- Clade: Angiosperms
- Clade: Eudicots
- Order: Caryophyllales
- Family: Amaranthaceae
- Genus: Ptilotus
- Species: P. crispus

Binomial name
- Ptilotus crispus Benl

Species of grass-like plant

Ptilotus crispus is a species of flowering plant in the family Amaranthaceae and is endemic to the north of Western Australia. It is a more or less prostrate ephemeral herb, with oblong to linear stem leaves, and oval to cone-shaped or cylindrical spikes of sometimes more than 60 white flowers.

== Description ==
Ptilotus crispus is a more or less prostrate, ephemeral herb up to 20 cm (7.9 in) tall and spreading to more than 30 cm (12 in) or more with three to five stems. Up to 20 leaves are sparsely arranged along each stem, oblong to almost linear 5–10 mm (0.20–0.39 in) long and 2–3.5 mm (0.079–0.138 in) wide tapering to a petiole up to 1.2 mm (0.047 in) long. There are no leaves at the base of the plant. The flowers are white and arranged singly or in pairs in leaf axils in up to 30 oval to cone-shaped spikes 4–6 mm (0.16–0.24 in) long and 4.5 mm (0.18 in) wide with 10 to 15 flowers, or cylindrical spikes 15 mm (0.59 in) and 4 mm (0.16 in) wide. The bracts are 0.6–0.9 mm (0.024–0.035 in) long 0.4–0.6 mm (0.016–0.024 in) wide and the bracteoles are 1.0–1.2 mm (0.039–0.047 in) long and 0.4–0.6 mm (0.016–0.024 in) wide. The tepals enlarge to 2.2–2.8 mm (0.087–0.110 in) long after flowering, and there are five stamens and a central style, the ovary expanding to 0.7 mm (0.028 in) long.

== Taxonomy ==
Ptilotus crispus was first formally described in 1984 by Gerhard Benl in the journal Nuytsia from specimens collected 3.6 km (2.2 mi) north of the Kalumburu airstrip in 1985. The specific epithet (crispus) means 'little curled' or 'litle crinkled', referring to the hairs on the tepals.

== Distribution and habitat ==
Ptilotus crispus grows on rock outcrops, on the summit of ridges on sandstone, and on coastal dunes in the Northern Kimberley bioregion of northern Western Australia.

== Conservation status ==
This species of Ptilotus is listed as "Priority One" by the Government of Western Australia Department of Biodiversity, Conservation and Attractions, meaning that it is known from only one or a few locations where it is potentially at risk.

== See also ==
- List of Ptilotus species
