= Ptilotus marduguru =

Conservation status
- Priority Two — Poorly Known Taxa (DEC)

Scientific classification
- Kingdom: Plantae
- Clade: Tracheophytes
- Clade: Angiosperms
- Clade: Eudicots
- Order: Caryophyllales
- Family: Amaranthaceae
- Genus: Ptilotus
- Species: P. marduguru

Binomial name
- Ptilotus marduguru Benl

Species of herb

Ptilotus marduguru is a species of flowering plant in the family Amaranthaceae and is endemic to northern inland Western Australia. It is a perennial herb with upright branches, the shoots, leaves and flower parts covered with soft, woolly hairs, and greenish white or creamy green flowers.

== Description ==
Ptilotus marduguru is a perennial herb that typically grows to a height of up to 70 cm (28 in) and 50 cm (20 in) wide, with several upright branches forming open bushes. The shoots, leaves and outer flower parts are covered with soft, woolly hairs. There are crowded, spatula-shaped up to about 80 mm (3.1 in) long and 30 mm (1.2 in) wide at the base of the plant and stem leaves up to 120 mm (4.7 in) or more long. The flowers are greenish white or creamy green and densely arranged in a candle-like spike 5–30 cm (2.0–11.8 in) long. There are narrowly egg-shaped bracts 4.3–5.0 mm (0.17–0.20 in) long and more or less heart-shaped bracteoles mostly 4.2–4.5 mm (0.17–0.18 in) long with a prominent midrib. The outer tepals are straw-coloured, 7.7–8.1 mm (0.30–0.32 in) long and the inner tepals 7.0–7.8 mm (0.28–0.31 in) long. There are five stamens and the style is 3.2–3.8 mm (0.13–0.15 in) long and fixed to the centre of the ovary.

== Taxonomy ==
Ptilotus marduguru was first formally described in 1980 by Gerard Benl in the journal Nuytsia from specimens collected by Alex George near Godfreys Tank on the Canning Stock Route in 1979. The specific epithet (marduguru) refers to the aboriginal name "marduguru marduguru", which means 'downy", referring to "the fine short hairs as on the feathers of young birds".

== Distribution ==
This species of Ptilotus has been recorded as "common on rocky slopes of sandstone gorges" and is only known from the type location in the Great Sandy Desert bioregion of inland northern Western Australia.

== Conservation status ==
Ptilotus marduguru is listed as "Priority Two" by the Government of Western Australia Department of Biodiversity, Conservation and Attractions, meaning that it is poorly known and from one or a few locations.

== See also ==
- List of Ptilotus species
