= Ptilotus kenneallyanus =

Scientific classification
- Kingdom: Plantae
- Clade: Tracheophytes
- Clade: Angiosperms
- Clade: Eudicots
- Order: Caryophyllales
- Family: Amaranthaceae
- Genus: Ptilotus
- Species: P. kenneallyanus

Binomial name
- Ptilotus kenneallyanus Benl

Species of herb

Ptilotus kenneallyanus is a species of flowering plant in the family Amaranthaceae and is endemic to northern Western Australia. It is a perennial herb with diamond- to spatula-shaped leaves and spherical to oval spikes of purplish pink to pinkish-mauve flowers.

== Description ==
Ptilotus kenneallyanus is a perennial herb that typically grows to a height of 10–40 cm (3.9–15.7 in) and has several more or less erect stems. Its leaves are diamond-shaped to spatula-shaped, mostly 8–45 mm (0.31–1.77 in) long and 3–20 mm (0.12–0.79 in) wide. The flowers are arranged in oval, cylindrical or hemispherical spikes 25 mm (0.98 in) long and 15 mm (0.59 in) in diameter with profuse, purplish pink to pinkish-mauve flowers. There are membranous hairy, egg-shaped bracts about 5 mm (0.20 in) long and broadly egg-shaped bracteoles 5.5 mm (0.22 in) long and 2.2 mm (0.087 in) wide with a prominent midrib. The outer tepals are 7.0–7.5 mm (0.28–0.30 in) long and the inner tepals 5.8–6.5 mm (0.23–0.26 in) long. There are two stamens and three staminodes and the ovary is more or less club-shaped to spherical.

== Taxonomy ==
Ptilotus kenneallyanus was first formally described in 1979 by Gerard Benl in the journal Nuytsia from specimens collected on the Edgar Ranges south-east of Broome by Kevin Francis Kenneally in 1976. The specific epithet (kenneallyanus) honours Kevin Keneally, a botanist of the Western Australian Herbarium and the collector of the type specimens.

== Distribution ==
This species of Ptilotus is common on red ironstone in sandy soil on stony hills in the Dampierland and Great Sandy Desert bioregions of northern Western Australia.

== See also ==
- List of Ptilotus species
