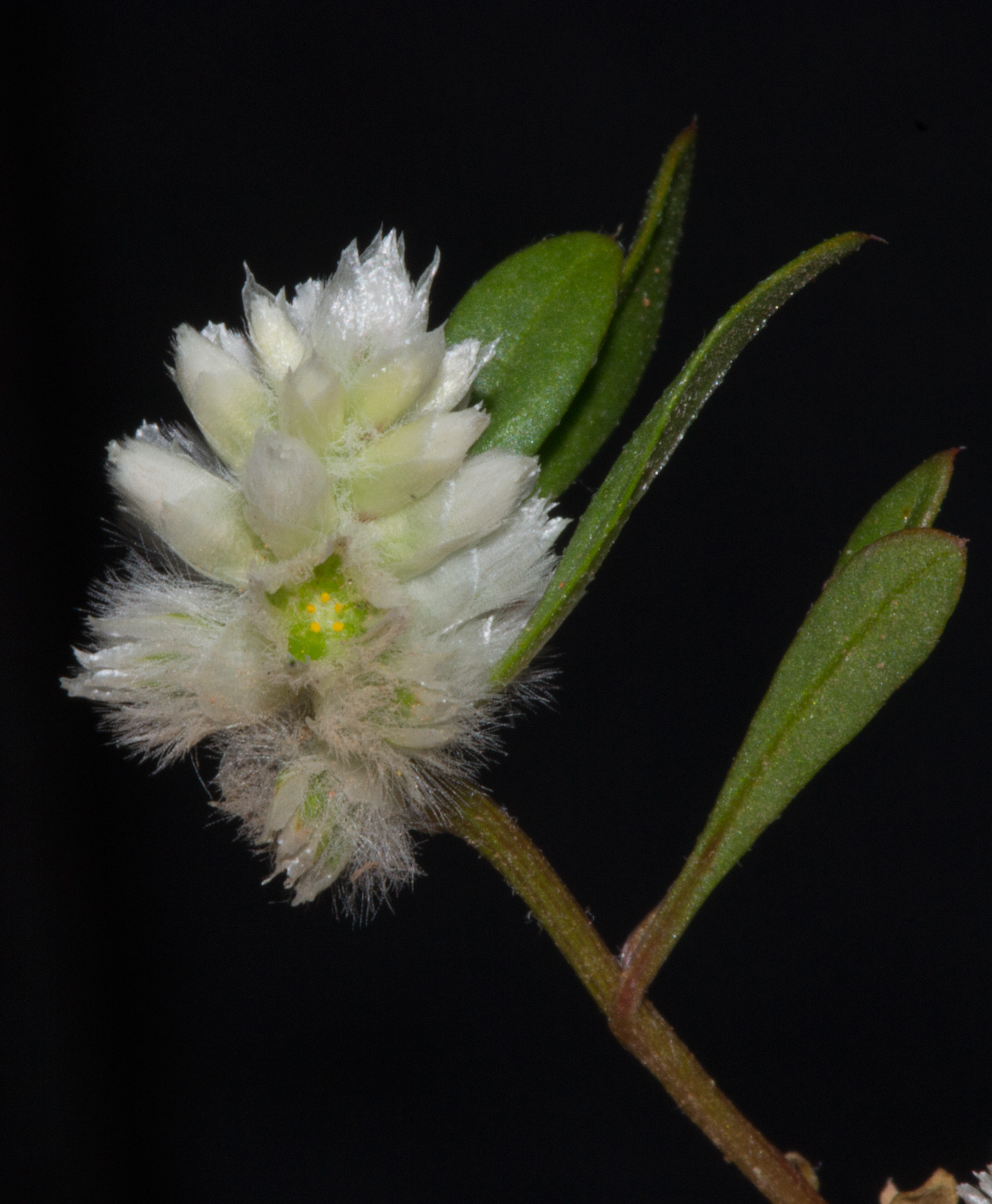

Scientific classification
- Kingdom: Plantae
- Clade: Tracheophytes
- Clade: Angiosperms
- Clade: Eudicots
- Order: Caryophyllales
- Family: Amaranthaceae
- Genus: Ptilotus
- Species: P. humilis

Binomial name
- Ptilotus humilis (Nees) F.Muell.

Synonyms
- Ptilotus humilis (Nees) F.Muell. var. humilis; Trichinium humile Nees; Trichinium nanum F.Muell.

= Ptilotus humilis =

Species of herb

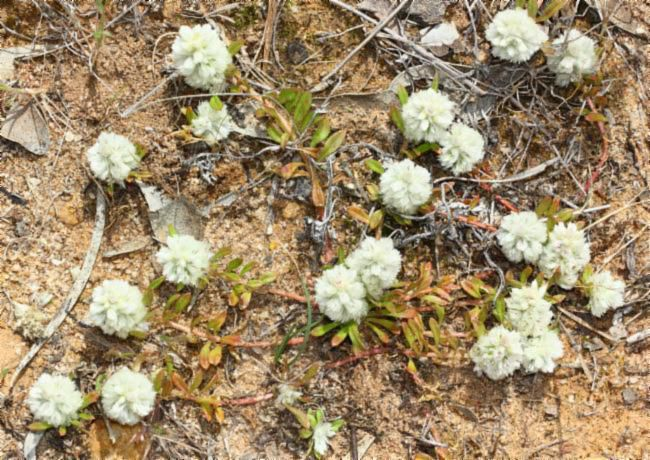
Habit

Ptilotus humilis is a species of flowering plant in the family Amaranthaceae and is endemic to the south-west of Western Australia. It is a prostrate to low-lying annual herb with several stems, oblong to spatula-shaped leaves and oval or cylindrical spikes of green, white or pink flowers.

== Description ==
Ptilotus humilis is a prostrate to low-lying annual herb, that typically grows to a height of 10–60 cm (3.9–23.6 in), its stems and leaves covered with soft hairs, later glabrous. Its leaves are oblong to spatula-shaped, mostly 3–70 mm (0.12–2.76 in) long and 1–12 mm (0.039–0.472 in) wide. The flowers are arranged in oval or cylindrical spikes with colourless, glabrous bracts 3.7–5.5 mm (0.15–0.22 in) long and similar bracteoles 3.7–5.2 mm (0.15–0.20 in) long. The outer tepals are 5.0–7.5 mm (0.20–0.30 in) long and the inner tepals 5.0–7.7 mm (0.20–0.30 in) long with a tuft of hairs on the inner surface. The style is 0.4 mm (0.016 in) long and centrally fixed to the ovary. Flowering occurs from September to November.

== Taxonomy ==
This species was first formally described in 1845 by Nees von Esenbeck who gave it the name Trichinium humile in Lehmann's Plantae Preissianae from specimens collected near York in 1839.

In 1868, Ferdinand von Mueller transferred the species to Ptilotus as P. humilis in his Fragmenta Phytographiae Australiae.

== Distribution and habitat ==
Ptilotus humilis grows in sandy soils, often over granite, in the Avon Wheatbelt, Coolgardie, Esperance Plains, Geraldton Sandplains, Jarrah Forest, Mallee and Swan Coastal Plain bioregions of south-western Western Australia.

== Conservation status ==
Ptilotus humilis is listed as "not threatened" by the Government of Western Australia Department of Biodiversity, Conservation and Attractions.

== See also ==
- List of Ptilotus species
