= Ptilotus chrysocomus =

Scientific classification
- Kingdom: Plantae
- Clade: Tracheophytes
- Clade: Angiosperms
- Clade: Eudicots
- Order: Caryophyllales
- Family: Amaranthaceae
- Genus: Ptilotus
- Species: P. chrysocomus

Binomial name
- Ptilotus chrysocomus R.W.Davis

Species of grass-like plant

Ptilotus chrysocomus is a species of flowering plant in the family Amaranthaceae and is endemic to inland Western Australia. It is a compact, perennial shrub with erect, glabrous stems, narrowly lance-shaped stem leaves with the narrower end towards the base, yellow to straw-coloured, oval to spherical spikes of flowers with five stamens.

== Description ==
Ptilotus chrysocomus is an erect, compact shrub that typically grows up to 50 cm (20 in) high, and has erect, hairy stems. The leaves are sessile, glabrous, narrowly lance-shaped with the narrower end towards the base, 4–10 mm (0.16–0.39 in) long and 0.8–1.2 mm (0.031–0.047 in) wide. The flowers are yellow to straw-coloured, borne in oval to spherical heads 5–11 mm (0.20–0.43 in) long, 7–10 mm (0.28–0.39 in) wide, usually in a close panicle. There are egg-shaped, straw-coloured bracts 1.2–1.5 mm (0.047–0.059 in) long, and broadly egg-shaped to more or less round bracteoles. The outer tepals are 3.4–4.0 mm (0.13–0.16 in) long and hairy on the outside, the inner tepals 3.6–4.2 mm (0.14–0.17 in) long and hairy outside with finer hairs than those of the outer tepals. There are five stamens, the style is S-shaped, is 1.4–1.7 mm (0.055–0.067 in) long and the ovary is glabrous, round to oval, 1.0–1.2 mm (0.039–0.047 in) long. Flowering occurs from August to September.

== Taxonomy ==
Ptilotus chrysocomus was first formally described in 2004 by Robert Davis in the journal Nuytsia from specimens collected 4 km (2.5 mi) east-north-east of the abandoned Blue Hill Station in the Little Sandy Desert in 1999. The specific epithet (chrysocomus) means 'golden hairs', referring to the hairs on the tepals.

== Distribution and habitat ==
This species of Ptilotus grows in brown, sandy clays on the bases of breakaways and on rocky scree slopes in the Gascoyne, Little Sandy Desert and Murchison bioregions of inland Western Australia.

== Conservation status ==
Ptilotus chrysocomus is listed as "Priority One" by the Government of Western Australia Department of Biodiversity, Conservation and Attractions, meaning that it is known from only one or a few locations where it is potentially at risk.

== See also ==
- List of Ptilotus species
