= Ptilotus alexandri =

Scientific classification
- Kingdom: Plantae
- Clade: Tracheophytes
- Clade: Angiosperms
- Clade: Eudicots
- Order: Caryophyllales
- Family: Amaranthaceae
- Genus: Ptilotus
- Species: P. alexandri

Binomial name
- Ptilotus alexandri Benl

Species of grass-like plant

Ptilotus alexandri is a species of flowering plant in the family Amaranthaceae and is endemic to the far west of Western Australia. It is an erect, annual herb with spatula-shaped leaves, spikes of pink flowers and glossy black seeds.

== Description ==
Ptilotus alexandri is an erect annual herb that typically grows to 10–30 cm (3.9–11.8 in) high and has several more or less erect, sometimes hairy stems. Its leaves are spatula-shaped, 5–45 mm (0.20–1.77 in) long and 2–12 mm (0.079–0.472 in) wide. The flowers are pink, borne in oval or cylindrical spikes of 30 to 70, 13–30 mm (0.51–1.18 in) long and 15–23 mm (0.59–0.91 in) wide. There are hairy bracts 4.8–5.3 mm (0.19–0.21 in) long and hairy bracteoles 6.0–6.4 mm (0.24–0.25 in) long at the base of the flowers. The outer tepals are 8.9–10 mm (0.35–0.39 in) long and the inner tepals 8.6–9 mm (0.34–0.35 in) long. Flowering occurs from August to October and the seeds are 1.0–1.2 mm (0.039–0.047 in) long and glossy black.

== Taxonomy ==
Ptilotus alexandri was first formally described in 1974 by Gerhard Benl in the journal Nuytsia from specimens collected by Alex George near Quobba Homestead, north of Carnarvon in 1970. The specific epithet (alexandri) honours the discoverer of the species and collector of the type specimens, "in recognition of his contributions to the flora of Western Australia".

== Distribution and habitat ==
Ptilotus alexandri grows in sand on sand dunes in the Carnarvon and Yalgoo bioregions of far western Western Australia.

== Conservation status ==
This species of Ptilotus is listed as "Priority Two" by the Government of Western Australia Department of Biodiversity, Conservation and Attractions, meaning that it is poorly known and from one or a few locations.

== See also ==
- List of Ptilotus species
