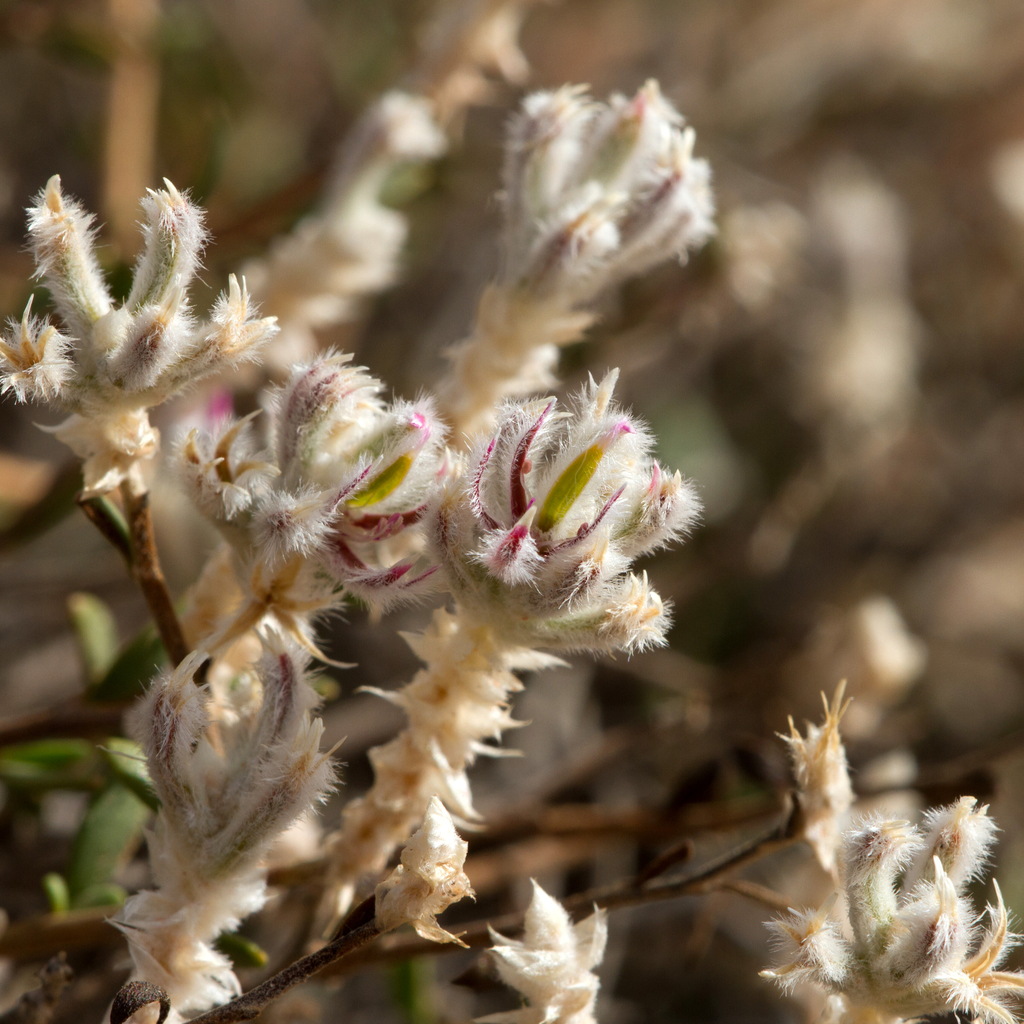
- Near Coober Pedy

Scientific classification
- Kingdom: Plantae
- Clade: Tracheophytes
- Clade: Angiosperms
- Clade: Eudicots
- Order: Caryophyllales
- Family: Amaranthaceae
- Genus: Ptilotus
- Species: P. barkeri

Binomial name
- Ptilotus barkeri Benl

= Ptilotus barkeri =

Species of grass-like plant

Ptilotus barkeri, commonly known as Barkers mulla mulla, is a species of flowering plant in the family Amaranthaceae and is endemic to South Australia. It is an erect, woody subshrub with many branches, almost sessile narrowly elliptic to almost linear leaves, and spikes of white flowers sometimes tinged with pink.

== Description ==
Ptilotus barkeri is an erect, woody, rigid subshrub that typically grows up to 40 cm (16 in) high and has many branches. The leaves are egg-shaped, sometimes with the narrower end towards the base, up to 10 mm (0.39 in) long and 4 mm (0.16 in) wide. The flowers are borne in hemispherical or oval spikes up to 30 mm (1.2 in) long and 4 mm (0.16 in) wide with about 35 white flowers, sometimes tinged with pink. There are hairy bracts 2.6–3.2 mm (0.10–0.13 in) long and hairy bracteoles mostly 3.8–4.2 mm (0.15–0.17 in) long with a brownish midrib. The outer tepals are 7.5–8.0 mm (0.30–0.31 in) long and 0.8–1 mm (0.031–0.039 in) wide, the inner tepals are slightly shorter but distinctly narrower. There are four fertile stamens and a single staminode, the ovary is club-shaped and the style is up to 3 mm (0.12 in) long. Flowering occurs between May and August.

== Taxonomy ==
Ptilotus barkeri was first formally described in 1989 by Gerhard Benl in the Journal of the Adelaide Botanic Gardens from specimens collected in 1988. The specific epithet (barkeri) honours William Robert Barker who recognised this species as different from others in the genus.

== Distribution and habitat ==
Ptilotus barkeri grows in gypsum or limestone soils in the north-central part of South Australia where it grows on the slopes of breakaways with scattered Acacia species, chenopods and herbs.

== See also ==
- List of Ptilotus species
