= Ptilotus lophotrichus =

Scientific classification
- Kingdom: Plantae
- Clade: Tracheophytes
- Clade: Angiosperms
- Clade: Eudicots
- Order: Caryophyllales
- Family: Amaranthaceae
- Genus: Ptilotus
- Species: P. lophotrichus

Binomial name
- Ptilotus lophotrichus Benl

Synonyms
- Ptilotus lophotrichus Benl var. lophotrichus; Ptilotus lophotrichus var. villosus Benl

Species of grass-like plant

Ptilotus lophotrichus is a species of flowering plant in the family Amaranthaceae and is endemic to the north of the Northern Territory. It was first formally described in 1964 by Gerhard Benl in the Transactions of the Royal Society of South Australia from specimens collected in Arnhem Land by Herbert Basedow in 1928.

This species of Ptilotus is found in the Arnhem Coast and Arnhem Plateau bioregions of the Northern Territory, and is listed as "data deficient" under the Northern Territory Government Territory Parks and Wildlife Conservation Act.

== See also ==
- List of Ptilotus species
