= Ptilotus blackii =

Conservation status
- Priority Three — Poorly Known Taxa (DEC)

Scientific classification
- Kingdom: Plantae
- Clade: Tracheophytes
- Clade: Angiosperms
- Clade: Eudicots
- Order: Caryophyllales
- Family: Amaranthaceae
- Genus: Ptilotus
- Species: P. blackii

Binomial name
- Ptilotus blackii Benl

Species of grass-like plant

Ptilotus beardii is a species of flowering plant in the family Amaranthaceae and is endemic to Western Australia. It is an erect, perennial herb with sessile, narrowly egg-shaped or elliptic leaves, and spikes of pink flowers.

== Description ==
Ptilotus beardii is an erect, perennial herb that typically grows to a height of 25–35 cm (9.8–13.8 in). The leaves at the base of the plant are sessile, usually egg-shaped with the narrower end towards the base, 50–70 mm (2.0–2.8 in) long and 4–12 mm (0.16–0.47 in) wide. The stem leaves are egg-shaped, sometimes with the narrower end toward the base, or elliptic, 10–33 mm (0.39–1.30 in) long and 2.2–8 mm (0.087–0.315 in) wide. The flowers are borne in oval or hemispherical spikes 12–20 mm (0.47–0.79 in) long and 10–25 mm (0.39–0.98 in) wide with up to 25 pink or purple flowers. There are bracts 7.3–9.5 mm (0.29–0.37 in) long and bracteoles 7.8–9 mm (0.31–0.35 in) long. The outer tepals are 0.7–1 mm (0.028–0.039 in) longer than the inner tepals. There are two fertile stamens and three staminode, the ovary is on a stalk and the style is 3.5–4.0 mm (0.14–0.16 in) long. Flowering occurs from May to September.

== Taxonomy ==
Ptilotus blackii was first formally described in 1964 by Gerhard Benl in the Transactions of the Royal Society of South Australia from specimens collected by Richard Helms in the Great Victoria Desert, 220 km (140 mi) east-north-east of Kalgoorlie in 1891. The specific epithet (blackii) honours John McConnell Black, who first described this plant as a variety of Trichinium exultatum.

== Distribution and habitat ==
This species of Ptilotus grows in sandy clay or sand in a few locations in the Coolgardie, Great Victoria Desert and Murchison bioregions of Western Australia.

== Conservation status ==
Ptilotus blackii is listed as "Priority Three" by the Government of Western Australia Department of Biodiversity, Conservation and Attractions, meaning that it is poorly known and known from only a few locations but is not under imminent threat.

== See also ==
- List of Ptilotus species
