= Ptilotus decalvatus =

Scientific classification
- Kingdom: Plantae
- Clade: Tracheophytes
- Clade: Angiosperms
- Clade: Eudicots
- Order: Caryophyllales
- Family: Amaranthaceae
- Genus: Ptilotus
- Species: P. decalvatus

Binomial name
- Ptilotus decalvatus Benl

Species of grass-like plant

Ptilotus decalvatus is a species of flowering plant in the family Amaranthaceae and is endemic to the far north of Western Australia. It is an erect annual herb, with narrowly linear to almost thread-like leaves, and oval to cylindrical spikes of 30 to 80 dark mauve to reddish flowers.

== Description ==
Ptilotus decalvatus is an erect annual herb up to 50 cm (20 in) tall, its young branches and branchlets covered with woolly white hairs. The leaves are arranged in the lower part of the stems, narrowly linear to almost thread-like, up to 45 mm (1.8 in) long and 0.5–0.8 mm (0.020–0.031 in) wide. There are no leaves at the base of the plant. The flowers are dark mauve to reddish and arranged in compact oval to cylindrical spikes 15–35 mm (0.59–1.38 in) long, each spike with 30 to 80 flowers on a pedicel about 0.5 mm (0.020 in) long. The tepals are about 4.2 mm (0.17 in) long, the outer tepals boat-shaped and the inner tepals slightly broader and flatter, and the style is 1.2 mm (0.047 in) long. Flowering occurs from May to July and the seeds are glossy brown, 1.2–1.3 mm (0.047–0.051 in) long.

== Taxonomy ==
Ptilotus decalvatus was first formally described in 1979 by Gerhard Benl in the journal Nuytsia from specimens collected on Byam Martin Island in the Bonaparte Archipelago in 1973. The specific epithet (decalvatus) means 'become bald', referring to the tepals that soon become glabrous.

== Distribution and habitat ==
Ptilotus decalvatus grows on sandy soil in gullies in the Dampierland and Northern Kimberley bioregions of far northern Western Australia.

== Conservation status ==
This species of Ptilotus is listed as "not threatened" by the Government of Western Australia Department of Biodiversity, Conservation and Attractions.

== See also ==
- List of Ptilotus species
