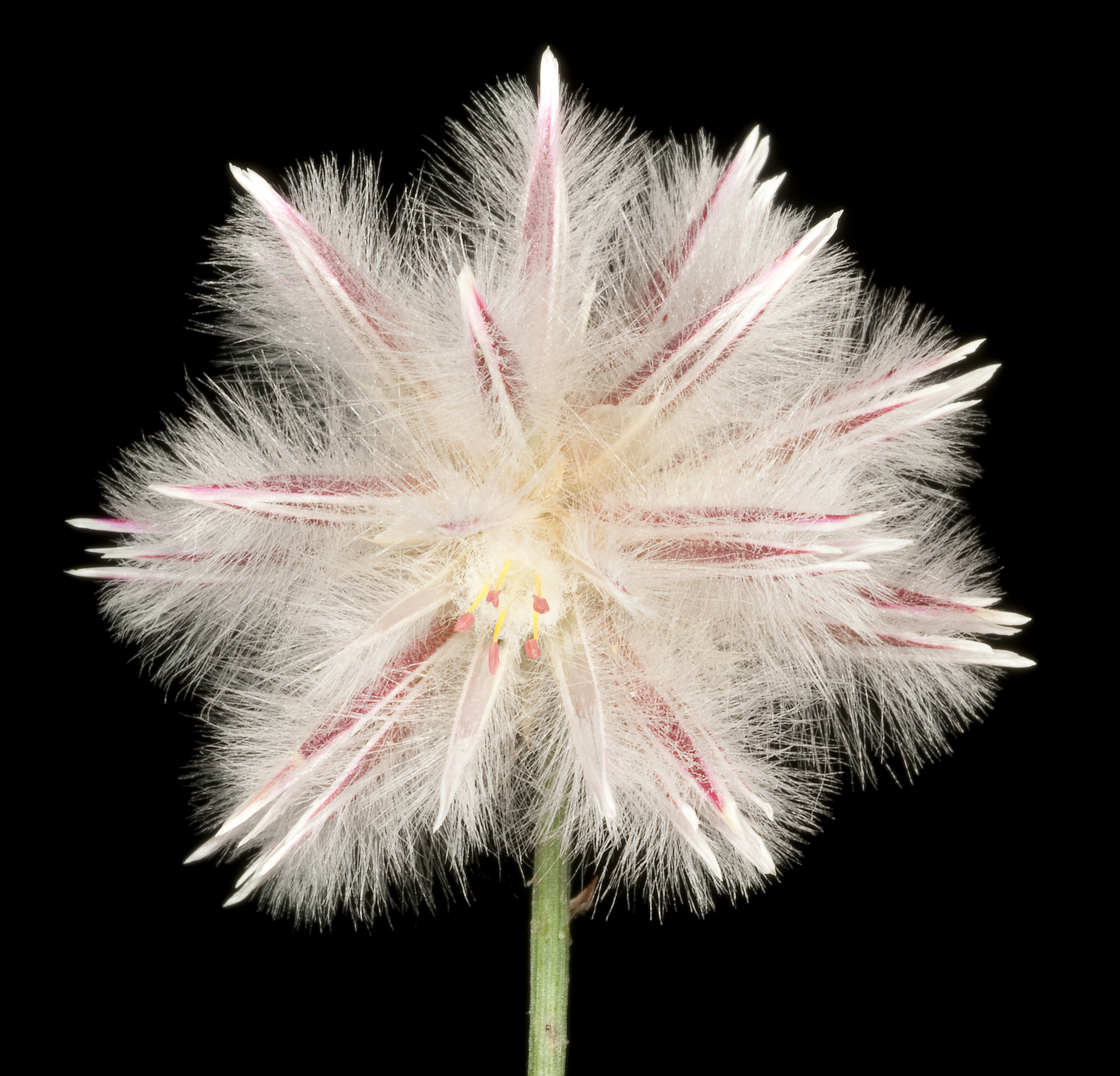

Scientific classification
- Kingdom: Plantae
- Clade: Tracheophytes
- Clade: Angiosperms
- Clade: Eudicots
- Order: Caryophyllales
- Family: Amaranthaceae
- Genus: Ptilotus
- Species: P. esquamatus

Binomial name
- Ptilotus esquamatus (Benth.) F.Muell.

Synonyms
- Trichinium esquamatum Benth.

= Ptilotus esquamatus =

Species of grass-like plant

Ptilotus esquamatus is a species of flowering plant in the family Amaranthaceae and is endemic to the south-west of Western Australia. It is a perennial herb with stems becoming glabrous, hairy leaves, and pink and magenta, oval or spherical spikes of flowers.

== Description ==
Ptilotus esquamatus is a perennial herb with several more or less prostrate stems that become glabrous. The leaves at the base of the plant and on the stems are 5–45 mm (0.20–1.77 in) long and 1–4 mm (0.039–0.157 in) wide, hairy at first, but become glabrous. The flowers are borne in pink or magenta, oval or spherical spikes with densely arranged flowers. There are hairy, coloured bracts about 6.6–7 mm (0.26–0.28 in) long and bracteoles 6.5–7.0 mm (0.26–0.28 in) long with a prominent midrib. The outer tepals are 9–12.5 mm (0.35–0.49 in) long and the inner tepals 7.5–12 mm (0.30–0.47 in) with a tuft of hairs on the inner surface. The style is 3.7–3.9 mm (0.15–0.15 in) long and curved or straight, sometimes fixed to the side of the ovary. Flowering occurs from November to December or January, and the seed is orange or pale brown.

== Taxonomy ==
This species was first formally described in 1870 by George Bentham who gave it the name Trichinium esquamatum in his Flora Australiensis from specimens collected by James Drummond. In 1882, Ferdinand von Mueller transferred the species to Ptilotus as P. esquamatus in his Systematic Census of Australian Plants. The specific epithet (esquamatus) means 'without scales', referring to the lobes on the stamen cups.

== Distribution and habitat ==
This species of Ptilotus grows in sandy clay near Perth and Mandurah in the Jarrah Forest and Swan Coastal Plain bioregions of south-western Western Australia.

== Conservation status ==
Ptilotus eriotrichus is listed as "not threatened" by the Government of Western Australia Department of Biodiversity, Conservation and Attractions.

== See also ==
- List of Ptilotus species
