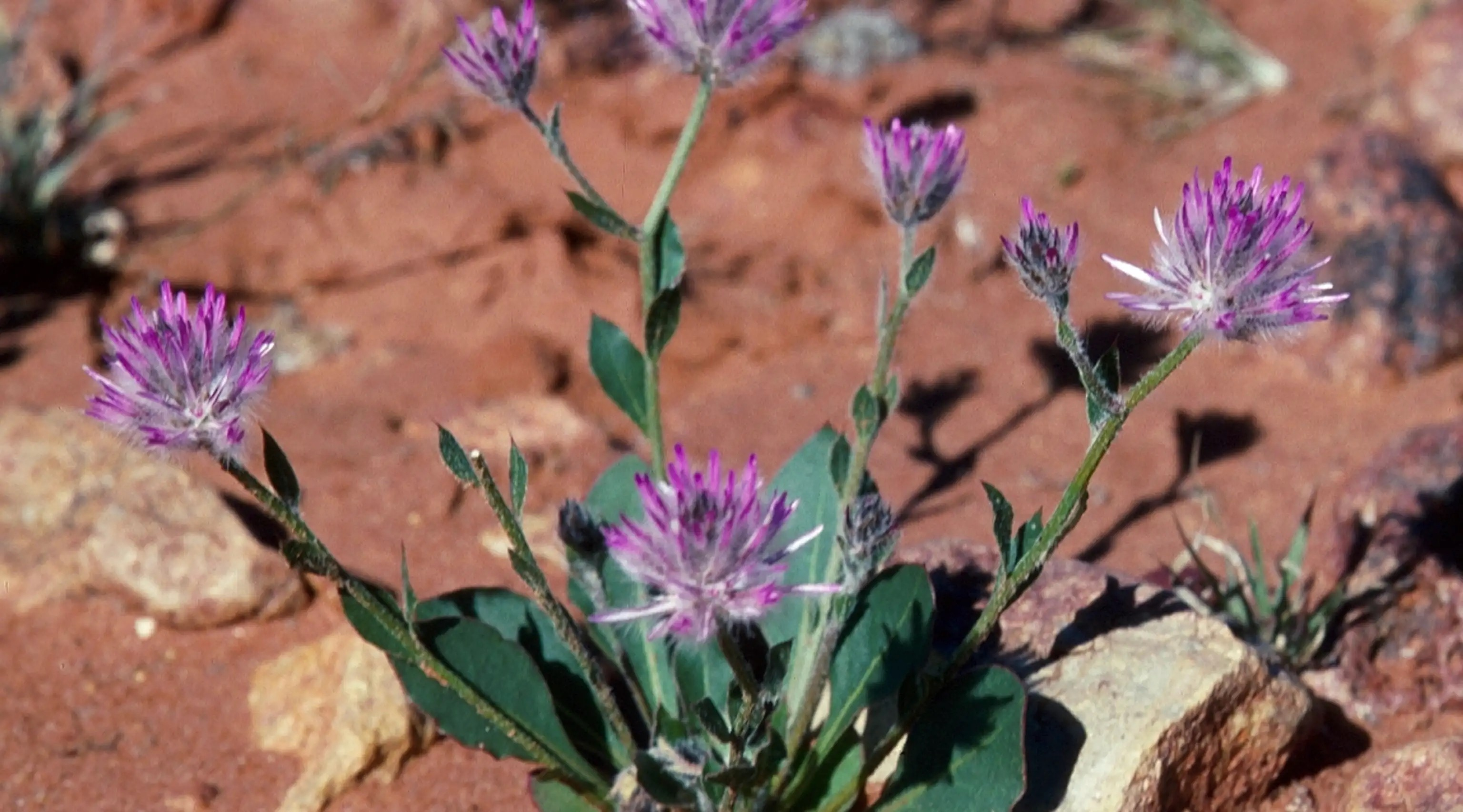
- Subspecies aristatus

Scientific classification
- Kingdom: Plantae
- Clade: Embryophytes
- Clade: Tracheophytes
- Clade: Spermatophytes
- Clade: Angiosperms
- Clade: Eudicots
- Order: Caryophyllales
- Family: Amaranthaceae
- Genus: Ptilotus
- Species: P. aristatus

Binomial name
- Ptilotus aristatus Benl

= Ptilotus aristatus =

Species of grass-like plant

Ptilotus aristatus, commonly known as pink pussy-tail, is a species of flowering plant in the family Amaranthaceae and is endemic to Central Australia. It is an annual or perennial herb with sessile, spatula-shaped or egg-shaped leaves at the base of the plant, and egg-shaped, narrowly egg-shaped or elliptic stem leaves and spikes of pink to pinkish-purple flowers.

== Description ==
Ptilotus aristatus is an annual or perennial herb that typically grows up to 40 cm (16 in) high. The leaves at the base of the plant are sessile, hairy, spatula-shaped or egg-shaped with the narrower end towards the base, 12–110 mm (0.47–4.33 in) long, 3–30 mm (0.12–1.18 in) wide. The leaves on the stems are egg-shaped, narrowly egg-shaped or elliptic, 7–52 mm (0.28–2.05 in) long and 1.3–16 mm (0.051–0.630 in) wide. The flowers are borne in mostly hemispherical or oval spikes 12–60 mm (0.47–2.36 in) long and 9–35 mm (0.35–1.38 in) wide of up to 80 flowers. There are hairy bracts 3.5–8.5 mm (0.14–0.33 in) long and hairy bracteoles mostly 4–8 mm (0.16–0.31 in) long with a brown midrib. The tepals are pink to pinkish-purple, the outer tepals 0.5–2.3 mm (0.020–0.091 in) longer than the inner tepals. There are usually two fertile stamens and three staminodes, the ovary is hairy and the style is 1.6–4.0 mm (0.063–0.157 in) long. Flowering occurs in most months, in response to adequate rainfall.

== Taxonomy ==
Ptilotus aristatus was first formally described in 1961 by Gerhard Benl in the journal Mitteilungen der Botanischen Staatssammlung Munchen from specimens collected near Charlotte Waters in 1939. The specific epithet (aristatus) means 'aristate'.

Two subspecies of Ptilotus aristatus have been described in 2010 in the Journal of the Adelaide Botanic Gardens, and the names are accepted by the Australian Plant Census:

- Ptilotus aristatus Benl subsp. aristatus has a perianth more than 10 mm (0.39 in) long, bracts and bracteoles 5–8.5 mm (0.20–0.33 in) and a style 3–4 mm (0.12–0.16 in) long.
- Ptilotus aristatus subsp. micranthus Albr. & Lally has a perianth 7.5–10 mm (0.30–0.39 in) long, bracts and bracteoles 3.5–5.0 mm (0.14–0.20 in) and a style 1.6–2.2 mm (0.063–0.087 in) long.

== Distribution and habitat ==
Ptilotus aristatus subsp. aristatus occurs in the Northern Territory near the South Australian border and as far south as the Evelyn Downs station, where it grows in open vegetation on gibber plains and slopes, sometimes on nearby floodouts. Subspecies micranthus is restricted to a relatively small area of the Northern Territory in the Burt Plain bioregion, about 100 km (62 mi) west-north-west of Alice Springs, where it grows on cracking clay plain.

== See also ==
- List of Ptilotus species
