= Ptilotus lazaridis =

Conservation status
- Priority Three — Poorly Known Taxa (DEC)

Scientific classification
- Kingdom: Plantae
- Clade: Tracheophytes
- Clade: Angiosperms
- Clade: Eudicots
- Order: Caryophyllales
- Family: Amaranthaceae
- Genus: Ptilotus
- Species: P. lazaridis

Binomial name
- Ptilotus lazaridis Benl

Species of herb

Ptilotus lazaridis is a species of flowering plant in the family Amaranthaceae and is endemic to northern inland Western Australia. It is a perennial herb or shrub with linear to lance-shaped stem leaves, and hemispherical spikes of pink or magenta flowers.

== Description ==
Ptilotus lazaridis is a perennial herb or shrub that typically grows to a height of up to 60 cm (24 in) and has several more or less erect, glabrous stems. Its stem leaves are linear to lance-shaped, 3–20 mm (0.12–0.79 in) long and 0.5–3 mm (0.020–0.118 in) wide. There are no leaves at the base of the plant. The flowers are densely arranged in a hemispherical spike with pink or magenta flowers. There are colourless bracts 3.0–3.5 mm (0.12–0.14 in) long with a prominent midrib and coloured bracteoles mostly 4.0–4.5 mm (0.16–0.18 in) long with a prominent midrib. The outer tepals are 12–15 mm (0.47–0.59 in) long and the inner tepals 11.5–14.5 mm (0.45–0.57 in) long. The style is 8.5–9.2 mm (0.33–0.36 in) long and fixed to the side of the ovary.

== Taxonomy ==
Ptilotus lazaridis was first formally described in 1961 by Gerard Benl in the journal Mitteilungen der Botanischen Staatssammlung Munchen from specimens collected on Beringarra Station in 1956. The specific epithet (lazaridis) honours Michael Lazarides, head of the plant taxonomy unit at CSIRO.

== Distribution ==
This species of Ptilotus grows in clay loam on flodplains in the Gascoyne and Murchison bioregions of inland north-western Western Australia.

== Conservation status ==
Ptilotus lazaridis is listed as "Priority Three" by the Government of Western Australia Department of Biodiversity, Conservation and Attractions, meaning that it is poorly known and known from only a few locations but is not under imminent threat.

== See also ==
- List of Ptilotus species
