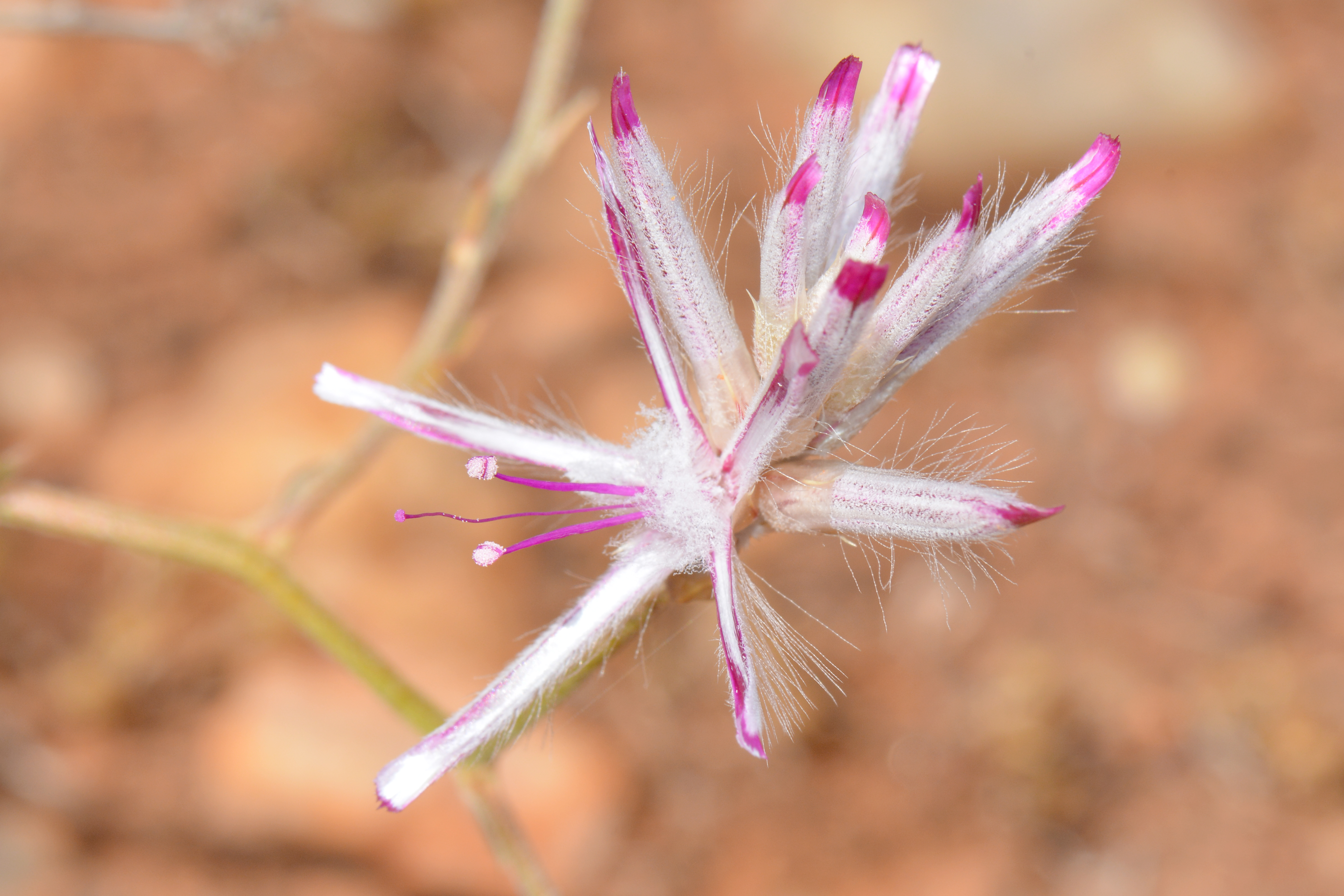
- Near Cue

Scientific classification
- Kingdom: Plantae
- Clade: Tracheophytes
- Clade: Angiosperms
- Clade: Eudicots
- Order: Caryophyllales
- Family: Amaranthaceae
- Genus: Ptilotus
- Species: P. beardii

Binomial name
- Ptilotus beardii Benl

= Ptilotus beardii =

Species of grass-like plant

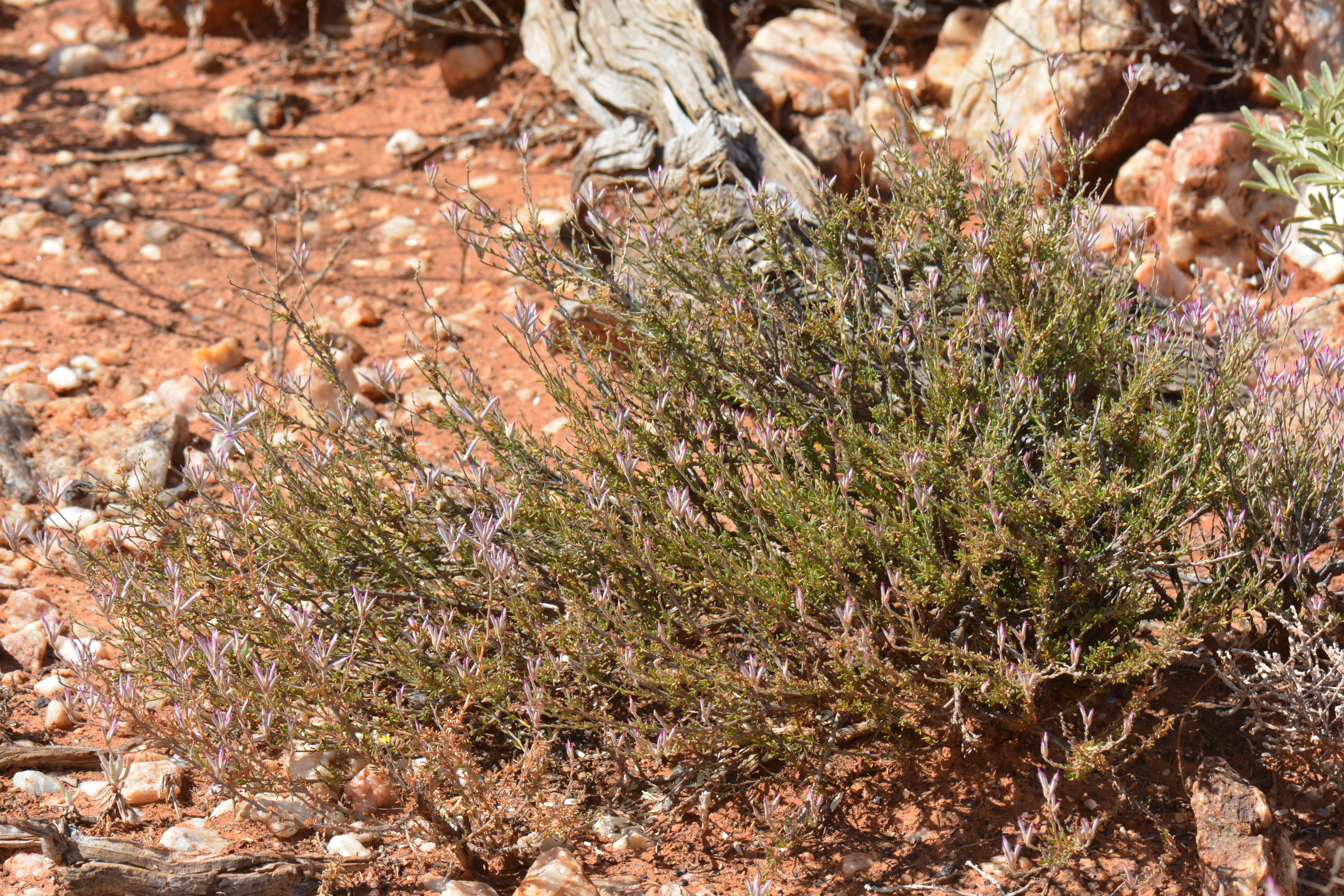
Habit

Ptilotus beardii, commonly known as low mulla mulla, is a species of flowering plant in the family Amaranthaceae and is endemic to Western Australia. It is a compact, rigid, perennial shrub with many branches, linear leaves, and spikes of pink flowers.

== Description ==
Ptilotus beardii is a compact, rigid, perennial shrub or subshrub that typically grows up to 15–50 cm (5.9–19.7 in) high and has many branches. Its leaves are linear, 2–10 mm (0.079–0.394 in) long and 0.5–3 mm (0.020–0.118 in) wide. The flowers are borne in hemispherical spikes 15–30 mm (0.59–1.18 in) long and 20–40 mm (0.79–1.57 in) wide with five to eight pink flowers. There are hairy bracts 3.7–4.2 mm (0.15–0.17 in) long and bracteoles 5.5–6.5 mm (0.22–0.26 in) long with a prominent midrib. The outer tepals are 15.2–16.8 mm (0.60–0.66 in) long, the inner tepals 13.2–15.8 mm (0.52–0.62 in) long with a tuft of hairs. There are two fertile stamens and three staminode, the ovary is glabrous and the style is 9.9–11.1 mm (0.39–0.44 in) long. Flowering occurs from August and October.

== Taxonomy ==
Ptilotus beardii was first formally described in 1989 by Gerhard Benl in the journal Nuytsia from specimens collected by John Stanley Beard in 1973. The specific epithet (beardii) honours the collector of the type specimens.

== Distribution and habitat ==
This species of Ptilotus grows in clay soils on saline flats and low breakaways in the Murchison and Yalgoo bioregions of Western Australia.

== See also ==
- List of Ptilotus species
