= Ptilotus andersonii =

Conservation status
- Priority One — Poorly Known Taxa (DEC)

Scientific classification
- Kingdom: Plantae
- Clade: Tracheophytes
- Clade: Angiosperms
- Clade: Eudicots
- Order: Caryophyllales
- Family: Amaranthaceae
- Genus: Ptilotus
- Species: P. andersonii

Binomial name
- Ptilotus andersonii R.W.Davis

Species of grass-like plant

Ptilotus andersonii is a species of flowering plant in the family Amaranthaceae and is endemic to a restricted area of Western Australia. It is a prostrate, hairy, perennial herb with a spatula-shaped to lance-shaped leaves at the base of the plant, lance-shaped cauline leaves, and pink, oval spikes of flowers with two fertile stamens.

== Description ==
Ptilotus andersonii is a prostrate hairy, perennial herb that typically grows up to 5 cm (2.0 in) high. Leaves at the base of the plant are spatula-shaped to lance-shaped with the narrower end towards the base, 30–45 mm (1.2–1.8 in) long and 3–10 mm (0.12–0.39 in) wide. Cauline leaves are arranged alternately, flat, lance-shaped to egg-shaped with the narrower end towards the base. The flowers are pink, borne in oval heads or loose panicles 10–20 mm (0.39–0.79 in) long and 15–23 mm (0.59–0.91 in) wide on the end of the stems. There are brown, lance-shaped to narrowly egg-shaped, bracts 6–7 mm (0.24–0.28 in) long and broadly egg-shaped bracteoles 5.8–6.3 mm (0.23–0.25 in) long at the base of the flowers. The tepals are green with pink tips, narrowly lance-shaped, the outer tepals 8–10 mm (0.31–0.39 in) long, the inner tepals 7–9.5 mm (0.28–0.37 in) long. There are two fertile stamens 3.5–4.2 mm (0.14–0.17 in) long and three staminodes less than 0.5 mm (0.020 in) long. Flowering has been observed in September.

== Taxonomy ==
Ptilotus andersonii was first formally described in 2015 by Robert Davis in the journal Nuytsia from specimens collected on Burnerbinmah Station in 1996. The specific epithet (andersonii) honours Don Anderson, the owner, later caretaker of Burnerbinmah Station who collected the type specimen.

== Distribution and habitat ==
Ptilotus andersonii is only known from the type specimen, in the Yalgoo bioregion of Western Australia, where it grows in open woodland on loamy soils.

== Conservation status ==
This species of Ptilotus is listed as "Priority One" by the Government of Western Australia Department of Biodiversity, Conservation and Attractions, meaning that it is known from only one or a few locations where it is potentially at risk.

== See also ==
- List of Ptilotus species
