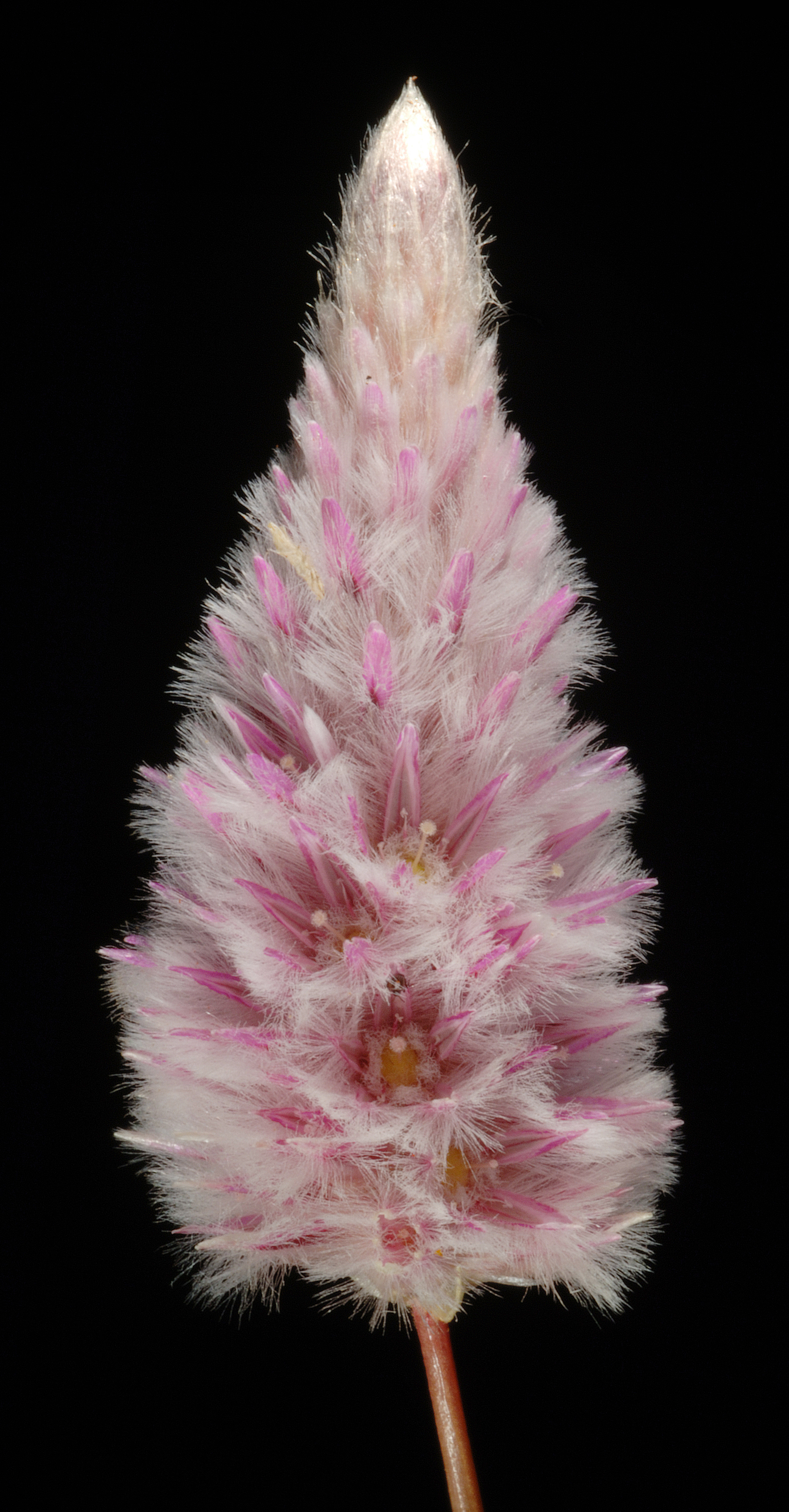

Scientific classification
- Kingdom: Plantae
- Clade: Tracheophytes
- Clade: Angiosperms
- Clade: Eudicots
- Order: Caryophyllales
- Family: Amaranthaceae
- Genus: Ptilotus
- Species: P. calostachyus

Binomial name
- Ptilotus calostachyus F.Muell.

Synonyms
- Arthrotrichum calostachyum F.Muell. nom. inval., nom. prov.; Arthrotrichum calostachyum F.Muell. nom. inval., nom. prov.; Ptilotus calostachyus F.Muell. var. calostachyus; Ptilotus calostachyus var. procerus (Diels) Benl; Trichinium calostachyum (F.Muell.) F.Muell. ex Benth.; Trichinium procerum Diels

= Ptilotus calostachyus =

Species of grass-like plant

Ptilotus calostachyus, commonly known as weeping mulla mulla, is a species of flowering plant in the family Amaranthaceae and is endemic to northern Australia. It is an erect, spreading perennial herb or shrub with stem leaves and spikes of pinkish-white flowers.

== Description ==
Ptilotus calostachyus is an erect, spreading perennial herb or shrub that typically grows to 0.2–2 m (7.9 in – 6 ft 6.7 in) high. There are no leaves at the base of the plant, but the stems have leaves arranged alternately, 10–90 mm (0.39–3.54 in) long and 1–3 mm (0.039–0.118 in) wide. The flowers are pinkish-white and densely arranged in cylindrical spikes. The bracts are mostly 1.7–3.2 mm (0.067–0.126 in) long and the bracteoles are 2–3 mm (0.079–0.118 in) long, colourless and sometimes hairy. The outer tepals are 3.3–6 mm (0.13–0.24 in) long and the inner tepals are 3.3–5.8 mm (0.13–0.23 in) long. The style is 1.4–2.5 mm (0.055–0.098 in) long. Flowering occurs from March to October.

== Taxonomy ==
Ptilotus calostachyus was first formally described in 1868 by Ferdinand von Mueller in his Fragmenta Phytographiae Australiae. The specific epithet (calostachyus) means 'beautiful flower spike'.

== Distribution ==
This species of Ptilotus grows on sandy or stony plains and ridges in the northern half of Western Australia, the Northern Territory and in two locations north of Camooweal in Queensland, but close to the Northern Territory border.

== Conservation status ==
This species of Ptilotus is listed as "not threatened" by the Government of Western Australia Department of Biodiversity, Conservation and Attractions, and as of "least concern" under the Northern Territory Territory Parks and Wildlife Conservation Act and the Queensland Government Nature Conservation Act 1992.

== Gallery ==
Ptilotus calostachyus

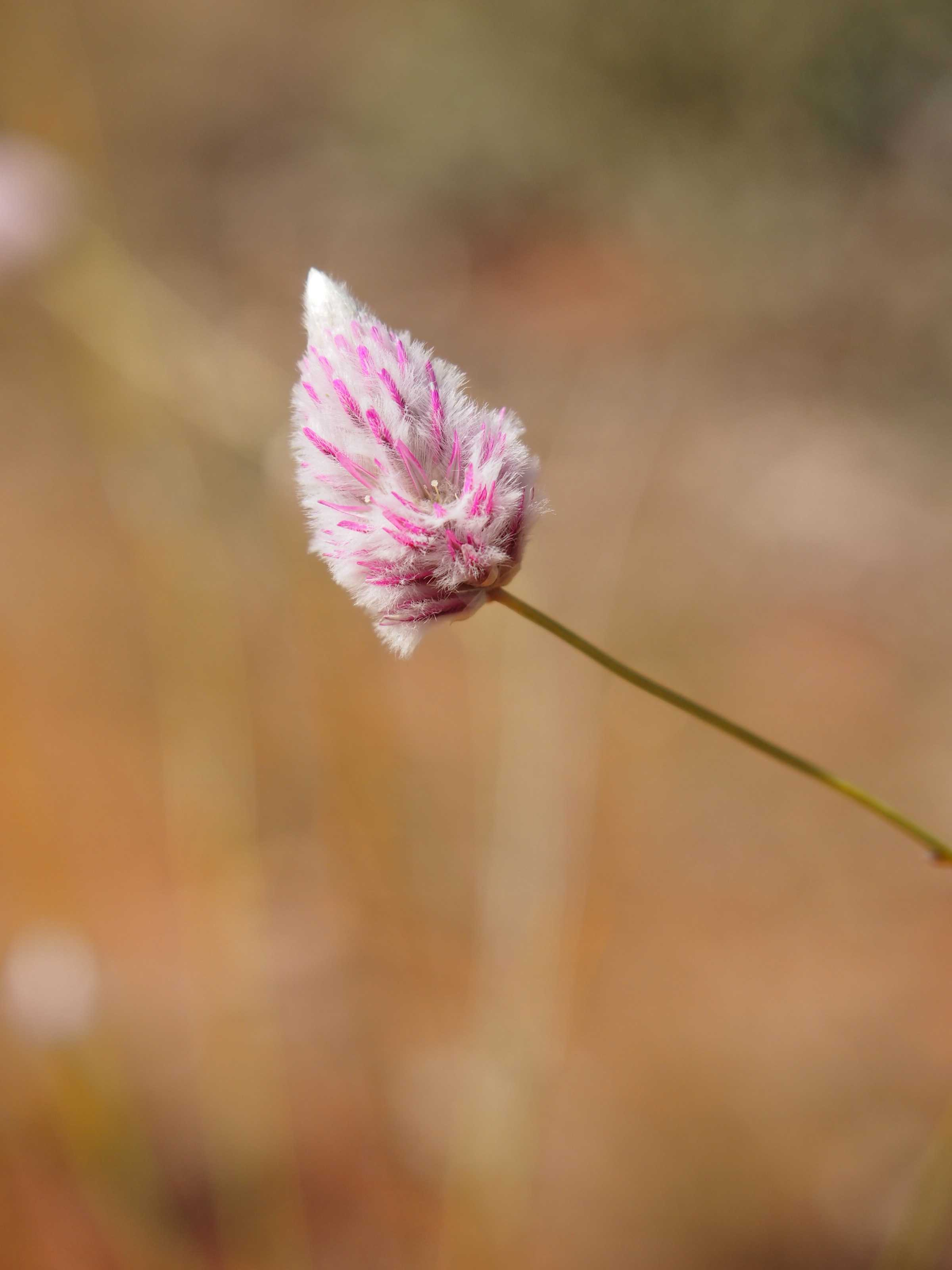

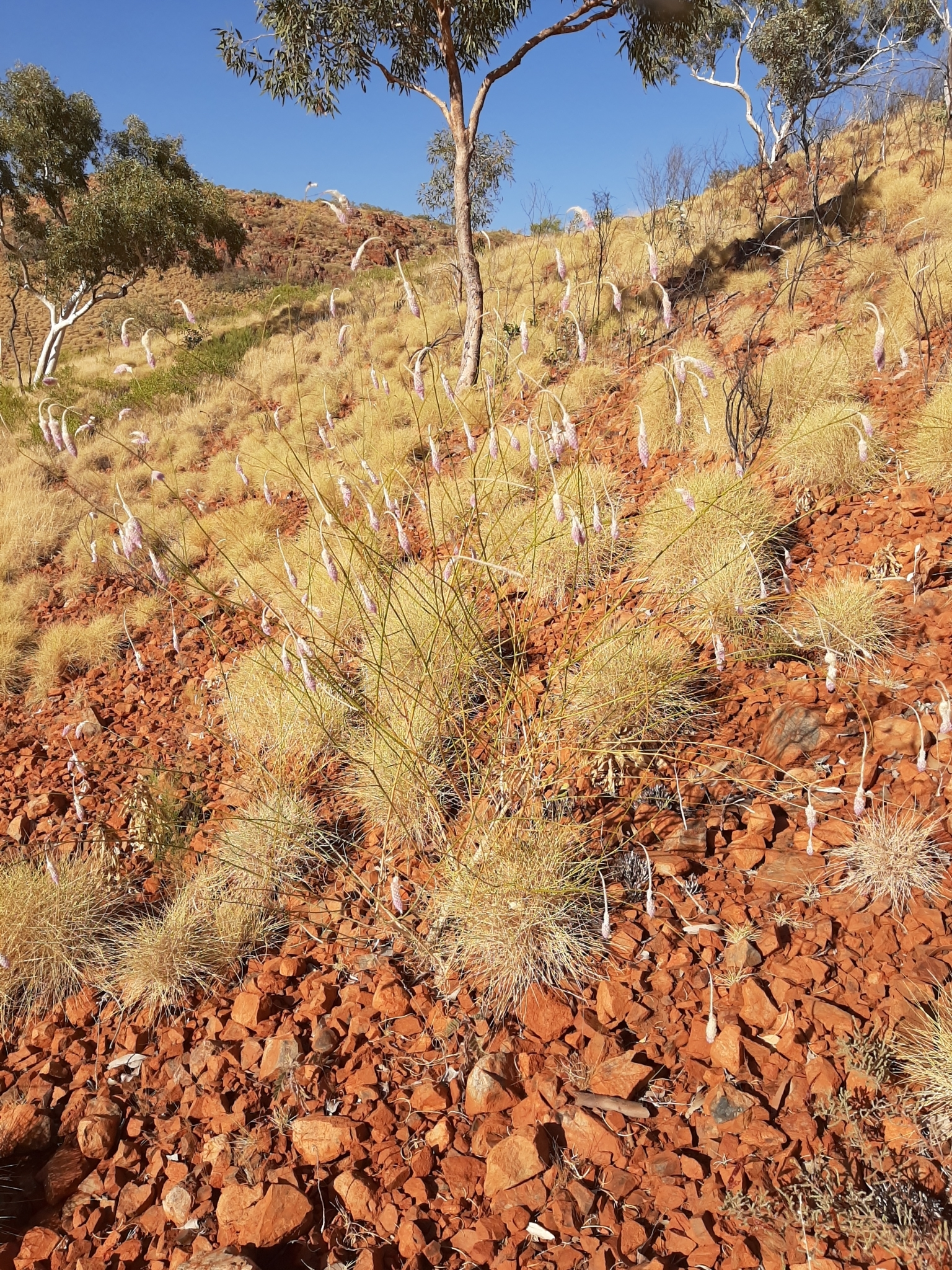

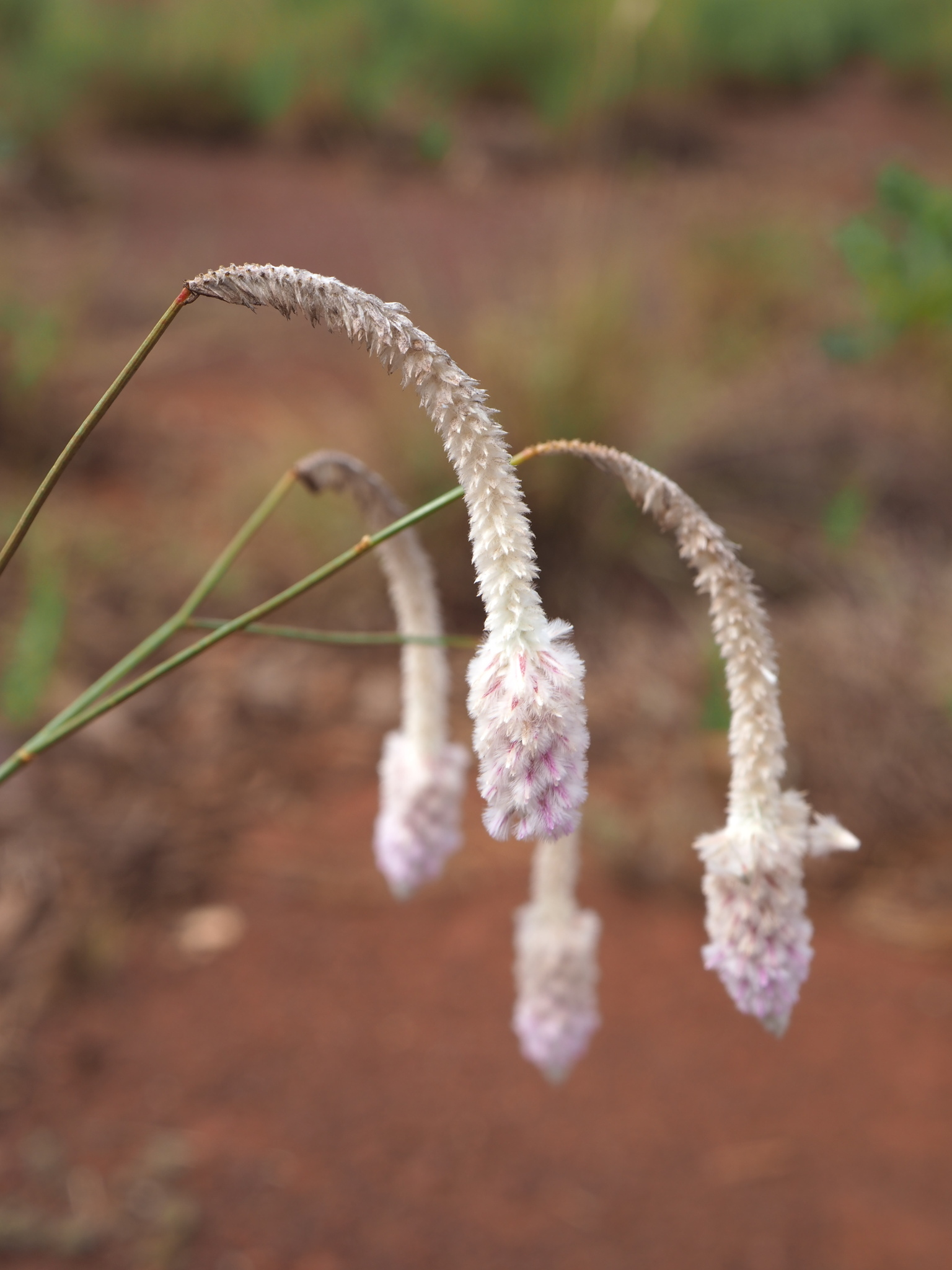

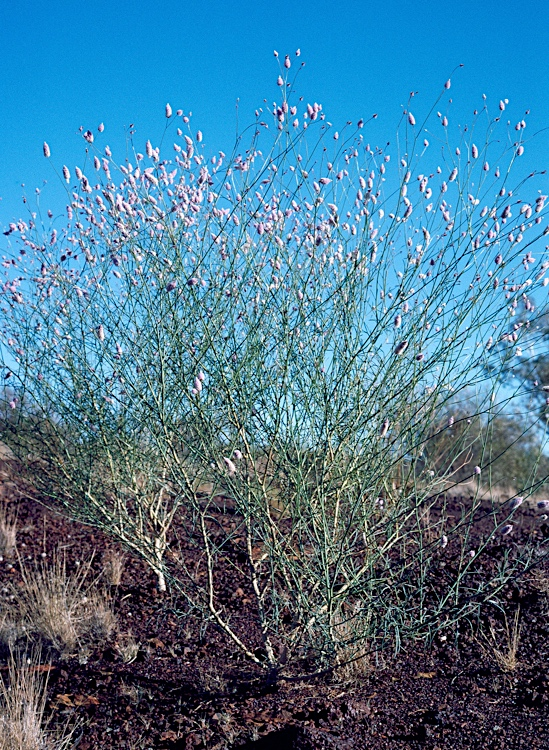

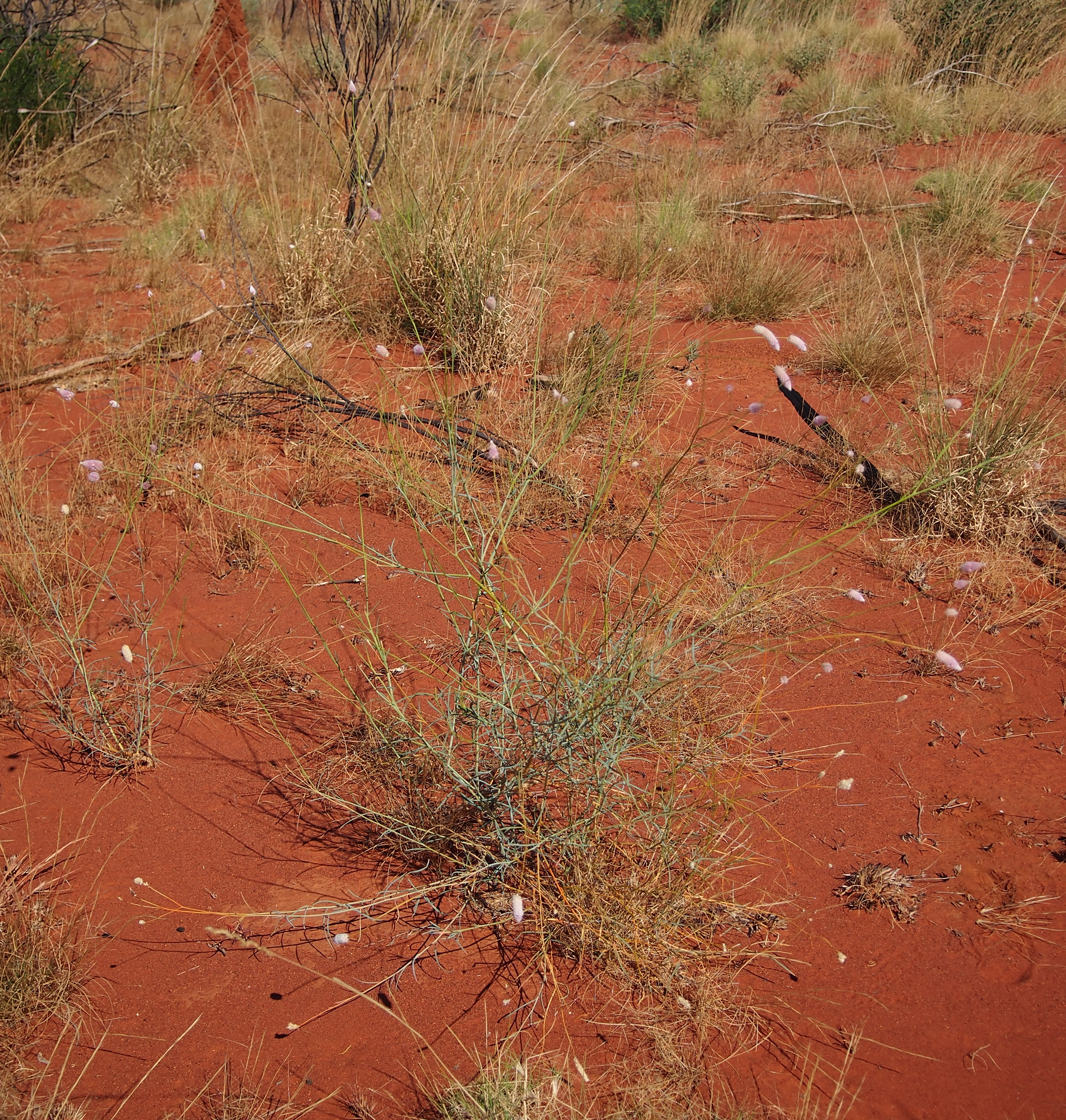

== See also ==
- List of Ptilotus species
