= Ptilotus caespitulosus =

Conservation status
- Declared Rare — Presumed Extinct (DEC)

Scientific classification
- Kingdom: Plantae
- Clade: Tracheophytes
- Clade: Angiosperms
- Clade: Eudicots
- Order: Caryophyllales
- Family: Amaranthaceae
- Genus: Ptilotus
- Species: P. caespitulosus

Binomial name
- Ptilotus caespitulosus F.Muell.

Synonyms
- Trichinium caespitulosum (F.Muell.) F.Muell. ex Benth.

Species of grass-like plant

Ptilotus caespitulosus, commonly known as salt lake mulla-mulla, was a species of flowering plant in the family Amaranthaceae and was endemic to Western Australia. It was a prostrate perennial herb with spikes of pink flowers. It was first formally described in 1868 by Ferdinand von Mueller in his Fragmenta Phytographiae Australiae from specimens collected by James Drummond. The specific epithet (caespitulosus) means 'many small tufts', referring to the lower leaves.

This species of Ptilotus grew around salt lakes. It is listed as "presumed extinct" by the Government of Western Australia Department of Biodiversity, Conservation and Attractions.

== See also ==
- List of Ptilotus species
