= Ptilotus exiliflorus =

Scientific classification
- Kingdom: Plantae
- Clade: Tracheophytes
- Clade: Angiosperms
- Clade: Eudicots
- Order: Caryophyllales
- Family: Amaranthaceae
- Genus: Ptilotus
- Species: P. exiliflorus

Binomial name
- Ptilotus exiliflorus R.W.Davis

Synonyms
- Ptilotus humilis var. parviflora Benth. orth. var.; Ptilotus humilis var. parviflorus Benth.; Ptilotus humilis var. parviflorus Benl manuscript name; Ptilotus parviflorus (Benth.) R.W.Davis nom. illeg.

Species of grass-like plant

Ptilotus exiliflorus is a species of flowering plant in the family Amaranthaceae and is endemic to the west of Western Australia. It is an annual plant with several more or less prostrate stems becoming glabrous as they age, hairy leaves, and green or white, oval or cylindrical spikes of flowers.

== Description ==
Ptilotus exiliflorus is an annual plant with several more or less prostrate stems that become glabrous as they age. The leaves at the base of the plant and on the stems are 5–40 mm (0.20–1.57 in) long and 1–3 mm (0.039–0.118 in) wide, hairy at first, but become glabrous. The flowers are borne in green or white, oval or cylindrical spikes with densely arranged flowers. There are hairy, colourless bracts 3.5–4.0 mm (0.14–0.16 in) long and bracteoles 3.5–3.9 mm (0.14–0.15 in) long with an obscure midrib. The tepals are mostly 4.0–4.5 mm (0.16–0.18 in) long, the inner tepals with a tuft of hairs on the inner surface. The style is 0.7–0.9 mm (0.028–0.035 in) long, straight and centrally fixed to the ovary. The seed is dull brown and 0.7–0.9 mm (0.028–0.035 in) long.

== Taxonomy ==
In 1870, George Bentham described Ptilotus humilis var. parviflorus in his Flora Australiensis. In 2012, Robert Wayne Davis raised the variety to species status as Ptilotus parviflorus but that name was illegitimate because the name is preoccupied by Ptilotus parviflorus (Lindl.) F.Muell. Davis raised the new name P. exiliflorus R.W.Davis for the species. The specific epithet (exiliflorus) means 'slender flowered', referring to its narrower flowers compared to the similar P. humilis.

== Distribution ==
This species of Ptilotus grows in the Coolgardie, Geraldton Sandplains, Murchison and Yalgoo bioregions of western Western Australia.

== Conservation status ==
Ptilotus exiliflorus is listed as "not threatened" by the Government of Western Australia Department of Biodiversity, Conservation and Attractions.

== See also ==
- List of Ptilotus species
