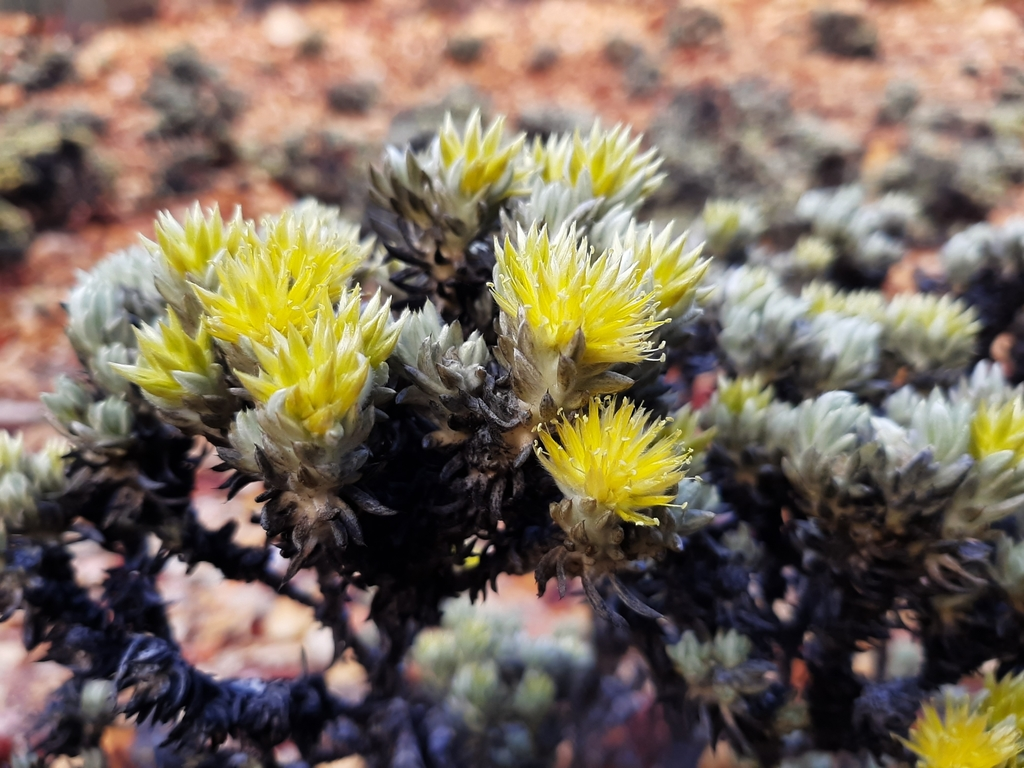

Scientific classification
- Kingdom: Plantae
- Clade: Tracheophytes
- Clade: Angiosperms
- Clade: Eudicots
- Order: Caryophyllales
- Family: Amaranthaceae
- Genus: Ptilotus
- Species: P. helichrysoides

Binomial name
- Ptilotus helichrysoides (F.Muell.) F.Muell.

Synonyms
- Psilotrichum helichrysoides F.Muell.; Trichinium helichrysoides (F.Muell.) Benth.

= Ptilotus helichrysoides =

Species of grass-like plant

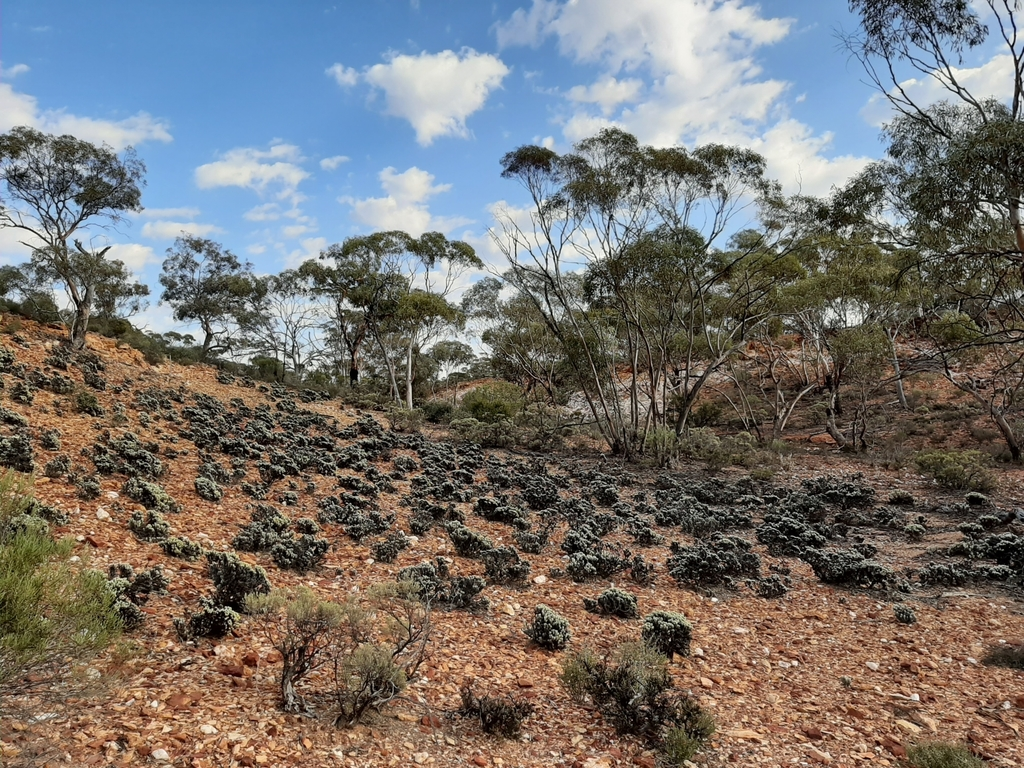
Habitat

Ptilotus helichrysoides is a species of flowering plant in the family Amaranthaceae and is endemic to Western Australia. It is an erect, compact shrub with stem leaves arranged alternately and yellow flowers arranged singly or in oval to spherical spikes.

== Description ==
Ptilotus helichrysoides is an erect, compact shrub, that typically grows to a height of up to 10–50 cm (3.9–19.7 in), its stems single and sometimes hairy or glabrous. The leaves on the stems are arranged alternately, 5–26 mm (0.20–1.02 in) long and 2–8 mm (0.079–0.315 in) wide. There are no leaves at the base of the plant. The flowers are yellow and arranged singly or in oval, hemispherical or spherical spikes, with hairy, colourless bracts 3.2–3.7 mm (0.13–0.15 in) long, and similar bracteoles 4.2–4.5 mm (0.17–0.18 in) long. The outer tepals are 6–7.7 mm (0.24–0.30 in) long and the inner tepals 5.5–7.3 mm (0.22–0.29 in) long. The style is straight, 4.1–4.7 mm (0.16–0.19 in) long and more or less fixed to the centre of the ovary. Flowering occurs from July to November.

== Taxonomy ==
This species was first formally described in 1859 by Ferdinand von Mueller who gave it the name Psilotrichum helichrysoides in his Fragmenta Phytographiae Australiae. In 1868, von Mueller transferred the species to Ptilotus as P. helichrysoides in a later volume of Fragmenta Phytographiae Australiae. The specific epithet (helichrysoides) means 'Helichrysum-like'.

== Distribution and habitat ==
This species of Ptilotus on rocky hillslopes and outcrops in the Avon Wheatbelt, Coolgardie, Geraldton Sandplains, Great Victoria Desert Murchison and Yalgoo bioregions of Western Australia.

== Conservation status ==
Ptilotus helichrysoides is listed as "not threatened" by the Government of Western Australia Department of Biodiversity, Conservation and Attractions.

== See also ==
- List of Ptilotus species
