= Ptilotus disparilis =

Scientific classification
- Kingdom: Plantae
- Clade: Tracheophytes
- Clade: Angiosperms
- Clade: Eudicots
- Order: Caryophyllales
- Family: Amaranthaceae
- Genus: Ptilotus
- Species: P. disparilis

Binomial name
- Ptilotus disparilis Lally

Species of grass-like plant

Ptilotus disparilis, commonly known as shrubby fox-tail, is a species of flowering plant in the family Amaranthaceae and is endemic to South Australia. It is a widely spreading, spiny shrub with egg-shaped, elliptic leaves and spikes of five to eight pinkish-purple flowers.

== Description ==
Ptilotus disparilis is a shrub that typically grows to a height of up to 30 cm (12 in), its young stems hairy at first, later glabrous. The leaves are sessile, elliptic or egg-shaped, sometimes with the narrower end towards the base, 2–5.5 mm (0.079–0.217 in) long and 0.5–1.0 mm (0.020–0.039 in) wide. The flowers are arranged in groups of five to eight on a rachis up to 50 mm (2.0 in) long with bracts 1.0–1.5 mm (0.039–0.059 in) long and bracteoles 2.0–2.5 mm (0.079–0.098 in) long at the base. The perianth is 5.5–6.5 mm (0.22–0.26 in) long and greyish white and pinkish-purple, the outer tepals scarsely longer than the inner tepals. The anthers are 0.7–0.8 mm (0.028–0.031 in) long and the style is 2.2–3.5 mm (0.087–0.138 in) long.

== Taxonomy ==
Ptilotus disparilis was first formally described in 2008 by Terena R. Lally in the Journal of the Adelaide Botanic Gardens from specimens collected 1.4 km (0.87 mi) north of Copley by Robert Chinnock in 2001. The specific epithet (disparilis) refers to the dissimilar flower structure of this species, compared to others in the genus.

== Distribution ==
This species of Ptilotus is found in a small area between Copley and Farina in South Australia, where it grows on rises near saline depressions and near mine tailings.

== See also ==
- List of Ptilotus species
