= Ptilotus propinquus =

Scientific classification
- Kingdom: Plantae
- Clade: Tracheophytes
- Clade: Angiosperms
- Clade: Eudicots
- Order: Caryophyllales
- Family: Amaranthaceae
- Genus: Ptilotus
- Species: P. propinquus

Binomial name
- Ptilotus propinquus Lally

Species of plant

Ptilotus propinquus, commonly known as Gammon Ranges fox-tail, is a species of flowering plant of the family Amaranthaceae and is endemic to inland South Australia. It is a much branched, broadly spreading, spiny shrub, with sessile egg-shaped, more or less fleshy leaves, and pink or purple flowers.

== Description ==
Ptilotus propinquus is a much branched, broadly spreading, rounded, spiny shrub that typically grows to a height of 60 cm (24 in) with striated, glabrous, glaucous younger stems that later turn brown. The leaves are sessile, egg-shaped, sometimes with the narrower end towards the base, 3.5 mm (0.14 in) long, 1 mm (0.039 in) wide, and more or less fleshy, the upper surface glabrous and the lower surface with scattered hairs. There are 10 to 50 pink or purple flowers 11–12.5 mm (0.43–0.49 in) long on a rachis up to 50 mm (2.0 in) long with bracts and bracteoles 4.5–6 mm (0.18–0.24 in) long. The tepals are narrowly oblong, with a keel at the base, the outer tepals hairy and 1 mm (0.039 in) longer than the inner tepals. The stamens are 6–7 mm (0.24–0.28 in) long and there are three staminodes up to 1.5 mm (0.059 in) long. The ovary is hump-backed the style is 5.5–6.5 mm (0.22–0.26 in) long and fixed to the side of the ovary. Flowering occurs mainly from March to July, but has also been recorded in September and November.

== Taxonomy ==
Ptilotus propinquus was first formally described in 2008 by Terena R. Lally in the Journal of the Adelaide Botanic Gardens from specimens collected in Narrina Pound in the Flinders Ranges in 1989. The specific epithet (propinquus) means 'near' or 'related to' referring to "the close relationship of this species to several others in this complex".

== Distribution and habitat ==
Gammon Ranges fox-tail grows in bare, shaly clay soil with species of Casuarina or scattered mallees, and is only known from a small area in the Gammon Ranges in the North Flinders Ranges.
