= Ptilotus unguiculatus =

Conservation status
- Priority One — Poorly Known Taxa (DEC)

Scientific classification
- Kingdom: Plantae
- Clade: Embryophytes
- Clade: Tracheophytes
- Clade: Spermatophytes
- Clade: Angiosperms
- Clade: Eudicots
- Order: Caryophyllales
- Family: Amaranthaceae
- Genus: Ptilotus
- Species: P. unguiculatus

Binomial name
- Ptilotus unguiculatus T.Hammer

Species of plant

Ptilotus unguiculatus is a species of flowering plant of the family Amaranthaceae and is endemic to northern Western Australia. It is a low-lying annual herb with lance-shaped to egg-shaped stem leaves and spikes of flowers arranged singly or in small clusters.

== Description ==
Ptilotus unguiculatus is a low-lying annual herb that typically grows up to 8 cm (3.1 in) tall and 20 cm (7.9 in) wide with terete, ribbed, hairy stems. The stem leaves are arranged alternately, lance-shaped to egg-shaped and glabrous, 8–30 mm (0.31–1.18 in) long and 5–11 mm (0.20–0.43 in) wide on a petiole 5–10 mm (0.20–0.39 in) long. The flowers are borne in a single or two to three conical spikes on the ends of branches, with broadly egg-shaped bracts 1.8–1.9 mm (0.071–0.075 in) long and 1.4–1.5 mm (0.055–0.059 in) wide and similarly shaped bracteoles 3.0–3.1 mm (0.12–0.12 in) long and 2.4–2.5 mm (0.094–0.098 in) wide, both with an obscure midrib. The outer sepals are spoon-shaped with a claw on the end, 3.5–3.6 mm (0.14–0.14 in) long, and 0.4–0.5 mm (0.016–0.020 in) wide at the base, the inner sepals narrowly spoon-shaped, 2.5–3.1 mm (0.098–0.122 in) long, and 0.3–0.4 mm (0.012–0.016 in) wide. There are five stamens, the style is straight, 0.6–0.7 mm (0.024–0.028 in) long and the ovary is spherical, 0.6–0.7 mm (0.024–0.028 in) long and 0.6–0.8 mm (0.024–0.031 in) wide. Flowering has been recorded in early July but the fruit and seeds have not been collected.

== Taxonomy ==
Ptilotus unguiculatus was first formally described in 2018 by Timothy Hammer in the journal Swainsona from specimens collected near Edaggee Station in 1970. The specific epithet (unguiculatus) means 'having claws', referring to the clawed sepals.

== Distribution and habitat ==
This species of Ptilotus is currently only known from near the Edaggee Station, where it was first collected in a disturbed area in the Carnarvon bioregion of northern Western Australia.

== Conservation status ==
Ptilotus unguiculatus is listed as "Priority One" by the Government of Western Australia Department of Biodiversity, Conservation and Attractions, meaning that it is known from only one or a few locations where it is potentially at risk.
