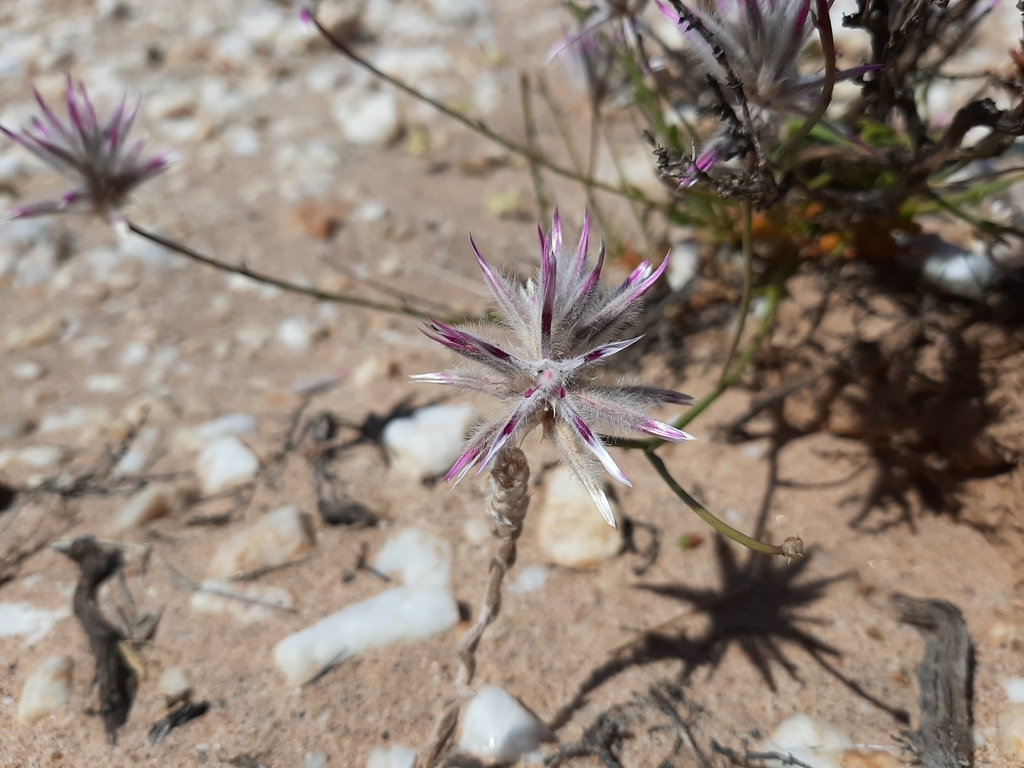

Scientific classification
- Kingdom: Plantae
- Clade: Tracheophytes
- Clade: Angiosperms
- Clade: Eudicots
- Order: Caryophyllales
- Family: Amaranthaceae
- Genus: Ptilotus
- Species: P. rigidus

Binomial name
- Ptilotus rigidus Lally

= Ptilotus rigidus =

Species of plant

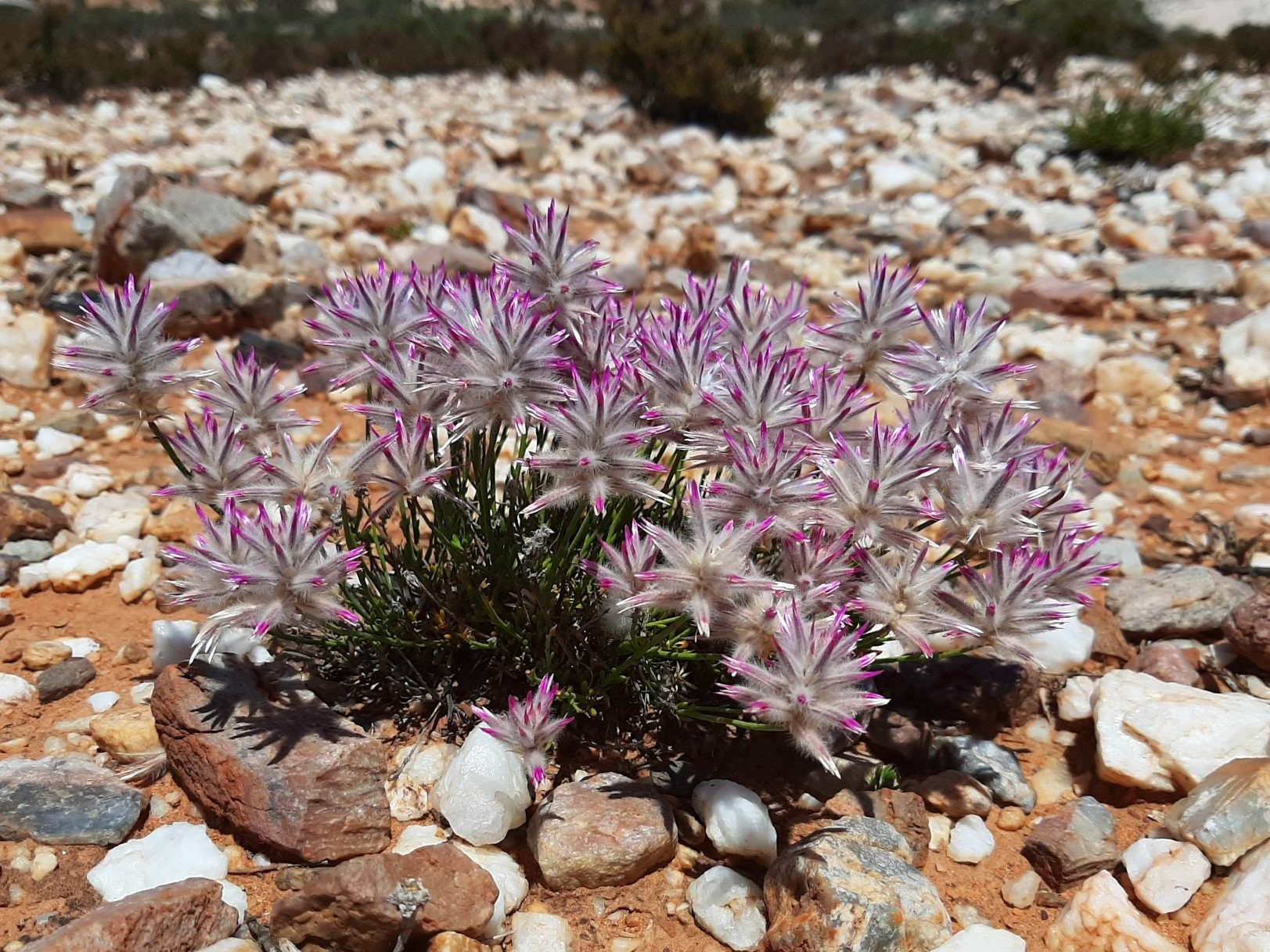
Habit near Kalgoorlie

Ptilotus rigidus is a species of flowering plant of the family Amaranthaceae and is endemic to inland Western Australia. It is a rigid, slightly spiny shrub, with sessile to subsessile narrowly egg-shaped leaves with the narrower end towards the base, and pink or magenta flowers.

== Description ==
Ptilotus rigidus is a rigid, slightly spiny spiny shrub that typically grows to a height of 25 cm (9.8 in) with striated, green new stems. The leaves are sessile to subsessile, narrowly egg-shaped with the narrower end towards the base, 2.5–5.5 mm (0.098–0.217 in) long, 0.5–1.0 mm (0.020–0.039 in) wide, dark green and sparsely hairy at first, later glabrous. There are 20 to 40 pink or magenta flowers on an oblong or hemispherical spike up to 30 mm (1.2 in) long on a rachis up to 20 mm (0.79 in) long with bracts 4.5–5.2 mm (0.18–0.20 in) long and bracteoles 5.5–6.0 mm (0.22–0.24 in) long. The tepals are linear or narrowly oblong, with a thin, very narrow membranous band, and densely hairy on the outer surface. Two fertile stamens are 6–7 mm (0.24–0.28 in) long and there are three staminodes up to 0.6 mm (0.024 in) long. The ovary is hairy, and the style is straight or slightly s-shaped, 7–8 mm (0.28–0.31 in) long and fixed to the side of the ovary.

== Taxonomy ==
Ptilotus rigidus was first formally described in 2009 by Terena R. Lally in the journal Nuytsia from specimens collected by Maisie Carr between Coolgardie and Norseman in 1968. The specific epithet (rigidus) means 'rigid' or 'unbendable', "referring to the stiff, stick-like habit of this species".

== Distribution and habitat ==
This species of Ptilotus is found near Kalgoorie where it grows near salt lakes in the Coolgardie and Murchison bioregions of inland Western Australia.

== Conservation status ==
Ptilotus rigidus is listed as "Priority One" by the Western Australian Government Department of Biodiversity, Conservation and Attractions, meaning it is known from only a few populations that are under immediate threat from known threatening processes.
