= Ptilotus procumbens =

Conservation status
- Priority One — Poorly Known Taxa (DEC)

Scientific classification
- Kingdom: Plantae
- Clade: Tracheophytes
- Clade: Angiosperms
- Clade: Eudicots
- Order: Caryophyllales
- Family: Amaranthaceae
- Genus: Ptilotus
- Species: P. procumbens

Binomial name
- Ptilotus procumbens Benl

Species of plant

Ptilotus procumbens is a species of flowering plant of the family Amaranthaceae and is endemic to inland Western Australia. It is a spreading, low-lying, perennial or annual herb with several more or less prostrate stems, hairy leaves at first, later glabrous, pinkish white flowers and dull brown seeds.

== Description ==
Ptilotus procumbens is a perennial or annual herb with several more or less prostrate stems, that are hairy at first, later glabrous, arising from a central tap root 5 mm (0.20 in) in diameter. There are 10 to 20 spoon shaped leaves 70 mm (2.8 in) long and 7 mm (0.28 in) wide in a rosette at the base of the plant, but that soon wither. There are three to eight lance-shaped to narrowly egg-shaped stem leaves, mostly 13–25 mm (0.51–0.98 in) long and about 2.5–6 mm (0.098–0.236 in) wide on a flattened or winged petiole of variable length. There are 10 to 50 conical spikes of flowers 18 mm (0.71 in) long and 10 mm (0.39 in) wide on the ends of stems and branchlets, each spike with 15 to 45 pinkish white flowers. The bracts and bracteoles are hairy, mostly 3.8–4.3 mm (0.15–0.17 in) long and hairy with an obscure midrib. The outer tepals are 4.0–4.5 mm (0.16–0.18 in) long and the inner tepals 3.8–4.0 mm (0.15–0.16 in) with a tuft of hairs near the base, and the style is 1.0–1.2 mm (0.039–0.047 in) long and fixed to the side of the ovary. Flowering occurs in November, and the seeds are 1.0–1.2 mm (0.039–0.047 in) long and dull brown.

== Taxonomy ==
Ptilotus procumbens was first formally described in 1983 by Gerhard Benl in the journal Nuytsia from specimens collected on the Kambalda road in Boulder in 1978. The specific epithet (procumbens) means 'procumbent'.

== Distribution and habitat ==
This species of Ptilotus grows on red clay in the Coolgardie and Murchison bioregions of inland Western Australia.

== Conservation status ==
Ptilotus procumbens is listed as "Priority One" by the Government of Western Australia Department of Biodiversity, Conservation and Attractions, meaning that it is known from only one or a few locations where it is potentially at risk.
