= Ptilotus robynsianus =

Scientific classification
- Kingdom: Plantae
- Clade: Tracheophytes
- Clade: Angiosperms
- Clade: Eudicots
- Order: Caryophyllales
- Family: Amaranthaceae
- Genus: Ptilotus
- Species: P. robynsianus

Binomial name
- Ptilotus robynsianus Benl

Species of plant

Ptilotus robynsianus, commonly known as Robyns pussy-tail, is a species of flowering plant of the family Amaranthaceae and is endemic to inland Australia. It is sometimes a rounded shrub with egg-shaped or elliptic, densely hairy leaves and pink to purple flowers. It is only known from two collections in the 1950's.

== Description ==
Ptilotus robynsianus is a sometimes rounded shrub that typically grows to a height of up to 20 cm (7.9 in) with stems and leaves densely covered with hairs. The leaves are egg-shaped with the narrower end towards the base or elliptic, 20 mm (0.79 in) long and 5 mm (0.20 in) wide. The flowers are borne in spikes up to 70 mm (2.8 in) long with up to 9 pink to purple flowers on the ends of branches. The bracts are 2.2–3.6 mm (0.087–0.142 in) long, the bracteoles 2.5–3.0 mm (0.098–0.118 in) long. The perianth segments are 4.5–6.5 mm (0.18–0.26 in) long, and there are two or three stamens and three or two staminodes. The style is 2.3–2.6 mm (0.091–0.102 in) long and the ovary is hairy near its top. Flowering occurs in October, and the seeds are borne in white to purplish heads.

== Taxonomy ==
Ptilotus robynsianus was first formally described in 1957 by Gerhard Benl in the journal Bulletin du Jardin Botanique de l'État à Bruxelles from specimens collected in the Flinders Ranges 1953. The specific epithet (robynsianus) honours Frans Hubert Edouard Arthur Walter Robyns.

== Distribution and habitat ==
This species of Ptilotus is only known from two collections in the 1950's, one from the Flinders Ranges in South Australia and the other from Alice Springs in the Northern Territory.
