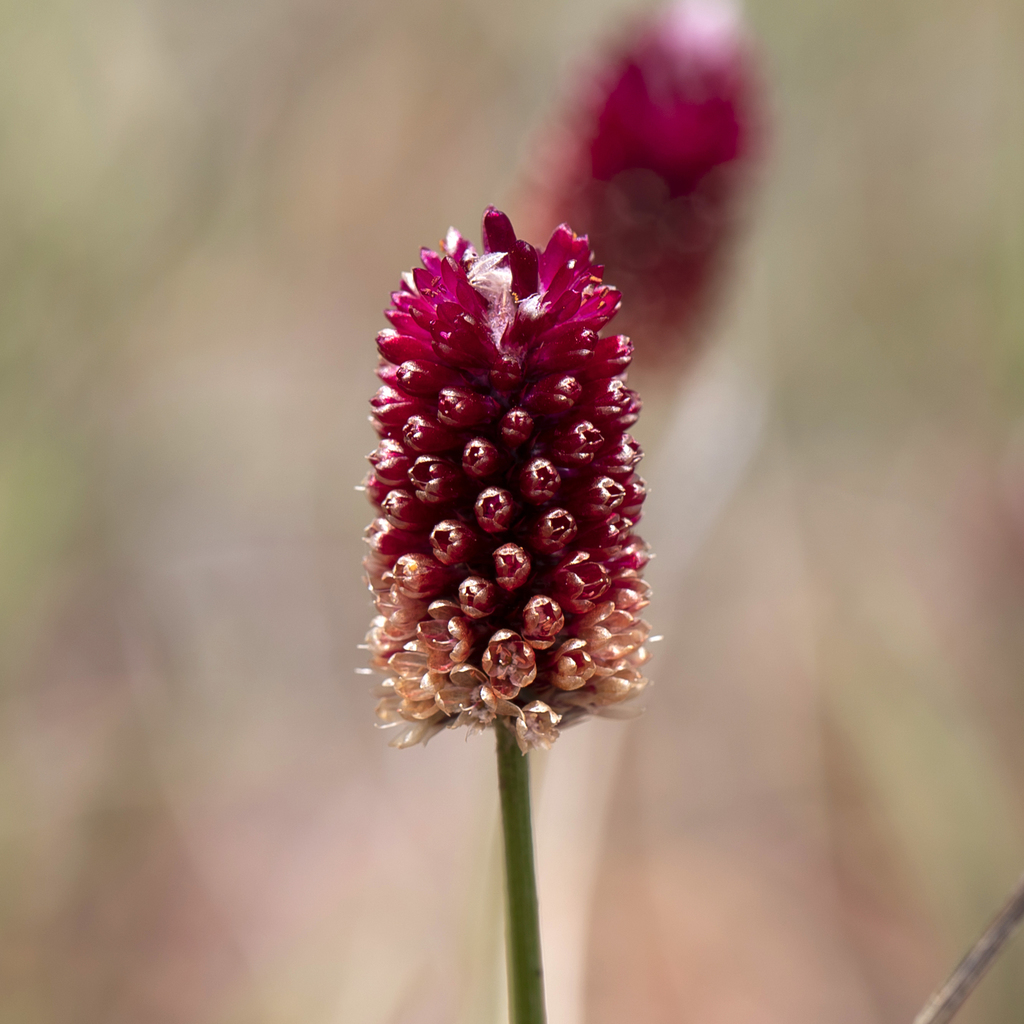
- Near Camooweal

Scientific classification
- Kingdom: Plantae
- Clade: Tracheophytes
- Clade: Angiosperms
- Clade: Eudicots
- Order: Caryophyllales
- Family: Amaranthaceae
- Genus: Ptilotus
- Species: P. spicatus

Binomial name
- Ptilotus spicatus F.Muell. ex Benth.

Synonyms
- List: Ptilotus leianthus Domin; Ptilotus spicatus subsp. burbidgeanus Benl; Ptilotus spicatus subsp. leianthus (Benth.) Benl; Ptilotus spicatus subsp. longiceps A.D.Chapm. nom. inval., nom. nud.; Ptilotus spicatus F.Muell. ex Benth. subsp. spicatus; Ptilotus spicatus var. burbidgeanus (Benl) Benl; Ptilotus spicatus var. leianthus Benth.; Ptilotus spicatus var. longiceps Benl; Ptilotus spicatus F.Muell. ex Benth. var. spicatus; Trichinium spicatum (F.Muell. ex Benth.) Ewart & O.B.Davies; Ptilotus corymbosus auct. non R.Br.: Mueller, F.J.H. von (1862), Fragmenta Phytographiae Australiae

= Ptilotus spicatus =

Species of herb

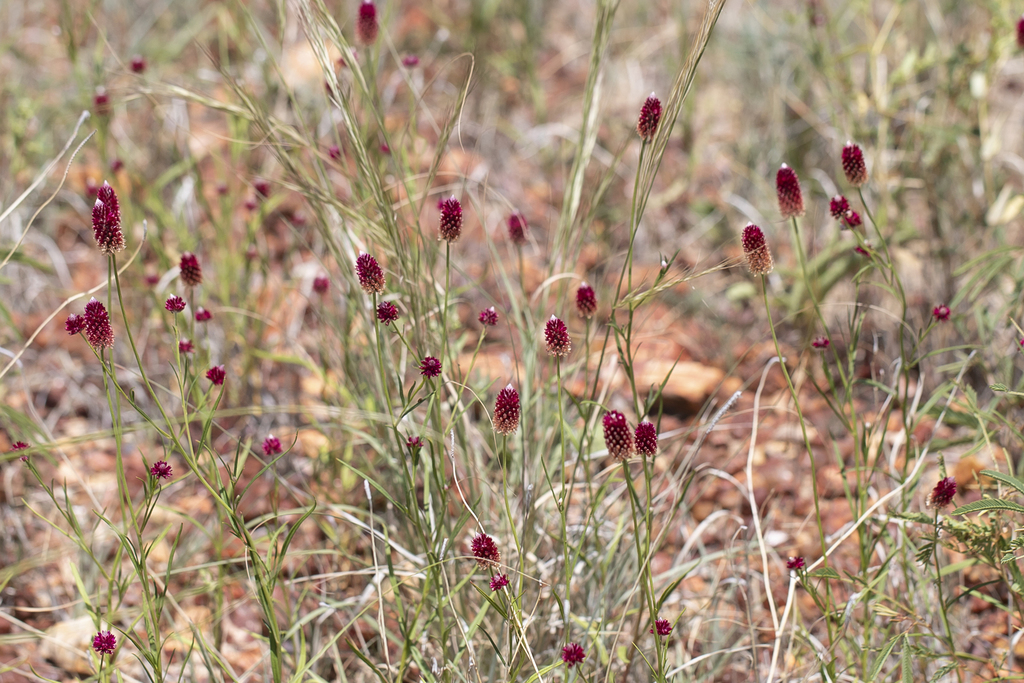
Habit

Ptilotus spicatus is a species of flowering plant in the Amaranthaceae family and is endemic to northern Australia. It is an annual or perennial herb, sometimes with several more or less erect stems, glabrous stem leaves and magenta or red flowers arranged in an oval or cylindrical spike on flowering stems.

== Description ==
Ptilotus spicatus is an annual or perennial herb with a single or several stems 0.26–1.5 m (10 in – 4 ft 11 in) high and covered with soft hairs, at least when young. There are no leaves at the base of the plant, but the stem leaves are 5–70 mm (0.20–2.76 in) long and 0.5–5 mm (0.020–0.197 in) wide. The flowers are magenta or red and arranged in oval or cylindrical spikes on the ends of stems. The bracts are colourless or hairy, 2.7–3.5 mm (0.11–0.14 in) long with a prominent midrib, and the bracteoles are similar, 3.5–4 mm (0.14–0.16 in) long. The tepals are 5.2–6.0 mm (0.20–0.24 in) long and the style is 3.0–3.3 mm (0.12–0.13 in) long, curved or straight and fixed to the centre of the ovary. Flowering occurs from March to May or August, and the seeds are 1.3–1.5 mm (0.051–0.059 in) long and glossy brown.

== Taxonomy ==
Ptilotus spicatus was first formally described in 1870 by George Bentham in his Flora Australiensis from an unpublished description by Ferdinand von Mueller of a specimen collected near the Victoria River. The specific epithet (spicatus) means 'spicatus'.

== Distribution and habitat ==
Ptilotus spicatus grows in clay or on sandstone and is widespread in the north of Western Australia, the north of the Northern Territory and Queensland.
