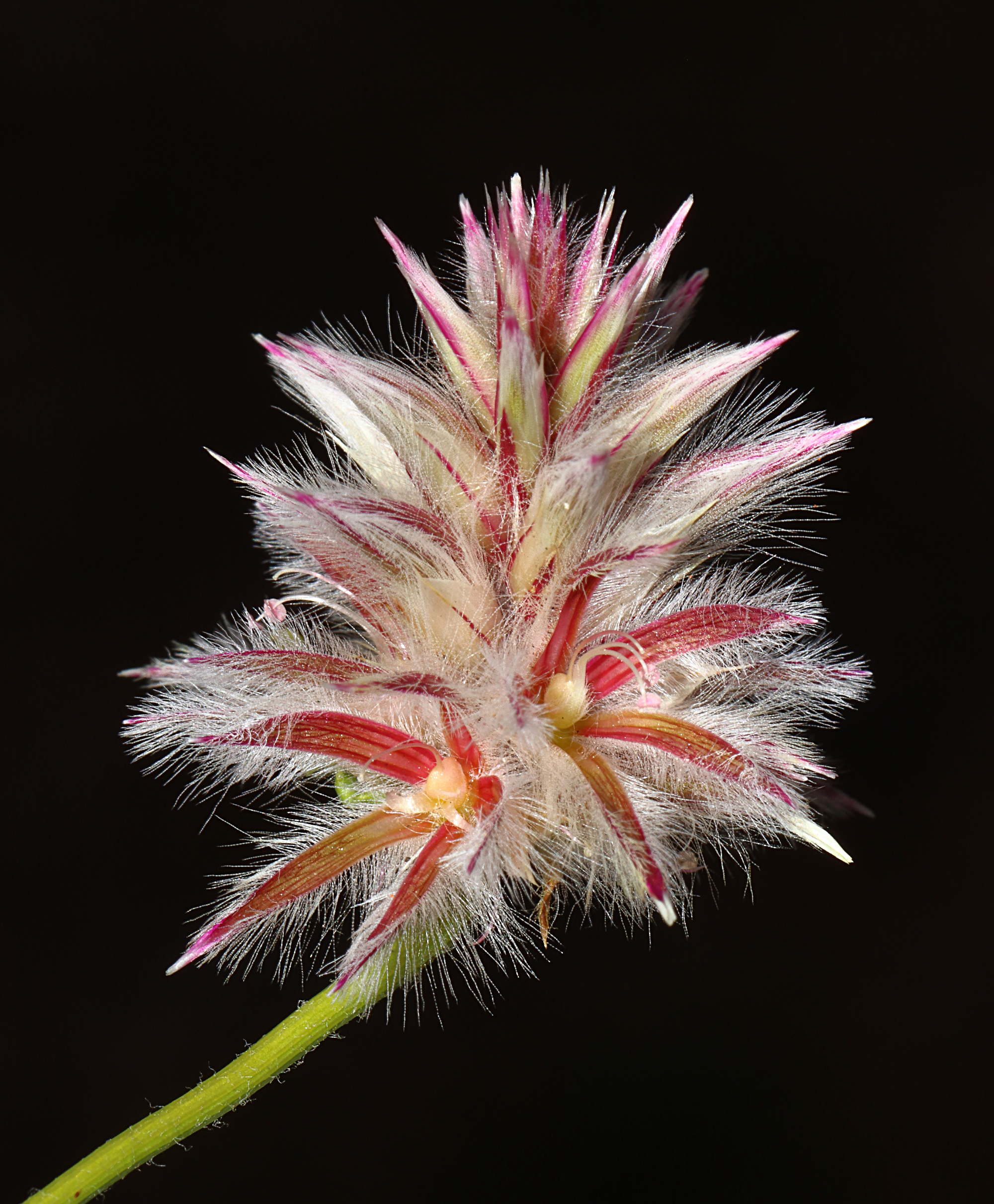

Scientific classification
- Kingdom: Plantae
- Clade: Embryophytes
- Clade: Tracheophytes
- Clade: Spermatophytes
- Clade: Angiosperms
- Clade: Eudicots
- Order: Caryophyllales
- Family: Amaranthaceae
- Genus: Ptilotus
- Species: P. sericostachyus

Binomial name
- Ptilotus sericostachyus (Nees) F.Muell.

Synonyms
- Ptilotus sericostachyus f. floribundus (Moq.) Benl; Ptilotus sericostachyus (Nees) F.Muell. f. sericostachyus; Trichinium sericostachyum Nees

= Ptilotus sericostachyus =

Species of flowering plant

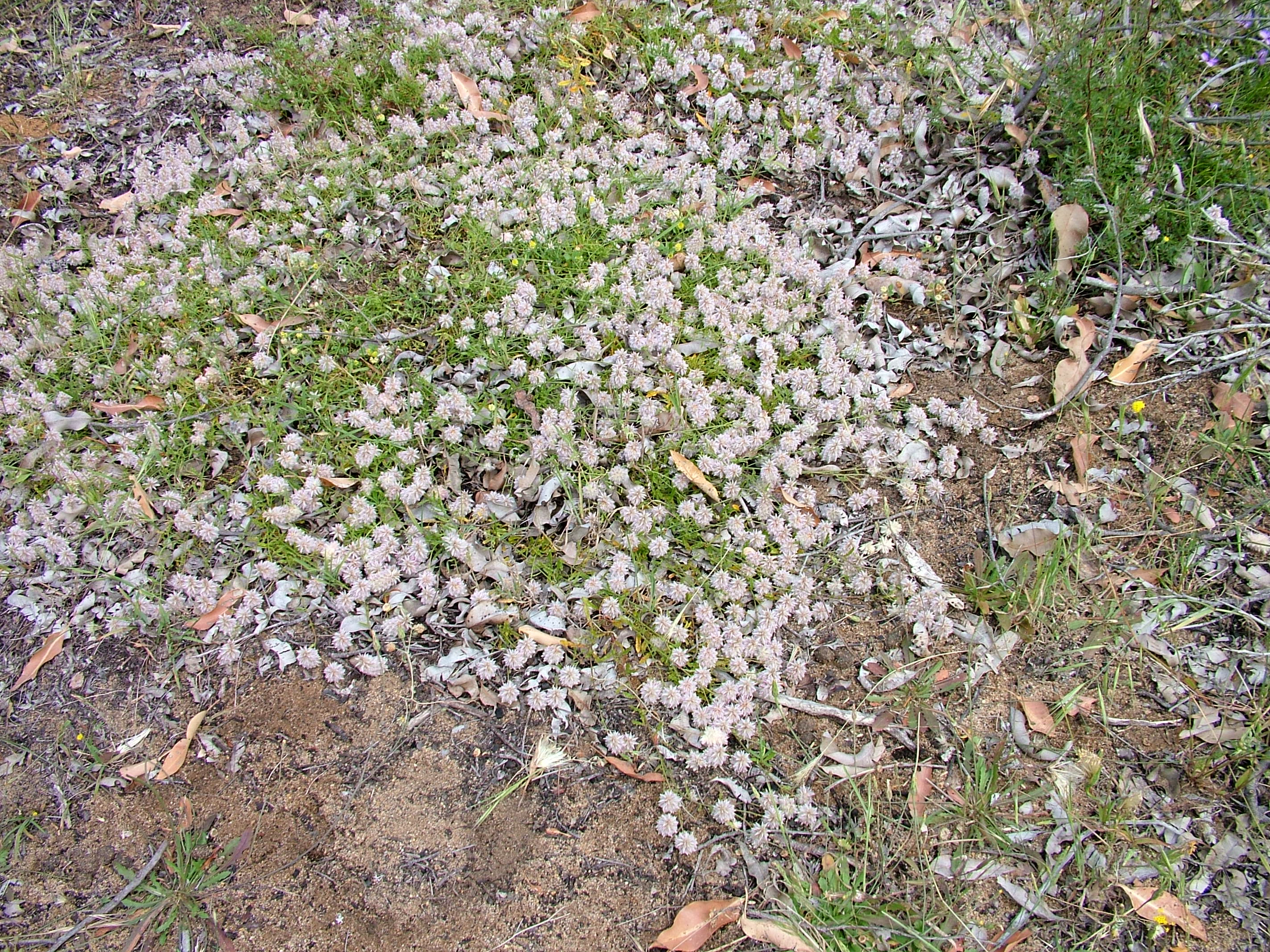
Habit near Perth

Ptilotus sericostachyus is a species of flowering plant in the family Amaranthaceae and is endemic to the south-west of Western Australia. It is a tufted, prostrate to ascending perennial herb with silvery foliage and dense flower spikes of pink to mauve flowers from September to December.

== Taxonomy ==
This species was first formally described in 1849 by Alfred Moquin-Tandon, who gave it the name Trichinium sericostachyum in Lehmann's Plantae Preissianae from specimens collected near the Limekiln, Perth in 1839. In 1868, Ferdinand von Mueller transferred the species to Ptilotus as P. sericostachyus in his Fragmenta Phytographiae Australiae. The specific epithet (sericostachyum) means 'silky', referring to the flower spike.

In 1965, Gerhard Benl reduced Trichinium roseum to a subspecies of Ptilotus as P. sericostachyus subsp. roseus in Mitteilungen der Botanischen Staatssammlung Munchen, and its name and that of the implicit autonym are accepted by the Australian Plant Census:

- Ptilotus sericostachyus subsp. roseus (Moq.) Benl
- Ptilotus sericostachyus (Nees) F.Muell. subsp. sericostachyus (the autonym)

== Distribution and habitat ==
Ptilotus sericostachyus occurs in the south-west of Western Australia where it grows in sandy soils, gravel and on limestone in the Avon Wheatbelt, Geraldton Sandplains, Jarrah Forest, Swan Coastal Plain and Warren bioregions of south-western Western Australia.

== Conservation status ==
Ptilotus sericostachyus is listed as 'not threatened' by the Government of Western Australia Department of Biodiversity, Conservation and Attractions, but subspecies roseus is listed as 'presumed extinct'.
