= Ptilotus subspinescens =

Conservation status
- Priority Three — Poorly Known Taxa (DEC)

Scientific classification
- Kingdom: Plantae
- Clade: Embryophytes
- Clade: Tracheophytes
- Clade: Spermatophytes
- Clade: Angiosperms
- Clade: Eudicots
- Order: Caryophyllales
- Family: Amaranthaceae
- Genus: Ptilotus
- Species: P. subspinescens

Binomial name
- Ptilotus subspinescens R.W.Davis

Species of herb

Ptilotus subspinescens is a species of flowering plant in the Amaranthaceae family and is endemic to the north-west of Western Australia. It is a compact shrub with branched, terete, glabrous, slightly spiny, glabrous stems, glabrous linear leaves and hemispherical or oval spikes of pink flowers.

== Description ==
Ptilotus subspinescens is a compact shrub that typically grows to a height of up to 80 cm (31 in) and has branched, terete, glabrous, slightly spiny stems. There are no leaves at the base of the plant, but the stem leaves are linear, 2–3.5 mm (0.079–0.138 in) long and 0.4–0.8 mm (0.016–0.031 in) wide. The flowers are borne in an oval or hemispherical spike 5–11 mm (0.20–0.43 in) long and 7–10 mm (0.28–0.39 in) wide on the ends of stems, with 4 to 12 flowers in each spike. The bracts are broadly egg-shaped, 1.4–1.7 mm (0.055–0.067 in) long, and the bracteoles broadly egg-shaped to round, 2.8–2.8 mm (0.11–0.11 in) long. The outer tepals are pink, elliptic, 6.0–7.2 mm (0.24–0.28 in) long and the inner tepals are pink, narrowly elliptic, 6.2–7.5 mm (0.24–0.30 in) long with folded margins. There are five stamens, the ovary is oval in outline and glabrous, and the style is 4.0–4.5 mm (0.16–0.18 in) long and straight, fixed to the centre of the ovary. The seeds are circular in outline, and dull, light brown.

== Taxonomy ==
Ptilotus subspinescens was first formally described in 2007 by Robert Davis in the journal Nuytsia, from specimens collected 59 km (37 mi) west-north-west of Tom Price in 2004. The specific epithet (subspinescens) means 'somewhat thorny', referring to the short, slightly sharply-pointed side branches.

== Distribution and habitat ==
This species of Ptilotus is only known from a few location in the regions around the Brockman mine site, where it grows in gentle rocky slopes and on scree slopes.

== Conservation status ==
Ptilotus subspinescens is listed as 'Priority Three' by the Government of Western Australia Department of Parks and Wildlife, meaning that it is poorly known and known from only a few locations but is not under imminent threat.
