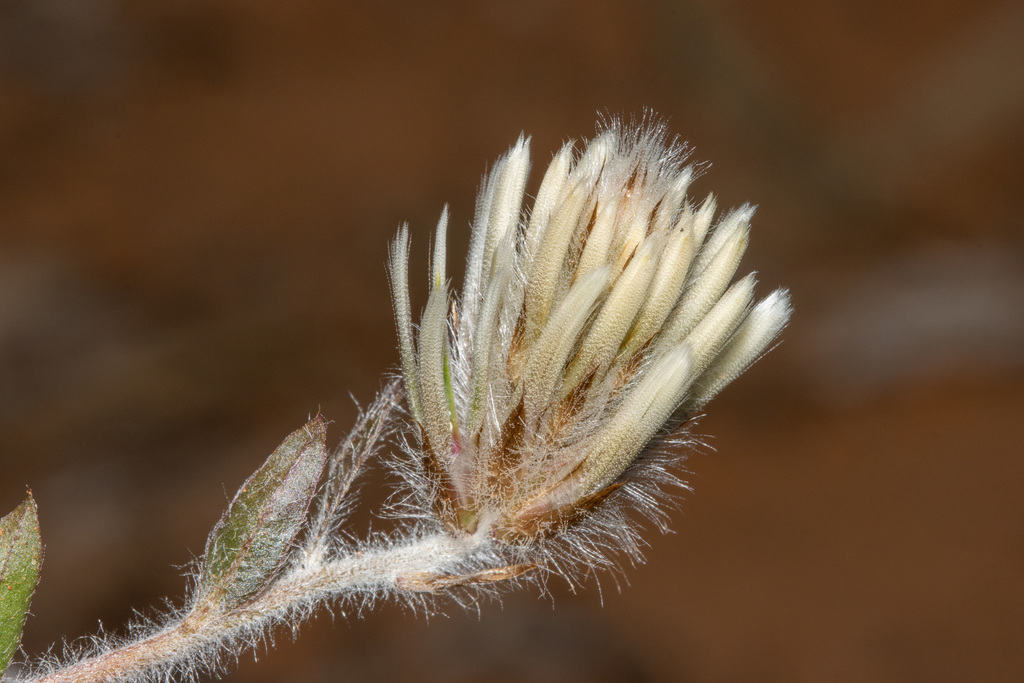

Scientific classification
- Kingdom: Plantae
- Clade: Embryophytes
- Clade: Tracheophytes
- Clade: Spermatophytes
- Clade: Angiosperms
- Clade: Eudicots
- Order: Caryophyllales
- Family: Amaranthaceae
- Genus: Ptilotus
- Species: P. seminudus

Binomial name
- Ptilotus seminudus (J.M.Black) J.M.Black

Synonyms
- Ptilotus sp. Sunrise Hill (M.A.Burgmann 4484) WA Herbarium; Trichinium seminudum J.M.Black

= Ptilotus seminudus =

Species of herb

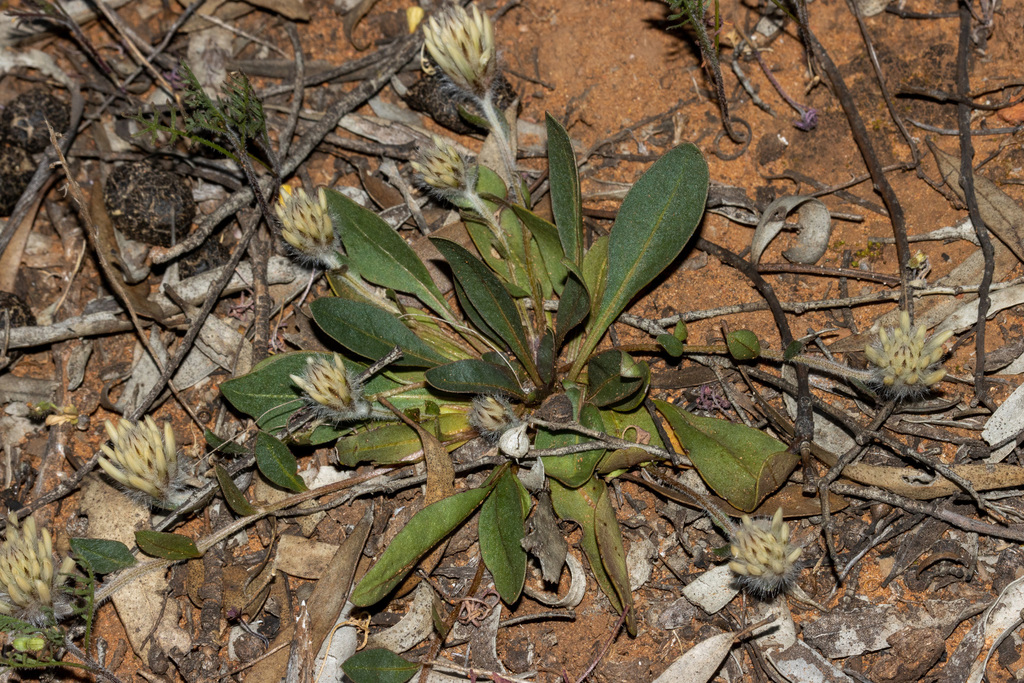
Habit in the Gawler Ranges National Park

Ptilotus seminudus, commonly known as rabbit tails, is a species of flowering plant in the Amaranthaceae family and is endemic to south-eastern, continental Australia. It is a perennial herb with hairy stems, especially when young, egg-shaped to lance-shaped leaves with the narrower end towards the base, and greyish or yellowish spikes of densely arranged flowers.

== Description ==
Ptilotus seminudus is a perennial herb and that typically grows to a height of 30 cm (12 in) high and has a deep taproot and hairy stems, especially when young. The leaves at the base of the plant are egg-shaped to lance-shaped with the narrower end towards the base, up to 50–120 mm (2.0–4.7 in) long and 8–25 mm (0.31–0.98 in) wide. The stem leaves are similar but smaller. The flowers are densely arranged on a greyish or yellowish spherical or oval spike 20–50 mm (0.79–1.97 in) long and 25–35 mm (0.98–1.38 in) in diameter. There are narrowly egg-shaped bracts 8–11 mm (0.31–0.43 in) long and similarly sized, broadly egg-shaped bracteoles at the base of the spikes. The perianth is about 15 mm (0.59 in) long and the outer surface is partly covered with long silky hairs, the inner surface mostly glabrous. There are two fertile stamens, the ovary on a short stalk, and the style is fixed to the side of the ovary. Flowering mainly occurs from September to November.

== Taxonomy ==
This species was first described in 1916 by John McConnell Black who gave it the name Trichinium seminudum in Transactions and Proceedings of the Royal Society of South Australia. In 1948 Black reassigned the species to the genus Ptilotus as P. seminudum. The specific epithet (seminudus) means 'half bare', referring to the lower half of the perianth that is glabrous.

== Distribution and habitat ==
Ptilotus seminudus is endemic to south-eastern continental Australia where it is found in New South Wales, Victoria, and the south of South Australia. It is widespread but rarely common, growing on sand dunes and plains, with heavier sandy loam soils.
