= Ptilotus tetrandrus =

Conservation status
- Priority One — Poorly Known Taxa (DEC)

Scientific classification
- Kingdom: Plantae
- Clade: Embryophytes
- Clade: Tracheophytes
- Clade: Spermatophytes
- Clade: Angiosperms
- Clade: Eudicots
- Order: Caryophyllales
- Family: Amaranthaceae
- Genus: Ptilotus
- Species: P. tetrandrus

Binomial name
- Ptilotus tetrandrus Benl

Species of plant

Ptilotus tetrandrus is a species of flowering plant of the family Amaranthaceae and is endemic to inland regions of Western Australia. It is an annual herb with several more or less erect, glabrous stems, stem leaves arranged alternately, and cylindrical spikes of green or brown flowers.

== Description ==
Ptilotus tetrandrus is an annual herb that typically grows to a height of 15–30 cm (5.9–11.8 in) with stems that become glabrous with age. There are no leaves at the base of the plant. The stem leaves are arranged alternately, 8–45 mm (0.31–1.77 in) long and 1.5–5 mm (0.059–0.197 in) wide. The flowers are borne in a green or brown cylindrical spike, the bracts glabrous, 3.5–4.0 mm (0.14–0.16 in) long and the bracteoles 2.0–2.5 mm (0.079–0.098 in) long, both with an obscure midrib. The outer tepals are mostly 5.2–5.5 mm (0.20–0.22 in) long, and the inner tepals 4.2–4.5 mm (0.17–0.18 in) long. The style is 4.0–4.5 mm (0.16–0.18 in) long and fixed to the side of the ovary.

== Taxonomy ==
Ptilotus tetrandrus was first formally described in 1978 by Gerhard Benl in the journal Nuytsia from specimens collected near Carslakes Well on Glenorn Station in 1974. The specific epithet (tetrandrus) means 'four stamens'.

== Distribution and habitat ==
This species of Ptilotus grows in loamy sand in the Avon Wheatbelt, Little Sandy Desert and Murchison bioregions of inland Western Australia.

== Conservation status ==
Ptilotus tetrandrus is listed as "Priority One" by the Government of Western Australia Department of Biodiversity, Conservation and Attractions, meaning that it is known from only one or a few locations where it is potentially at risk.
