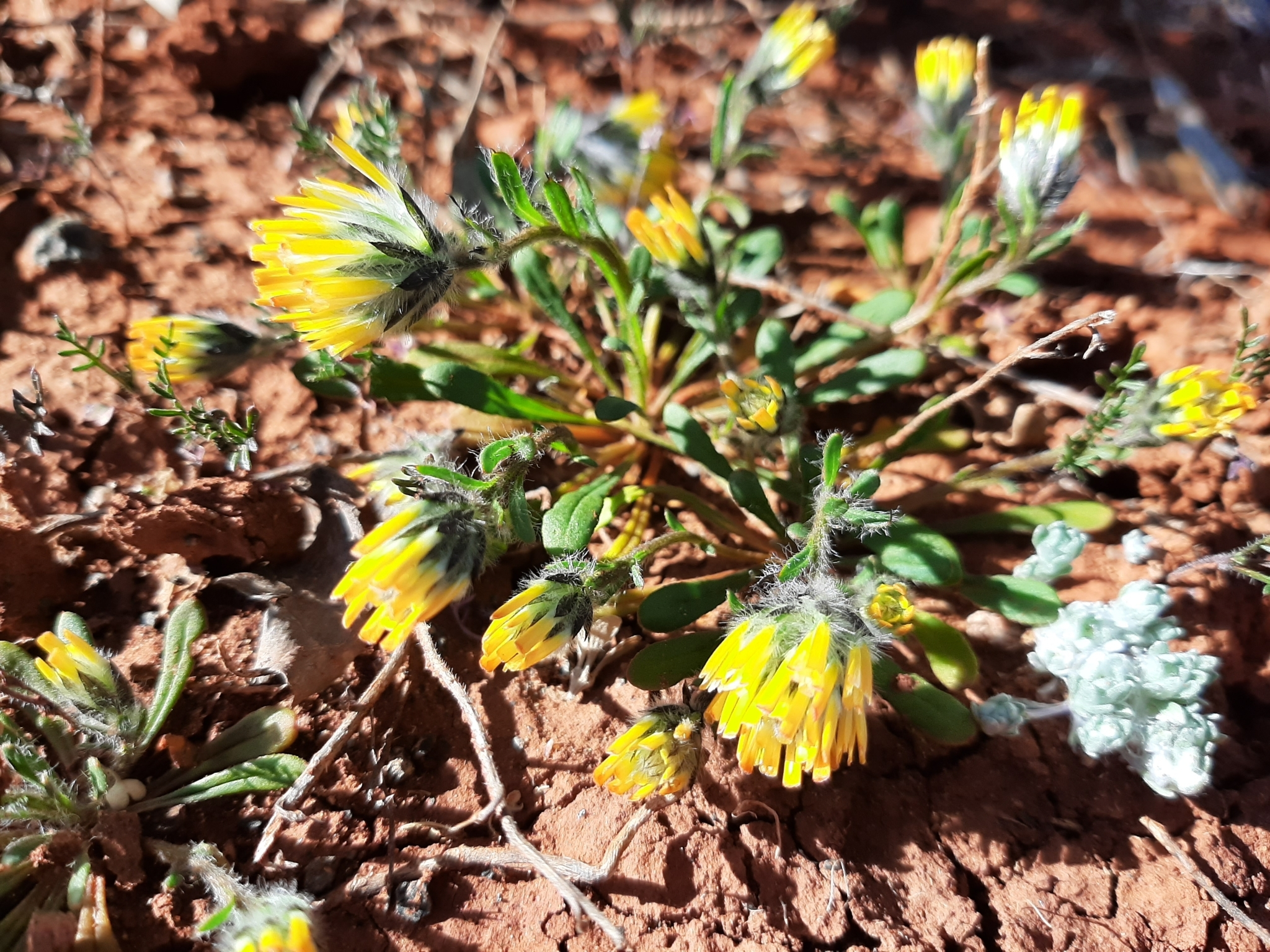
- Near Southern Cross

Scientific classification
- Kingdom: Plantae
- Clade: Tracheophytes
- Clade: Angiosperms
- Clade: Eudicots
- Order: Caryophyllales
- Family: Amaranthaceae
- Genus: Ptilotus
- Species: P. carlsonii

Binomial name
- Ptilotus carlsonii F.Muell.

Synonyms
- Ptilotus carlsoni F.Muell. orth. var.; Trichinium carlsoni S.Moore orth. var.; Trichinium carlsonii (F.Muell.) S.Moore

= Ptilotus carlsonii =

Species of grass-like plant

Ptilotus carlsonii is a species of flowering plant in the family Amaranthaceae and is endemic to inland Western Australia. It is an erect or spreading annual herb with hairy leaves and oval or hemispherical spikes of yellow or orange flowers.

== Description ==
Ptilotus carlsonii is an erect or spreading annual herb that typically grows to 5–30 cm (2.0–11.8 in) high with several more or less prostrate, hairy stems. Its leaves are arranged alternately, 5–100 mm (0.20–3.94 in) long and 0.5–10 mm (0.020–0.394 in) wide. The flowers are densely arranged in oval or hemispherical, yellow or orange spikes. The bracts are 6–8 mm (0.24–0.31 in) long and the bracteoles 5.1–6.0 mm (0.20–0.24 in) long, coloured, hairy and awned. The outer tepals are 10.2–11.7 mm (0.40–0.46 in) long, the inner tepals 9.8–11.7 mm (0.39–0.46 in) long. The style is 1.7 mm (0.067 in) long, curved and obliquely fixed to the ovary. Flowering occurs from August to October.

== Taxonomy ==
Ptilotus carlsonii was first formally described in 1888 by Ferdinand von Mueller in The Victorian Naturalist from specimens collected by W. Sayer and A. Carlson. The etymology of (carlsonii) was not specified, but presumably honoured one of the collectors of the type material.

== Distribution ==
Ptilotus carlsonii grows on clay soils on plains in the Avon Wheatbelt, Coolgardie, Murchison and Nullarbor bioregions of inland Western Australia.

== Conservation status ==
This species of Ptilotus is listed as "not threatened" by the Government of Western Australia Department of Biodiversity, Conservation and Attractions.

== Gallery ==
Ptilotus carlsonii

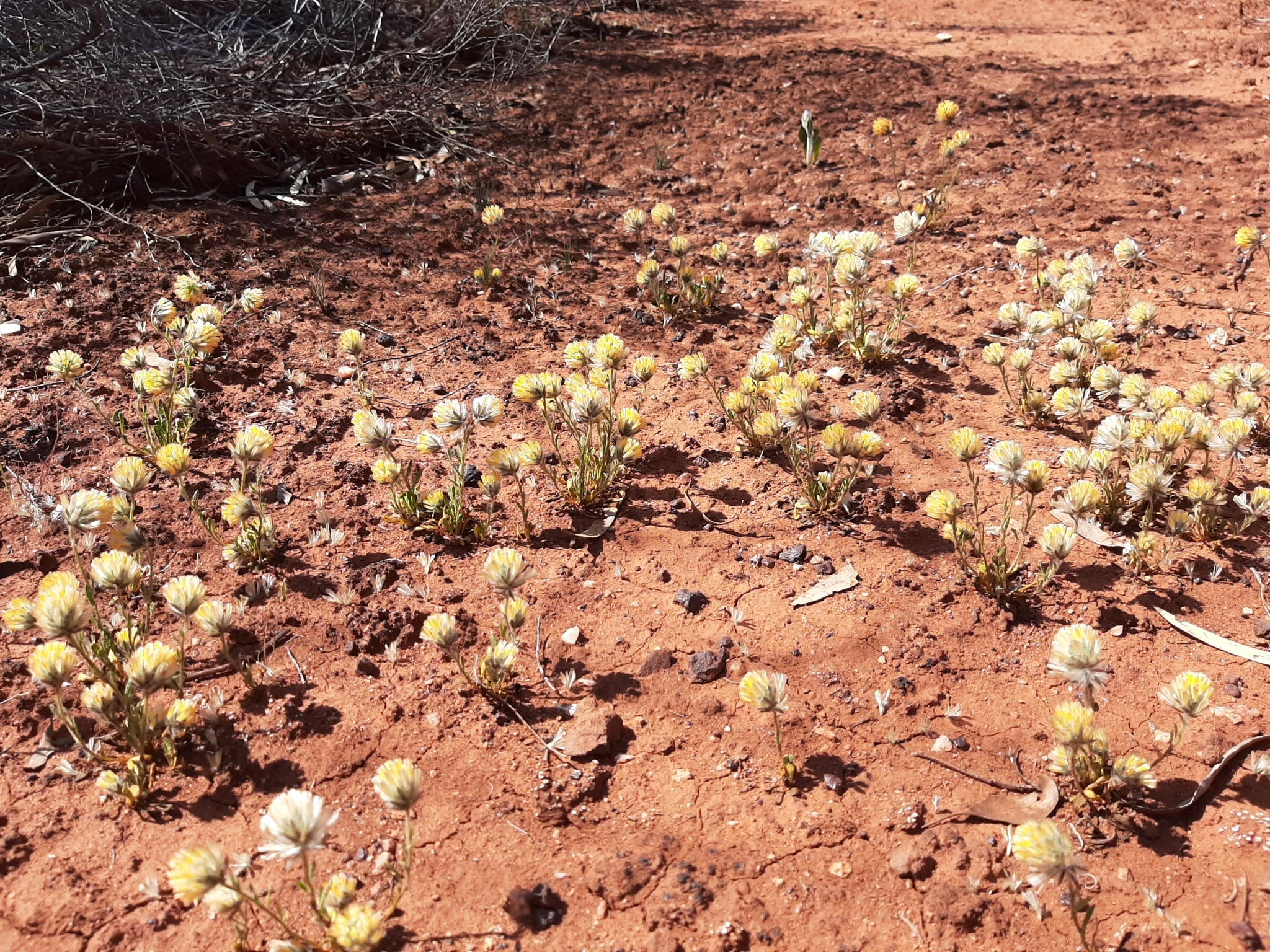

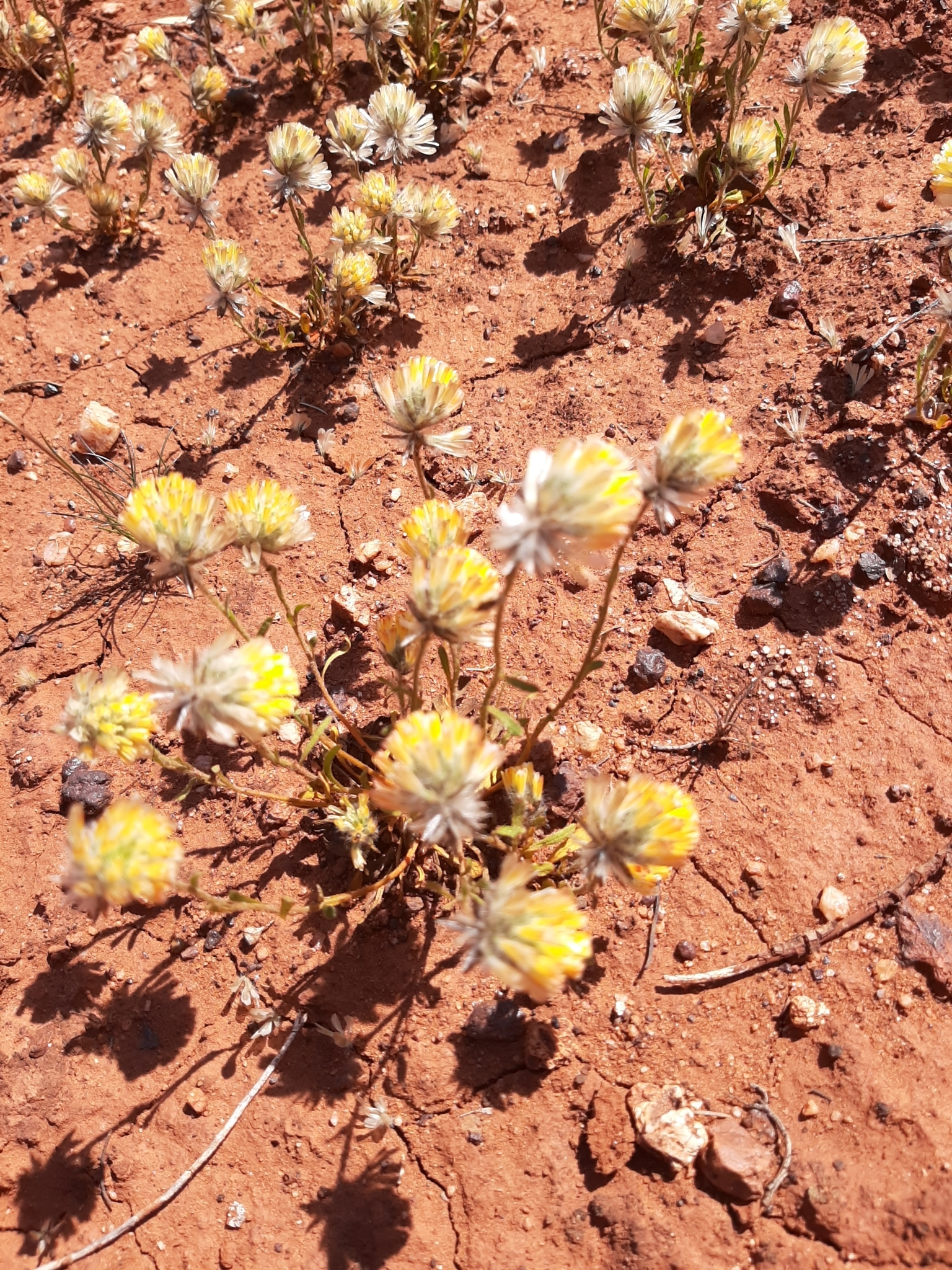

== See also ==
- List of Ptilotus species
