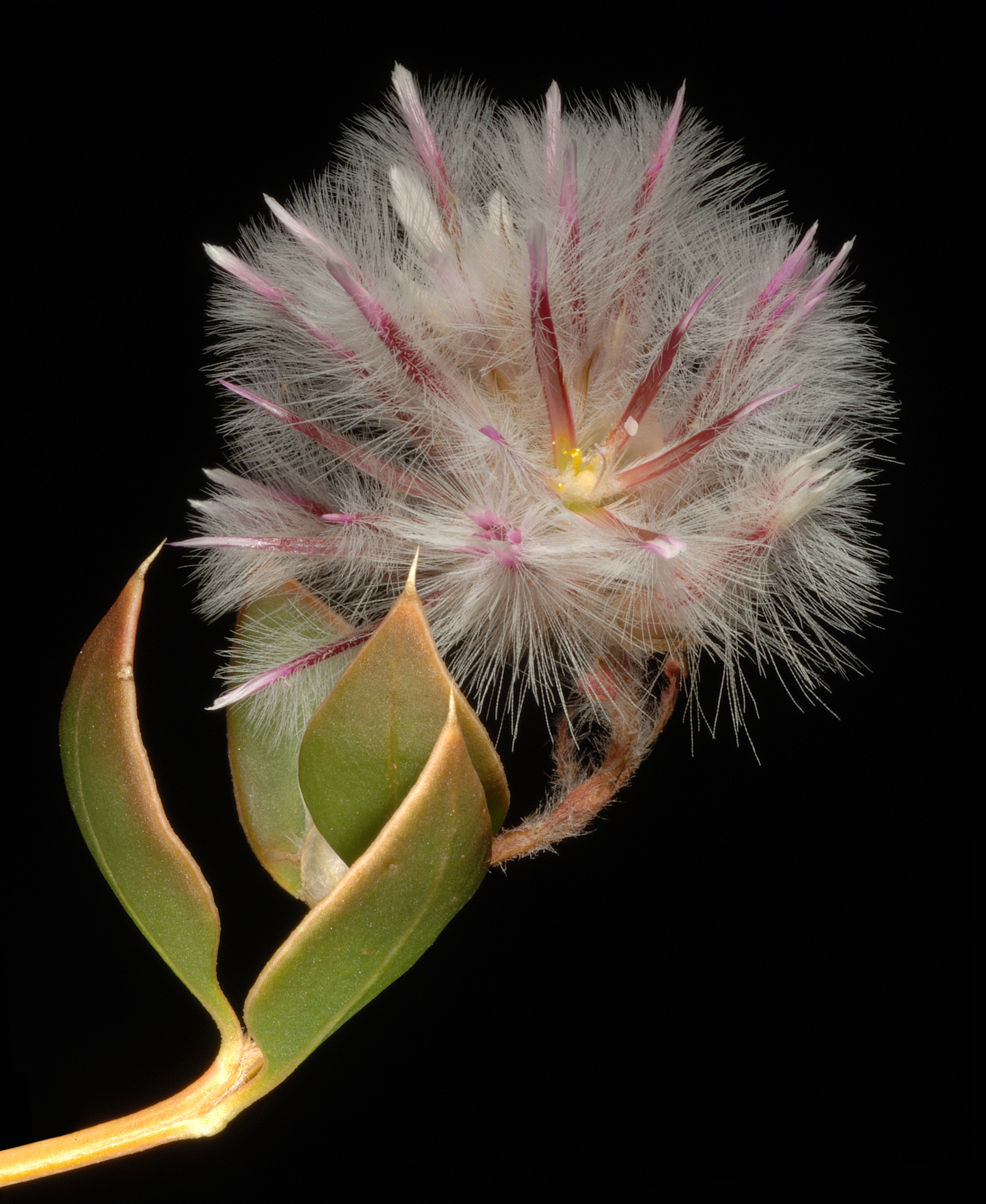

Scientific classification
- Kingdom: Plantae
- Clade: Tracheophytes
- Clade: Angiosperms
- Clade: Eudicots
- Order: Caryophyllales
- Family: Amaranthaceae
- Genus: Ptilotus
- Species: P. axillaris

Binomial name
- Ptilotus axillaris (F.Muell. ex Benth.) F.Muell.

Synonyms
- Ptilotus axillaris (F.Muell. ex Benth.) F.Muell. isonym; Trichinium axillare F.Muell. ex Benth.

= Ptilotus axillaris =

Species of grass-like plant

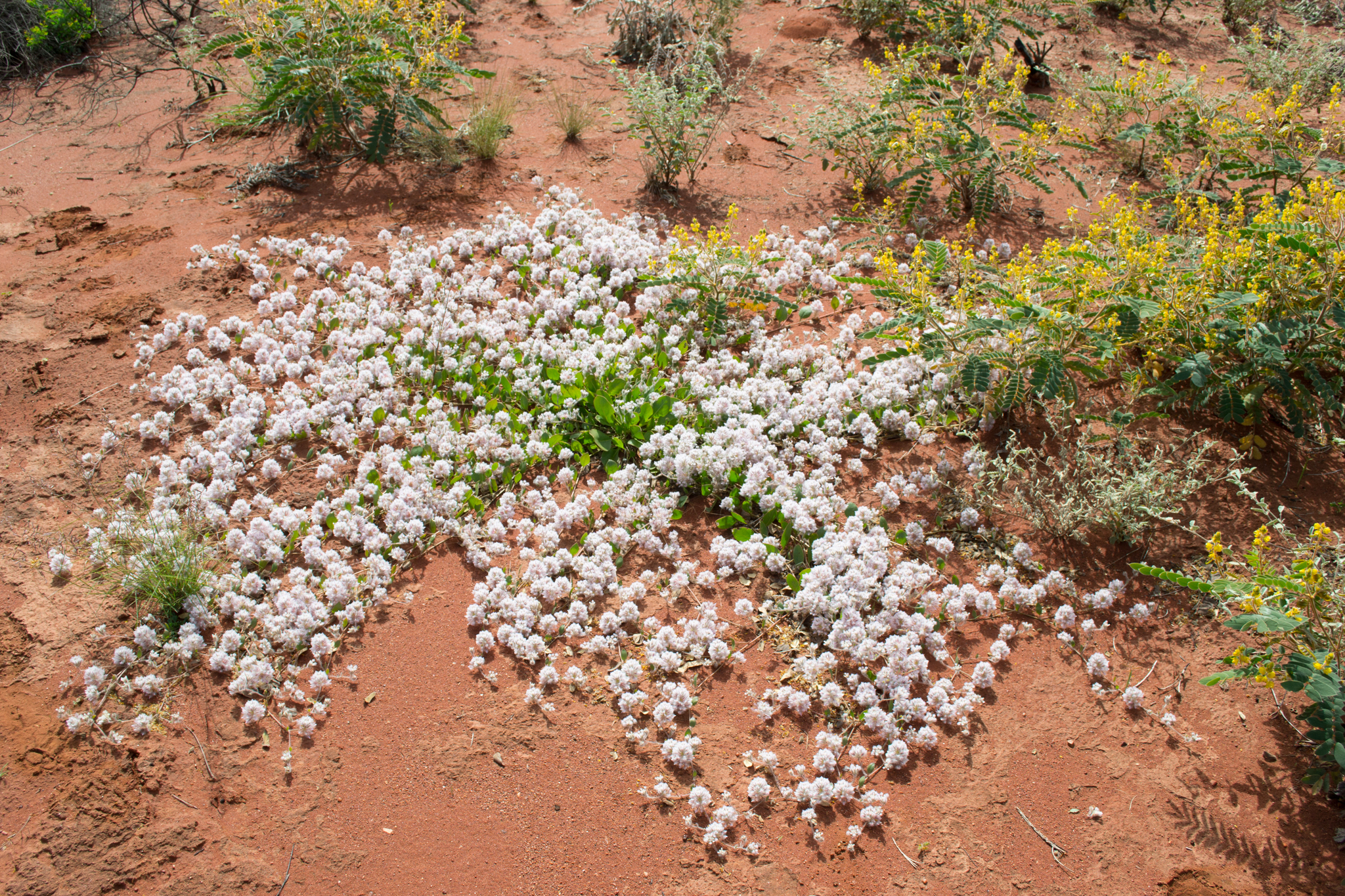
Habit 82 km (51 mi) north of Newman

Ptilotus axillaris, commonly known as mat mulla mulla, is a species of flowering plant in the family Amaranthaceae and is endemic to the north of Western Australia. It is a prostrate annual herb with several stems, egg-shaped leaves, and pink or magenta, oval or cylindrical spikes of hairy, densely arranged flowers with two fertile stamens.

== Description ==
Ptilotus axillaris is a prostrate annual herb that has several stems, typically grows up to 30–120 mm (1.2–4.7 in) high and has oval to spatula-shaped leaves arranged alternately on the stems, 7–110 mm (0.28–4.33 in) long and 2–25 mm (0.079–0.984 in) wide. The flowers are pink or magenta and densely arranged in oval to cylindrical spikes 15–50 mm (0.59–1.97 in) long and 25–40 mm (0.98–1.57 in) wide. There is a bract 7.5–9 mm (0.30–0.35 in) long and colourless bracteoles 6.5–6.8 mm (0.26–0.27 in) long at the base of the flowers. The outer tepals are mostly 13–17.5 mm (0.51–0.69 in) long and the inner tepals are 11.5–16 mm (0.45–0.63 in) long with a prominent midrib. Flowering occurs from April to November.

== Taxonomy ==
This species was first described in 1870 by George Bentham from an unpublished description by Ferdinand von Mueller, and was given the name Trichinium axillare in Flora Australiensis. In 1881, von Mueller transferred the species to the genus, Ptilotus as P. axillaris. The specific epithet (axillaris) means 'axillary', referring to the flowers.

== Distribution and habitat ==
Ptilotus axillaris grows on stony plains and sand dunes in the Carnarvon, Dampierland, Gascoyne, Gibson Desert, Great Sandy Desert, Little Sandy Desert, and Pilbara bioregions of northern Western Australia.

== Conservation status ==
Ptilotus axillaris is listed as "not threatened" by the Government of Western Australia Department of Biodiversity, Conservation and Attractions.

== Gallery ==
Ptilotus axillaris

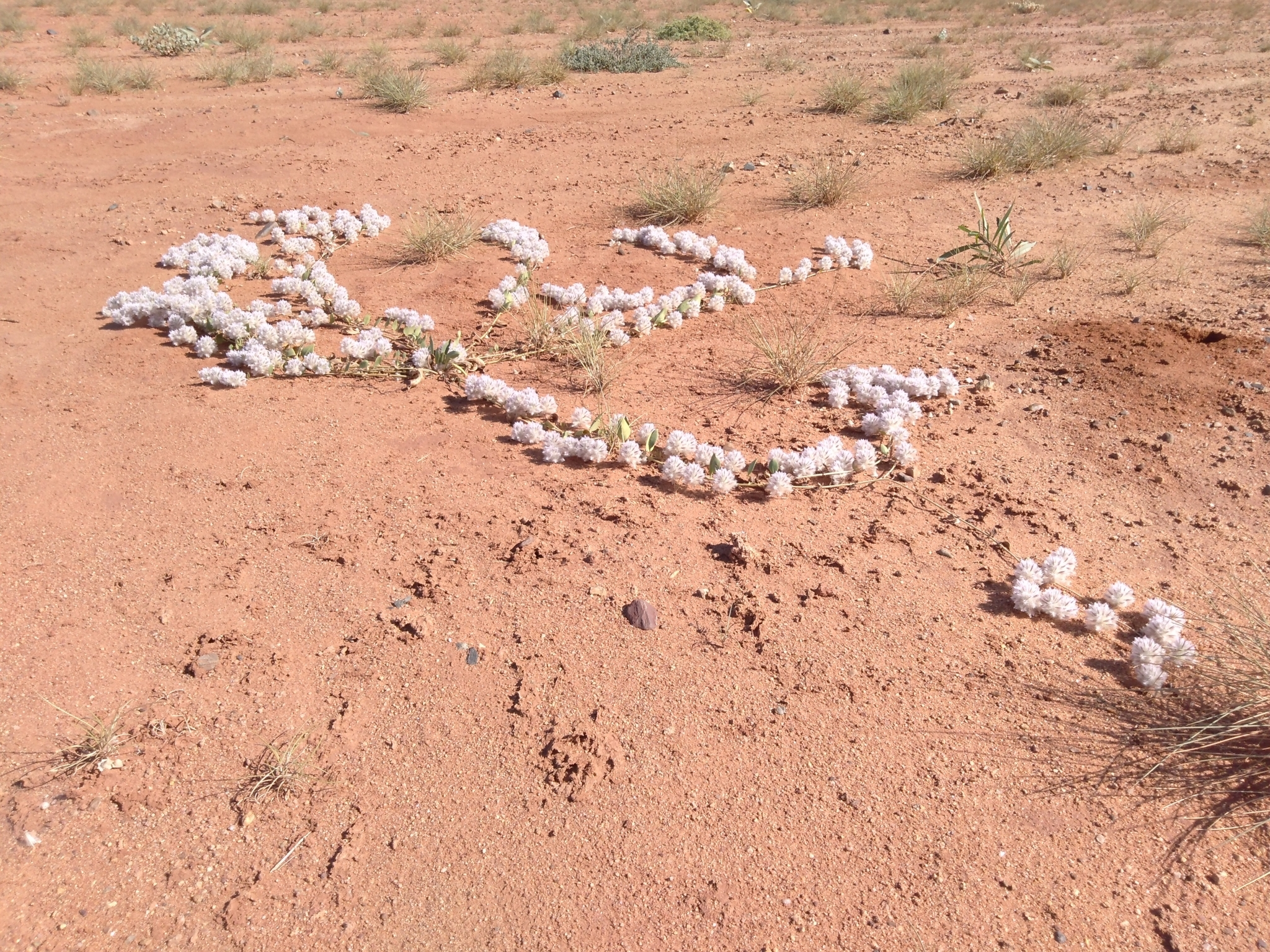

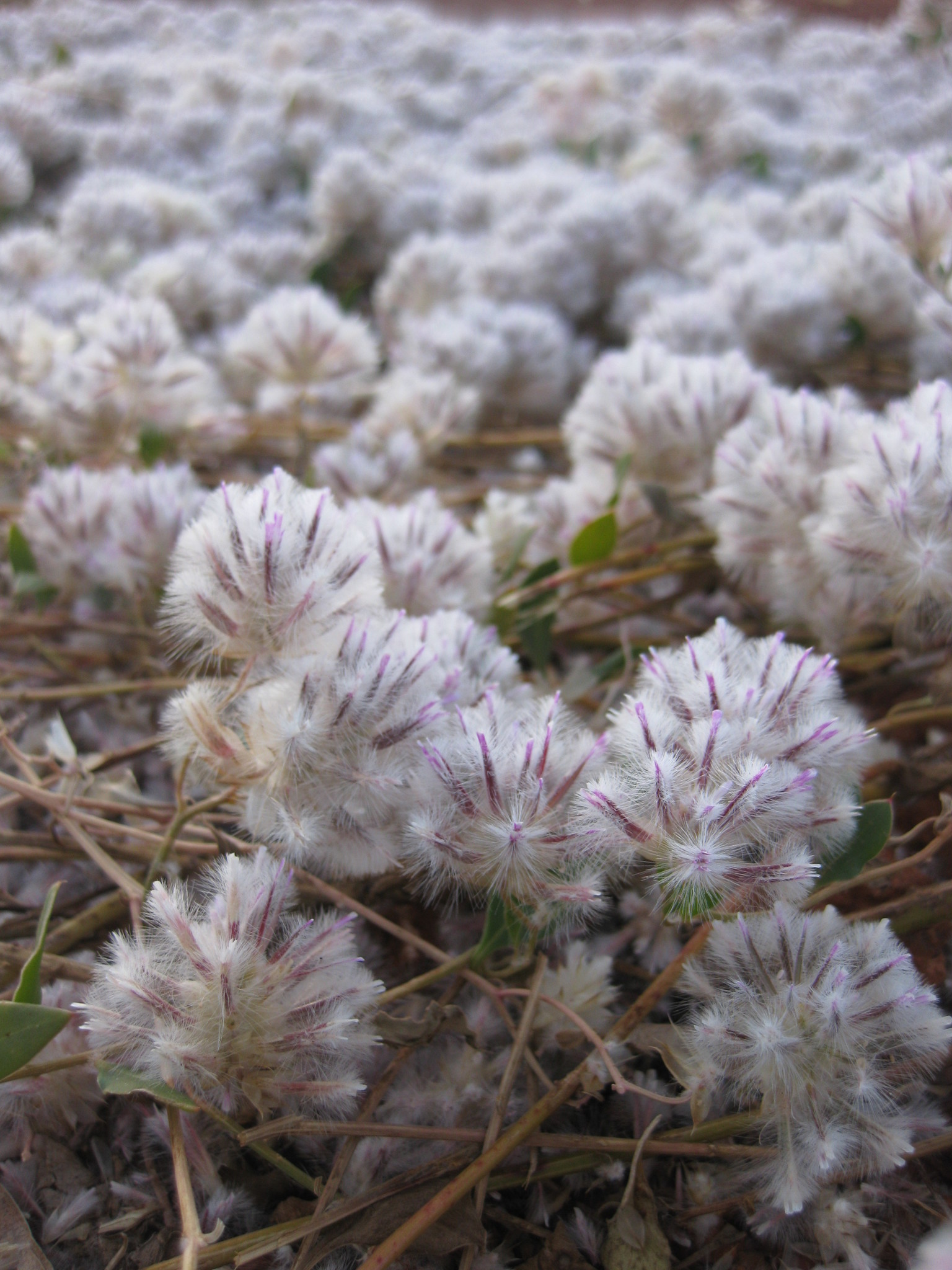

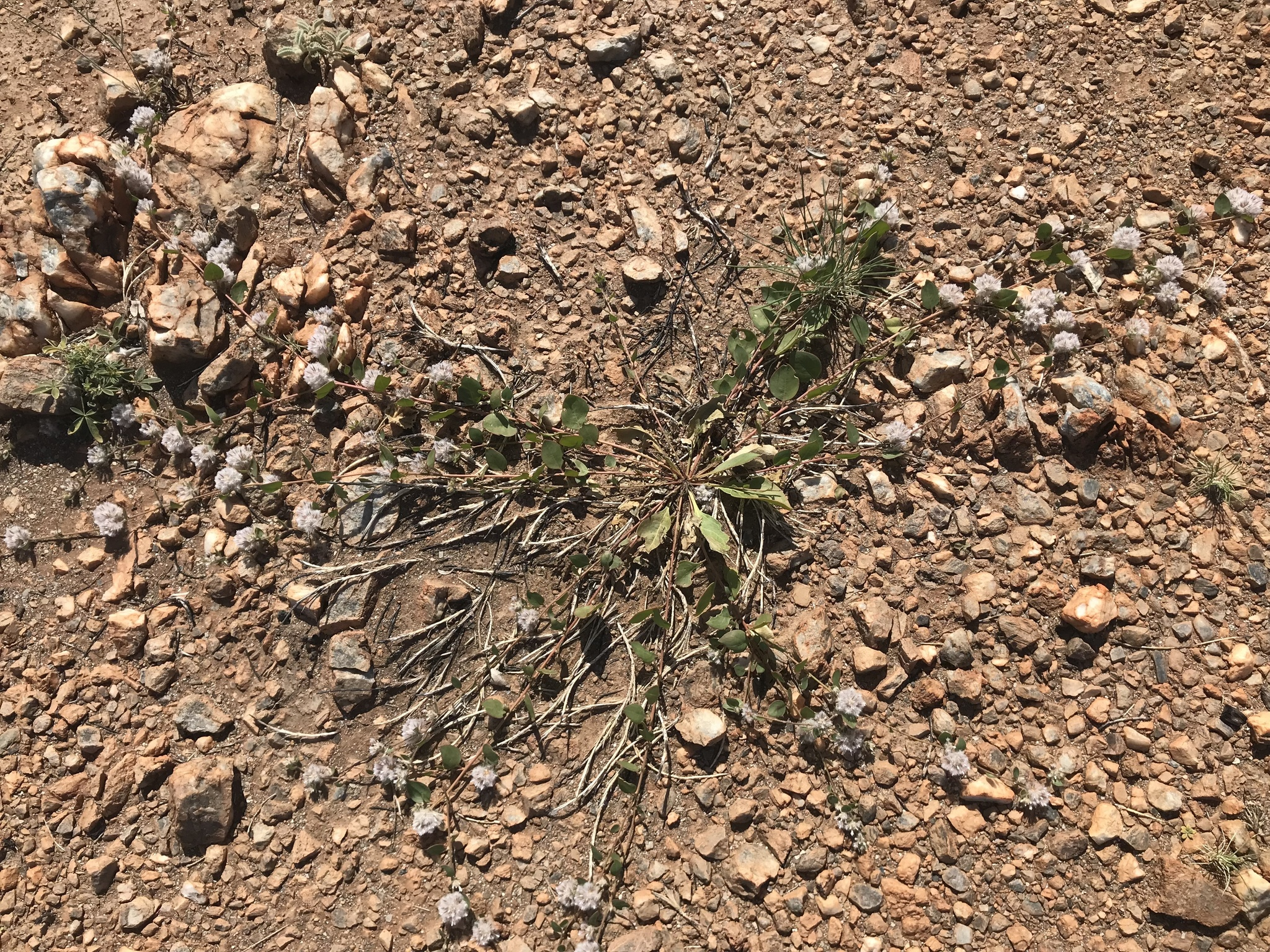

== See also ==
- List of Ptilotus species
