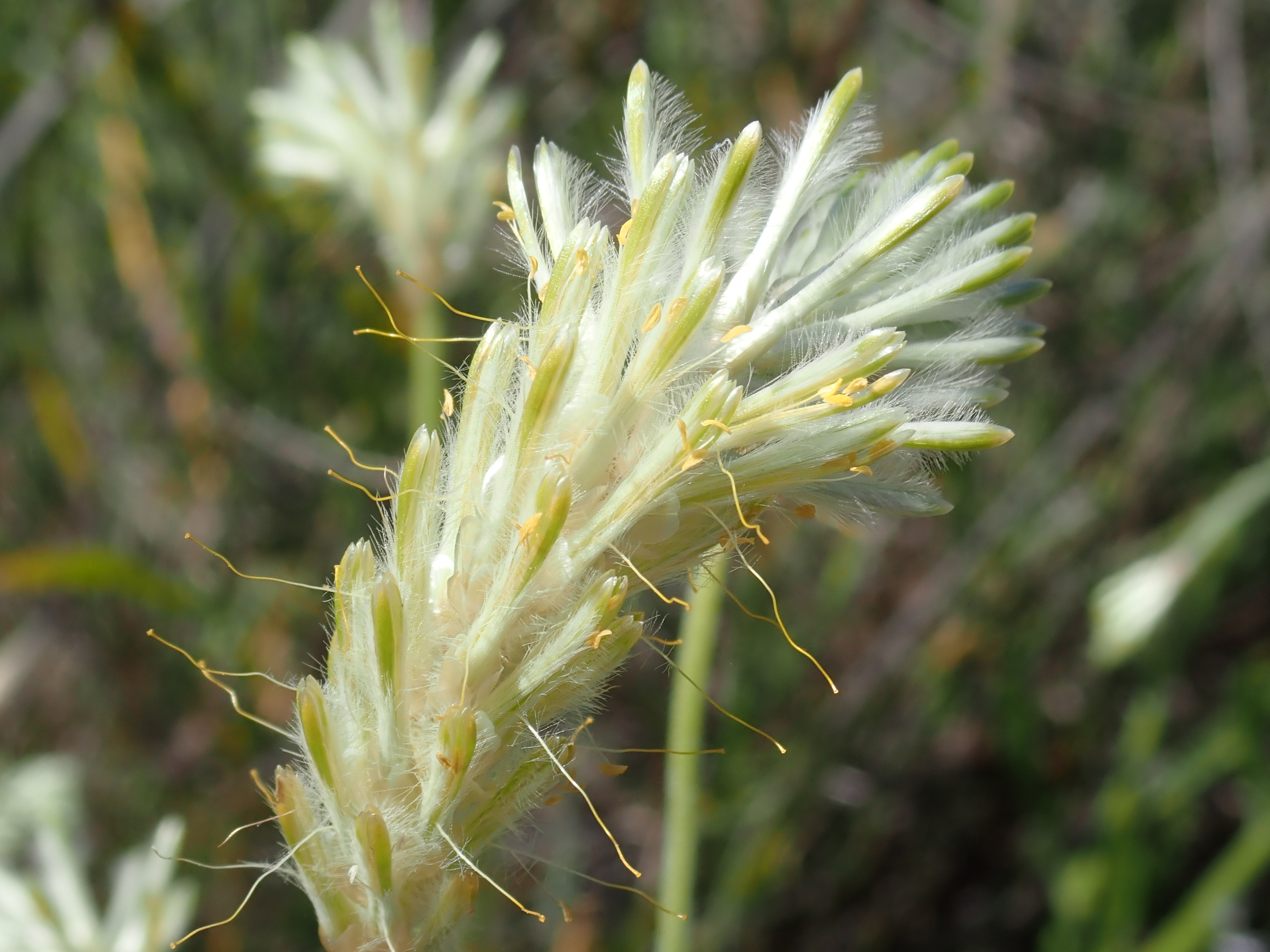

Scientific classification
- Kingdom: Plantae
- Clade: Tracheophytes
- Clade: Angiosperms
- Clade: Eudicots
- Order: Caryophyllales
- Family: Amaranthaceae
- Genus: Ptilotus
- Species: P. polystachyus

Binomial name
- Ptilotus polystachyus (Gaudich.) F.Muell.

Synonyms
- List: Ptilotus alopecuroides F.Muell. orth. var.; Ptilotus alopecuroideus (Lindl.) F.Muell.; Ptilotus alopecuroideus (Lindl.) F.Muell. f. alopecuroideus; Ptilotus alopecuroideus f. rubriflorus (J.M.Black) Benl; Ptilotus alopecuroideus (Lindl.) F.Muell. var. alopecuroideus; Ptilotus alopecuroideus var. rubriflorum J.M.Black orth. var.; Ptilotus alopecuroideus var. rubriflorus J.M.Black nom. inval.; Ptilotus polystachyus f. arthrotrichus Benl; Ptilotus polystachyus (Gaudich.) F.Muell. f. polystachyus; Ptilotus polystachyus f. ruber Benl; Ptilotus polystachyus f. rubriflorus (J.M.Black) Benl; Ptilotus polystachyus var. arthrotrichus Benl; Ptilotus polystachyus (Gaudich.) F.Muell. var. polystachyus; Trichinium alopecuroideum Lindl.; Trichinium alopecuroideum Lindl. var. alopecuroideum; Trichinium alopecuroideum var. rubriflorum J.M.Black; Trichinium candicans Nees; Trichinium conicum Lindl. nom. illeg.; Trichinium pallidum Moq.; Trichinium polystachyum Gaudich.; Trichinium preissii Nees

= Ptilotus polystachyus =

Species of grass-like plant

Ptilotus polystachyus, commonly known as long tails, Prince of Wales feather, bottle-washers or long pussy-tails, is an erect annual or short-lived perennial herb in the Amaranthaceae family and is found in all mainland states of Australia, and in the Northern Territory. It has linear to narrowly elliptic or lance shaped leaves, and cylindrical spikes of greenish yellow or dull purplish-brown flowers.

== Description ==
Ptilotus polystachyus is an annual or short-lived perennial plant that typically grows to a height of up to 0.15–1 m (5.9 in – 3 ft 3.4 in) and has ribbed stems. The stems and leaves have a few branched hairs, but often become glabrous with age. The stem leaves are arranged alternately, linear to oblong or narrowly elliptic to lance-shaped, 45–200 mm (1.8–7.9 in) long and 7–35 mm (0.28–1.38 in) wide on a short petiole and with wavy edges. There are no leaves at the base of the plant. The flowers are pale green, greenish yellow to straw-coloured or dull purplish brown and borne in a cylindrical spike 30–120 mm (1.2–4.7 in) long and about 30 mm (1.2 in) in diameter. There are egg-shaped bracts 3–4.5 mm (0.12–0.18 in) long and circular to broadly elliptic bracteoles about the same length, at the base of the flowers. The perianth is 13–16 mm (0.51–0.63 in) long, the tepals fairly densely covered with long, silky hairs on the outside but glabrous inside. There are three or four stamens, and the ovary is sessile with an eccentric style. Flowering occurs in most months, but mainly between May and November.

== Taxonomy ==
This species was first formally described in 1829 by Charles Gaudichaud-Beaupré who gave it the name Trichinium polystachyum in his Voyage Autour du Monde ... sur les Corvettes de S.M. l'Uranie et la Physicienne. Botanique, from specimens collected near Shark Bay. In 1868, Ferdinand von Mueller transferred the species to Ptilotus as P. polystachyus in his Fragmenta Phytographiae Australiae. The specific epithet (polystachyus) means 'many flower spikes'.

== Distribution and habitat ==
Ptilotus polystachyus is endemic to Australia and is found in all mainland states and the Northern Territory. In Western Australia, it grows in red soils, sand and on sandstone on stony hills and plateaus, in the Northern Territory mostly on sandplains, dunefields, and intermittent watercourses, and a wide variety of habitats in South Australia. In New South Wales it is common in the drier areas of that state, and is rare and confined to the far north-west of Victoria where it grows on low dunes and heavier soils of the Murray River floodplain. The species is listed as of "least concern" in Queensland.
