= Ptilotus conicus =

Scientific classification
- Kingdom: Plantae
- Clade: Tracheophytes
- Clade: Angiosperms
- Clade: Eudicots
- Order: Caryophyllales
- Family: Amaranthaceae
- Genus: Ptilotus
- Species: P. conicus

Binomial name
- Ptilotus conicus R.Br.

Synonyms
- Ptilotus amabilis Span. nom. inval., nom. nud.; Ptilotus conicus R.Br. var. conicus; Ptilotus conicus var. timorensis Engl.; Trichinium conicum (R.Br.) Spreng.

Species of herb

Ptilotus conicus is a species of flowering plant in the family Amaranthaceae and is native to northern Australia, New Guinea and Indonesia. It is an erect annual herb, with narrowly linear leaves on the stems, and cylindrical spikes of pink, magenta or red flowers with five stamens.

== Description ==
Ptilotus conicus is an erect annual herb that typically grows up to 10–70 cm (3.9–27.6 in) high, and has glabrous stems and leaves. The leaves on the stems are narrowly elliptic, 4–75 mm (0.16–2.95 in) long and 0.5–10 mm (0.020–0.394 in) wide, but absent from the base of the plant. The flowers are pink, magenta or red, borne in oval or cylindrical heads 7–30 mm (0.28–1.18 in) long and 10–20 mm (0.39–0.79 in) wide. There are bracts 2.3–4.6 mm (0.091–0.181 in) long with a prominent midrib, and similar bracteoles mostly 3–4.5 mm (0.12–0.18 in) long, at the base of the flowers. The outer tepals are mostly 5.5–7.5 mm (0.22–0.30 in) long and the inner tepals have similar dimensions and with a tuft of hairs on the inner surface. There are five stamens and the style is curved or straight, 2.5–3.2 mm (0.098–0.126 in) long. Flowering occurs from January to June and the seeds are 1.4–1.5 mm (0.055–0.059 in) long and glossy black.

This species is similar to both P. corymbosus and P. spicatus.

== Taxonomy ==
Ptilotus conicus was first formally described in 1810 by Robert Brown in his Prodromus Florae Novae Hollandiae. The specific epithet (conicus) means 'conical'.

== Distribution and habitat ==
This species of Ptilotus grows on rocky outcrops, in coastal areas and sandstone plateaux in the Dampierland and Northern Kimberley bioregions of northern Western Australia, the northern parts of the Northern Territory, and also in New Guinea, the Lesser Sunda and Maluku Islands in Indonesia.

== Conservation status ==
Ptilotus conicus is listed as "not threatened" by the Government of Western Australia Department of Biodiversity, Conservation and Attractions, and as of "least concern" under the Northern Territory Parks and Wildlife Conservation Act.

== See also ==
- List of Ptilotus species
