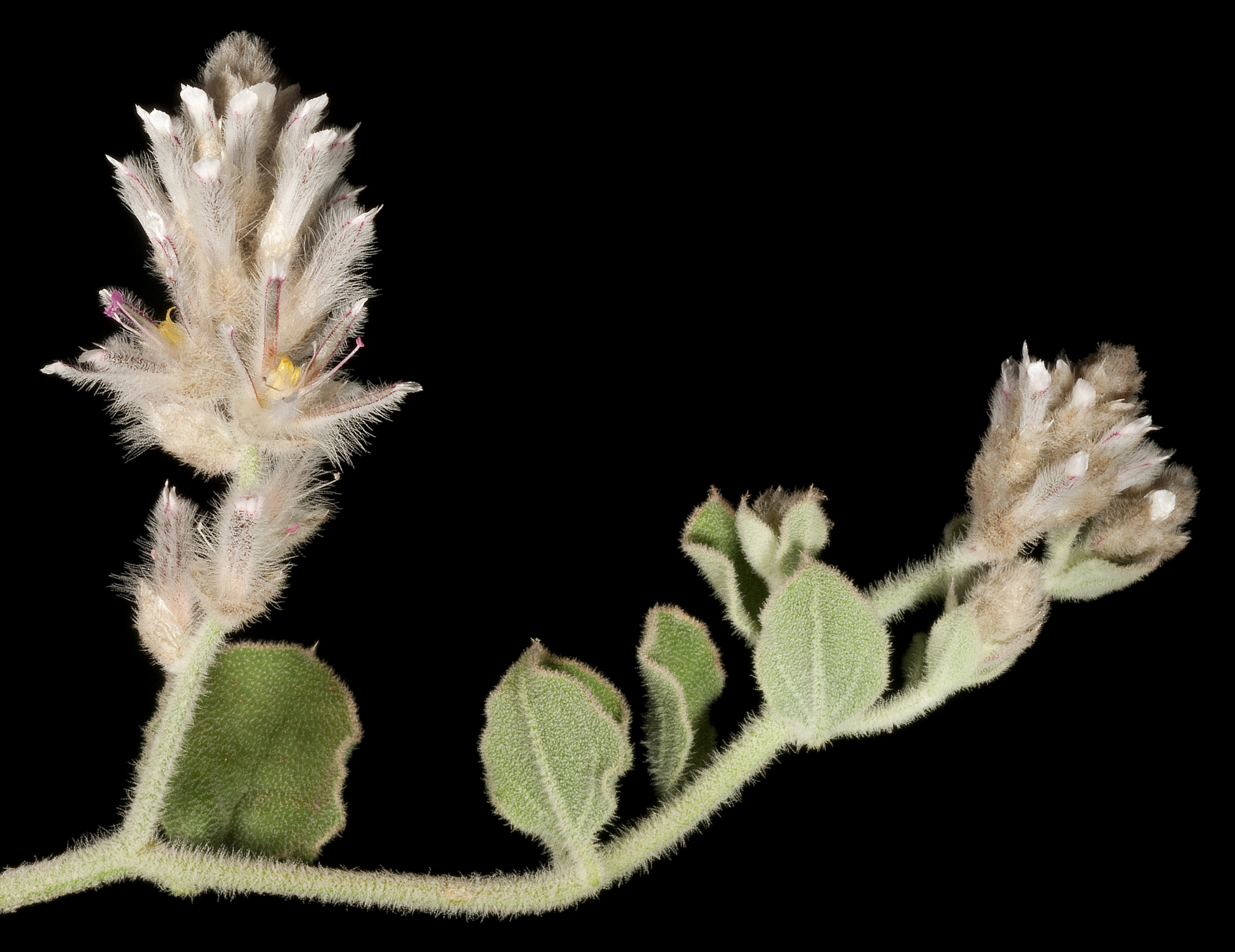

Scientific classification
- Kingdom: Plantae
- Clade: Tracheophytes
- Clade: Angiosperms
- Clade: Eudicots
- Order: Caryophyllales
- Family: Amaranthaceae
- Genus: Ptilotus
- Species: P. appendiculatus

Binomial name
- Ptilotus appendiculatus Benl

Synonyms
- Ptilotus appendiculatus Benl var. appendiculatus; Ptilotus appendiculatus var. minor Benl

= Ptilotus appendiculatus =

Species of grass-like plant

Ptilotus appendiculatus is a species of flowering plant in the family Amaranthaceae and is endemic to the north of Western Australia. It is a prostrate perennial herb with egg-shaped leaves and spikes of pink flowers.

== Description ==
Ptilotus appendiculatus is a prostrate perennial herb that typically grows up to 4–15 cm (1.6–5.9 in) high. Its leaves are egg-shaped, 7–100 mm (0.28–3.94 in) long, 3–25 mm (0.12–0.98 in) wide and hairy. The flowers are borne in oval or cylindrical spikes 10–35 mm (0.39–1.38 in) long and 12–33 mm (0.47–1.30 in) wide, the flowers densely clustered. There are hairy bracts 4.0–5.5 mm (0.16–0.22 in) long and hairy bracteoles mostly 5.3–7.7 mm (0.21–0.30 in) long with a prominent midrib. The tepals are pink, the outer tepals 11.3–13.4 mm (0.44–0.53 in) long and the inner tepals 10.8–12.7 mm (0.43–0.50 in) long. There are two fertile stamens and three staminodes, the ovary is hairy and the style is 2.5–4.5 mm (0.098–0.177 in) long. Flowering occurs in July and August.

== Taxonomy ==
Ptilotus appendiculatus was first formally described in 1959 by Gerhard Benl in the journal Muelleria from specimens collected on Globe Hill Station in 1905. The specific epithet (appendiculatus) means 'appendiculate', referring to the tips of the tepals.

== Distribution ==
This species of Ptilotus grows in the Carnarvon, Gascoyne and Pilbara bioregions of northern Western Australia.

== Conservation status ==
Ptilotus appendiculatus is listed as "not threatened" by the Government of Western Australia Department of Biodiversity, Conservation and Attractions.

== Gallery ==
Ptilotus appendiculatus

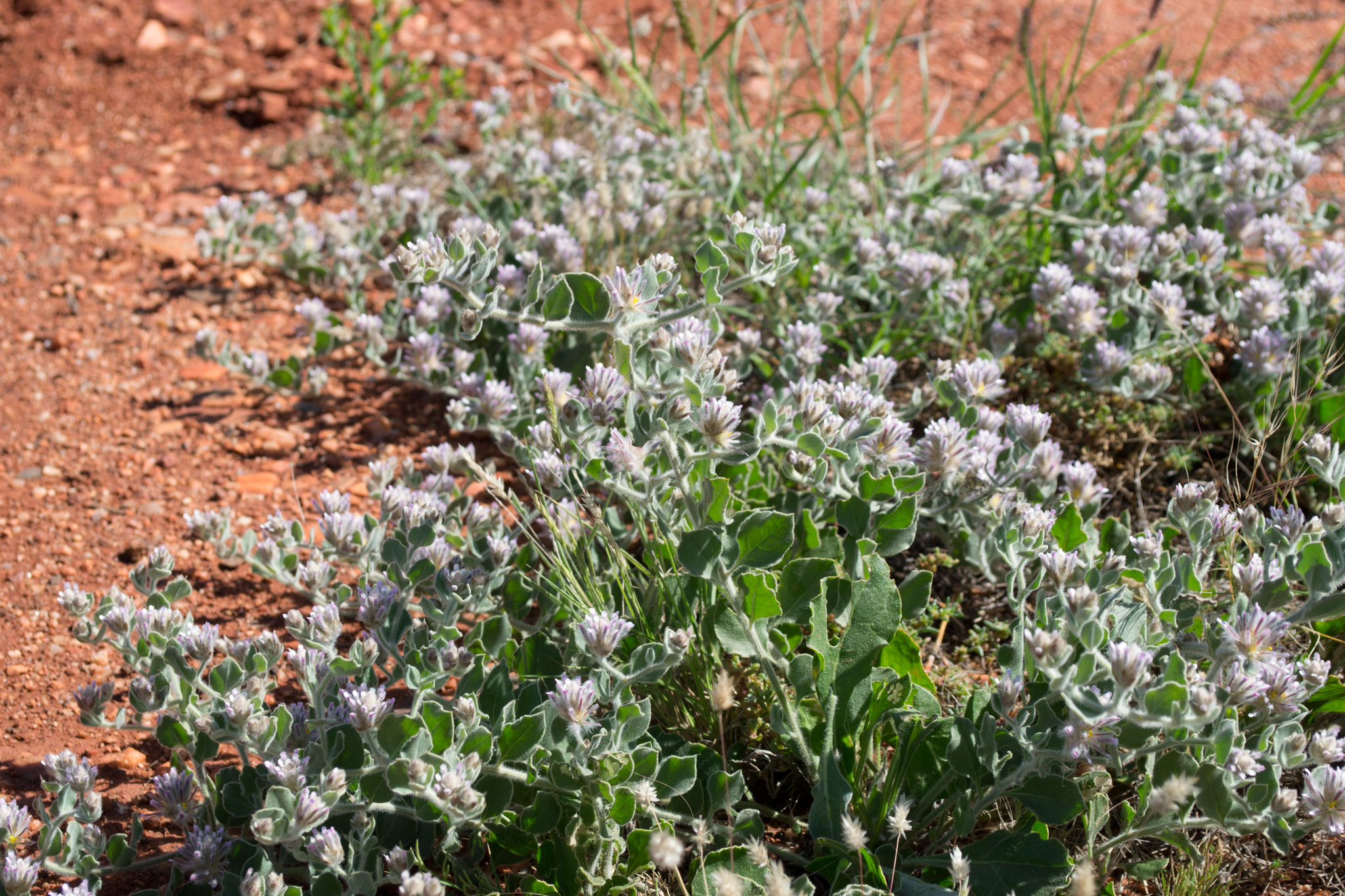

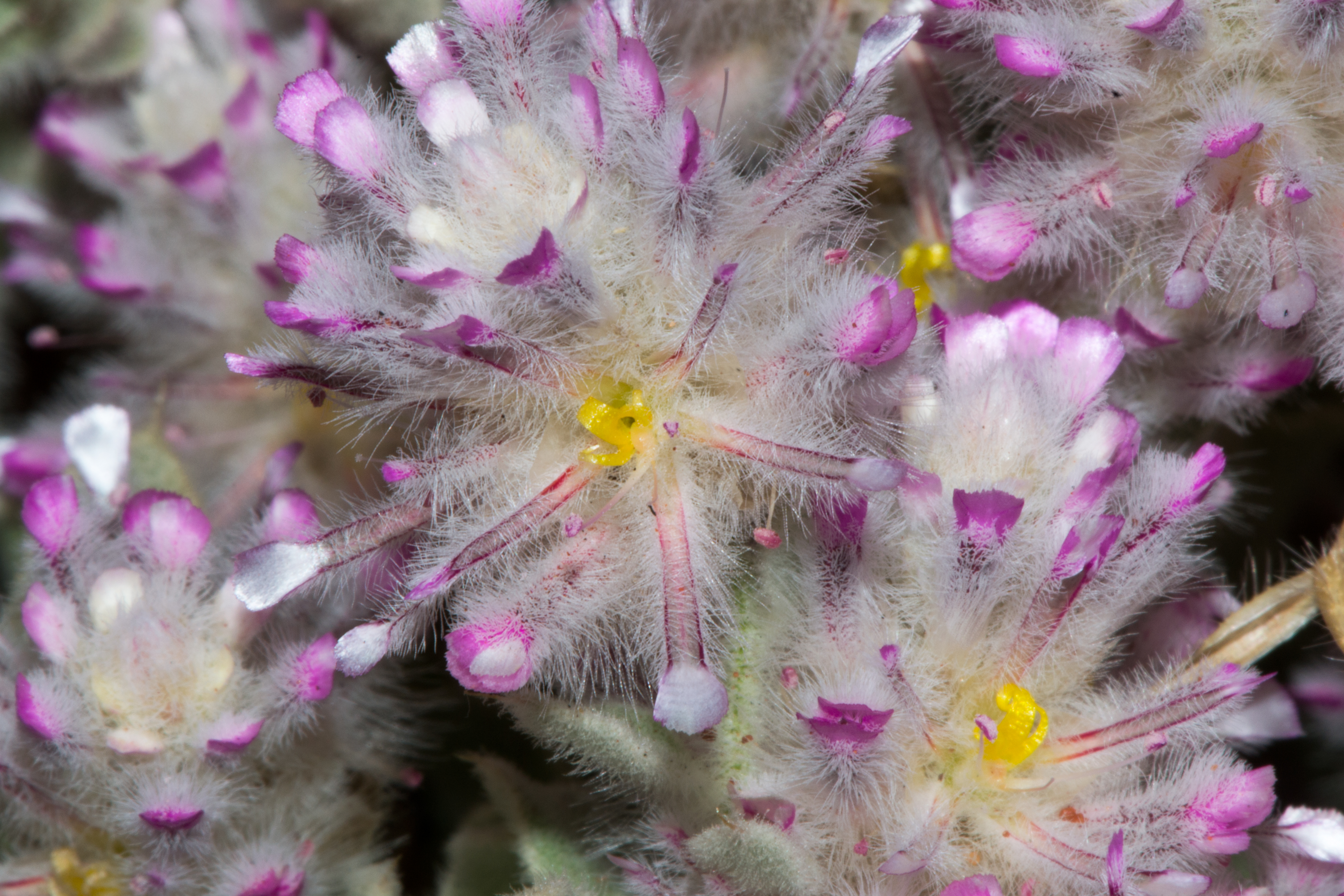

== See also ==
- List of Ptilotus species
