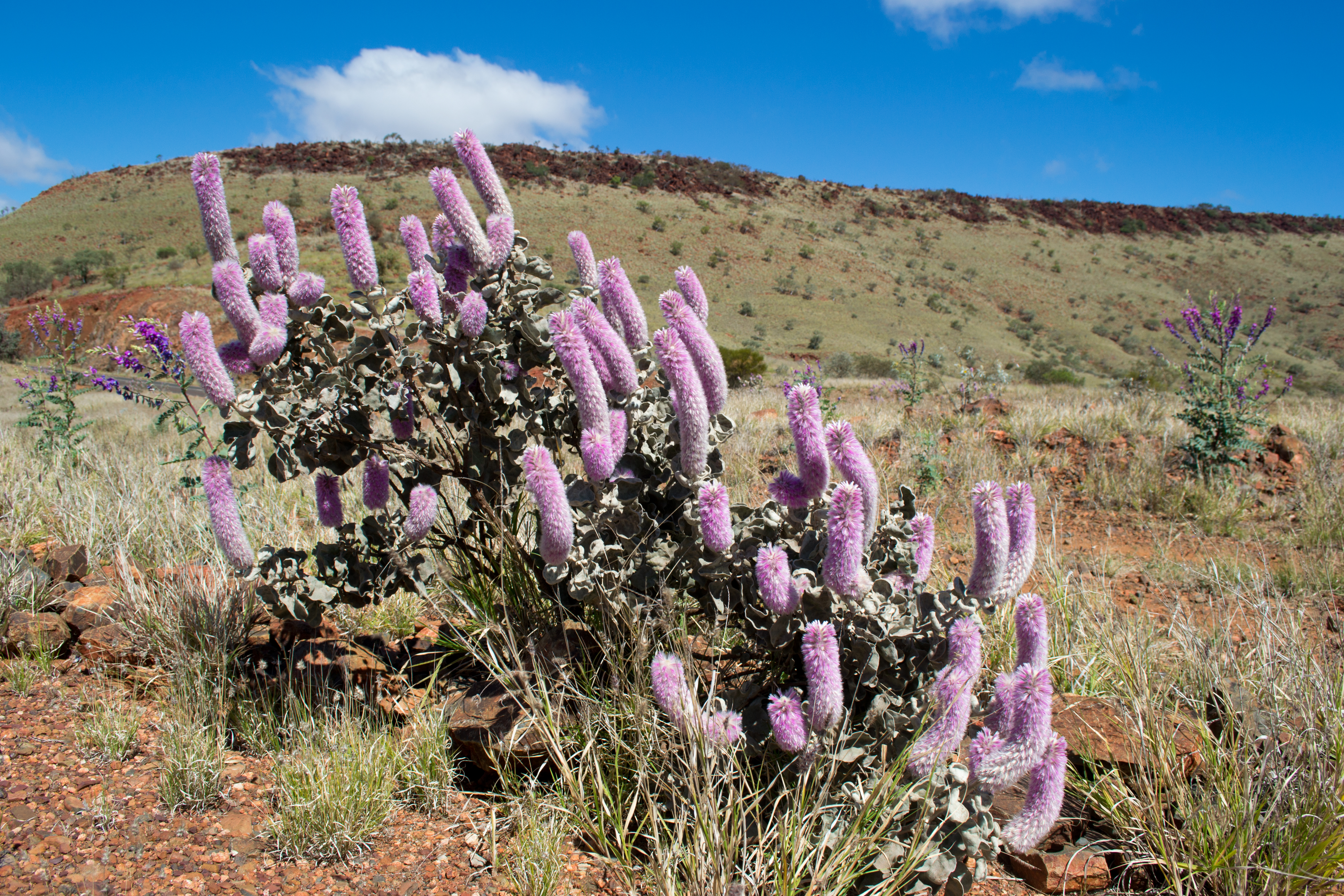
- Near Tom Price
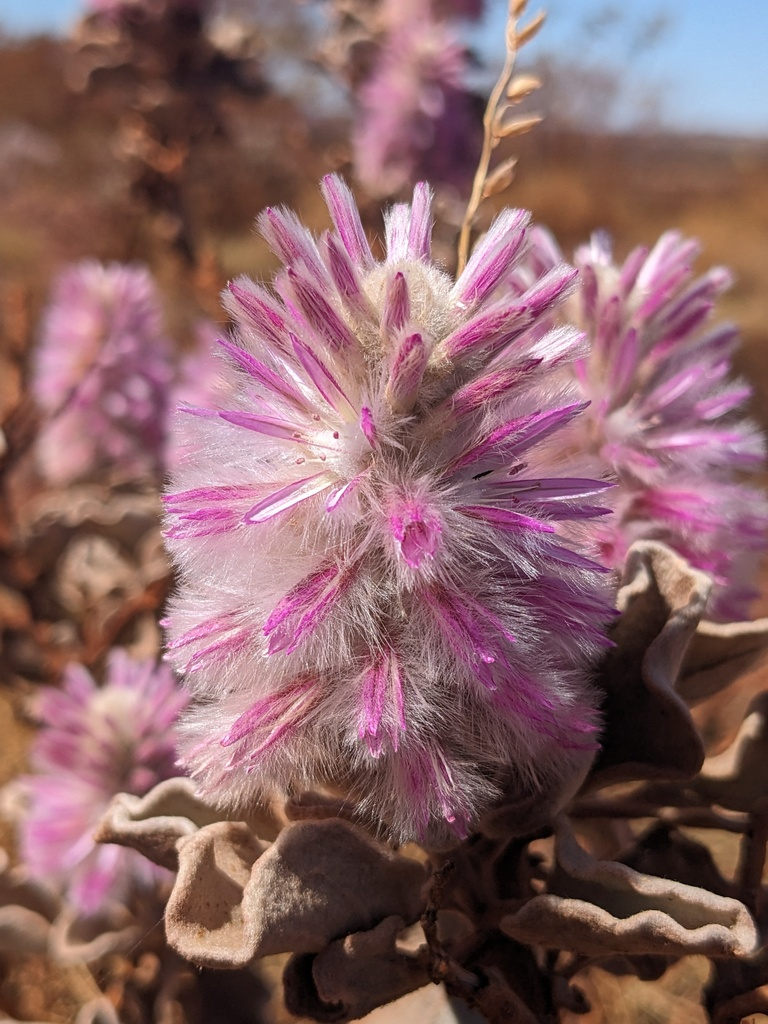
- Flower spike

Scientific classification
- Kingdom: Plantae
- Clade: Embryophytes
- Clade: Tracheophytes
- Clade: Spermatophytes
- Clade: Angiosperms
- Clade: Eudicots
- Order: Caryophyllales
- Family: Amaranthaceae
- Genus: Ptilotus
- Species: P. rotundifolius

Binomial name
- Ptilotus rotundifolius (F.Muell.) F.Muell.

= Ptilotus rotundifolius =

Species of plant

Ptilotus rotundifolius, commonly known as royal mulla mulla, is a species of flowering plant of the family Amaranthaceae and is endemic to the north-west of Western Australia. It is a shrub with hairy stem leaves and spikes of pink flowers.

== Description ==
Ptilotus rotundifolius is a shrub that typically grows to a height of 0.4–2 m (1 ft 4 in – 6 ft 7 in), its stems erect and covered with weak hairs. The stem leaves are arranged alternately, 12–75 mm (0.47–2.95 in) long and 9–70 mm (0.35–2.76 in) wide. The flowers are borne in pink or purple, oval or cylindrical spikes, with hairy, coloured bracts 3–6.5 mm (0.12–0.26 in) long and colourless bracteoles 7–8.5 mm (0.28–0.33 in) long. The outer tepals are 15.3–19 mm (0.60–0.75 in) long, the inner tepals 15–18.5 mm (0.59–0.73 in) long. The style is straight, 7–9 mm (0.28–0.35 in) long and fixed to the centre of the ovary.

== Taxonomy ==
This species was first formally described in 1862 by Ferdinand von Mueller, who gave it the name Trichinium rotundifolium in the his Fragmenta Phytographiae Australiae from specimens collected on rocky hills near the Hammersley Range by Maitland Brown. In a later volume of the same book, Mueller transferred the species to Ptilotus as P. rotundifolius. The specific epithet (rotundifolius) means 'round leaved'.

== Distribution and habitat ==
This species of Ptilotus grows in stony soils on rocky hills and rises in the Carnarvon, Gascoyne, Little Sandy Desert, Murchison and Pilbara bioregions of north western Western Australia.

== Conservation status ==
Ptilotus rotundifolius is listed as 'not threatened' by the Western Australian Government Department of Biodiversity, Conservation and Attractions.
