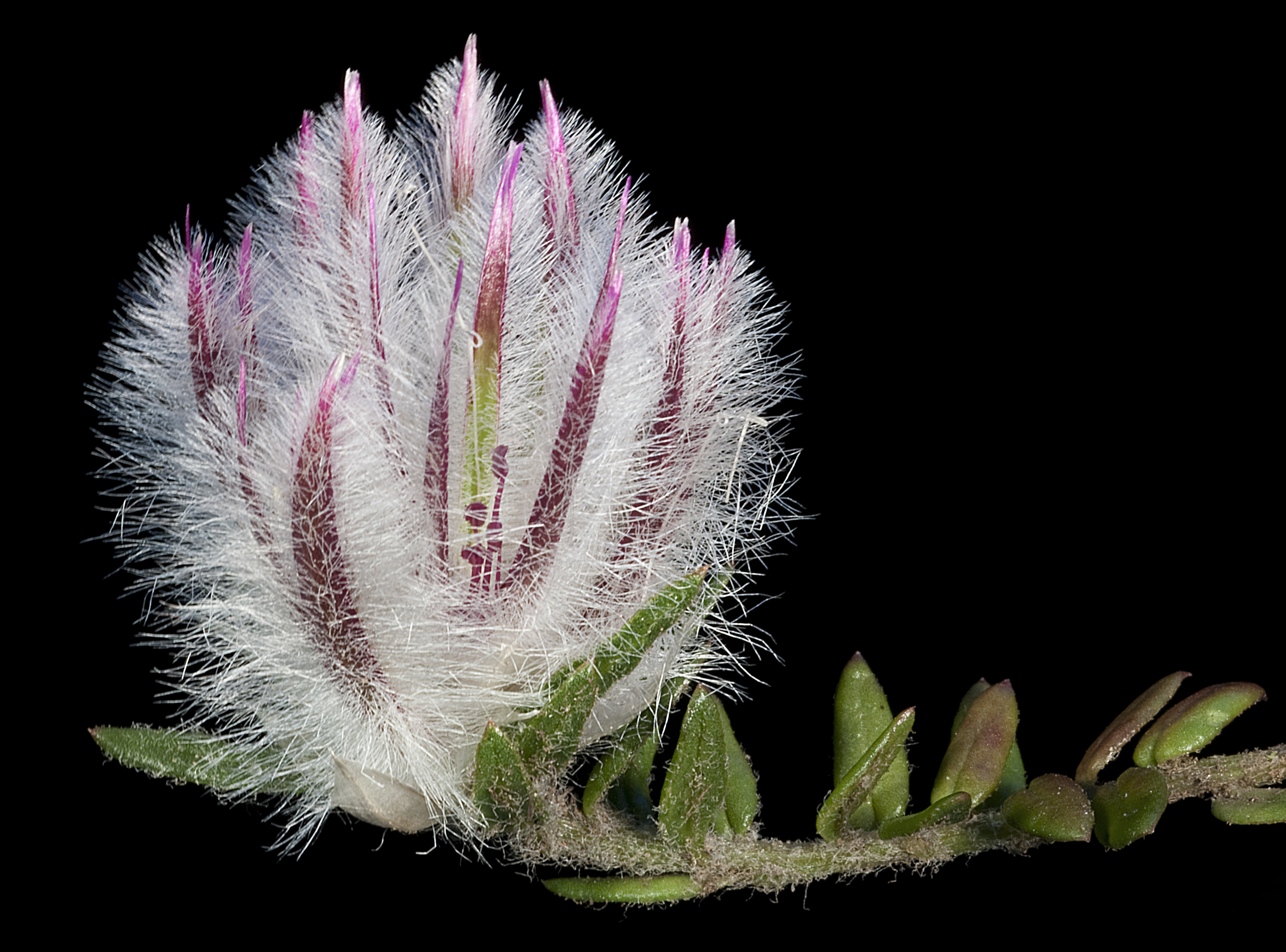
- Near Chittering

Scientific classification
- Kingdom: Plantae
- Clade: Tracheophytes
- Clade: Angiosperms
- Clade: Eudicots
- Order: Caryophyllales
- Family: Amaranthaceae
- Genus: Ptilotus
- Species: P. declinatus

Binomial name
- Ptilotus declinatus Nees

Synonyms
- Trichinium declinatum (Nees) Moq.; Trichinium eriocephalum Moq.

= Ptilotus declinatus =

Species of grass-like plant

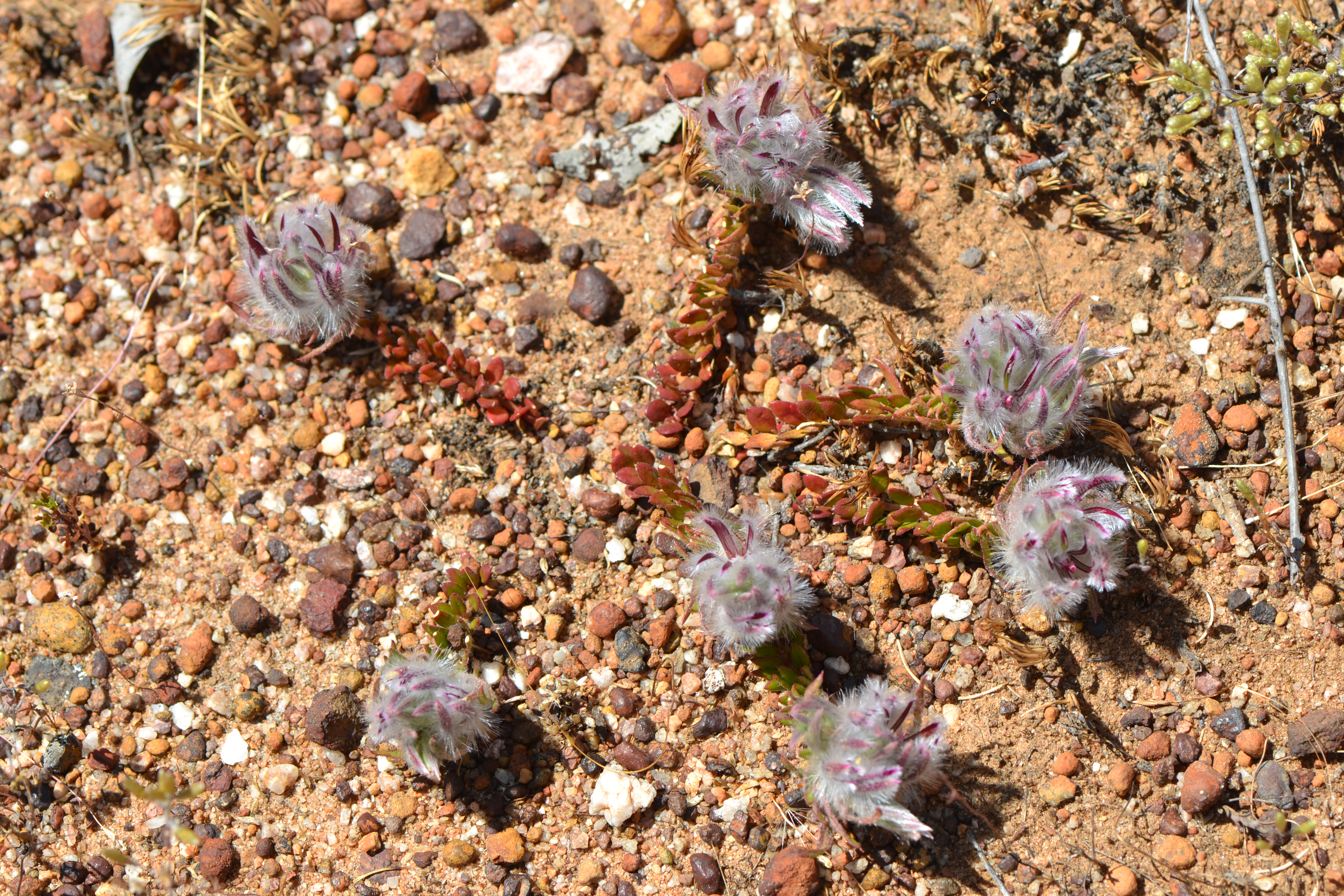
Habit near Bindoon

Ptilotus declinatus, commonly known as curved mulla mulla, is a species of flowering plant in the family Amaranthaceae and is endemic to the south-west of Western Australia. It is a prostrate or ascending perennial herb, with leaves at the base of the plant and stem leaves that are hairy at first, later glabrous, and oval, hemispherical or spherical spikes of pink or magenta flowers.

== Description ==
Ptilotus declinatus is a prostrate or ascending perennial herb that typically grows to a height of 3–20 cm (1.2–7.9 in) tall, its stems hairy at first, later glabrous. The leaves are arranged in rosettes at the base of the plant and on the stems, 3–55 mm (0.12–2.17 in) long and 1–5 mm (0.039–0.197 in) wide. The flowers are arranged in dense oval, hemispherical or cylindrical spikes with bracts 7.5 mm (0.30 in) long and bracteoles 6.5–10.4 mm (0.26–0.41 in) long at the base. The outer tepals are 15–20 mm (0.59–0.79 in) long, the inner tepals 14–19 mm (0.55–0.75 in) long. The style is 1.2 mm (0.047 in) long. Flowering occurs from September to December and the seeds are glossy brown, 1.6–1.8 mm (0.063–0.071 in) long.

== Taxonomy ==
Ptilotus declinatus was first formally described in 1845 by Nees von Esenbeck in Lehmann's book Plantae Preissianae. The specific epithet (declinatus) means 'bent', or 'turned aside'.

== Distribution ==
Ptilotus declinatus is found in the Geraldton Sandplains, Swan Coastal Plain, Avon Wheatbelt and Jarrah Forest bioregions of south-western Western Australia.

== Conservation status ==
This species of Ptilotus is listed as "not threatened" by the Government of Western Australia Department of Biodiversity, Conservation and Attractions.

== Gallery ==
Ptilotus declinatus

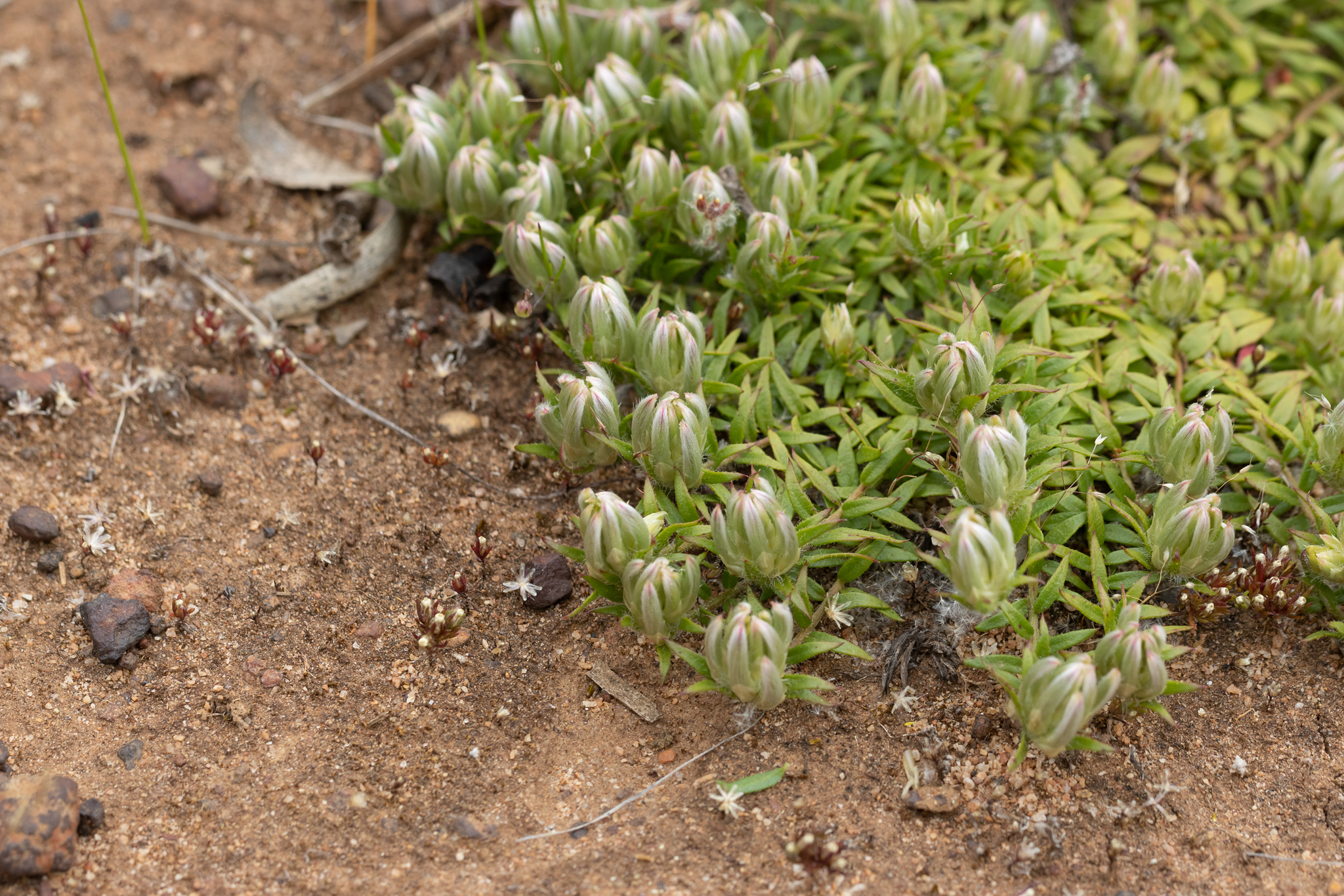
In Dryandra Woodland National Park, Western Australia

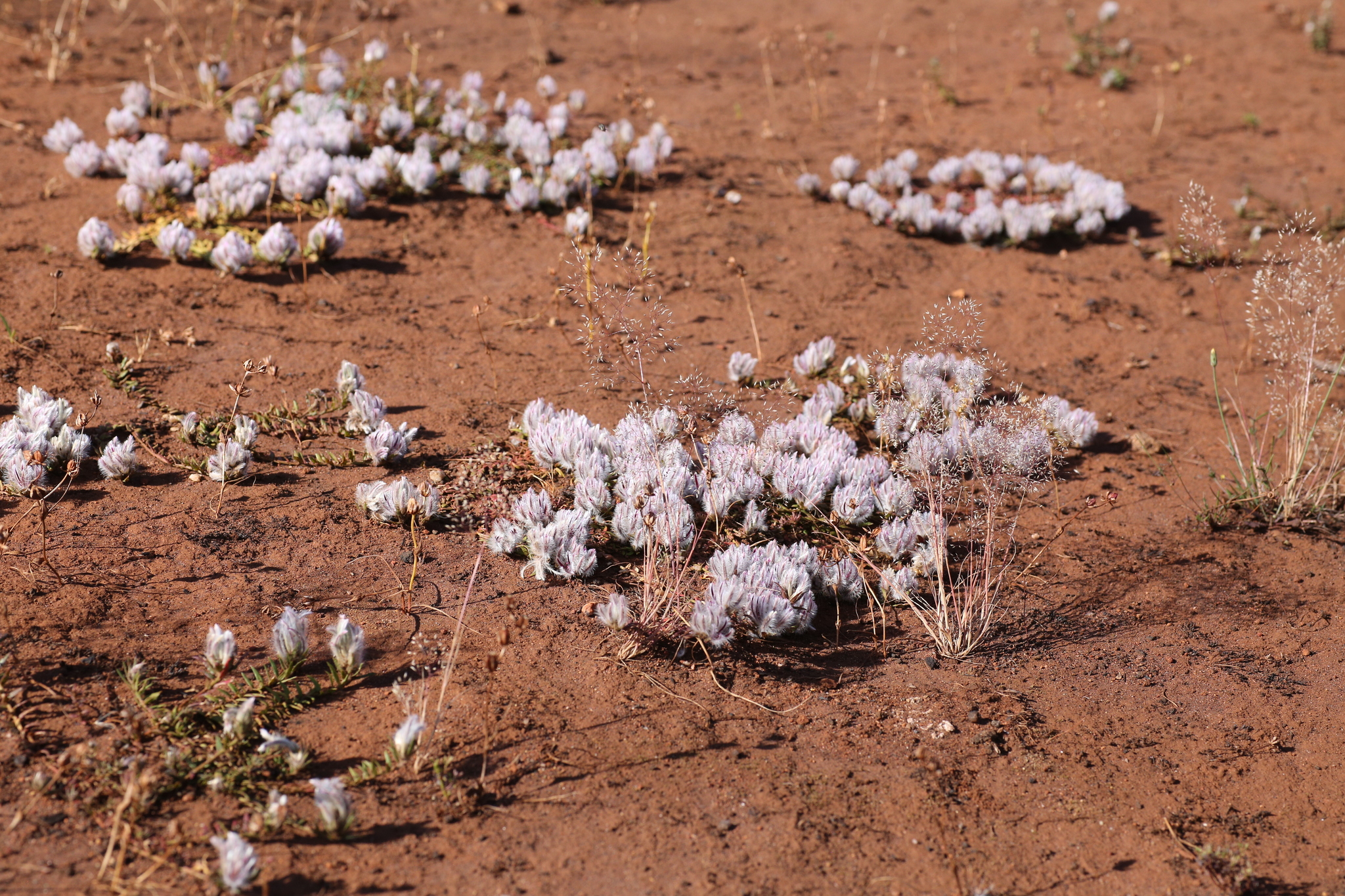
Near Gidgegannup, Western Australia.

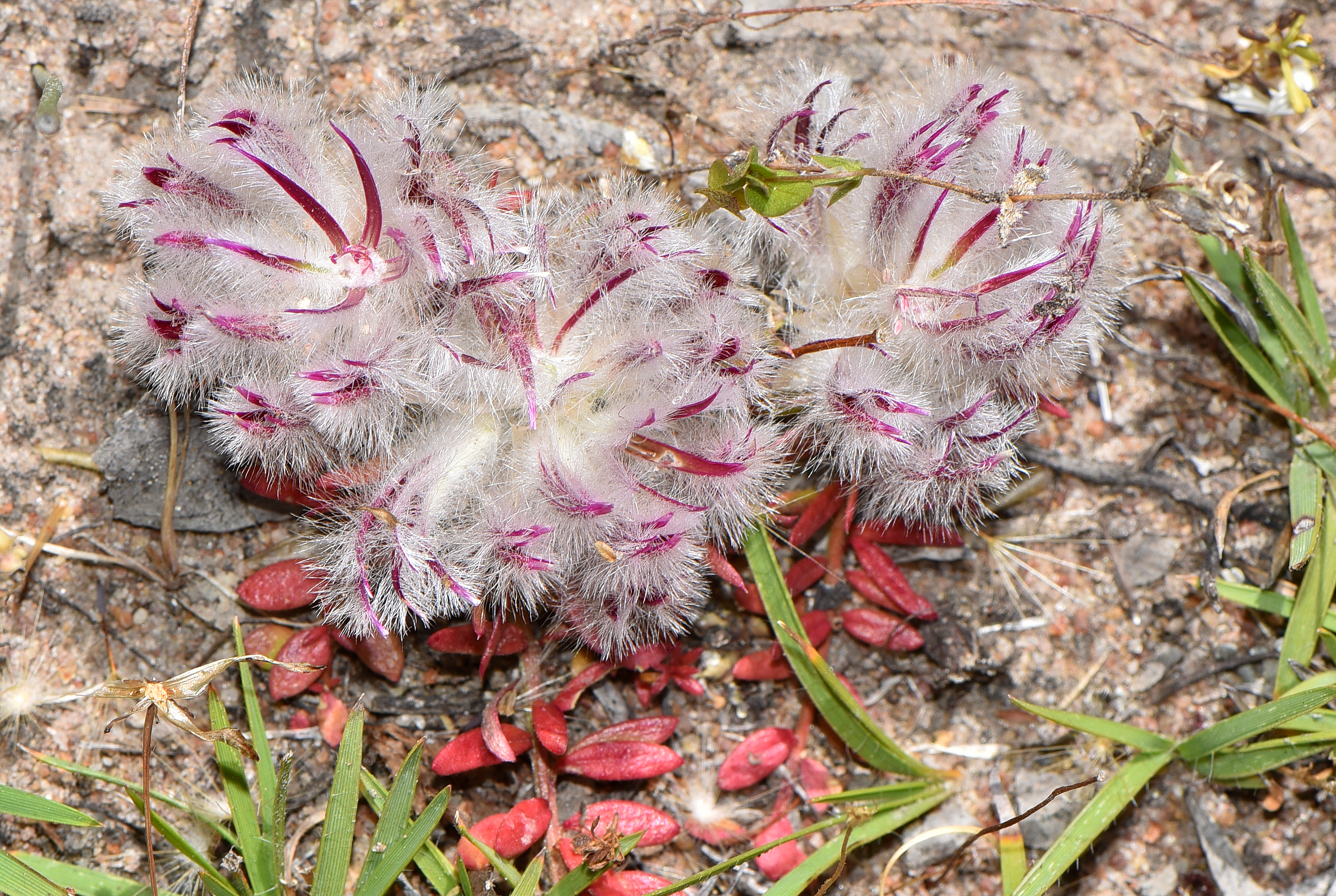

== See also ==
- List of Ptilotus species
