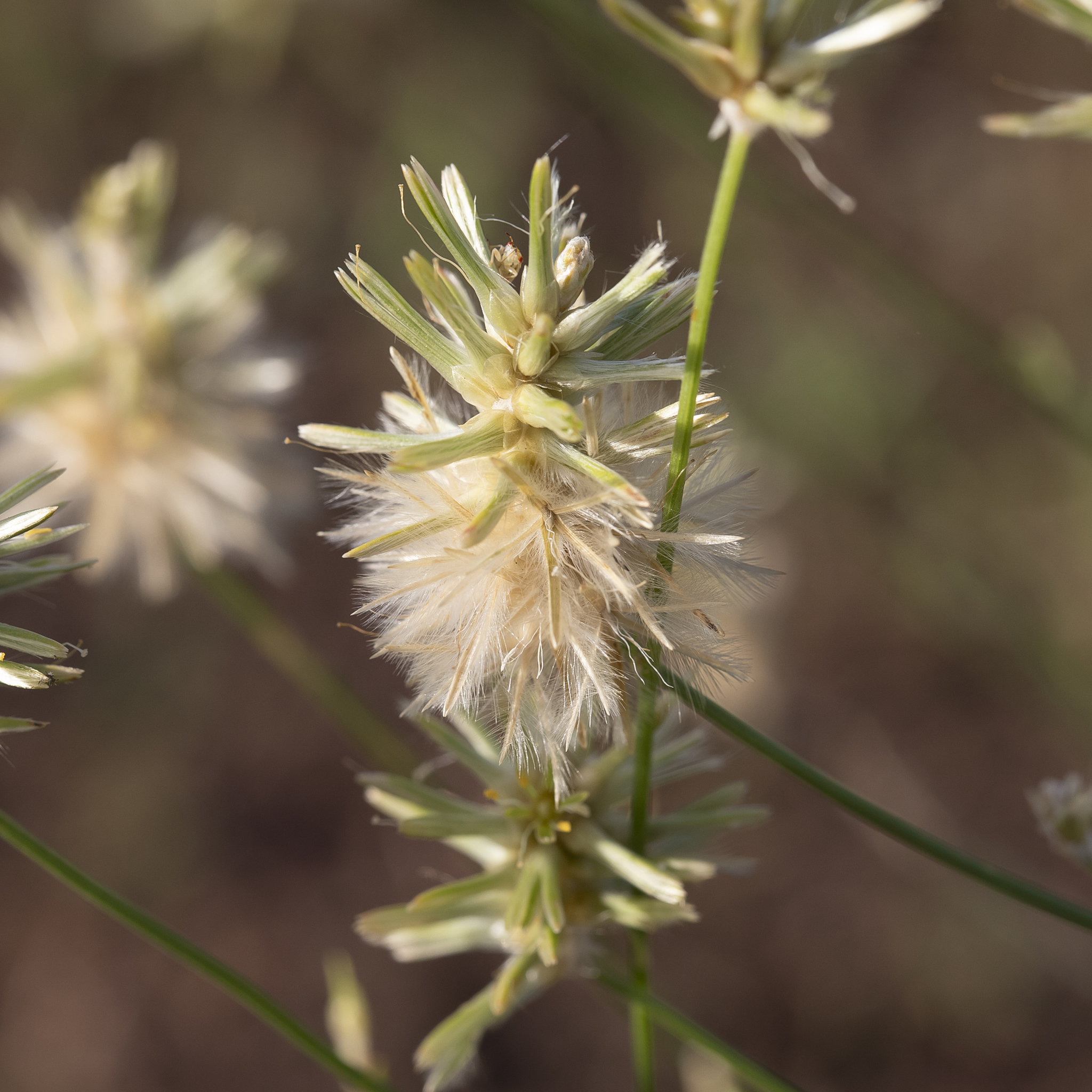
- In Daly Waters

Scientific classification
- Kingdom: Plantae
- Clade: Tracheophytes
- Clade: Angiosperms
- Clade: Eudicots
- Order: Caryophyllales
- Family: Amaranthaceae
- Genus: Ptilotus
- Species: P. fusiformis

Binomial name
- Ptilotus fusiformis (R.Br.) Poir.

Synonyms
- List: Ptilotus fusiformis (R.Br.) Poir. var. fusiformis; Ptilotus fusiformis var. gracilis (R.Br.) Benl; Ptilotus gracilis (R.Br.) Poir.; Trichinium fusiforme R.Br.; Trichinium fusiforme R.Br. var. fusiforme; Trichinium fusiforme var. gracile (R.Br.) Domin; Trichinium fusiforme var. typicum Domin nom. inval.; Trichinium gracile R.Br.

= Ptilotus fusiformis =

Species of grass-like plant

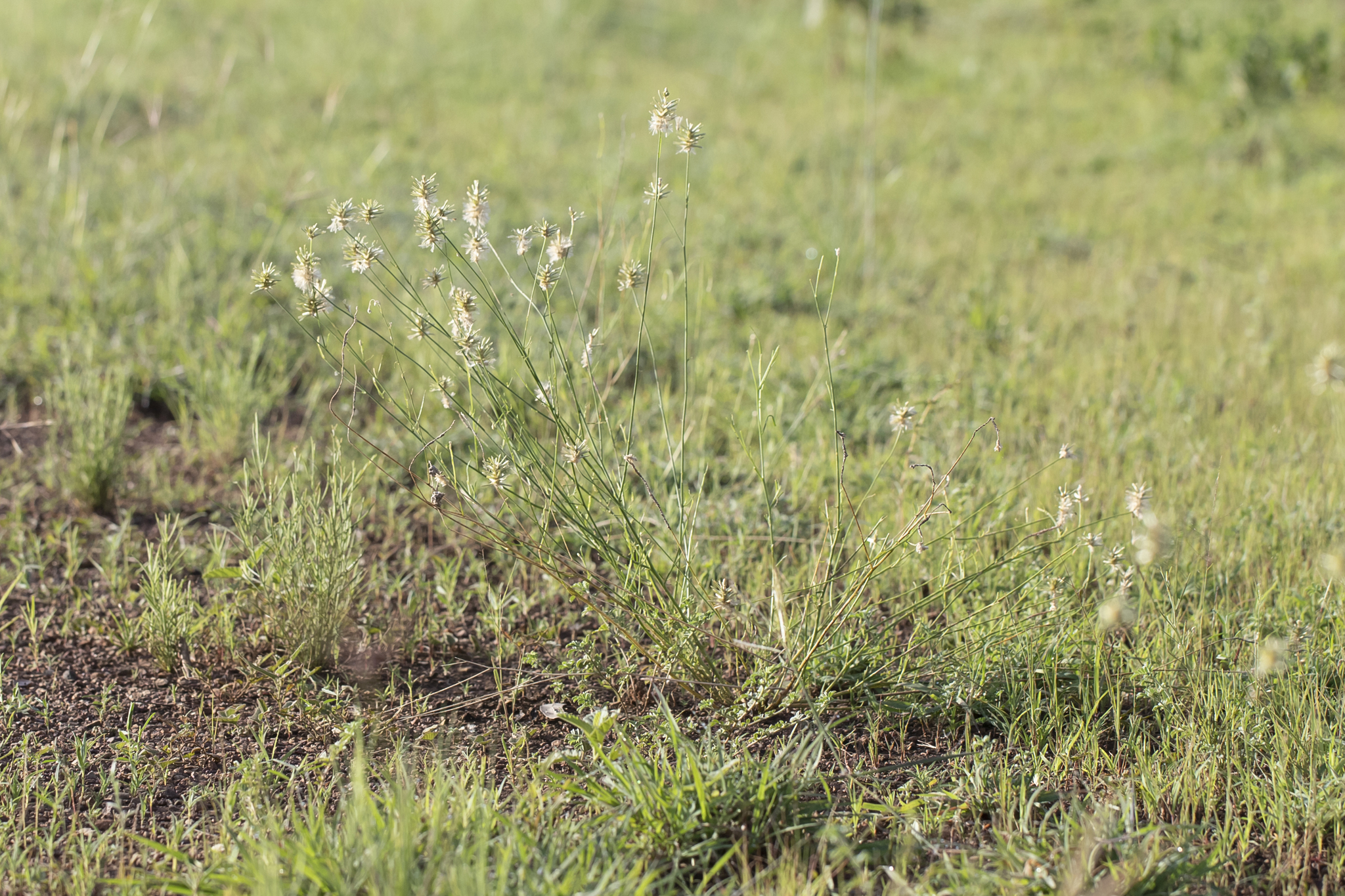
Habit

Ptilotus fusiformis, commonly known as skeleton plant or pom-pom bottlebrush, is a species of flowering plant in the family Amaranthaceae and is endemic to northern Australia. It is an erect to spreading annual or perennial herb, with linear leaves and cylindrical green or yellow spikes of densely arranged flowers.

== Description ==
Ptilotus fusiformis is an erect or spreading annual or perennial herb that typically grows to a height of up to 30–60 cm (12–24 in). Its leaves are linear, mostly 10–60 mm (0.39–2.36 in) long and 0.3–0.8 mm (0.012–0.031 in) wide. The flowers are usually arranged in solitary cylindrical spikes 35–50 mm (1.4–2.0 in) long and 15–30 mm (0.59–1.18 in) wide on a long, slender pedicel, with transparent, straw-coloured, glabrous, egg-shaped bracts and bracteoles about 1.5 mm (0.059 in) long. The tepals are linear, 6–12 mm (0.24–0.47 in) long, greenish yellow and covered with long divided hairs. The style is 4.5–5.0 mm (0.18–0.20 in) long fixed to the side of the ovary. Flowering occurs from January to November and the seeds are 1.3–1.5 mm (0.051–0.059 in) long.

== Taxonomy ==
This species was first formally described in 1810 by Robert Brown who gave it the name Trichinium fusiforme in his Prodromus Florae Novae Hollandiae et Insulae Van Diemen. In 1816, Poiret transferred the species to Ptilotus as P. fusiformis in a supplement to the Encyclopédie Méthodique. The specific epithet (fusiformis) means 'spindle-shaped', referring to the root.

== Distribution and habitat ==
Ptilotus fusiformis occurs across northern Australia and is widespread in northern Western Australia, the Northern Territory, and to around Collinsville in Queensland and grows in a wide range of sites in sandy or loamy soils.

== Conservation status ==
This species of Ptilotus is listed as "not threatened" by the Government of Western Australia Department of Biodiversity, Conservation and Attractions, and as of "least concern" under the Territory Parks and Wildlife Conservation Act and the Queensland Government Nature Conservation Act 1992.

== See also ==
- List of Ptilotus species
