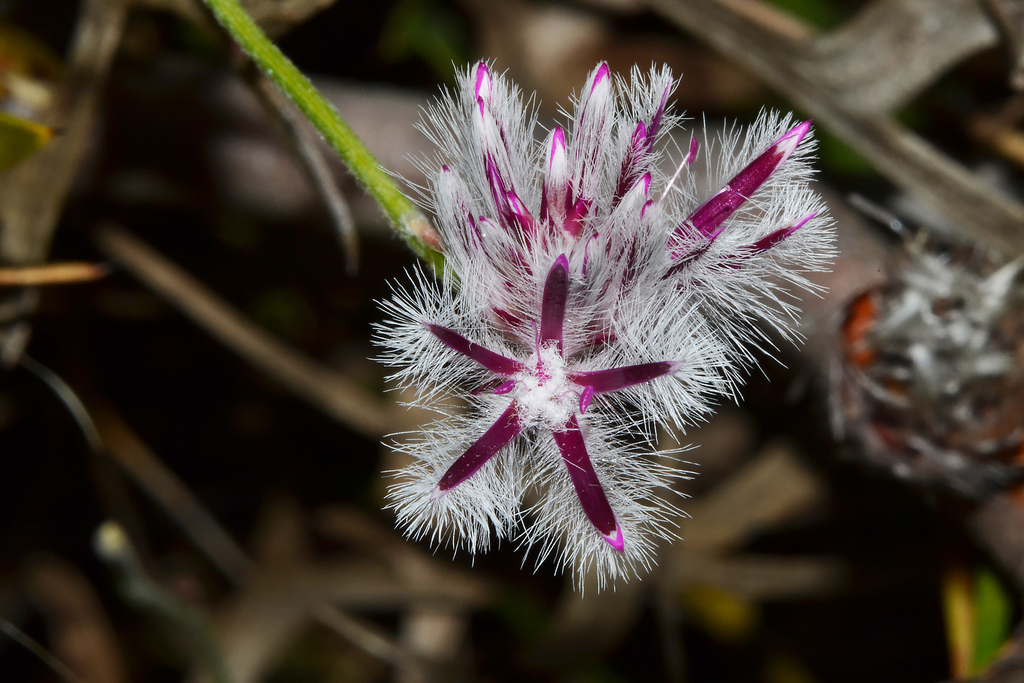
- Subspecies stirlingii near Yanchep

Scientific classification
- Kingdom: Plantae
- Clade: Embryophytes
- Clade: Tracheophytes
- Clade: Spermatophytes
- Clade: Angiosperms
- Clade: Eudicots
- Order: Caryophyllales
- Family: Amaranthaceae
- Genus: Ptilotus
- Species: P. stirlingii

Binomial name
- Ptilotus stirlingii (Lindl.) F.Muell.

Synonyms
- Ptilotus polystachyus (Gaudich.) F.Muell. p.p.; Ptilotus stirlingi F.Muell. orth. var.; Trichinium carneum Moq.; Trichinium stirlingii Lindl.

= Ptilotus stirlingii =

Species of plant

Ptilotus stirlingii, commonly known as Stirling's mulla mulla, is a species of flowering plant of the family Amaranthaceae and is endemic to the south-west of Western Australia. It is a low-lying or ascending perennial herb that typically grows to a height of up to 30 cm (12 in) and has heads of silvery flowers tinged with pink.

This species was first formally described in 1839 by John Lindley who gave it the name Trichinium stirlingii in the Edwards's botanical register from specimens collected in the Swan River Colony. In 1883, Ferdinand von Mueller transferred the species to Ptilotus as P. stirlingii in his Systematic Census of Australian Plants. The specific epithet (stirlingii) honours James Stirling, the first governor of Western Australia.

Ptilotus stipitatus is listed as 'not threatened' by the Government of Western Australia Department of Biodiversity, Conservation and Attractions.
