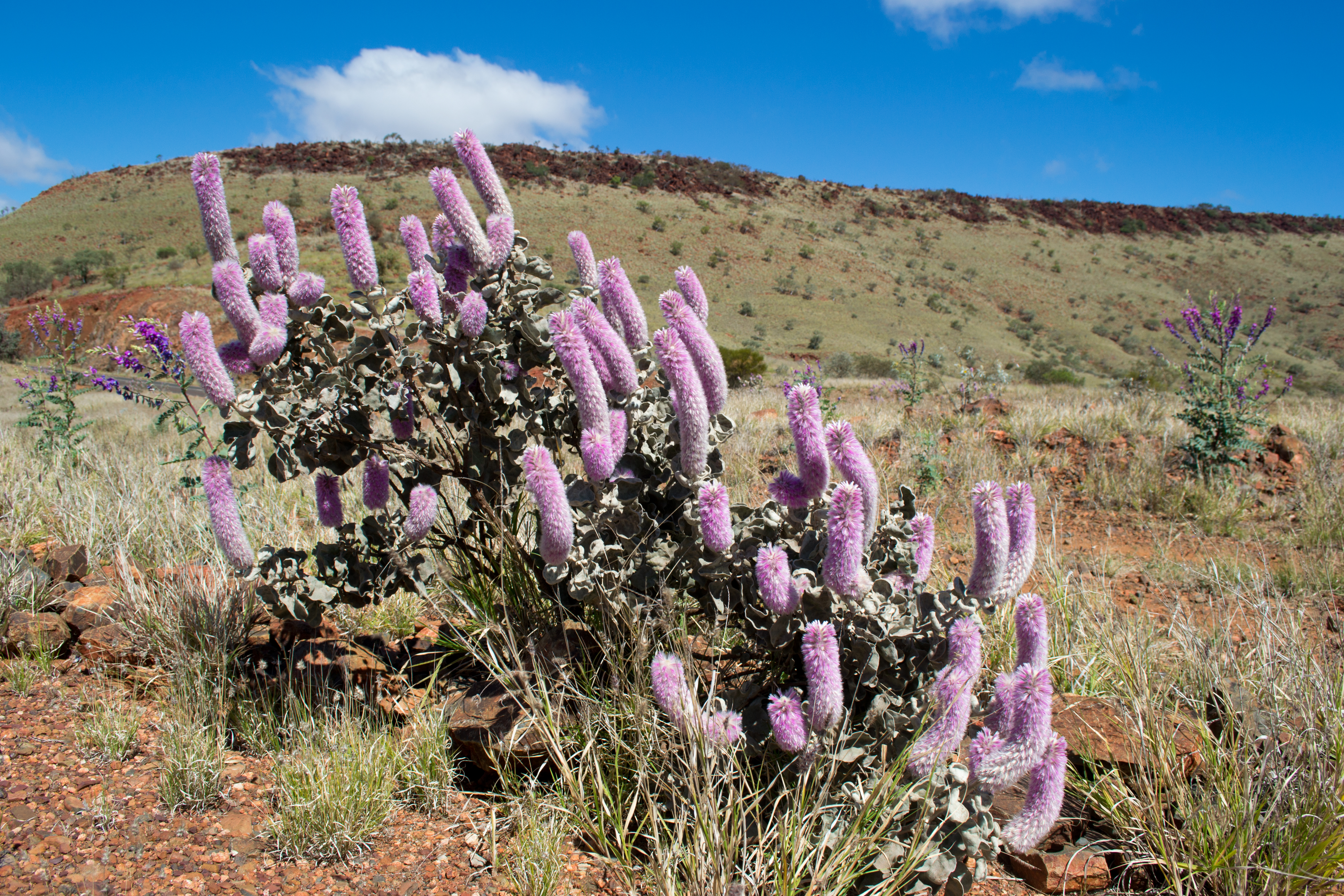
- Ptilotus rotundifolius

Scientific classification
- Kingdom: Plantae
- Clade: Embryophytes
- Clade: Tracheophytes
- Clade: Spermatophytes
- Clade: Angiosperms
- Clade: Eudicots
- Order: Caryophyllales
- Family: Amaranthaceae
- Subfamily: Amaranthoideae
- Genus: Ptilotus; R.Br.

Species
- 125; see List of Ptilotus species

Synonyms
- Arthrotrichum F.Muell. (1863), not validly publ.; Dipteranthemum F.Muell. (1884); Gomotriche Turcz. (1849); Goniotriche Turcz. (1852); Hemisteirus F.Muell. (1853); Kelita A.R.Bean (2010); Trichinium R.Br. (1810)

= Ptilotus =

Family of shrubs

Ptilotus is a genus of approximately 125 species of flowering plants in the family Amaranthaceae, and is endemic to Australia, apart from Ptilotus conicus that also occurs in Malesia. Plants in the genus Ptilotus are annual or perennial herbs or shrubs with usually hairy spikes of compact spherical, oval or cylindrical flowers.

== Description ==
Plants in the genus Ptilotus are annual or perennial herbs or small shrubs, many covered with soft hairs. The leaves are arranged alternately, sometimes on branches and/or in a rosette at the base. The flowers are bisexual and borne in compact spherical to oval or cylindrical spikes, each flower with a membranous bract and two bracteoles at the base. There are five, equal, hairy, linear tepals and five stamens, sometimes up to three stamens reduced to sterile staminodes, fused into a cap surrounding the ovary. The fruit is a nut or utricle, surrounded by the remains of the perianth.

== Taxonomy ==
The genus Ptilotus was first formally described in 1810 by Robert Brown in his Prodromus Florae Novae Hollandiae. The genus name means 'winged', particularly 'soft winged'.

In family-level phylogenetic studies, Ptilotus has been placed within a clade informally known as the 'aervoids'. It has been resolved as monophyletic and is closely related to Aerva Forssk.

== Distribution ==
Most species of Ptilotus occur in arid parts of Western Australia, but there are species in the Northern Territory, Queensland, South Australia, New South Wales, Victoria and Tasmania.

== Gallery ==
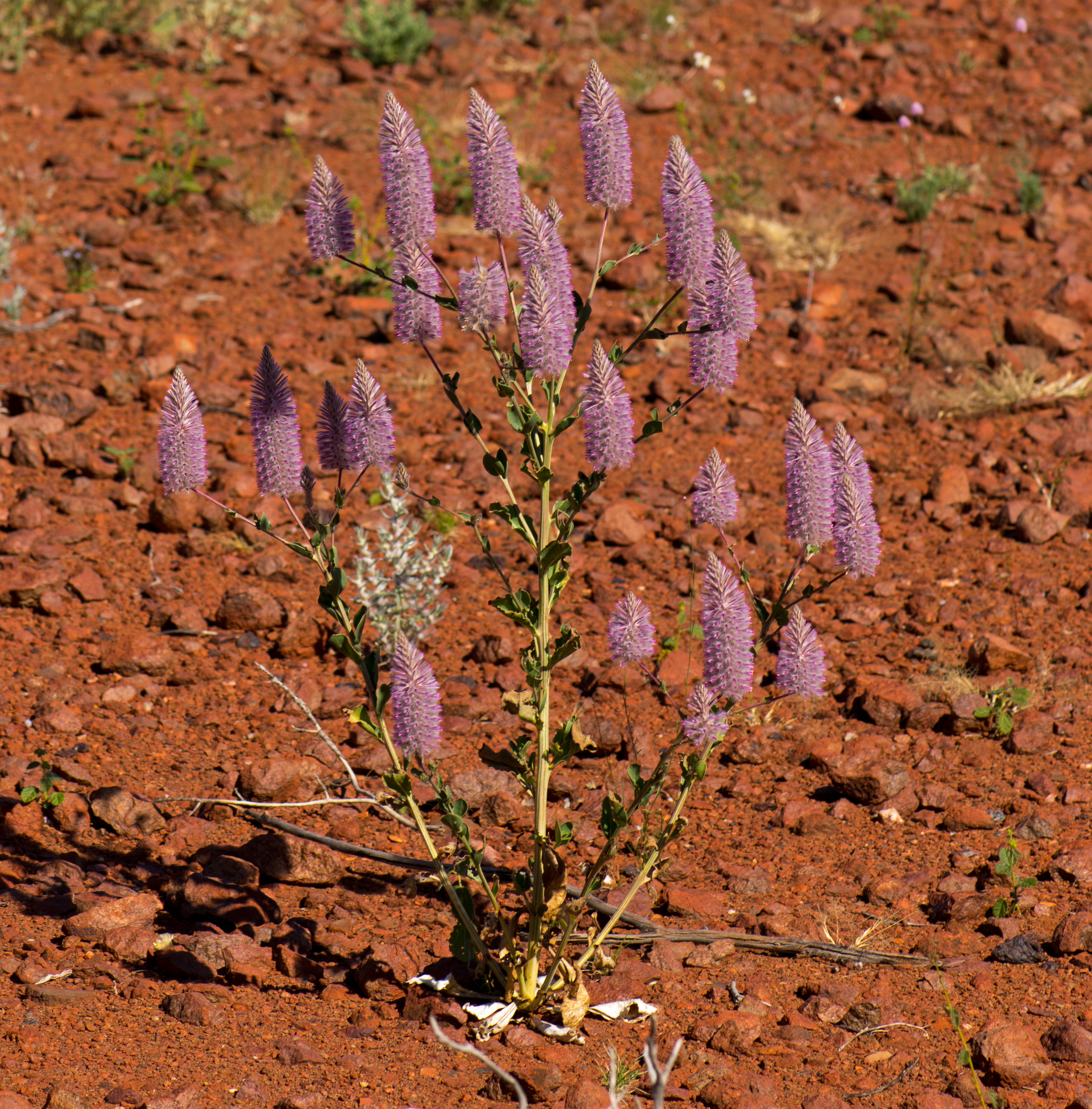
Ptilotus exaltatus

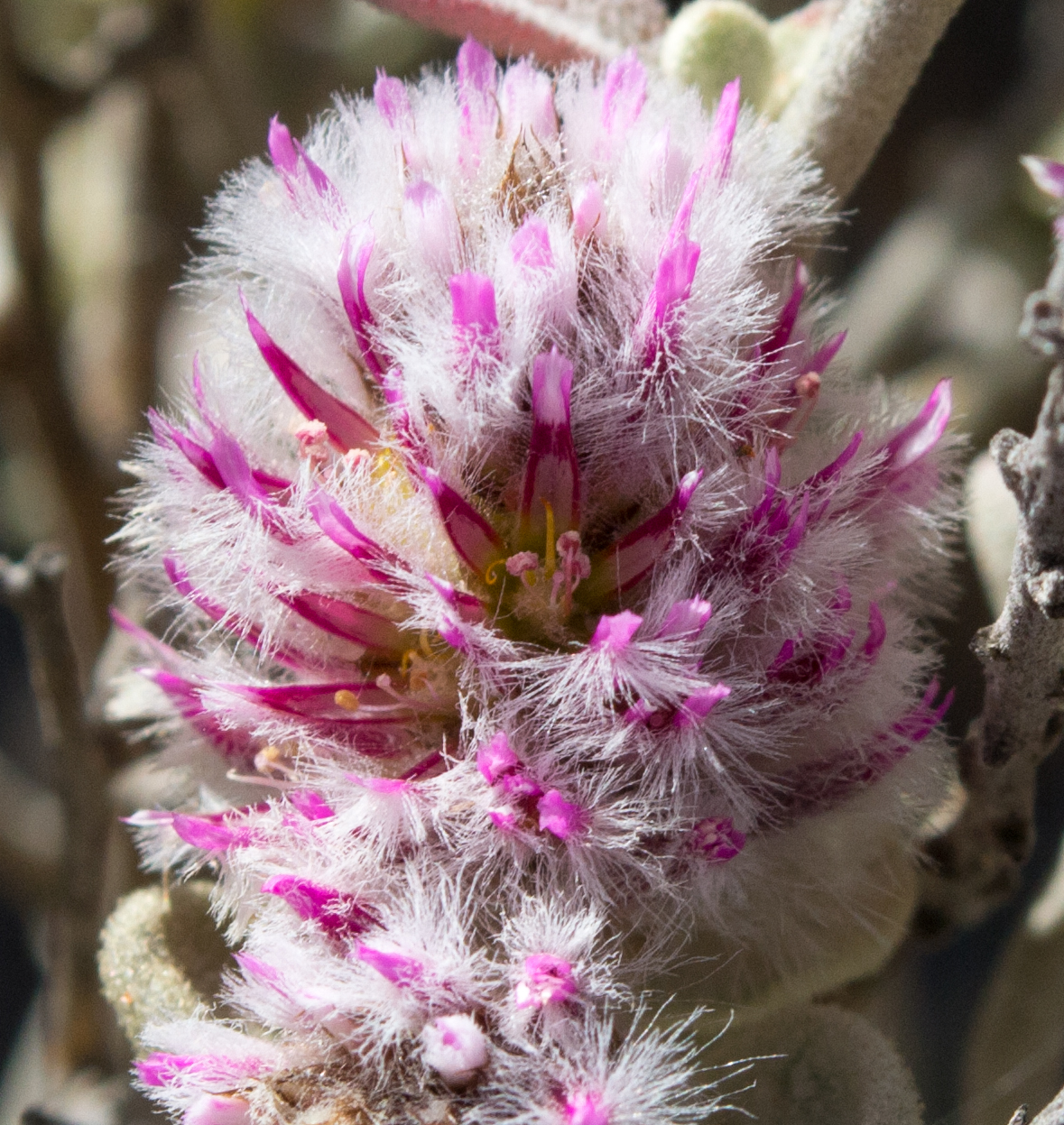
Ptilotus obovatus

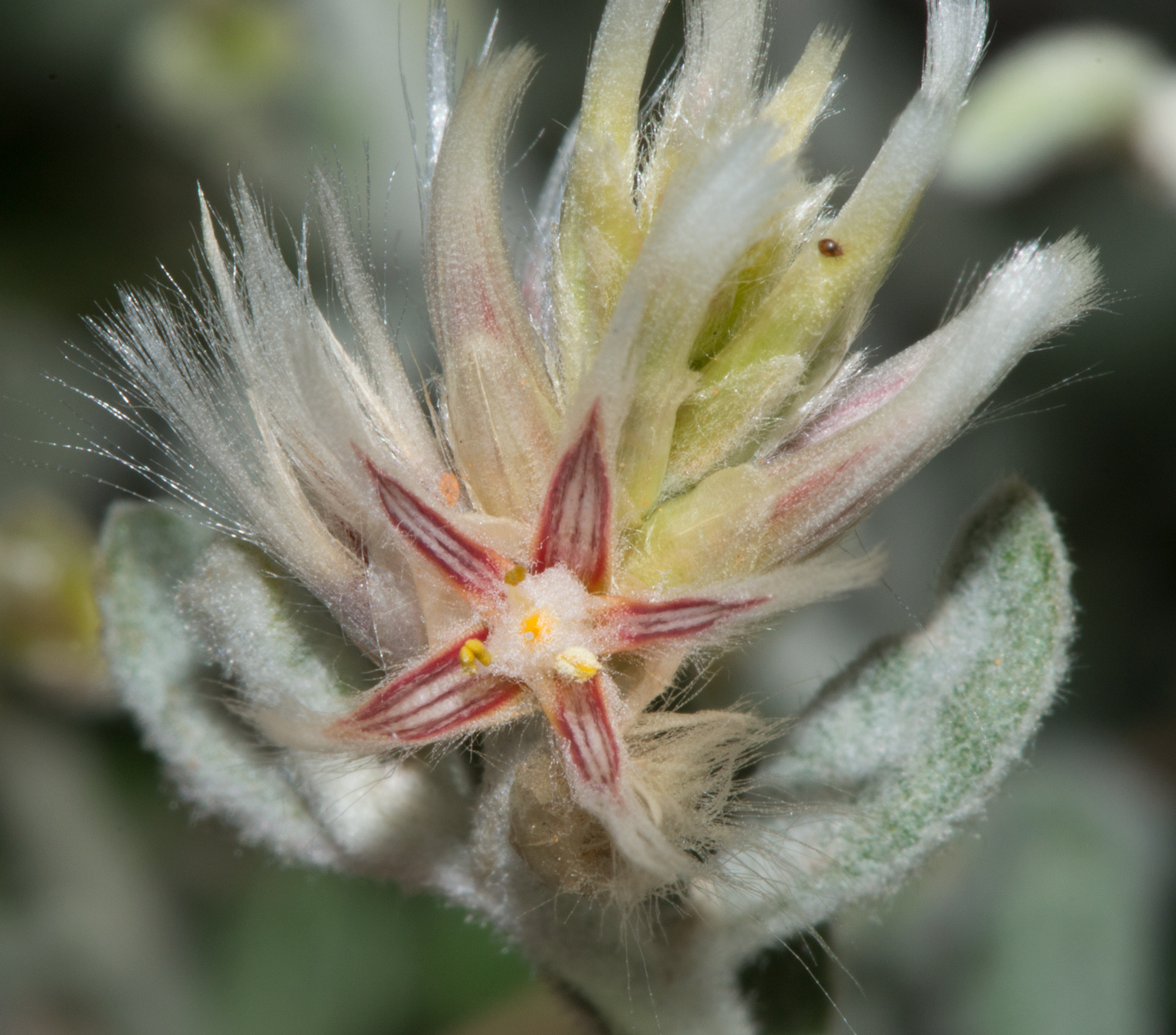
Ptilotus eriotrichus

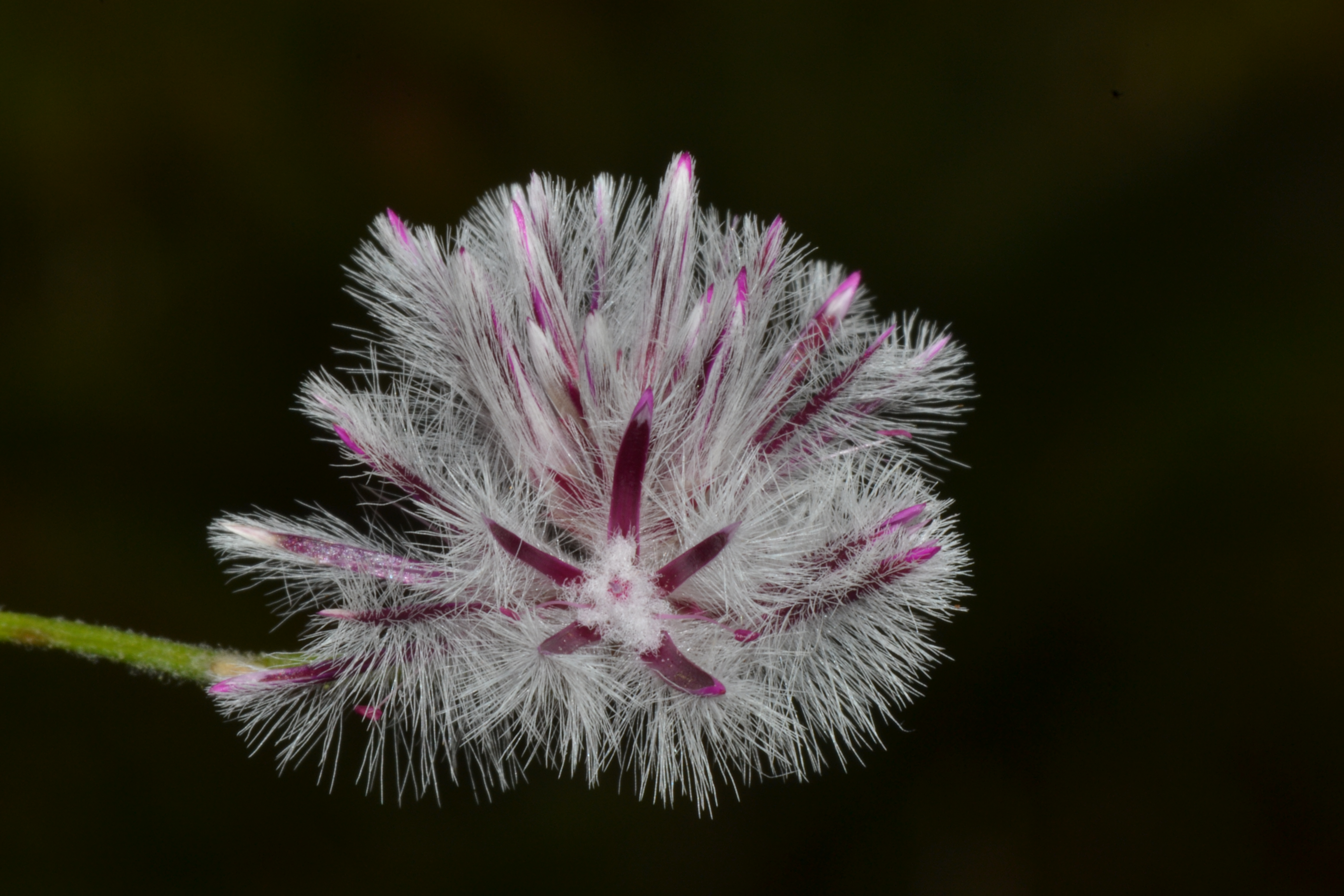
Ptilotus stirlingii subsp. stirlingii

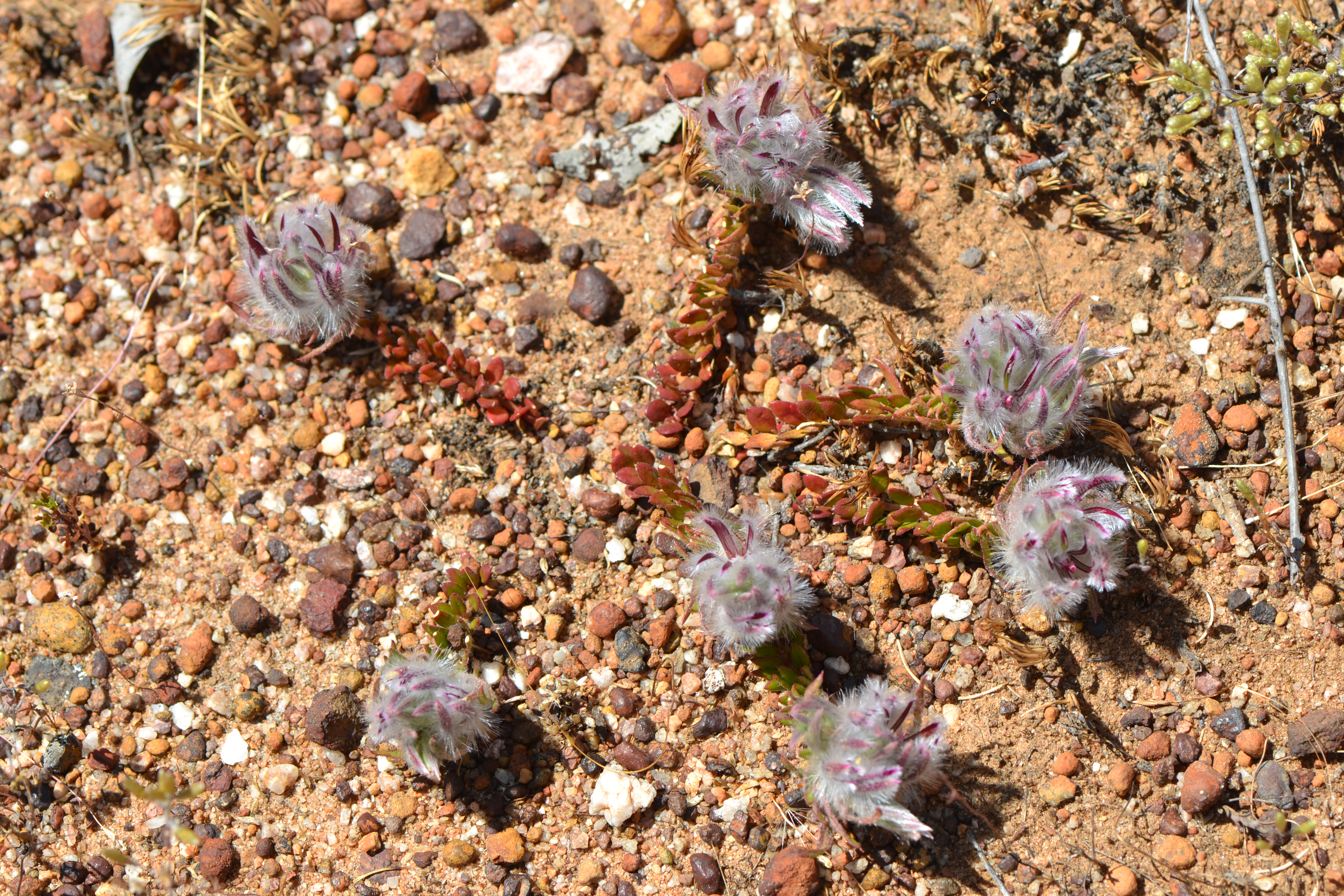
Ptilotus declinatus

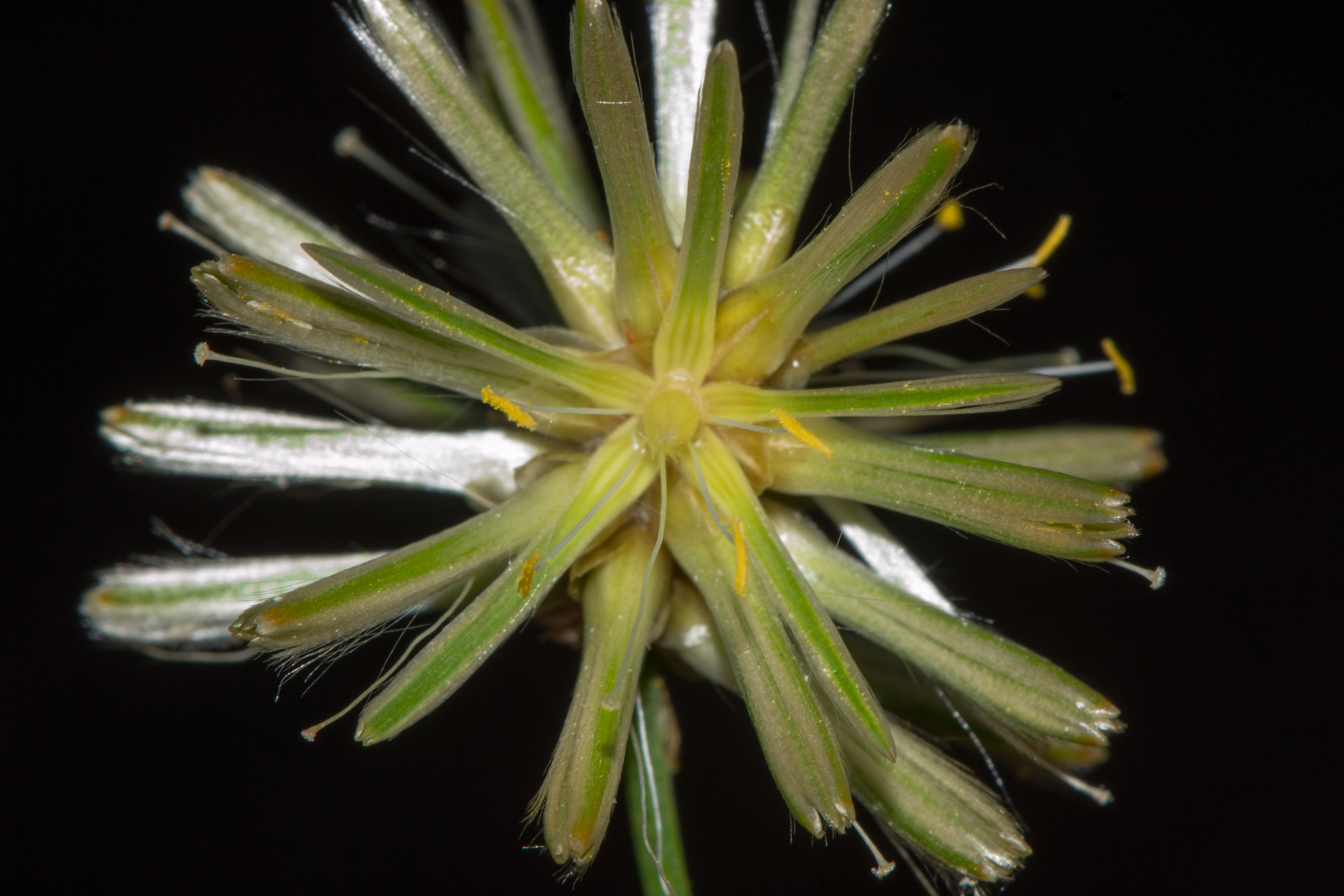
Ptilotus fusiformis

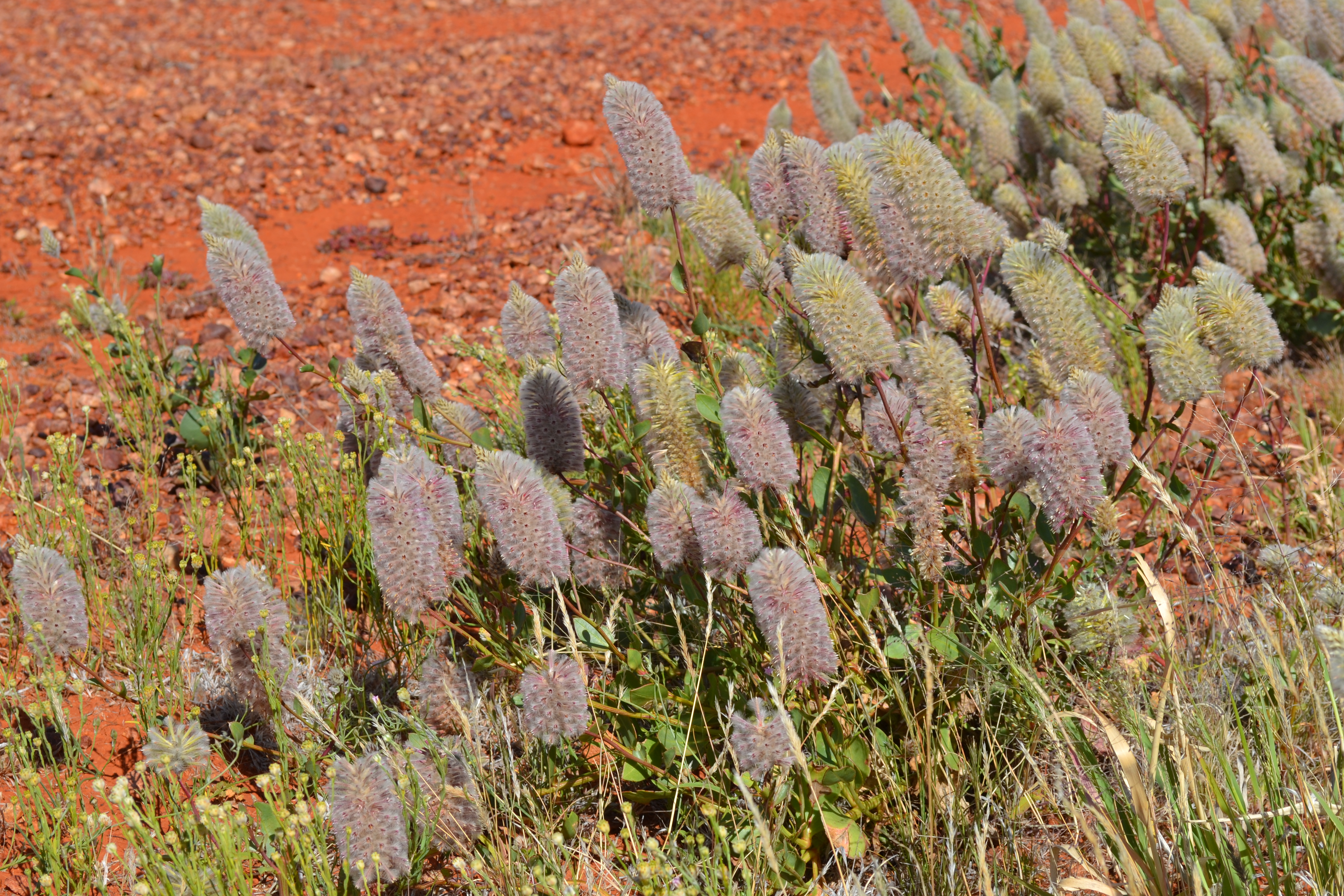
Ptilotus nobilis

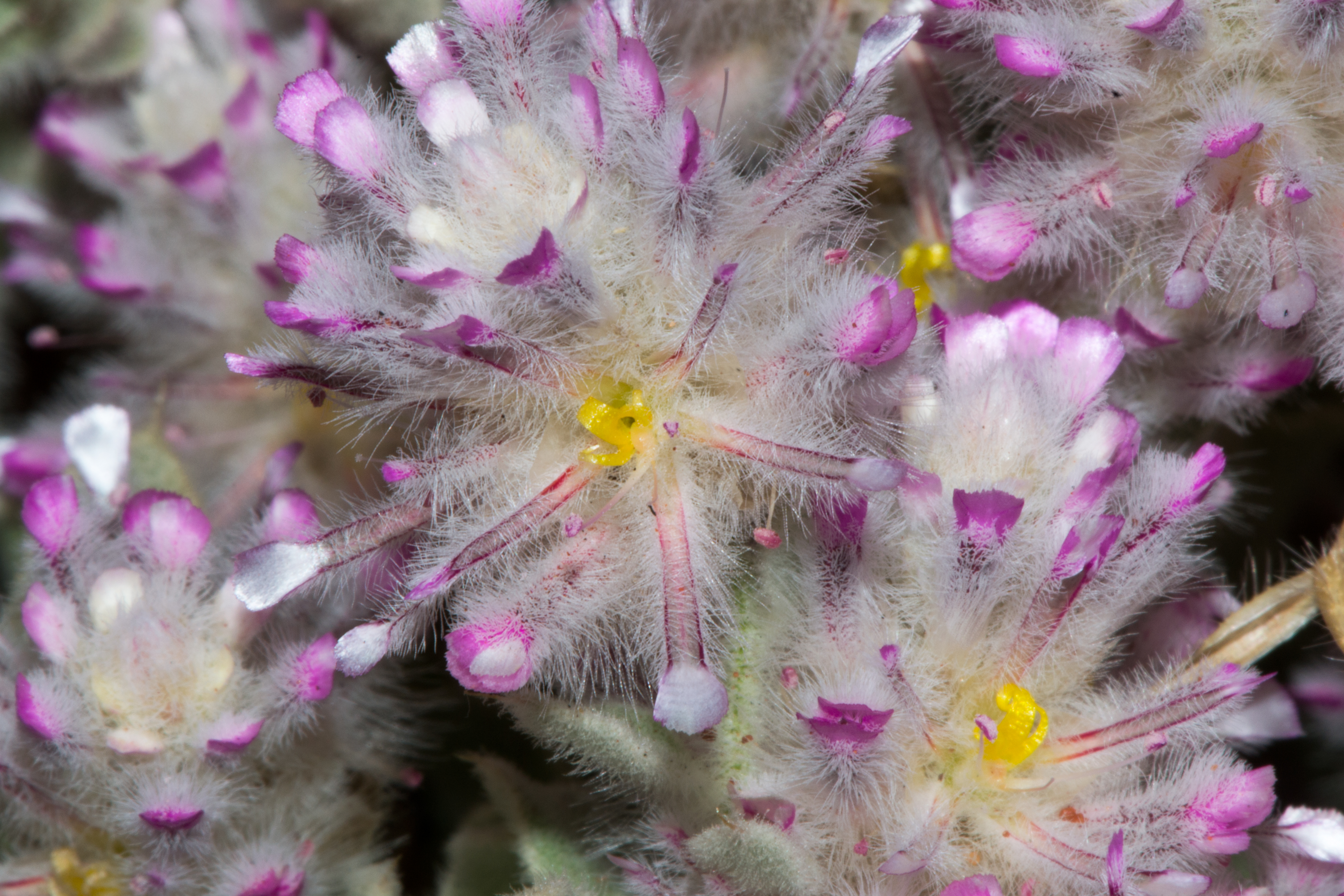
Ptilotus appendiculatus

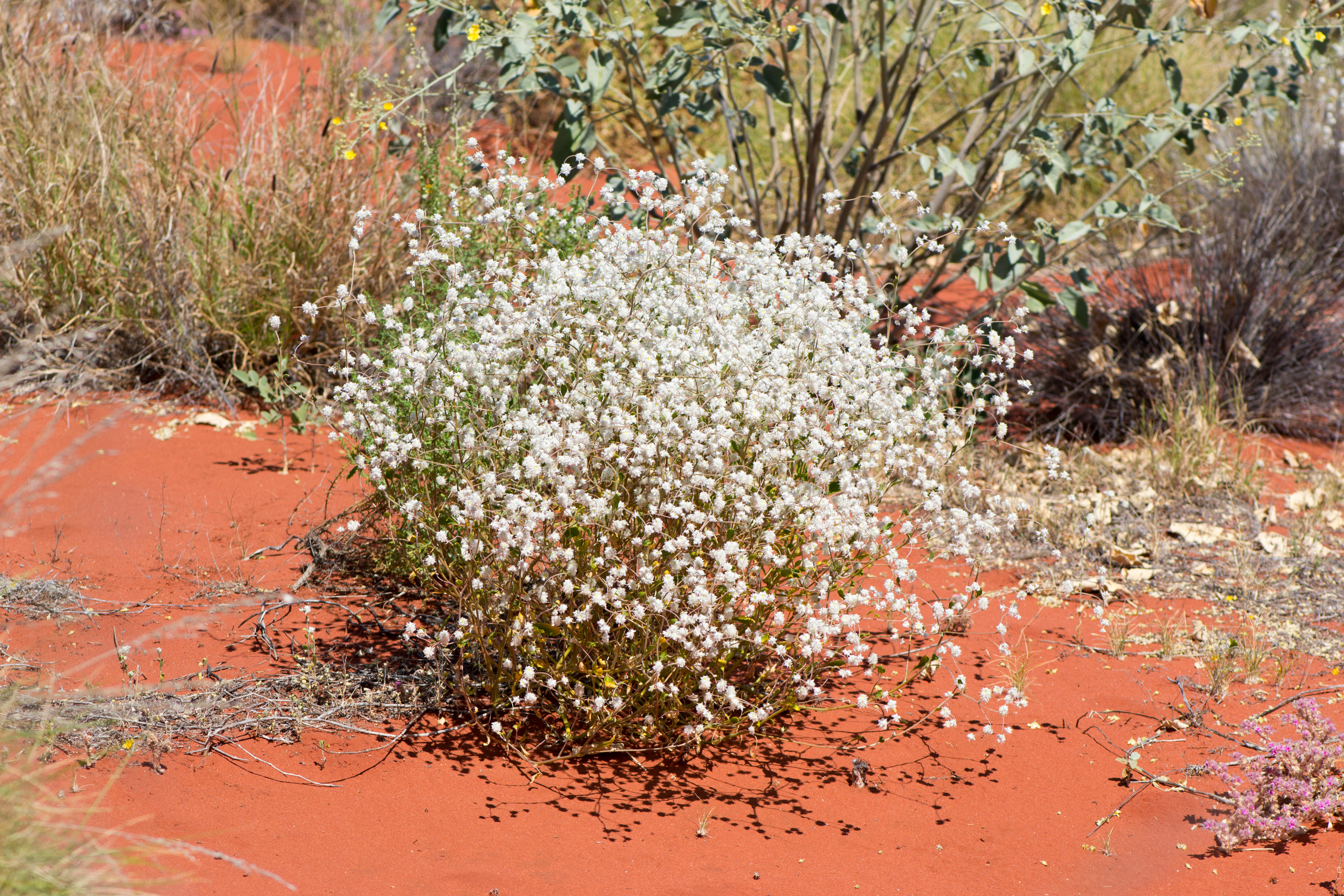
Ptilotus latifolius

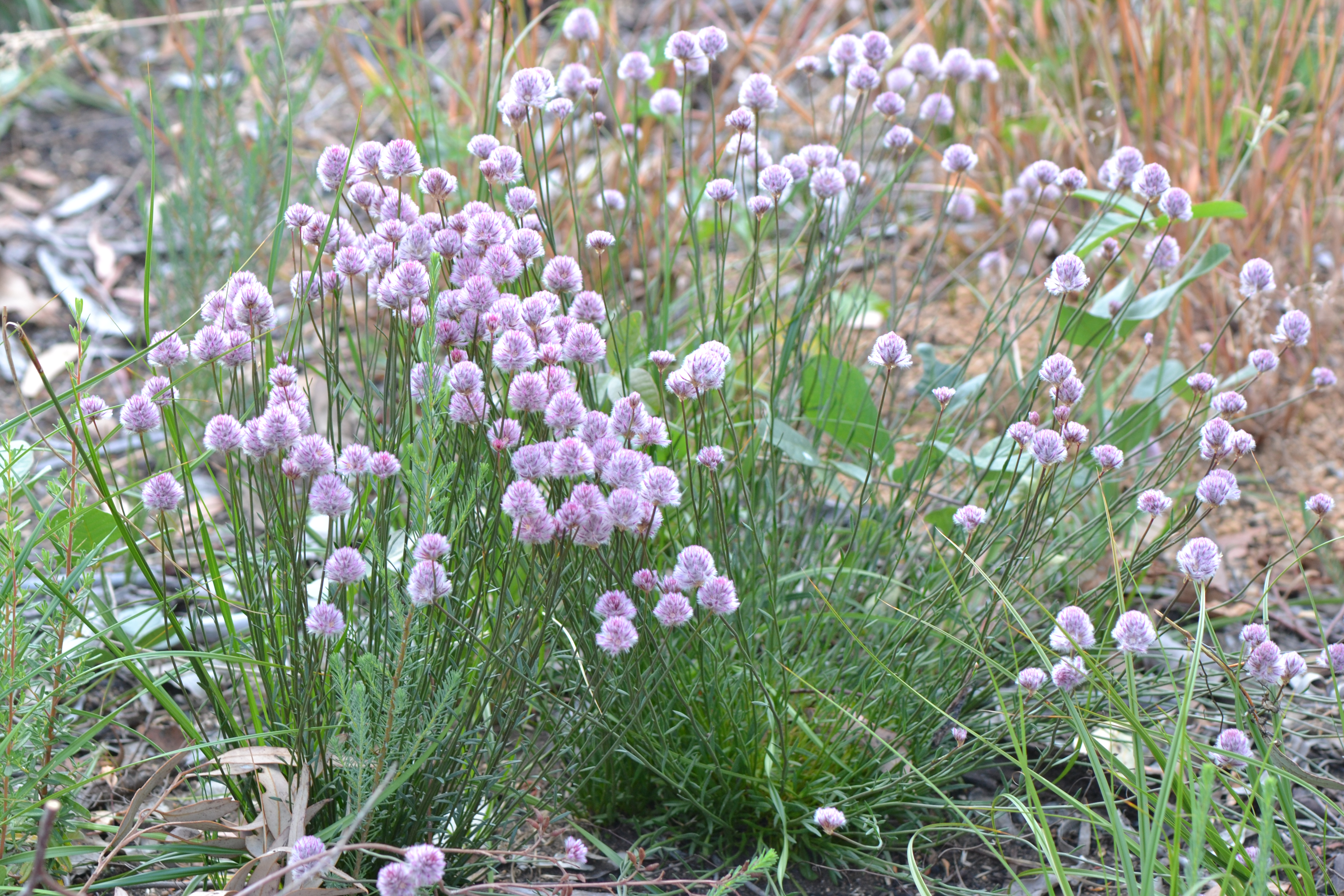
Ptilotus drummondii

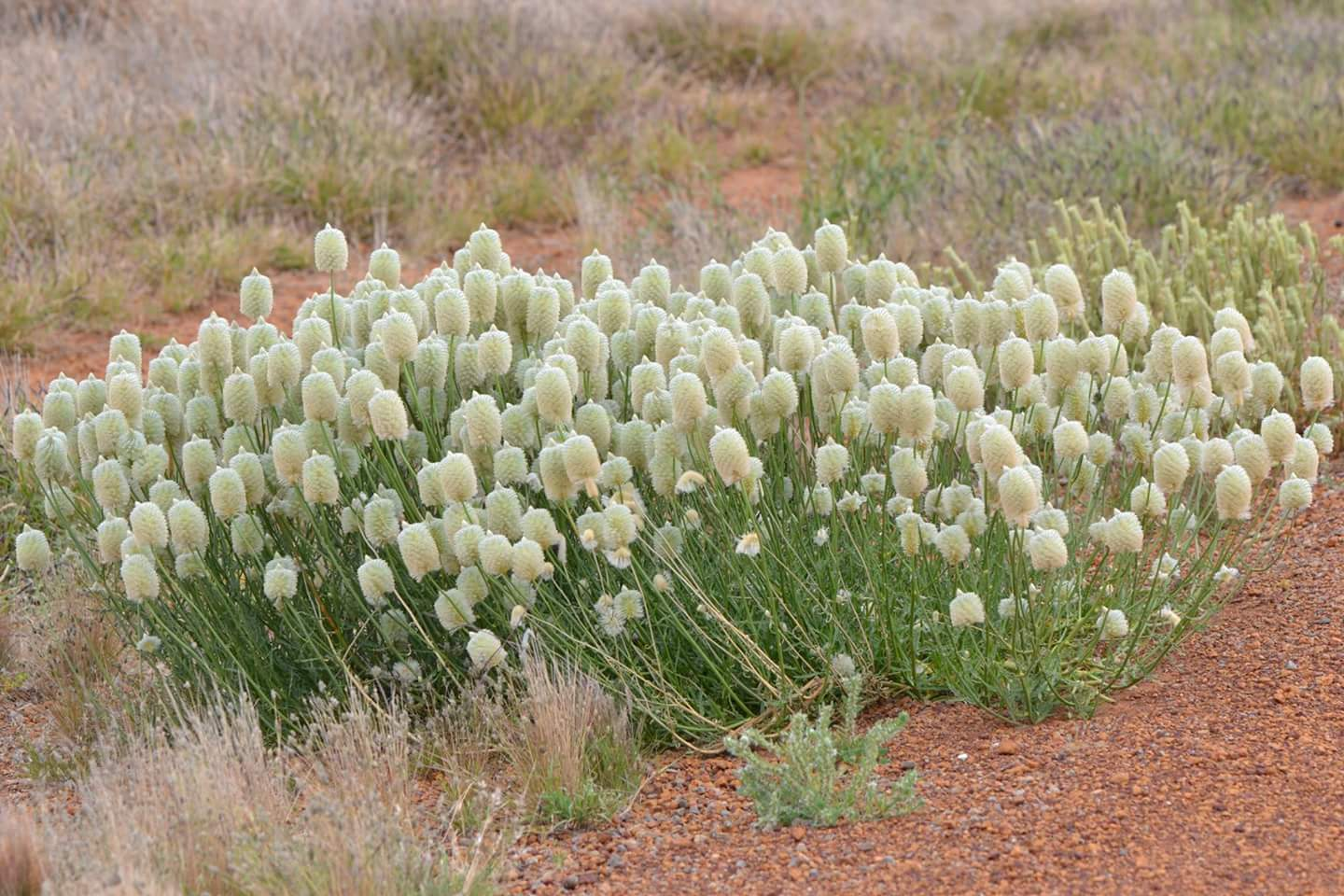
Ptilotus xerophilus

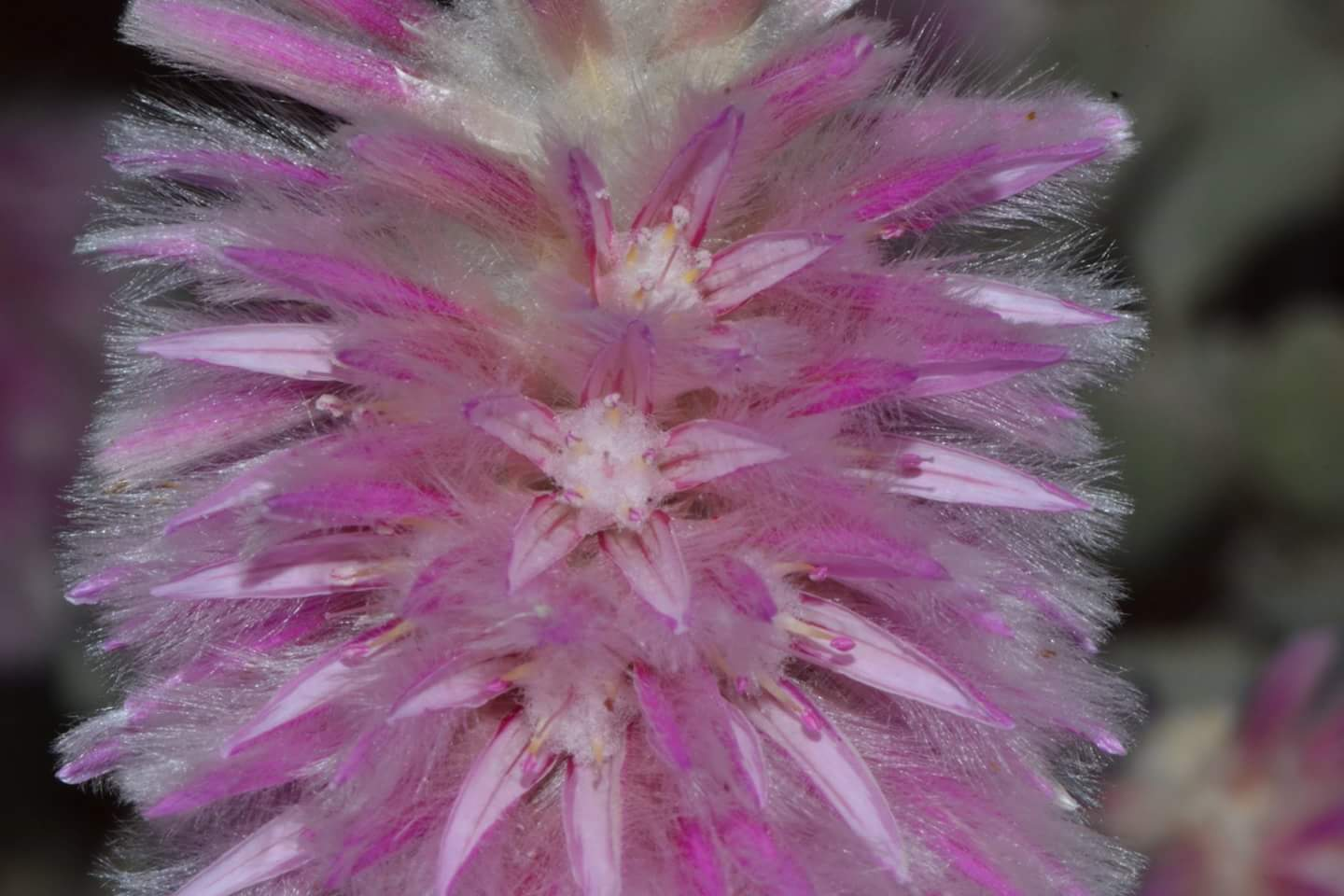
Ptilotus rotundifolius
