= Hansjörg Eichler =

- Born: 1 April 1916; Ravensburg, Baden-Württemberg
- Died: 22 June 1992 (aged 76); Berlin
- Citizenship: German, Australian
- Education: Berlin-Dahlem Botanical Museum University of Halle-Wittenberg
- Scientific career
- Fields: Botany
- Workplaces: Nationaal Natuurhistorisch Museum Naturalis in Leiden, State Herbarium of South Australia, Australian National Herbarium, University of Adelaide
- Author abbrev. (botany): H.Eichler

Hansjörg Eichler (1 April 1916 – 22 June 1992) was a German-born botanist, educated in Europe, who worked in Europe and Australia, and whose greatest contribution was to Australian botany.

The standard author abbreviation H.Eichler is used to indicate this person as the author when citing a botanical name.

== Life ==
Hansjörg Eichler, the son of architect, Gustav Eichler, and painter, Anna Eichler (née Sellin), was born in Ravensburg in 1916. At the Ravensburg school, one of his teachers was Karl Bertsch, a leading Württemberg botanist, who stimulated his interest in botany and took him on private botanical excursions. In 1936, the family moved to Berlin, and Eichler started working at the Botanisches Museum Berlin-Dahlem (as a volunteer) under the tutelage of Friedrich Ludwig E Diels, at the same time having enrolled at the University of Berlin, to study botany and chemistry. The work at the Botanisches Museum ceased in 1943 when a bombing raid wrecked the museum. In 1944, he was exempted from war service to allow him to both study and work at the Kaiser-Wilhelm-Institut für Kulturpflanzenforschung (now the Leibniz-Institut für Pflanzengenetik und Kulturpflanzenforschung) in Vienna.

After the war (1946–1949), he was able to continue his studies at the University of Halle-Wittenberg, and, in 1950, received his Doctorate in Natural Sciences for a thesis on floristic and phyto-oenological investigations into the Hakel. He married Marie-Louise Möhring in 1953, and went to Parma, and from there to the Nationaal Natuurhistorisch Museum Naturalis in Leiden, to work on Ranunculaceae.

In 1955, he was appointed the first Keeper of the State Herbarium of South Australia (1955–1972), and then curator of the Herbarium Australiense (which later became the Australian National Herbarium), within the CSIRO division of Plant Industry, a position held from 1973 until his retirement in 1981. In Canberra, he founded the journal, Brunonia.

In 1993 the Australian Systematic Botany Society established the Hansjörg Eichler Research Fund in his honour, and makes awards for projects contributing to Australian systematic botany. His personal herbarium of over 24,000 specimens was divided between the State Herbarium of South Australia and the Australian National Herbarium.

== Work ==
In addition to his contributions to botany in his roles at the State Herbarium of South Australia and later at the Australian National Herbarium, he contributed both nationally and internationally via service on many committees:

- Committee for Spermatophyta, International Association for Plant Taxonomy (1968–1992)
- Committee for Nomina Conservanda, International Association for Plant Taxonomy (1975–1981)
- Special committee for Orthography, International Association for Plant Taxonomy (1982–1987)
- Editorial committee World Pollen and Spore Flora (1972–1975)
- Advisory committee, Australian Journal of Botany (1972–1977)
- Editorial committee, Index Holmensis (1974–1992)
- Chair, editorial board, Brunonia (1977–1982)
- Editorial committee, Flora of Australia (1980–1985)

=== Selected publications ===
- (1958) Revision der Ranunculaceen Malesiens. Stuttgart. (Trove listing – book)
- – & Black, J.M. (1965) Supplement to J.M. Black's Flora of South Australia. (2nd Edition, 1943–1957). W.L. Hawes.
- (1963) Some New Names and New Combinations Relevant to the Australian Flora. Taxon 12: 295–297. doi:10.2307/1216578
- Benl, G, & – (1982) Ptilotus pedleyanus, a new species of Amaranthaceae from Queensland. Brunonia 4(2): 199–207. doi:10.1071/BRU9810199

=== Published names ===
APNI gives some 91 published names. IPNI (with duplication) lists 152.

Published names given by APNI (Australian Plant Name Index)

1. Actinobole uliginosum (A.Gray) H.Eichler
2. Agrostis spicatus H.Eichler, orth. var.
3. Amyema miraculosa var. boormanii (Blakely) H.Eichler
4. Amyema miraculosa (Miq.) Tiegh. var. miraculosa
5. Aristida contorta var. hirsuta (Henrard) H.Eichler
6. Asparagus medeloides H.Eichler, orth. var.
7. Atriplex acutibracta H.Eichler, orth. var.
8. Atriplex acutibracta subsp. acutibracta H.Eichler, orth. var.
9. Atriplex acutibracta subsp. karonensis H.Eichler, orth. var.
10. Atriplex cinerea var. adscendens (Nees) H.Eichler
11. Atriplex leptocarpa f. inermis H.Eichler, nom. inval., nom. nud.
12. Atriplex macropterocarpa (Aellen) H.Eichler
13. Bulbinopsis semibarbata var. depilata (J.M.Black) H.Eichler
14. Calandrinia neesiana H.Eichler
15. Callistemon macropunctatus var. laevifolius (F.Muell. ex Miq.) H.Eichler
16. Centaurium littoralis H.Eichler, orth. var.
17. Clematis leptophylla (F.Muell. ex Benth.) H.Eichler
18. Datura meteleoides H.Eichler, orth. var.
19. Diplotaxis muralis var. caulescens H.Eichler, orth. var.
20. Eucalyptus brachycalyx var. protrusa (J.M.Black) H.Eichler
21. Eucalyptus clelandii H.Eichler, orth. var.
22. Evax pygmea H.Eichler, orth. var.
23. Exocarpos strictus var. syrticolus H.Eichler, orth. var.
24. Filago pygmea H.Eichler, orth. var.
25. Gasoul aitonis (Jacq.) H.Eichler
26. Glochidion hirtellus (F.Muell.) H.Eichler
27. Glochidion rhytidospermum (Müll.Arg.) H.Eichler
28. Glochidion rigens (F.Muell.) H.Eichler
29. Glochidion thesioides H.Eichler
30. Glochidion trachyspermum (F.Muell.) H.Eichler
31. Gnephosis foliata (Sond.) H.Eichler
32. Hannafordia bissellii H.Eichler, orth. var.
33. Helichrysum lindleyi H.Eichler
34. Helichrysum monochaetum (F.Muell.) H.Eichler
35. Helixia H.Eichler orth. var.
36. Helixia setifolia H.Eichler, orth. var.
37. Homalosciadium homalocarpum (F.Muell.) H.Eichler
38. Hydrocotyle coorowensis H.Eichler MS
39. Hydrocotyle coraginaensis H.Eichler MS
40. Hydrocotyle crassipes H.Eichler MS
41. Hydrocotyle decipiens H.Eichler MS
42. Hydrocotyle foveolata H.Eichler
43. Hydrocotyle hamelinensis H.Eichler MS
44. Hydrocotyle sp. Harts Range (A.C.Beauglehole 44720) H.Eichler
45. Hydrocotyle hexaptera H.Eichler MS
46. Hydrocotyle puberula H.Eichler MS
47. Hydrocotyle vigintimilia H.Eichler MS
48. Hydrocotyle sp. Watarrka (A.C.Beauglehole 20471) H.Eichler
49. Indigofera dominii H.Eichler, nom. illeg., nom. superfl.
50. Lilaeopsis polyantha (Gand.) H.Eichler
51. Luzula rhadiana H.Eichler, orth. var.
52. Lysiana exocarpi (Behr) Tiegh. f. exocarpi
53. Lysiana exocarpi f. flavescens (F.Muell. ex Miq.) H.Eichler
54. Machaerina rubiginosa (Spreng.) H.Eichler, isonym
55. Machaerina tetragona H.Eichler, nom. inval.
56. Nymphoides crenatum H.Eichler, orth. var.
57. Nymphoides exiliflorum H.Eichler, orth. var.
58. Nymphoides geminatum H.Eichler, orth. var.
59. Nymphoides stygia (J.M.Black) H.Eichler
60. Nymphoides stygium H.Eichler, orth. var.
61. Pectinellia H.Eichler, orth. var.
62. Pectinellia griffithii H.Eichler, orth. var.
63. Phyllanthus hirtellus var. parviflorus (J.M.Black) H.Eichler
64. Platysace heterophylla var. tepperi (J.M.Black) H.Eichler
65. Platysace rupestris H.Eichler MS
66. Psychrophila phylloptera (A.W.Hill) H.Eichler
67. Ptilotus helipteroides var. minor (J.M.Black) H.Eichler
68. Ranunculus hamatosetosus H.Eichler
69. Ranunculus lourteigiae H.Eichler
70. Ranunculus pentandrus var. platycarpus (F.Muell.) H.Eichler
71. Salicornia australasica (Moq.) H.Eichler
72. Sarojusticia kempeana (F.Muell.) Bremek. ex H.Eichler
73. Sarojusticia kempeana (F.Muell.) Bremek. ex H.Eichler subsp. kempeana
74. Solanum symonii H.Eichler
75. Swainsona sericea (A.T.Lee) J.M.Black ex H.Eichler
76. Tetragonia amplexicoma H.Eichler, orth. var.
77. Trachymene ornata var. semilanata (J.M.Black) H.Eichler
78. Trianthema chrystallina H.Eichler, orth. var.
79. Trianthema triquetra var. clavata H.Eichler, orth. var.
80. Trianthema triquetrum var. clavatum (J.M.Black) H.Eichler
81. Tribulopis affinis (W.Fitzg.) H.Eichler
82. Tribulopis sessilis (Domin) H.Eichler
83. Wahlenbergia fluminale E.Wimm. ex H.Eichler, orth. var.
84. Wahlenbergia fluminalis (J.M.Black) E.Wimm. ex H.Eichler
85. Zaleya galericulata (Melville) H.Eichler
86. Zygophyllum angustifolium H.Eichler
87. Zygophyllum aurantiacum var. eremaeum (Diels) H.Eichler
88. Zygophyllum confluens H.Eichler
89. Zygophyllum emarginatum H.Eichler
90. Zygophyllum simile H.Eichler
91. Zygophyllum sonderi H.Eichler

== Honours ==
- In 1979, he was awarded the Willdenow Medal (awarded by the Berlin-Dahlem Herbarium) for his work towards the restoration of Berlin-Dahlem Herbarium.

=== Some plants named for him ===
- Chionogentias eichleri L.G.Adams (Gentianaceae) Austral. Syst. Bot. 8(5): 973 (1995)
- Picris eichleri Lack & S.Holzapfel (Asteraceae) Willdenowia 23(1–2): 188. (1993)
- Ptilotus eichlerianus Benl (Amaranthaceae) Mitteilungen der Botanischen Staatssammlung München 7: 310. (1970)
- Ranunculus eichlerianus B.G.Briggs (Ranunculaceae) Proceedings of the Linnean Society of New South Wales 84: 313 (1959)

== See also ==
- Taxa named by Hansjörg Eichler
- Conn, B.J. (1981) 'Dr Hans-Jörg Eichler, on the occasion of his retirement', Australian Systematic Botany Society Newsletter, vol. 26, pp. 18–43.
- Orchard, A. E. (1995) 'Hansjörg Eichler (1916–1992)', Taxon, vol. 44, pp. 271–8.
- Orchard, Tony (2015) 'Memories of Hansjörg Eichler', Australasian Systematic Botany Society Newsletter, vol. 165, pp. 49–53.
- Robertson, Enid L. (1993) 'Hansjörg Eichler 1 April 1916 – 22 June 1992', Journal of the Adelaide Botanic Gardens, vol. 15, no. 81–5.
