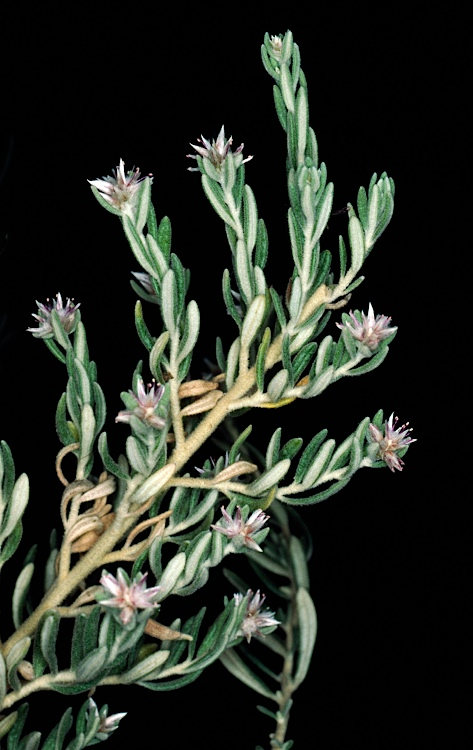
- In the Australian National Botanic Gardens

Scientific classification
- Kingdom: Plantae
- Clade: Tracheophytes
- Clade: Angiosperms
- Clade: Eudicots
- Order: Caryophyllales
- Family: Amaranthaceae
- Genus: Ptilotus
- Species: P. pedleyanus

Binomial name
- Ptilotus pedleyanus Benl & H.Eichler

Synonyms
- Ptilotus pedleyanus var. comosus Benl & H.Eichler; Ptilotus pedleyanus Benl & H.Eichler var. pedleyanus

= Ptilotus pedleyanus =

Species of plant

Ptilotus pedleyanus is a flowering of the family Amaranthaceae and is endemic to Queensland, Australia. It was first formally described in 1982 by Gerhard Benll and Hansjörg Eichler in the journal Brunonia from specimens collected on the edge of a scarp north-east of Barcaldine in 1975. The specific epithet (pedleyanus) honours Leslie Pedley, "Assistant Director of the Queensland Herbarium"', who supplied the authors with Ptilotus material.

Ptilotus pedleyanus grows on breakaways, and other stony hills between Winton, Aramac and Quilpie with Acacia catenulata and species of Eremophila.

Ptilotus pedleyanus is listed as of "least concern" under the Queensland Government Nature Conservation Act 1992.
