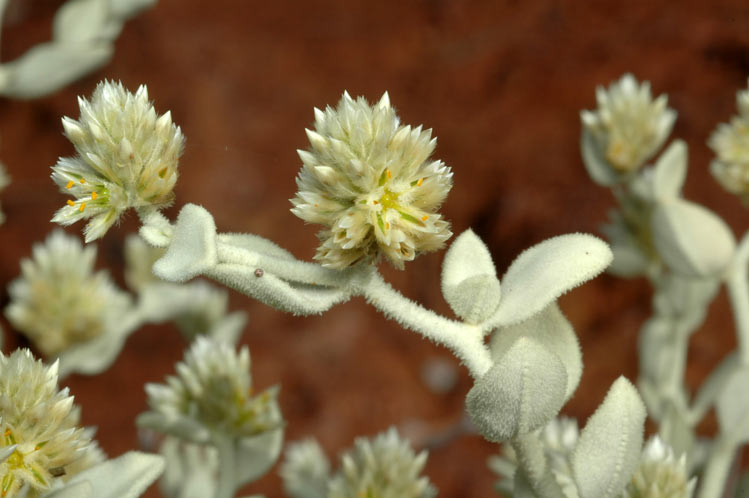

Scientific classification
- Kingdom: Plantae
- Clade: Tracheophytes
- Clade: Angiosperms
- Clade: Eudicots
- Order: Caryophyllales
- Family: Amaranthaceae
- Genus: Ptilotus
- Species: P. luteolus

Binomial name
- Ptilotus luteolus (Benl & H.Eichler) R.W.Davis

= Ptilotus luteolus =

Species of grass-like plant

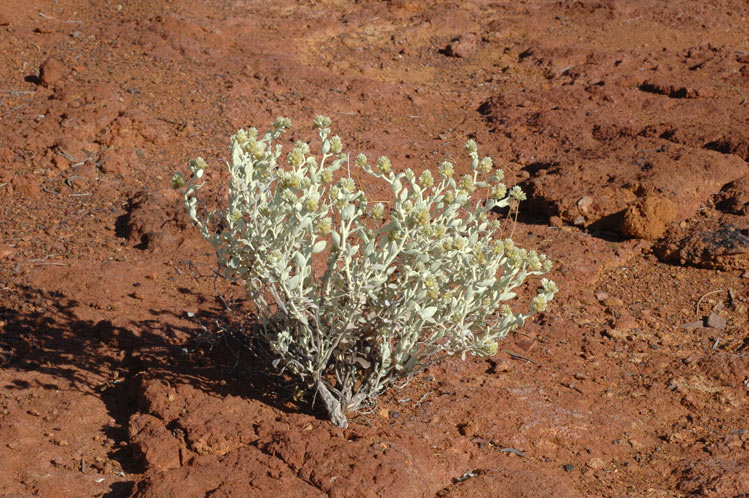
Habit near Mount Augustus

Ptilotus luteolus is a species of flowering plant in the family Amaranthaceae and is endemic to inland Western Australia. It is a shrub or perennial herb with a single hairy stem, and oval or cylindrical spikes of yellow flowers.

== Description ==
Ptilotus luteolus is a shrub or perennial herb, the stem leaves arranged alternately, mostly 8–30 mm (0.31–1.18 in) long and 5–15 mm (0.20–0.59 in) wide and persistently hairy. The flowers are yellow and densely arranged in oval or cylindrical spikes 14–18 mm (0.55–0.71 in) long. There are hairy, coloured bracts 3.0–3.2 mm (0.12–0.13 in) long with an obscure midrib, and colourless bracteoles 3.8–4.0 mm (0.15–0.16 in) long. The tepals are 6.2–7.0 mm (0.24–0.28 in) long and the style is straight, 2.9–3.0 mm (0.11–0.12 in) long and centrally fixed to the ovary.

== Taxonomy ==
This species was first formally described in 1983 by Gerhard Benl and Hansjörg Eichler who gave it the name Ptilotus astrolasius var. luteolus from specimens collected 13 km (8.1 mi) south of Meekatharra in 1957. In 2009, Robert Wayne Davis raised the variety to species status as P. luteolus in a later edition of Nuytsia. The specific epithet (luteolus) means 'pale yellow'.

== Distribution and habitat ==
This species of Ptilotus grows on rocky slopes, screes and ridges in the Gascoyne and Murchison bioregions of inland northern Western Australia.

== Conservation status ==
Ptilotus luteolus is listed as "Priority Three" by the Government of Western Australia Department of Biodiversity, Conservation and Attractions, meaning that it is poorly known and known from only a few locations but is not under imminent threat.

== See also ==
- List of Ptilotus species
