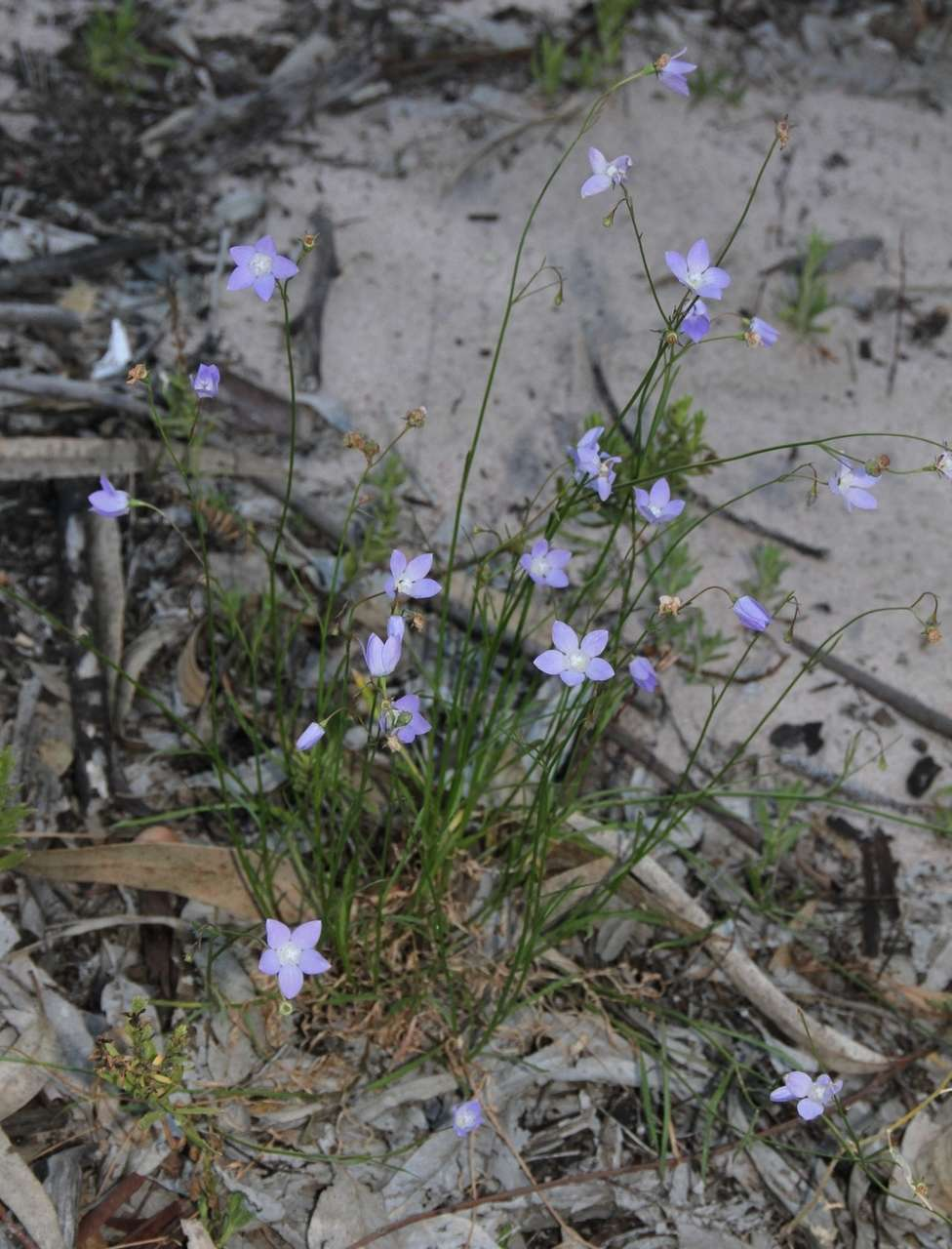

Scientific classification
- Kingdom: Plantae
- Clade: Tracheophytes
- Clade: Angiosperms
- Clade: Eudicots
- Clade: Asterids
- Order: Asterales
- Family: Campanulaceae
- Genus: Wahlenbergia
- Species: W. fluminalis

Binomial name
- Wahlenbergia fluminalis (J.M.Black) E.Wimm. ex H.Eichler

= Wahlenbergia fluminalis =

River bluebell

Species of plant

Wahlenbergia fluminalis, commonly known as the river bluebell, is a small herbaceous plant in the family Campanulaceae native to eastern Australia.

The tufted perennial herb typically grows to a height of 0.05 to 0.8 metres (0 to 3 ft). It blooms throughout the year producing blue flowers.

The species is found in New South Wales, Victoria, South Australia and Queensland.
