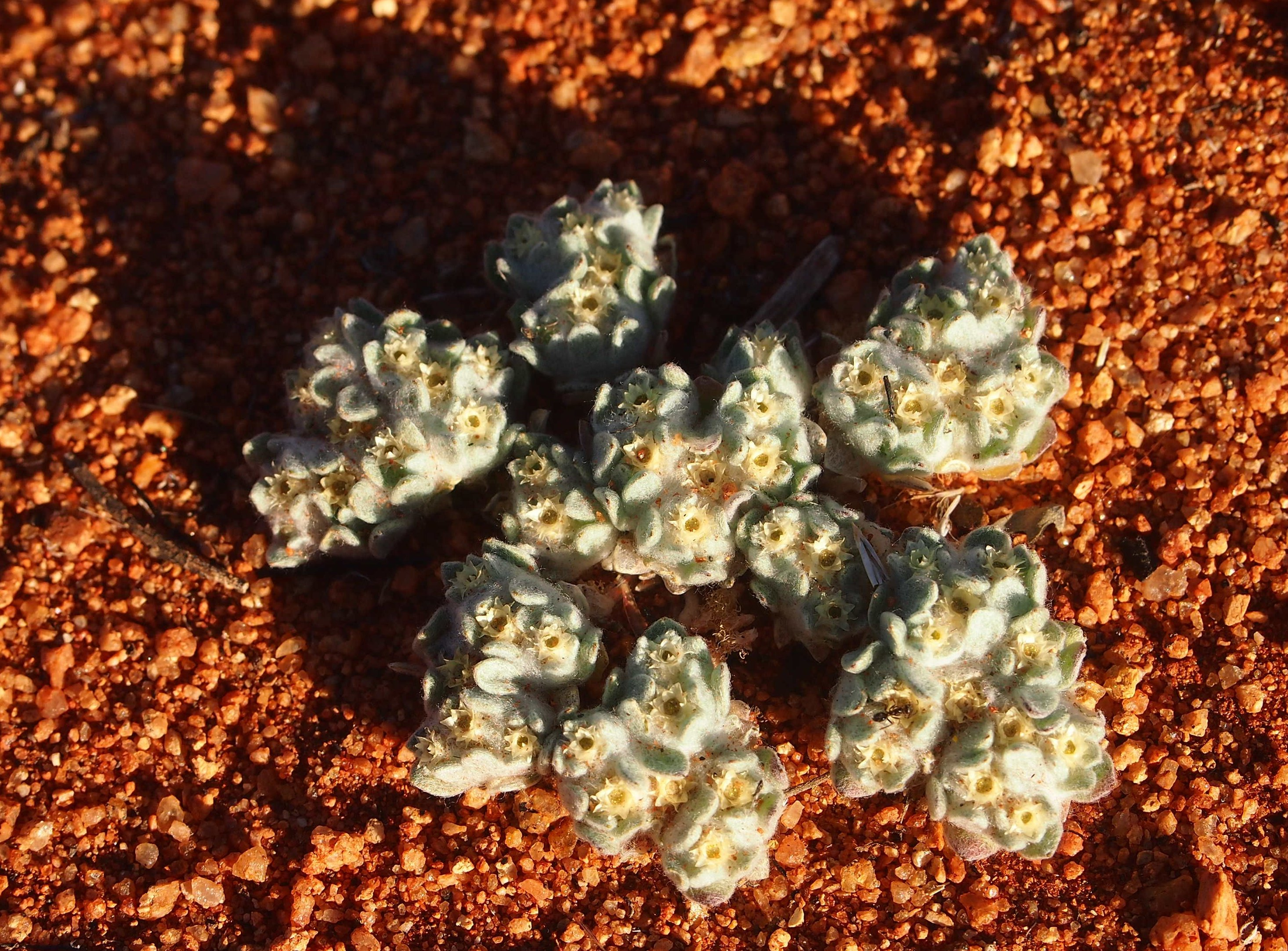
- Actinobole uliginosum

Scientific classification
- Kingdom: Plantae
- Clade: Tracheophytes
- Clade: Angiosperms
- Clade: Eudicots
- Clade: Asterids
- Order: Asterales
- Family: Asteraceae
- Subfamily: Asteroideae
- Tribe: Gnaphalieae
- Genus: Actinobole; Fenzl ex Endl.

= Actinobole =

Genus of flowering plants

Actinobole is a genus of dwarf annual herbs in the family Asteraceae described as a genus in 1843.

The entire genus is endemic to Australia, includes:

Species

- Actinobole condensatum (A.Gray) P.S.Short
- Actinobole drummondianum P.S.Short
- Actinobole oldfieldianum P.S.Short
- Actinobole uliginosum (A.Gray) H.Eichler - flannel cudweed
