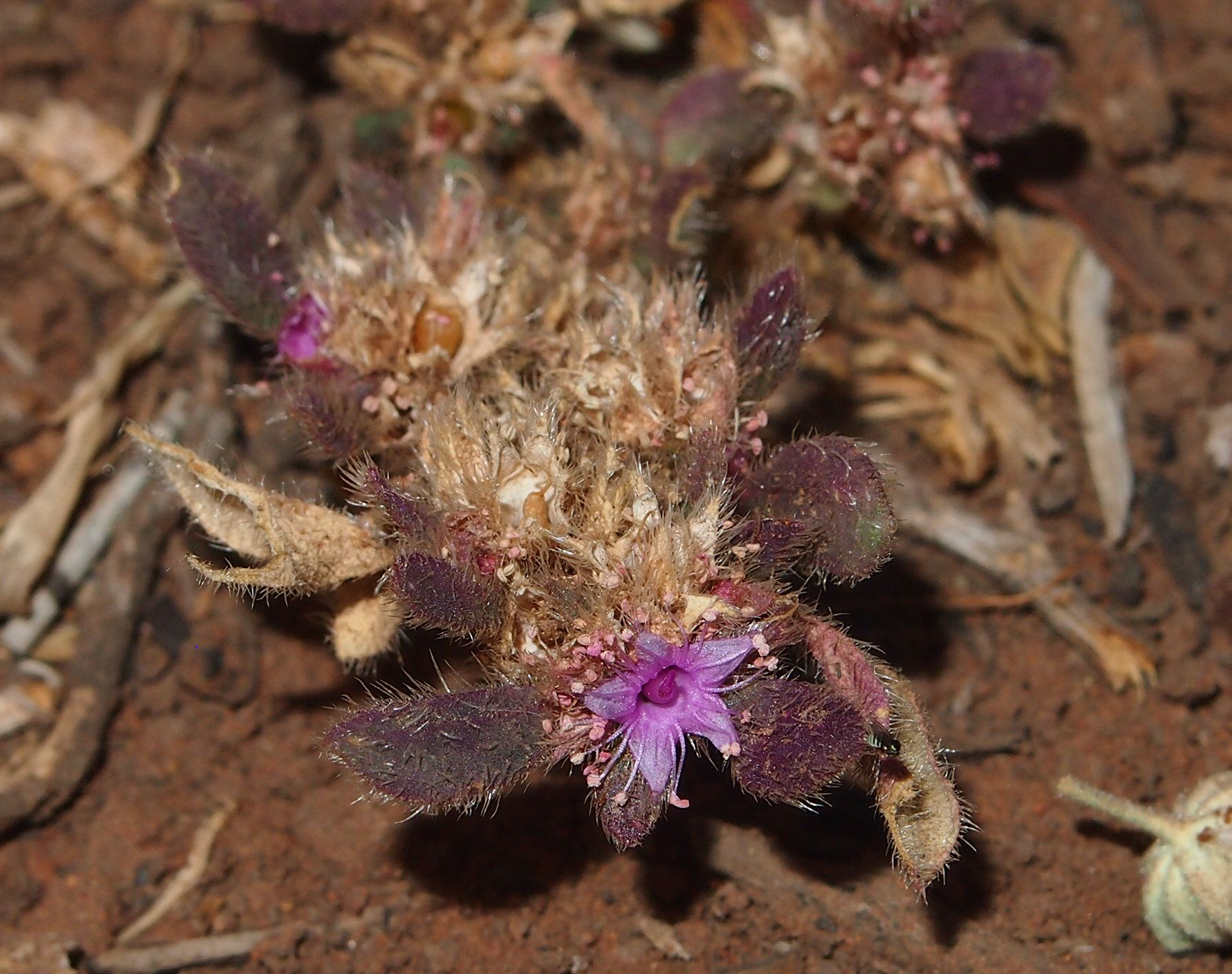
- Trianthema pilosum
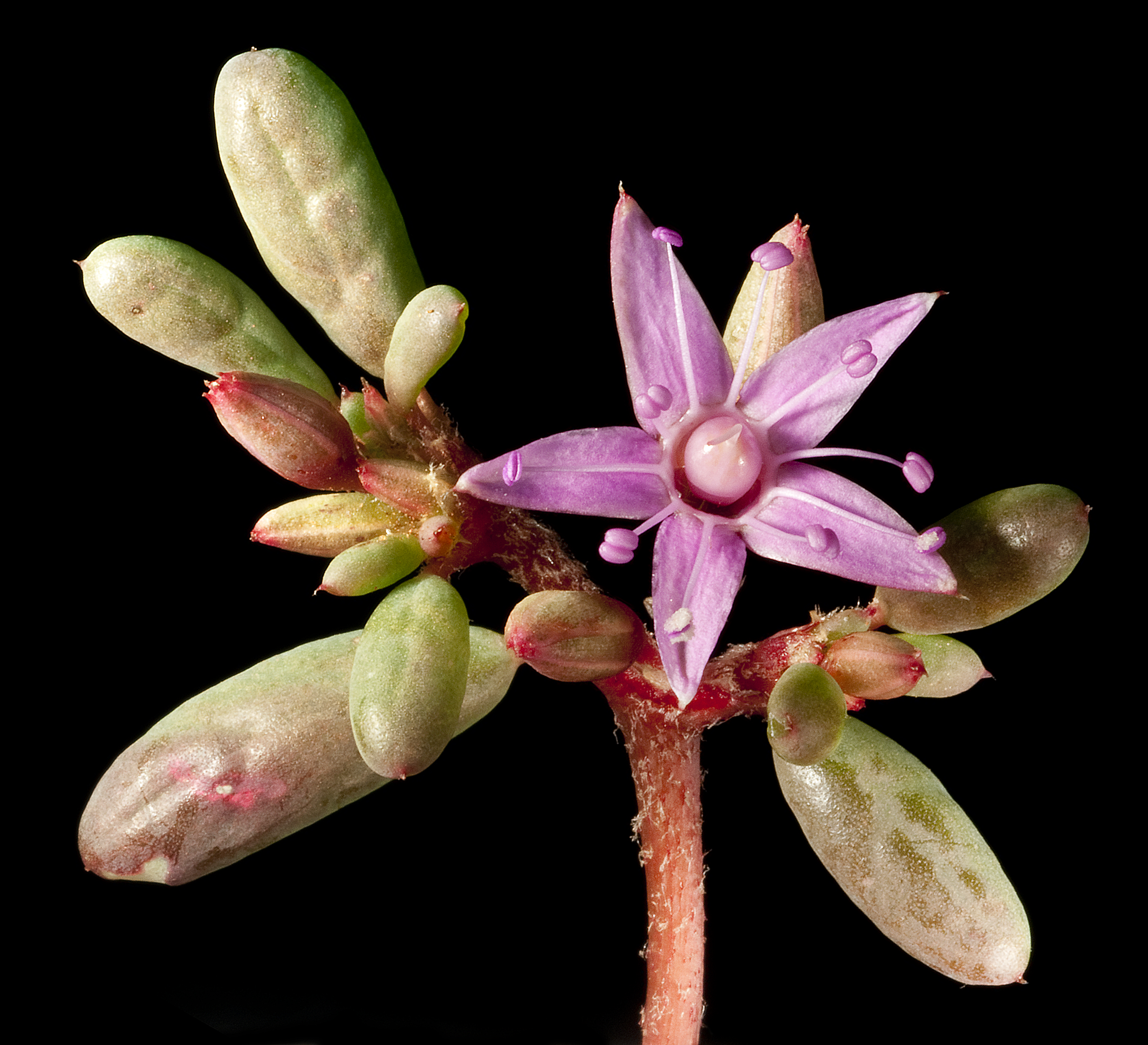
- Trianthema sp.

Scientific classification
- Kingdom: Plantae
- Clade: Tracheophytes
- Clade: Angiosperms
- Clade: Eudicots
- Order: Caryophyllales
- Family: Aizoaceae
- Subfamily: Sesuvioideae
- Genus: Trianthema; L.

Species
- About 30, see text.

Synonyms
- Ancistrostigma Fenzl; Diplochonium Fenzl; Papularia Forssk.; Portulacastrum Juss. ex Medik.; Racoma Willd. ex Steud.; Reme Adans.

= Trianthema =

Genus of succulents

Trianthema is a genus of flowering plants in the ice plant family, Aizoaceae. Members of the genus are annuals or perennials generally characterized by fleshy, opposite, unequal, smooth-margined leaves, a prostrate growth form, flowers with five perianth segments subtended by a pair of bracts, and a fruit with a winged lid. The genus contains about 30 described species growing in tropical and subtropical regions, especially Australia. One common species, Trianthema portulacastrum, desert horse purslane, is frequent as a weed in agricultural areas and is widely distributed.

== Taxonomy ==
The genus Trianthema was first formally described in 1753 by Carl Linnaeus in Species Plantarum.

=== Species list ===
The following is a list of species of Trianthema according to Plants of the World Online as at October 2020:

- Trianthema argentinum Hunz. & A.A.Cocucci (Argentina)
- Trianthema ceratosepalum Volkens & Irmsch. (Kenya, Somalia, Tanzania)
- Trianthema clavatum (J.M.Black) H.E.K.Hartmann & Liede (South Australia)
- Trianthema compactum C.T.White (Queensland, Northern Territory))
- Trianthema corallicola H.E.K.Hartmann & Liede (Kenya, Somalia)
- Trianthema corymbosum (E.Mey. ex Sond.) H.E.K.Hartmann & Liede (South Africa)
- Trianthema crystallinum (Forssk.) Vahl (Bangladesh, Myanmar, Africa, Yemen, South Africa)
- Trianthema cussackianum F.Muell. (Western Australia)
- Trianthema cypseleoides (Fenzl) Benth. (New South Wales)
- Trianthema glossostigma F.Muell. (Northern Territory, Western Australia)
- Trianthema hecatandrum Wingf. & M.F.Newman (Venezuela)
- Trianthema hereroense Schinz (Namibia)
- Trianthema kimberleyi Bittrich & K.M.Jenssen (Western Australia)
- Trianthema megaspermum A.M.Prescott (Northern Territory)
- Trianthema mozambiquense H.E.K.Hartmann & Liede (Mozambique)
- Trianthema oxycalyptrum F.Muell. (Northern Territory, Western Australia)
- Trianthema pakistanense H.E.K.Hartmann & Liede (India, Pakistan)
- Trianthema parvifolium E.Mey. ex Sond. (Angola, Botswana, Cape Provinces, Free State, Namibia, Northern Provinces)
- Trianthema patellitectum A.M.Prescott (Northern Territory, Western Australia)
- Trianthema pilosum F.Muell. (Australia)
- Trianthema portulacastrum L. – Desert horse purslane (many continents)
- Trianthema rhynchocalyptrum F.Muell. (Northern Territory, Queensland)
- Trianthema salsoloides Fenzl ex Oliv. (Angola, Botswana, Cape Provinces, Free State, Kenya, Mozambique, Namibia, Northern Provinces, Sudan, Tanzania))
- Trianthema sanguineum Volkens & Irmsch. (Kenya, Tanzania)
- Trianthema sheilae A.G.Mill. & J.Nyberg (Eritea, Ethiopia, Saudi Arabia, Sudan, Yemen)
- Trianthema triquetrum Willd. ex Spreng. (Sahara to Sahel to South Africa, Indian subcontinent, to Thailand, North-east Jawa to Lesser Sunda Island, Australia)
- Trianthema turgidifolium F.Muell. (Northern Territory, Western Australia)
- Trianthema ufoense H.E.K.Hartmann & Liede (Northern Territory, Queensland, South Australia)
- Trianthema vleiense H.E.K.Hartmann & Liede (Cape Provinces, Free State, Northern Provinces)
