= Trianthema compactum =

Scientific classification
- Kingdom: Plantae
- Clade: Tracheophytes
- Clade: Angiosperms
- Clade: Eudicots
- Order: Caryophyllales
- Family: Aizoaceae
- Genus: Trianthema
- Species: T. compactum

Binomial name
- Trianthema compactum C.T.White

Synonyms
- Trianthema compacta C.T.White orth. var.; Trianthema cypseleoides auct. non (Fenzl) Benth.: Bailey, F.M. (1913)

Species of succulent

Trianthema compactum is a species of flowering plant in the family Aizoaceae and is endemic to near-coastal areas of north-eastern Australia. It is a small herb with oblong to more or less round leaves and flowers arranged singly with five to seven stamens and a short, thick style.

== Description ==
Trianthema compactum is prostrate to ascending, much-branched herb with oblong to more or less round leaves 4–7 mm (0.16–0.28 in) long and wide. The flowers are arranged singly on a pedicel 2–4 mm (0.079–0.157 in) long with an egg-shaped bract at the base. The perianth tube is about 1.5 mm (0.059 in) long with lobes about 2 mm (0.079 in) long. There are five to seven stamens about 1.5 mm (0.059 in) long and a short, thick style. Flowering occurs from March to August.

== Taxonomy ==
Trianthema compactum was first formally described in 1919 by Cyril Tenison White in the Botany Bulletin of the Queensland Department of Agriculture from specimens collected by John Frederick Bailey on Mornington Island.

== Distribution and habitat ==
This plant grows on the shore around the Gulf of Carpentaria in the Northern Territory and Queensland.
