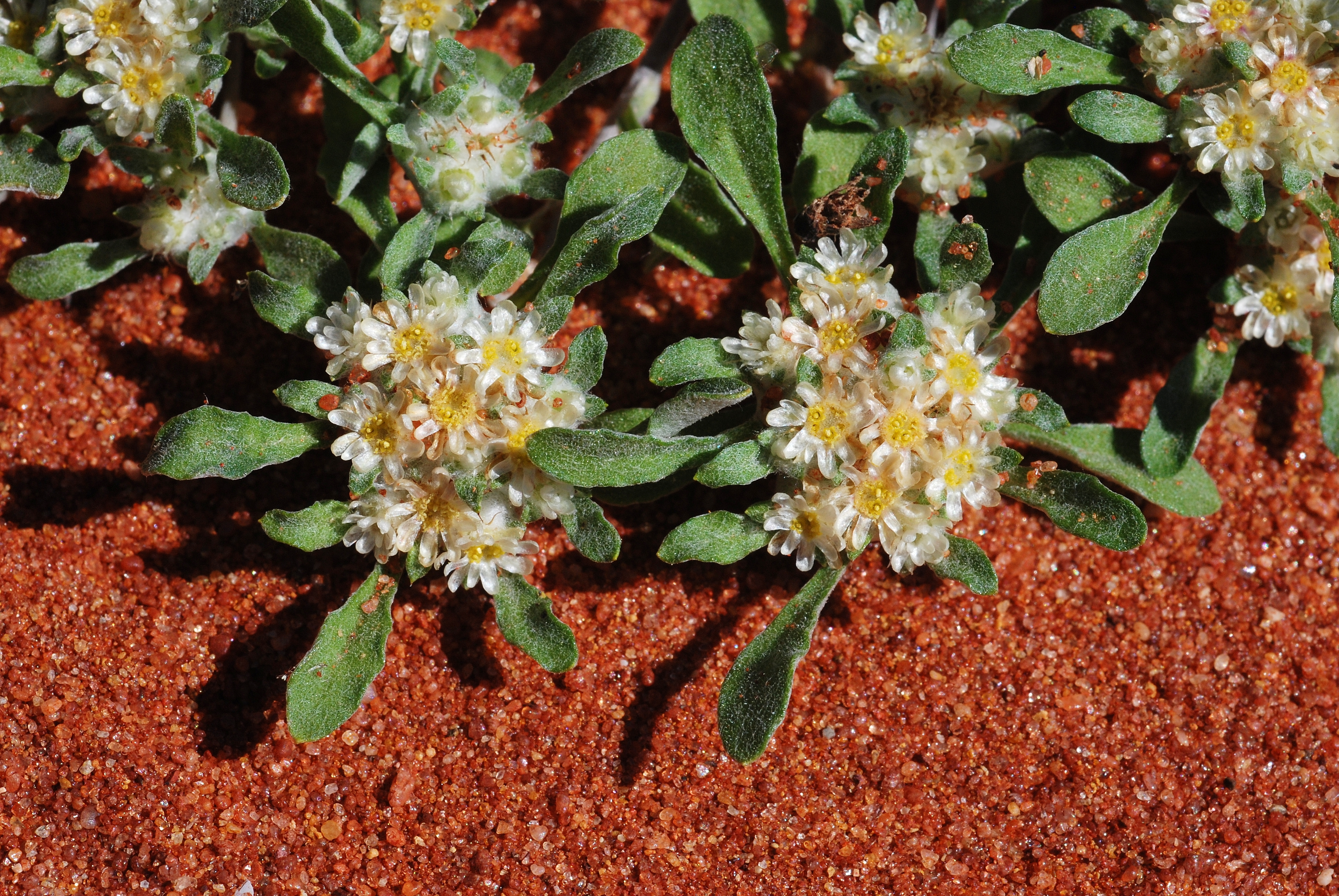

Scientific classification
- Kingdom: Plantae
- Clade: Tracheophytes
- Clade: Angiosperms
- Clade: Eudicots
- Clade: Asterids
- Order: Asterales
- Family: Asteraceae
- Genus: Actinobole
- Species: A. condensatum

Binomial name
- Actinobole condensatum (A.Gray) P.S.Short

Synonyms
- Gnaphalodes condensata A.Gray

= Actinobole condensatum =

Species of flowering plant

Actinobole condensatum is a dwarf annual herb, endemic to Western Australia.

It produces white, cream or yellow flowers between August and October in its native range.
