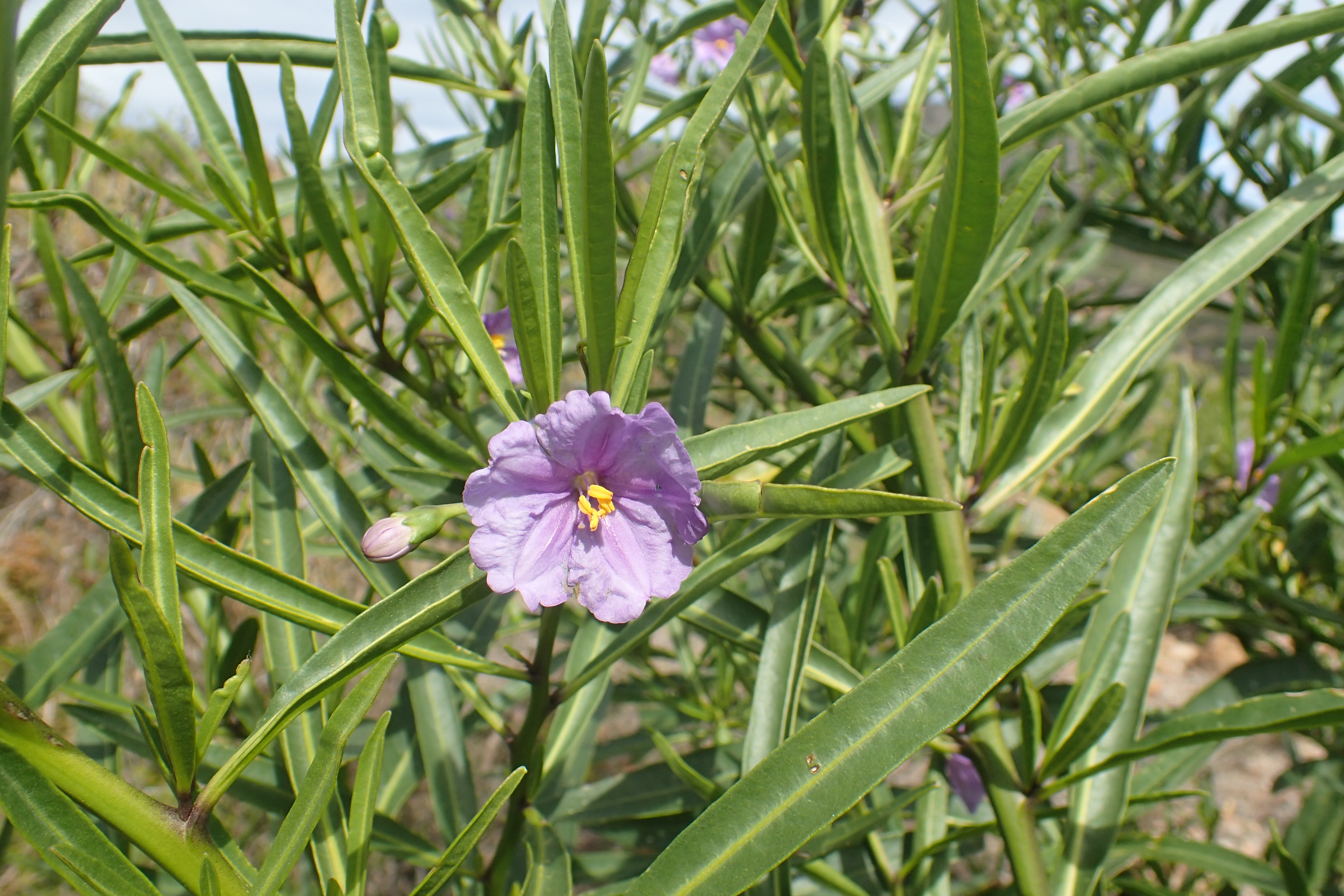

Scientific classification
- Kingdom: Plantae
- Clade: Tracheophytes
- Clade: Angiosperms
- Clade: Eudicots
- Clade: Asterids
- Order: Solanales
- Family: Solanaceae
- Genus: Solanum
- Species: S. symonii

Binomial name
- Solanum symonii H.Eichler

Synonyms
- Solanum fasciculatum F.Muell. nom. illeg.; Solanum simile var. fasciculatum Domin; Solanum simile var. fastigiatum Domin orth. var.

= Solanum symonii =

Species of flowering plant

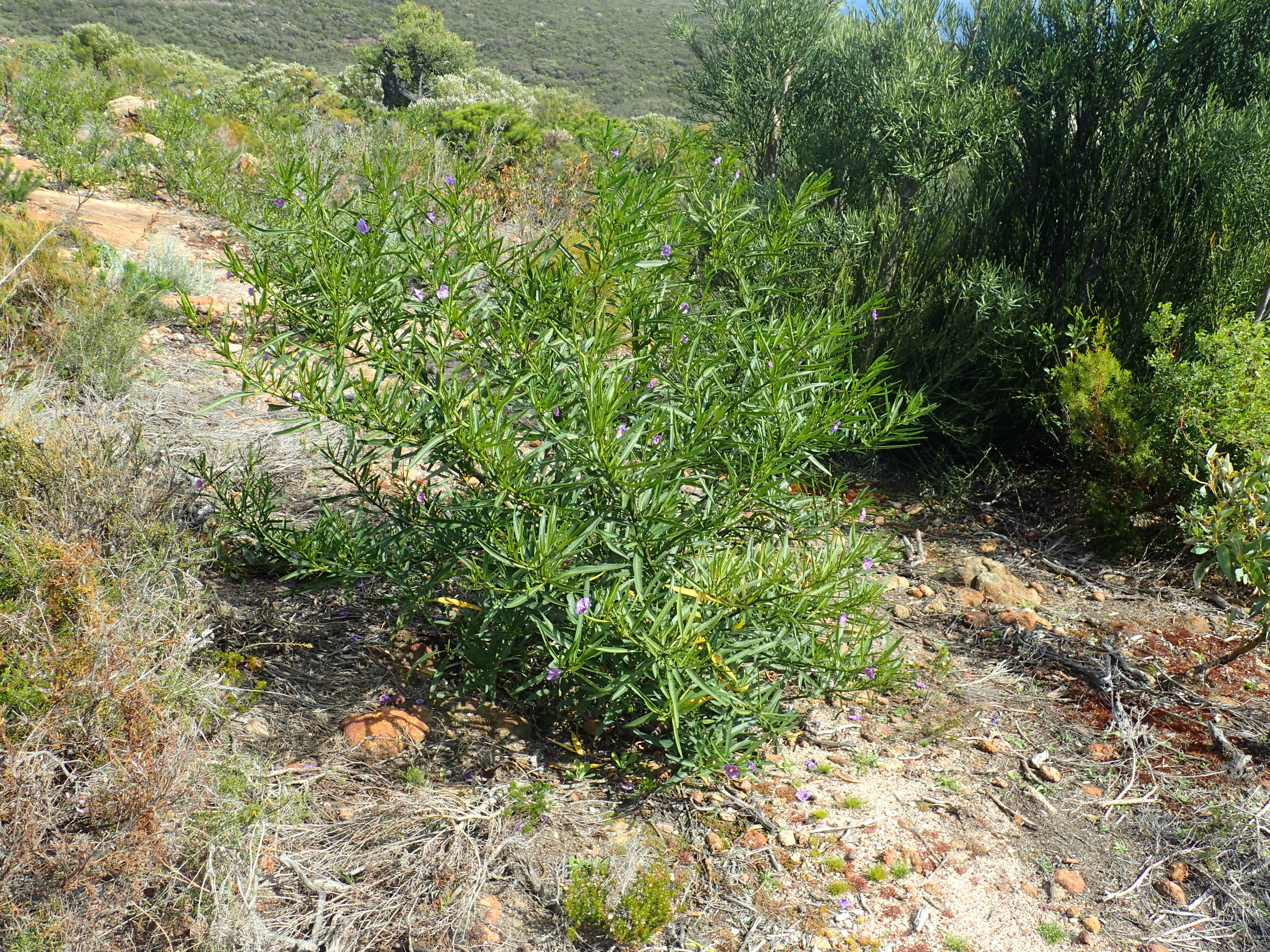
Habit in the Cape Le Grand National Park

Solanum symonii is a species of flowering plant in the family Solanaceae and is native to near-coastal areas of Western Australia and South Australia. It is an erect shrub with egg-shaped to lance-shaped leaves and pale lavender-purple flowers.

== Description ==
Solanum symonii is an erect or spreading, softly-wooded shrub that typically grows to a height of 0.7–2 m (2 ft 4 in – 6 ft 7 in) and is more or less glabrous apart from a few hairs on its growing points. The leaves are egg-shaped to lance-shaped, 100–180 mm (3.9–7.1 in) long and 30–80 mm (1.2–3.1 in) wide on a petiole 20–30 mm (0.79–1.18 in) long. The leaves lack prickles and are shallowly lobed. The flowers are borne in groups of two to six on a peduncle up to 30 mm (1.2 in) long, the rachis 50 mm (2.0 in) long, each flower on a pedicel 10–20 mm (0.39–0.79 in) long. The sepals are broadly triangular, 4–5 mm (0.16–0.20 in) long, the sepal lobes about 2 mm (0.079 in) long, the petals pale lavender-purple and 30–40 mm (1.2–1.6 in) long with notched lobes. Flowering occurs throughout the year with a peak from July to October, and the fruit is an oval to egg-shaped berry 15–20 mm (0.59–0.79 in) long.

== Taxonomy ==
This species was first formally described in 1859 by Ferdinand von Mueller who gave it the name Solanum fasciculatum in Fragmenta Phytographiae Australiae from specimens collected near the Phillips River. Mueller's name was illegitimate because it had already been used for a different species (Solanum fasciculatum Vell., now known as Athenaea fasciculata). In 1963, Hansjörg Eichler changed the name to Solanum symonii in the journalTaxon. The specific epithet (symonii) honours David Eric Symon.

== Distribution and habitat ==
Solanum symonii grows in sandy soil on coastal limestone and sand dunes from Geraldton in north-western Western Australia to the Yorke Peninsula in South Australia.
