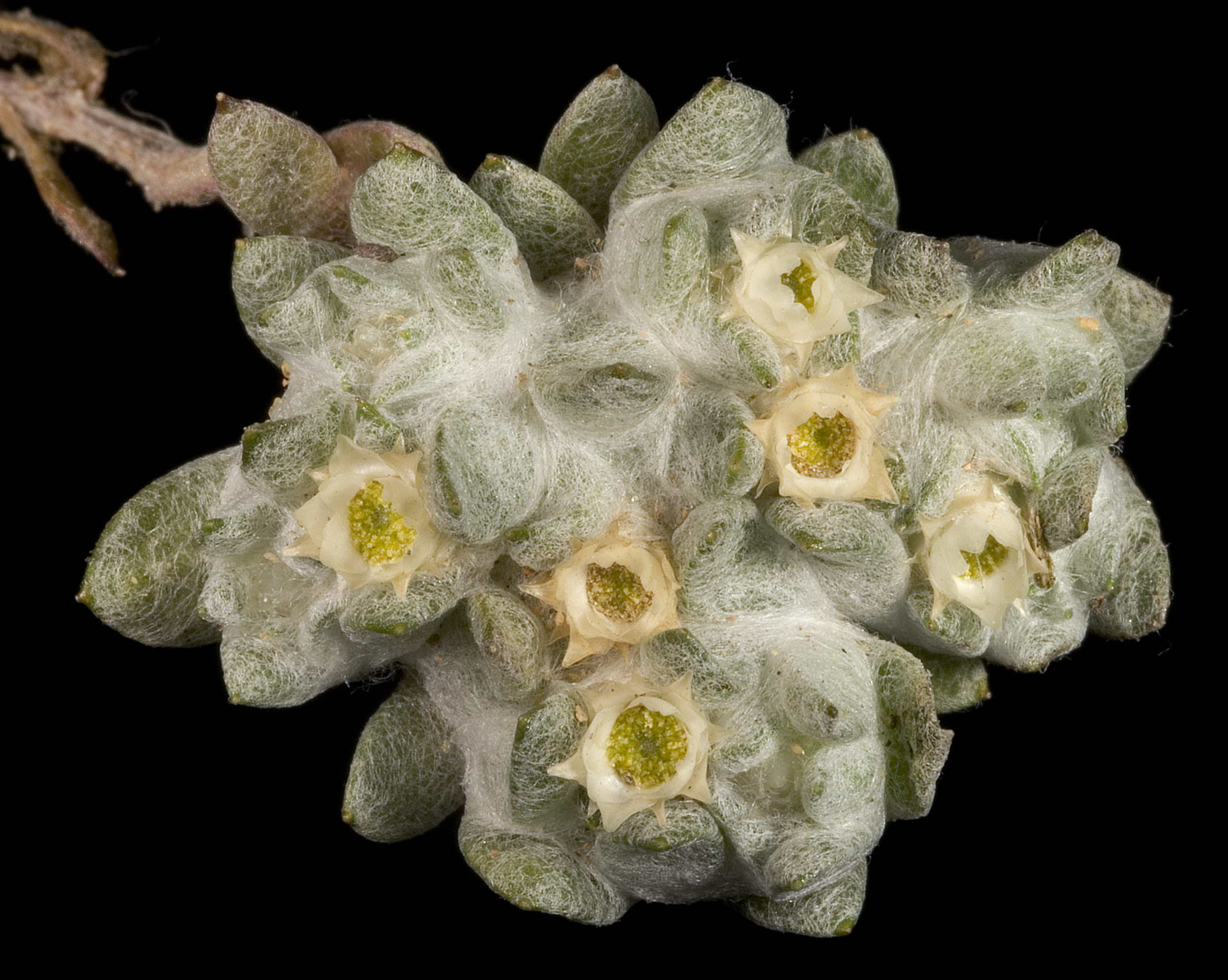

Scientific classification
- Kingdom: Plantae
- Clade: Tracheophytes
- Clade: Angiosperms
- Clade: Eudicots
- Clade: Asterids
- Order: Asterales
- Family: Asteraceae
- Genus: Actinobole
- Species: A. uliginosum

Binomial name
- Actinobole uliginosum (A.Gray) H.Eichler

Synonyms
- Gnaphalodes evacina Sond.; Gnaphalodes evacinum Sond. orth. var.; Gnaphalodes uliginosa A.Gray; Gnaphalodes uliginosum A.Gray [orth. var.]

= Actinobole uliginosum =

Flannel cudweed

Species of flowering plant

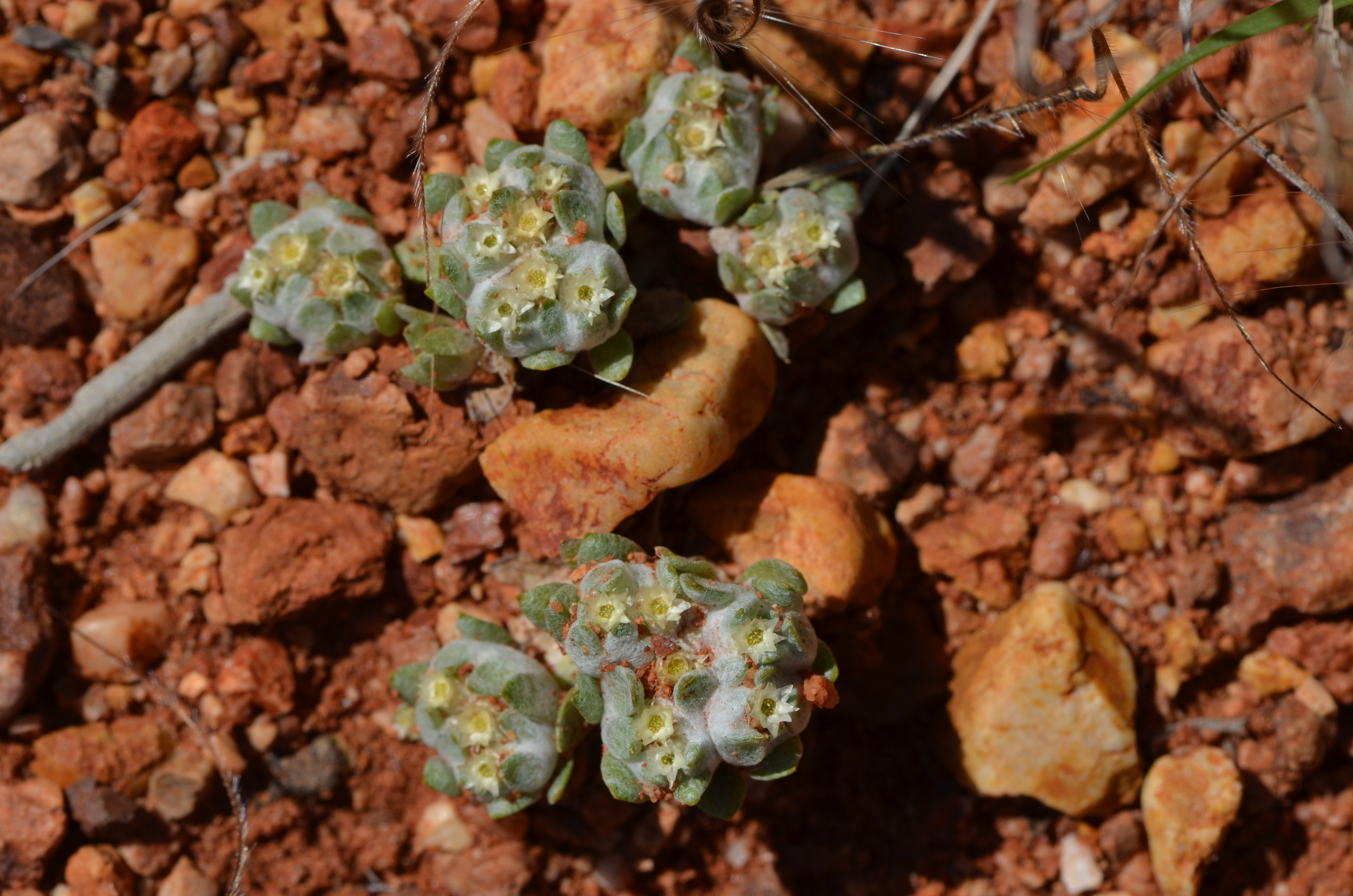
Habit near Bourke, NSW

Actinobole uliginosum commonly known as flannel cudweed, camel dung and cotton weed, is a species of dwarf annual herb in the family Asteraceae. It is a small, prostrate annual forb and grows in all mainland states of Australia.

== Description ==
Actinobole uliginosum is a small, prostrate, woolly, annual forb with greyish, cottony variable leaves 3–13 mm (0.12–0.51 in) long, 1.5–5 mm (0.059–0.197 in) wide, tapering at the base on stems up to 1–10 cm (0.39–3.94 in) long. Flowers are borne singly or in a cluster of 1 or 2–12, depressed, wide, flattened, about 5–10 mm (0.20–0.39 in) high, 6–18 mm (0.24–0.71 in) in diameter, yellow without petals, corolla 2–2.5 mm (0.079–0.098 in) long. Leaves are oblong and surround the flower heads, leaf-like bracts in rows and woolly. Flowering occurs from August to December and the fruit is a cypsela almost obovoid, bristly, yellowish and about 0.8 mm (0.031 in) long.

== Taxonomy ==
This species was described 1852 by Asa Gray who gave it the name Gnaphalodes uliginosa in Hooker's Journal of Botany and Kew Garden Miscellany from specimens collected by James Drummond in the Swan River Colony. In 1963 Hansjörg Eichler changed the name to Actinobole uliginosum and the change was published in the journal Taxon.

== Habitat/ecology ==
Flannel cudweed is found on sandy, loamy and granitic soils in a variety of habitats throughout inland Australia.
