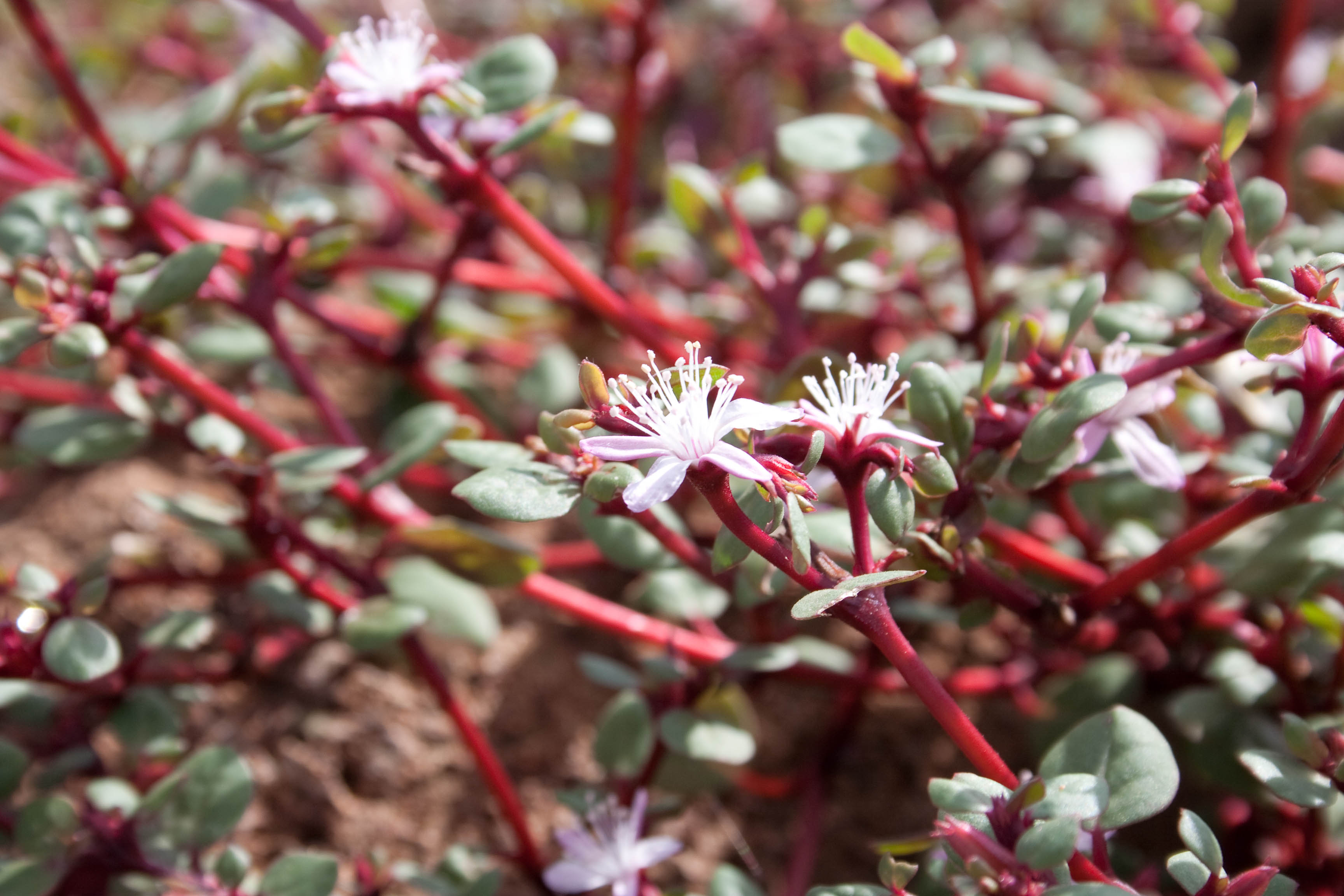

Conservation status
- Secure (NatureServe)

Scientific classification
- Kingdom: Plantae
- Clade: Tracheophytes
- Clade: Angiosperms
- Clade: Eudicots
- Order: Caryophyllales
- Family: Aizoaceae
- Genus: Trianthema
- Species: T. portulacastrum

Binomial name
- Trianthema portulacastrum L.

= Trianthema portulacastrum =

Species of succulent

Trianthema portulacastrum is a species of flowering plant in the ice plant family known by the common names desert horsepurslane, black pigweed, and giant pigweed. It is native to areas of several continents, including Africa and North and South America, and present as an introduced species in many other areas. It grows in a wide variety of habitat types and it can easily take hold in disturbed areas and cultivated land as a weed.

This species is a host plant for the beet leafhopper (Circulifer tenellus).

== Description ==
It is an annual herb forming a prostrate mat or clump with stems up to a meter long. It is green to red in color, hairless except for small lines of hairs near the leaves, and fleshy. The leaves have small round or oval blades up to 4 centimeters long borne on short petioles. Solitary flowers occur in leaf axils. The flower lacks petals but has purple, petallike sepals. The fruit is a curved, cylindrical capsule emerging from the stem. It is up to half a centimeter long and has two erect, pointed wings on top, where the capsule opens.

Seed dispersal occurs in a number of ways. One seed may be carried on the detached cap of the fruit, which floats on water. Other seeds may fall out of the remaining part of the fruit or remain on the plant after it dies and withers, resprouting the following season.
