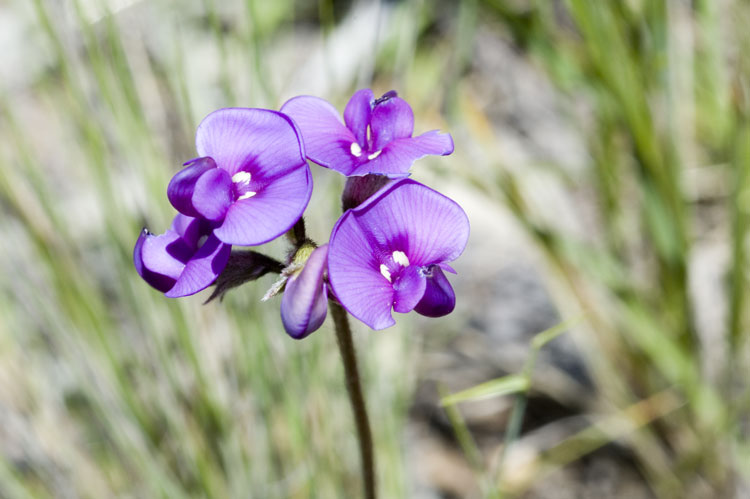

Scientific classification
- Kingdom: Plantae
- Clade: Tracheophytes
- Clade: Angiosperms
- Clade: Eudicots
- Clade: Rosids
- Order: Fabales
- Family: Fabaceae
- Subfamily: Faboideae
- Genus: Swainsona
- Species: S. sericea

Binomial name
- Swainsona sericea (A.T.Lee) J.M.Black ex H.Eichler

= Swainsona sericea =

Silky Swainson-pea

Species of plant

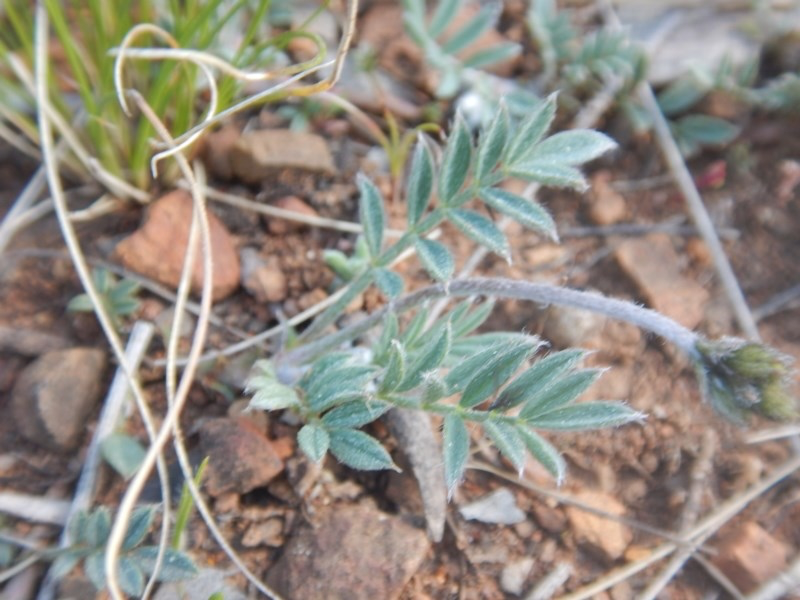
Leaves

Swainsona sericea commonly known as silky Swainson-pea or silky pea, is a flowering plant in the family Fabaceae. It is a small perennial with greyish-green leaves, purple flowers and grows in New South Wales, Victoria and South Australia.

== Description ==
Swainsona sericea is an upright or prostrate, sparsely branched perennial plant about 10 cm (3.9 in) high with stems thickly covered in soft hairs. The leaves are greyish-green, up to 7 cm (2.8 in) long, narrowly oblong, 5-13 leaflets to 1.5 cm (0.59 in) long, densely hairy, pointed at the tip, apex leaflet considerably longer, upper and lower surfaces more or less covered with short, soft, silky hairs and stipules 3–7 mm (0.12–0.28 in) long. The raceme usually consists of 2-8 pea-shaped flowers 7–11 mm (0.28–0.43 in) long, corolla purple, covered with soft hairs, keel 7–10 mm (0.28–0.39 in) long, standard petal broadly egg-shaped, 8–14 mm (0.31–0.55 in) long, 8–14 mm (0.31–0.55 in) wide and the flowers stems about 5 mm (0.20 in) long. Flowering occurs from August to October and the fruit is an oval-shaped pod, hairy, up to 1.7 cm (0.67 in) long and ending in a point.

== Taxonomy and naming ==
This species was described in 1948 by Alma Theodora Lee and given the name Swainsona oreboides subsp. sericea. In 1968 H.Eichler changed the name to Swainsona sericea from an unpublished description by J.M.Black and the description was published in Supplement to J.M.Black's Flora of South Australia. The specific epithet (sericea) means "silky".

== Distribution and habitat ==
Silky Swanson-pea grows in grassland and grassy woodland in Victoria, New South Wales and South Australia.
