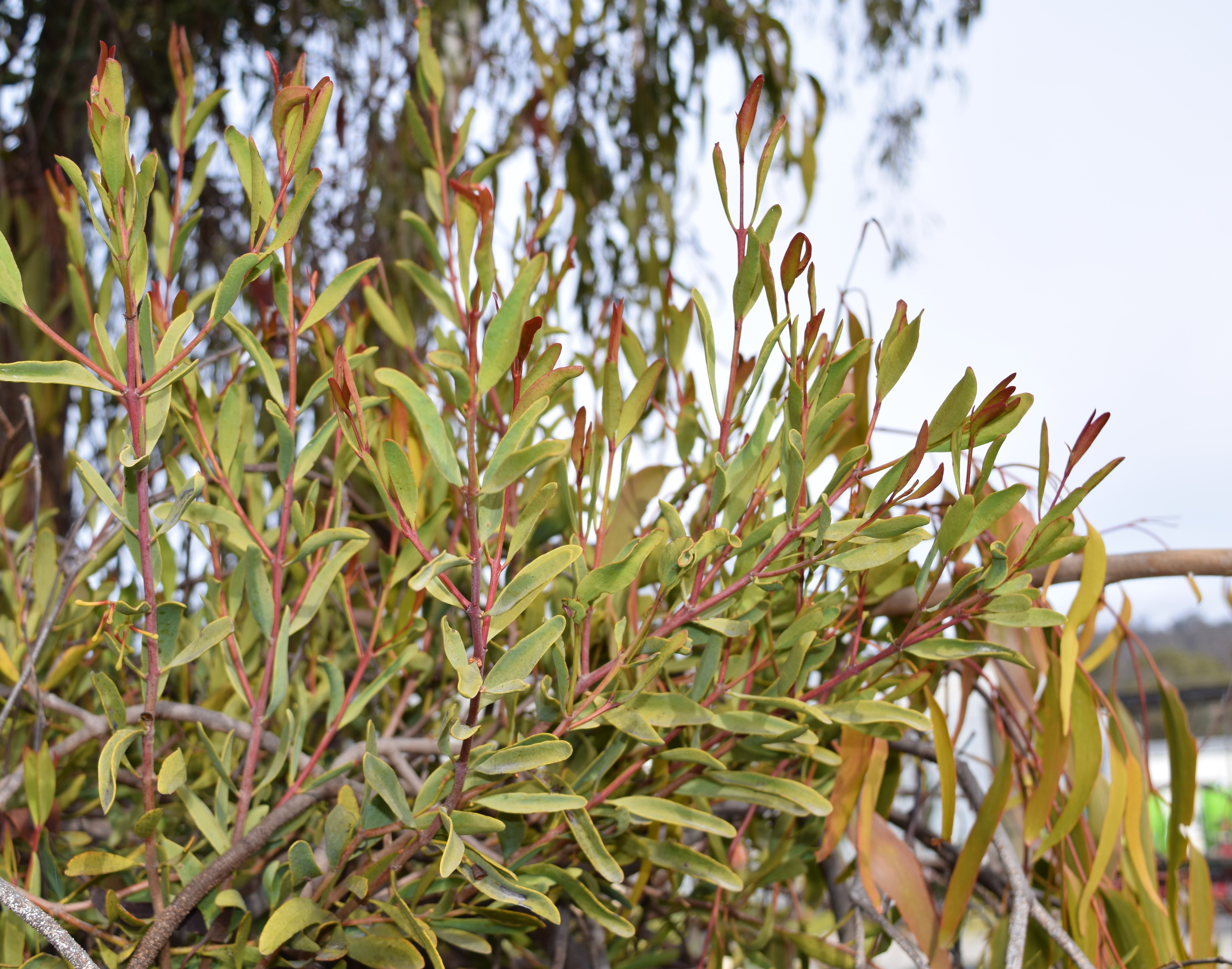

Scientific classification
- Kingdom: Plantae
- Clade: Tracheophytes
- Clade: Angiosperms
- Clade: Eudicots
- Order: Santalales
- Family: Loranthaceae
- Genus: Amyema
- Species: A. miraculosa

Binomial name
- Amyema miraculosa (Lehm. ex Miq.) Tiegh.
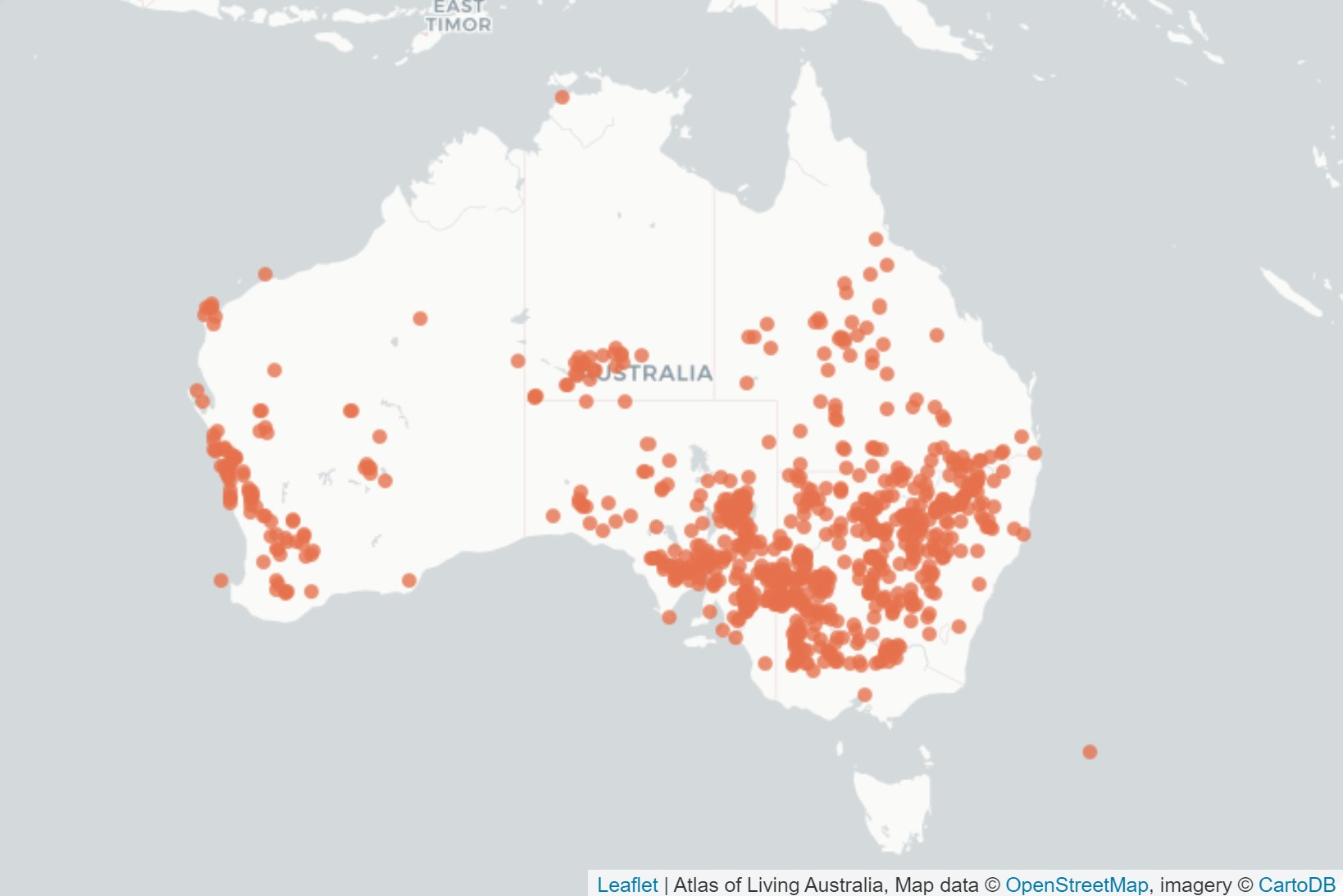
- Distribution of A. miraculosa from the Atas of Living Australia

Synonyms
- Amyema miraculosum

= Amyema miraculosa =

Species of plant

Amyema miraculosa, also known as the fleshy mistletoe and the round-leaf mistletoe, is an Australian native mistletoe found in all states except Tasmania. It is a woody, hemiparasitic plant, in the Loranthaceae family. Being hemiparasitic, it draws water and minerals from its host, however it photosynthesises to manufacture its own supply of carbohydrates.

The plant has thick, fleshy leaves with rounded tips. It has dark red flowers which are carried in groups of three and the fruit is a narrow shaped yellow berry. It forms dense, upright clumps and is often found parasitising other parasitic plants, making it an epiparasite. It has been recorded utilising a total of 41 different species as hosts, however its preferred hosts are from the Santalum family and other Loranthaceae species.

There are two subspecies within Australia. A. miraculosa subsp. boormanii which is predominantly in the eastern half of the continent while A. miraculosa subsp. miraculosa is present mainly in Western Australia.

== Ecology and animal interactions ==
With its tubular red flowers, the pollination of A. miraculosa is predominantly via birds. Once the fruit has set, it is then dispersed by a different suite of birds of which the main species is the mistletoe bird (Dicaeum hirundinaceum). The seed passes quickly through the gut of the bird and if it is deposited on a branch of a suitable species, the seed will grow into a new plant. A. miraculosa is also a host plant for butterflies and their caterpillars

== Taxonomy ==
Fleshy mistletoe was first described in 1845 by Dutch botanist Friedrich Anton Wilhelm Miquel as Loranthus miraculosus and was transferred to Amyema by French botanist Phillipe Édouard Léon Van Teighem in 1895.

== Gallery ==
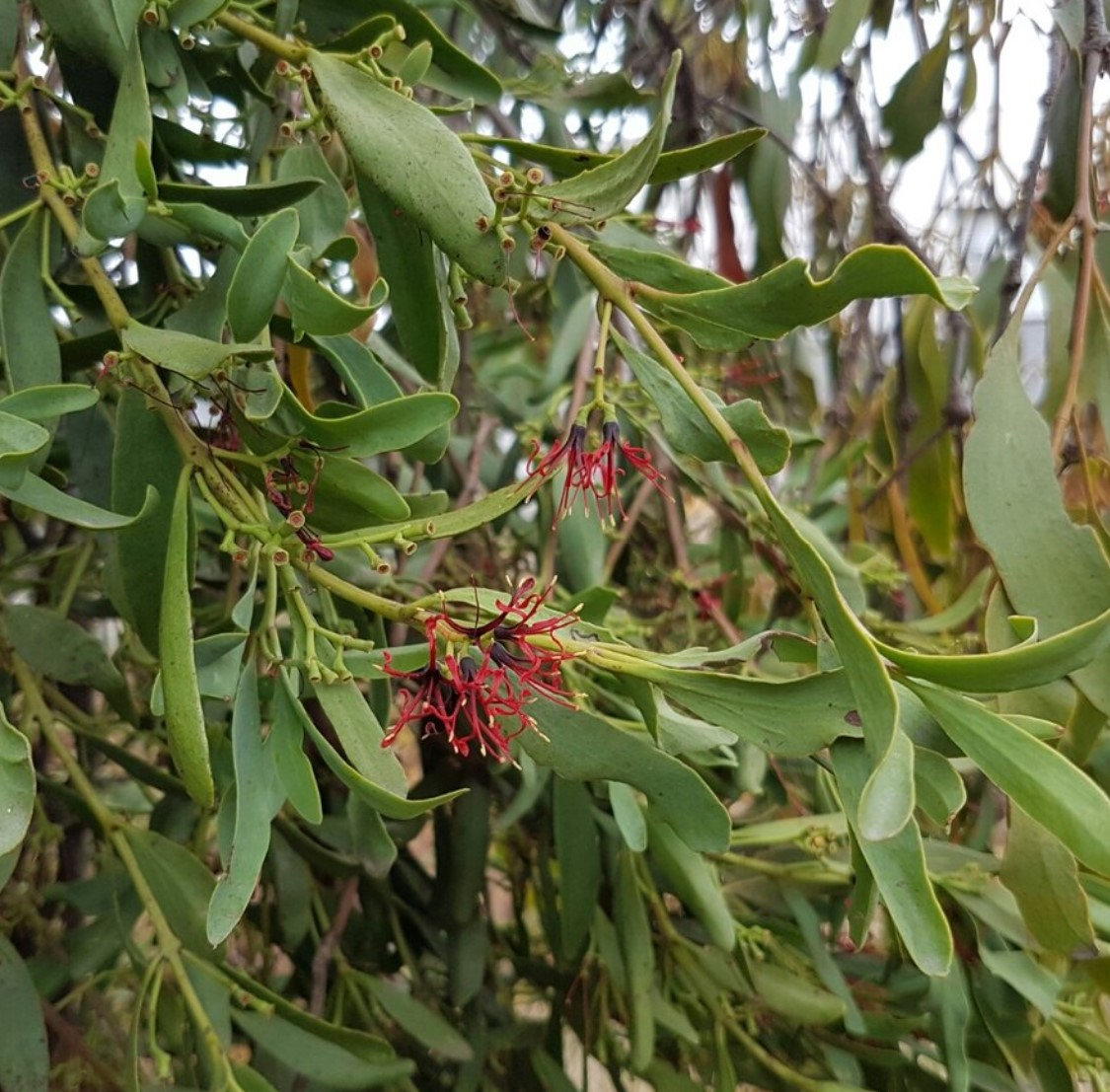

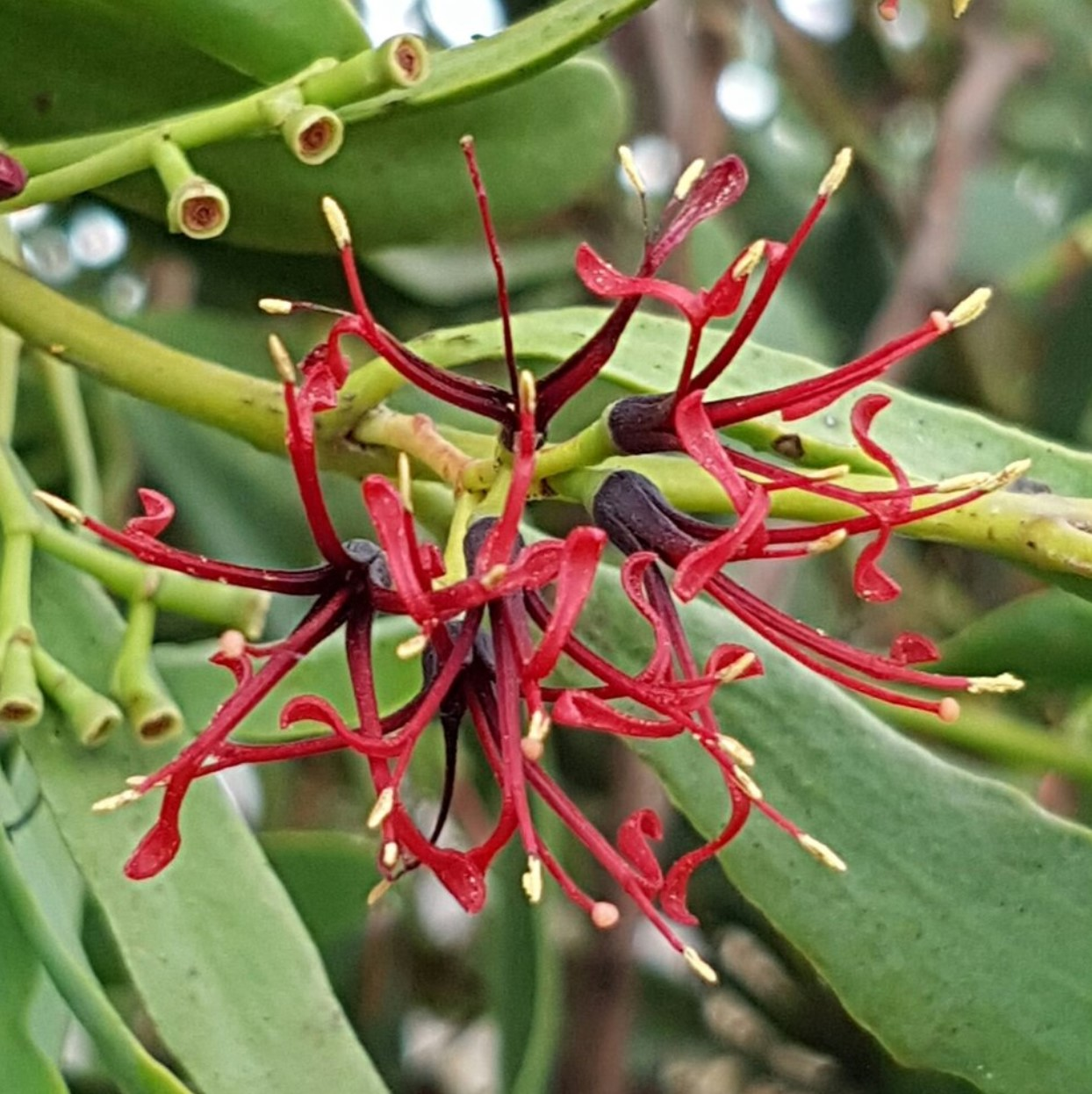

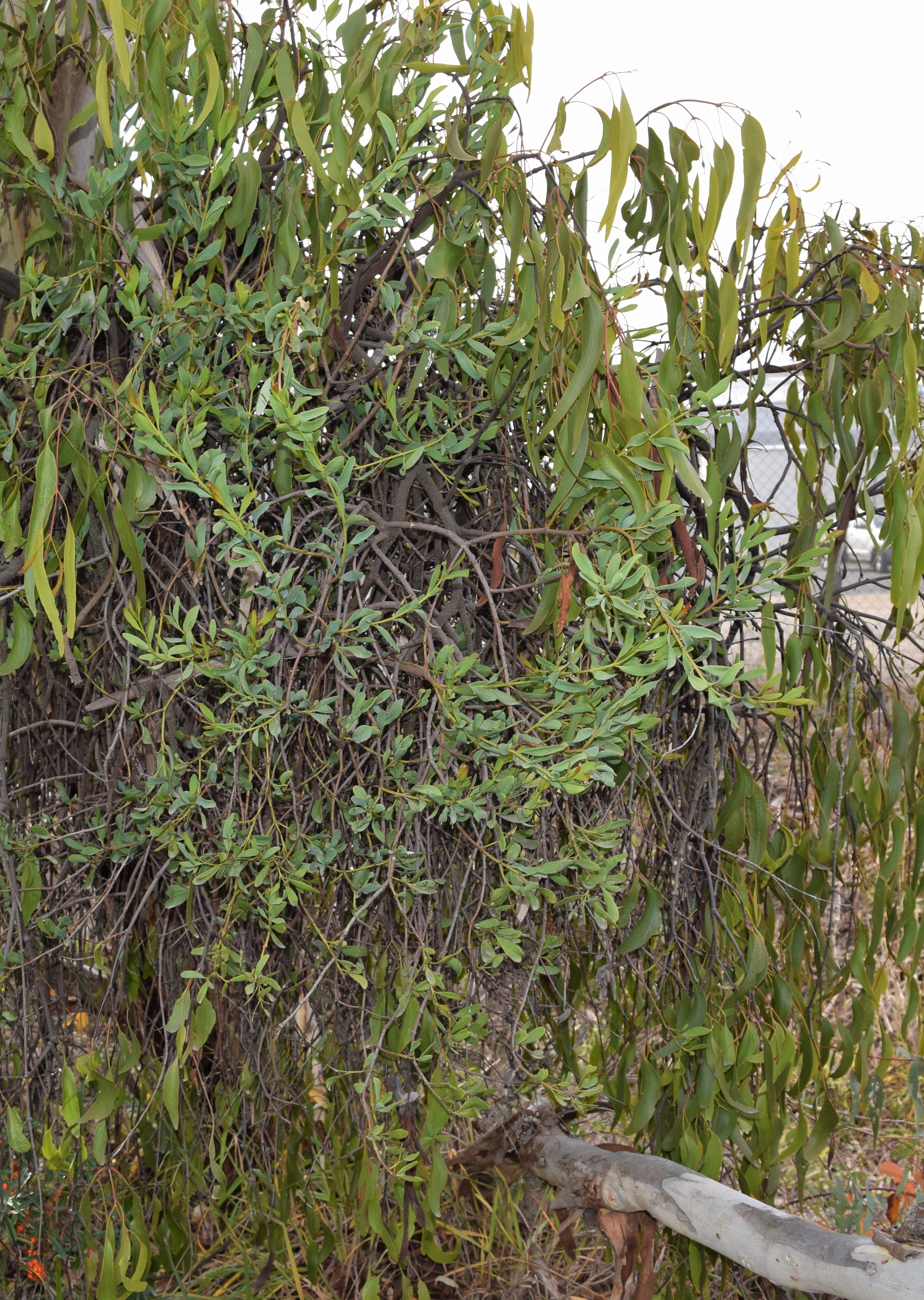

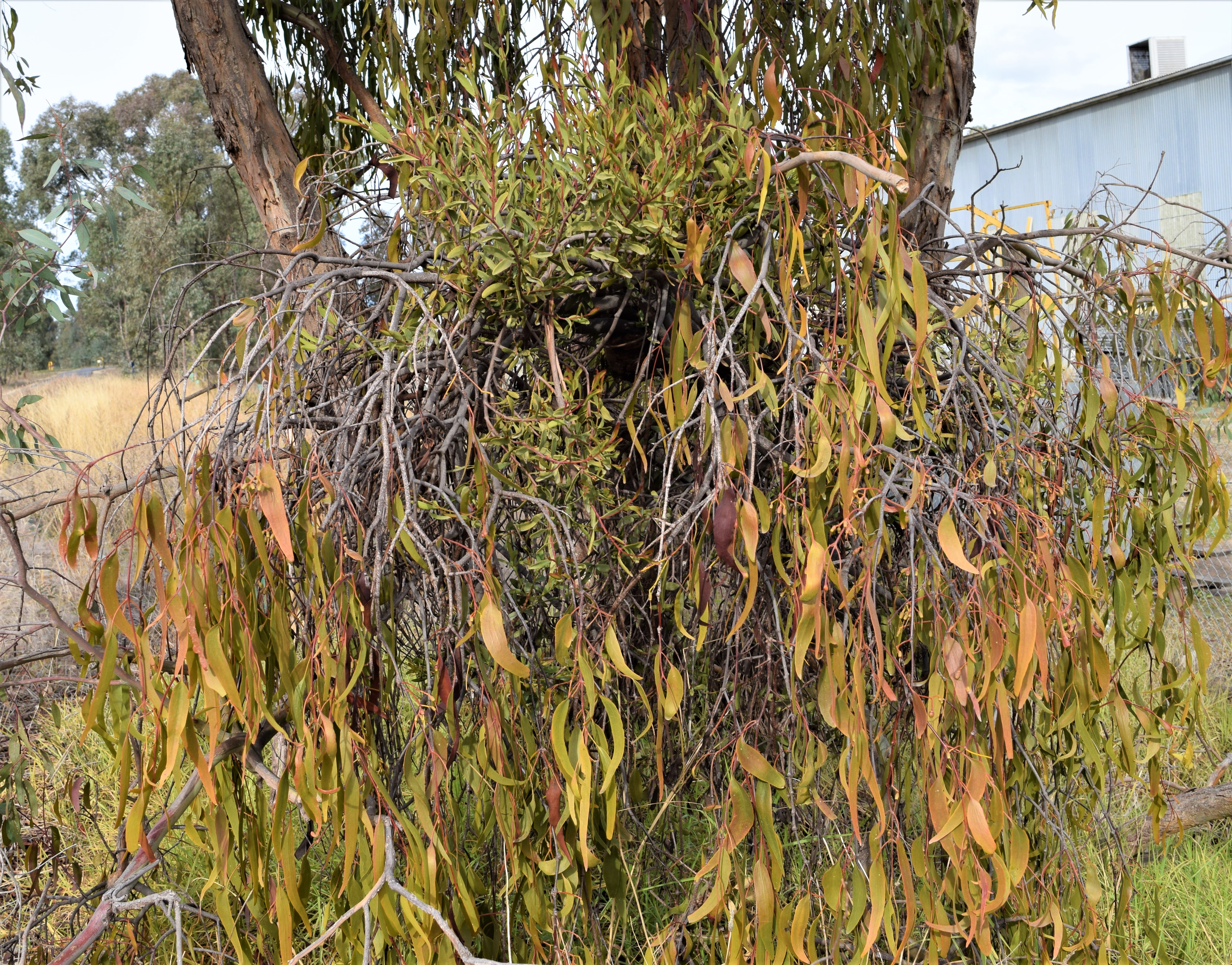
