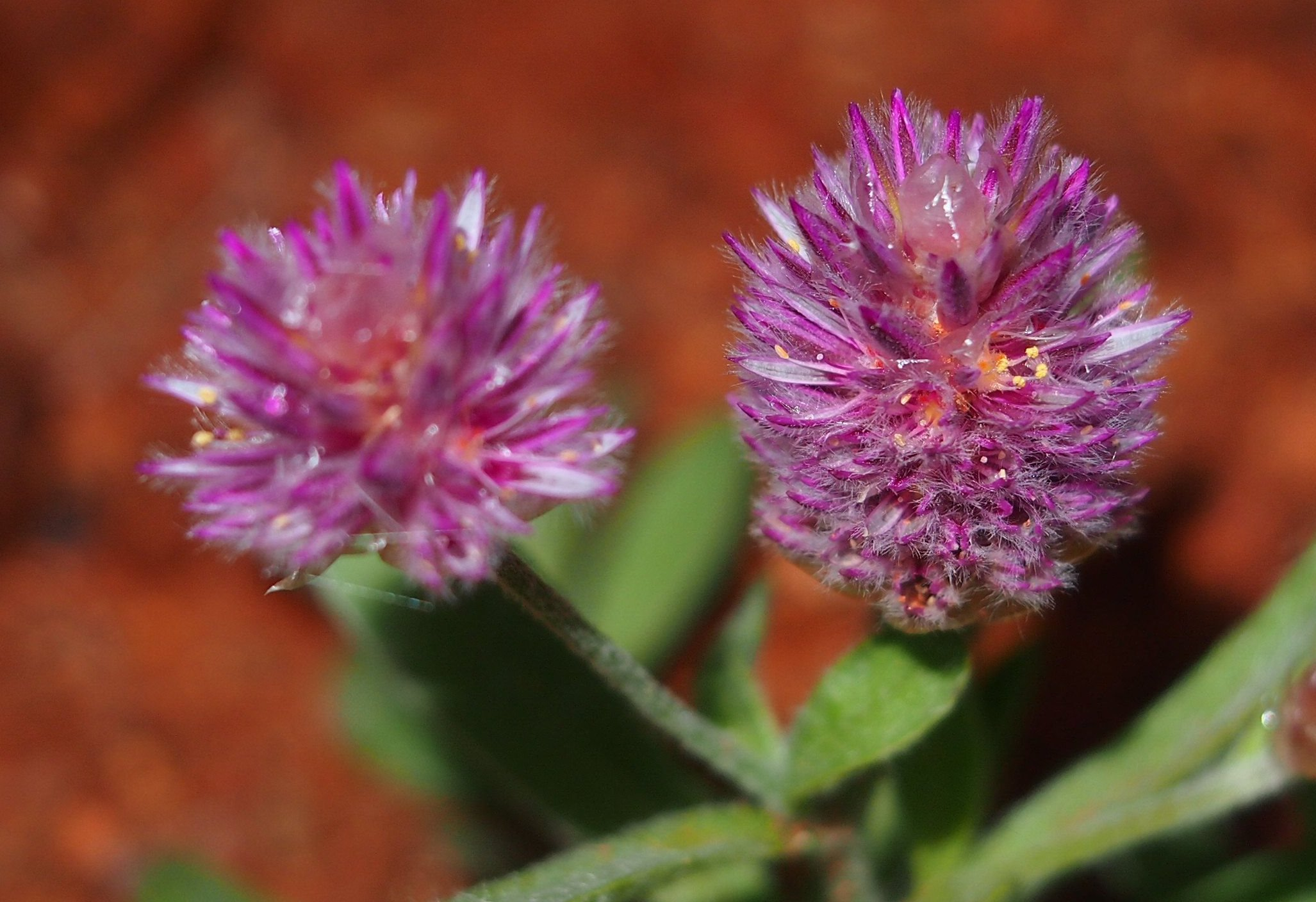

Scientific classification
- Kingdom: Plantae
- Clade: Tracheophytes
- Clade: Angiosperms
- Clade: Eudicots
- Order: Caryophyllales
- Family: Amaranthaceae
- Genus: Ptilotus
- Species: P. helipteroides

Binomial name
- Ptilotus helipteroides (F.Muell.) F.Muell.

Synonyms
- Ptilotus helipteroides (F.Muell.) F.Muell. var. helipteroides; Trichinium brachytrichum F.Muell.; Trichinium helipteroides F.Muell.; Trichinium helipteroides F.Muell. var. helipteroides

= Ptilotus helipteroides =

Species of grass-like plant

Ptilotus helipteroides, commonly known as hairy mulla mulla or woolly tails, is a species of flowering plant in the family Amaranthaceae and is endemic to arid parts of Australia. It is an erect to ascending annual herb, with sessile, linear, elliptic or lance-shaped leaves and oval, cylindrical or hemispherical pink or magenta spikes of flowers.

== Description ==
Ptilotus helipteroides is an erect to ascending annual herb, that typically grows to a height of up to 60 cm (24 in), its stems and leaves with a medium to dense covering of simple hairs. Its leaves are sessile, linear, elliptic or lance-shaped, sometimes with the narrower end towards the base, mostly 5–70 mm (0.20–2.76 in) long and 2–10 mm (0.079–0.394 in) wide. The flowers are arranged in oval, cylindrical or hemispherical spikes up to 30 mm (1.2 in) long and 14–21 mm (0.55–0.83 in) wide, with colourless, glabrous bracts 6.8–7.2 mm (0.27–0.28 in) long and similar bracteoles 3.8–5 mm (0.15–0.20 in) long. The outer tepals are 8.2–9.2 mm (0.32–0.36 in) long and the inner tepals 7.5–8.7 mm (0.30–0.34 in) long. There are 4 stamens and 1 staminode, the style is 3.0–3.6 mm (0.12–0.14 in) long and curved, fixed to the side of the ovary. Flowering occurs from April to October.

== Taxonomy ==
This species was first formally described in 1862 by Ferdinand von Mueller who gave it the name Trichinium helipteroides in his Fragmenta Phytographiae Australiae. In 1868, vom Mueller transferred the species to Ptilotus as P. helipteroides in a later edition of Fragmenta Phytographiae Australiae. The specific epithet (helipteroides) means 'Helipterum-like'.

== Distribution and habitat ==
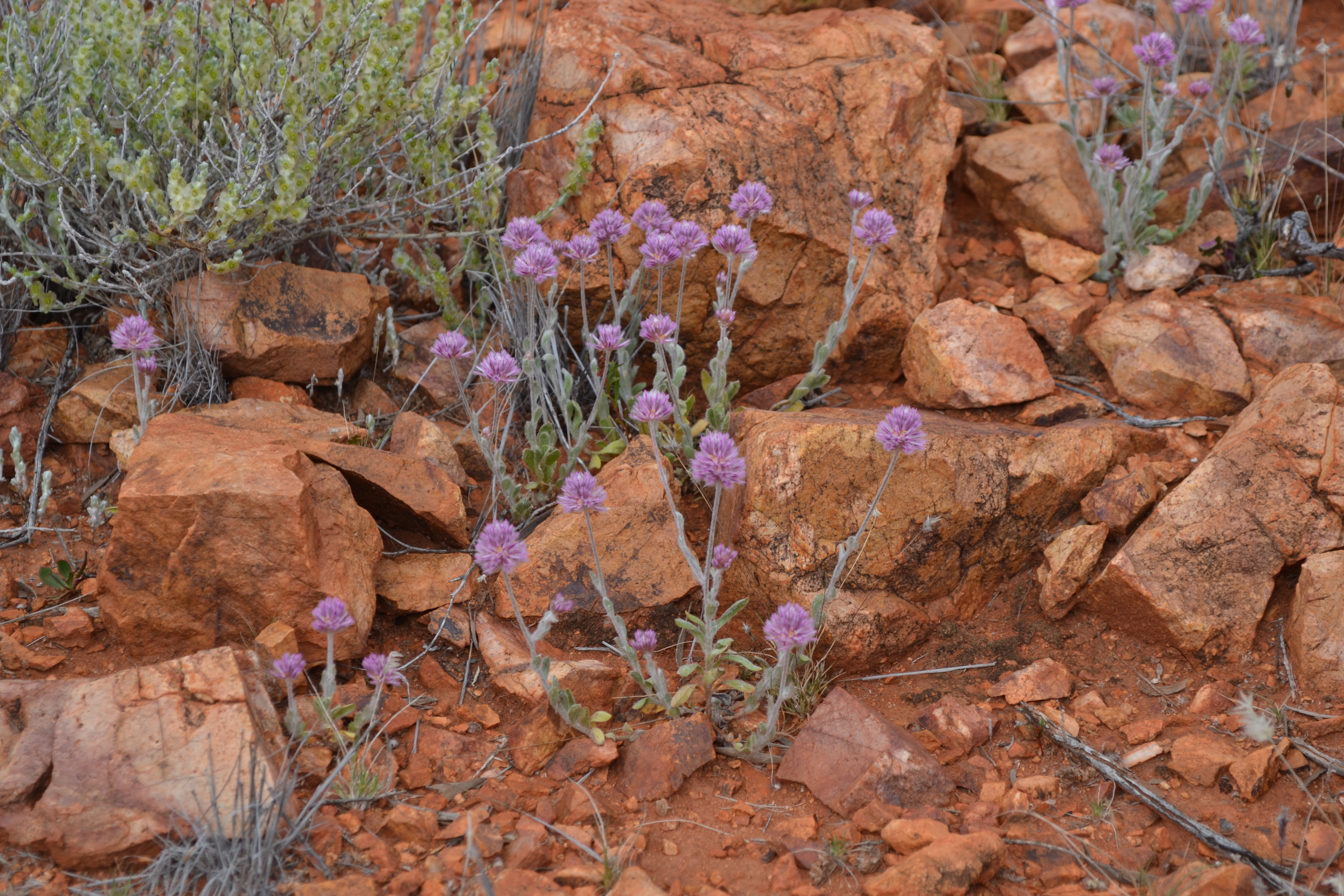
Habit

Ptilotus helipteroides grows on red, stony sand, and sandy loam and is widespread across arid Australia, from the west coast of Western Australia, the south of the Northern Territory and northern South Australia to Boulia in Western Queensland.

== See also ==
- List of Ptilotus species
