= Atriplex leptocarpa =

Scientific classification
- Kingdom: Plantae
- Clade: Tracheophytes
- Clade: Angiosperms
- Clade: Eudicots
- Order: Caryophyllales
- Family: Amaranthaceae
- Genus: Atriplex
- Species: A. leptocarpa

Binomial name
- Atriplex leptocarpa F.Muell.

Synonyms
- Atriplex leptocarpa var. armata Aellen; Atriplex leptocarpa f. gracilis Aellen; Atriplex leptocarpa var. inermis Aellen; Obione leptocarpa (F.Muell.) G.L.Chu

Species of plant in the amaranth family

Atriplex leptocarpa, the slender-fruit saltbush, is a species of flowering plant in the family Amaranthaceae, native to Australia (except the Northern Territory and Tasmania), and introduced to Eritrea. It is typically found growing near rivers, lakes, and other periodically flooded areas.
