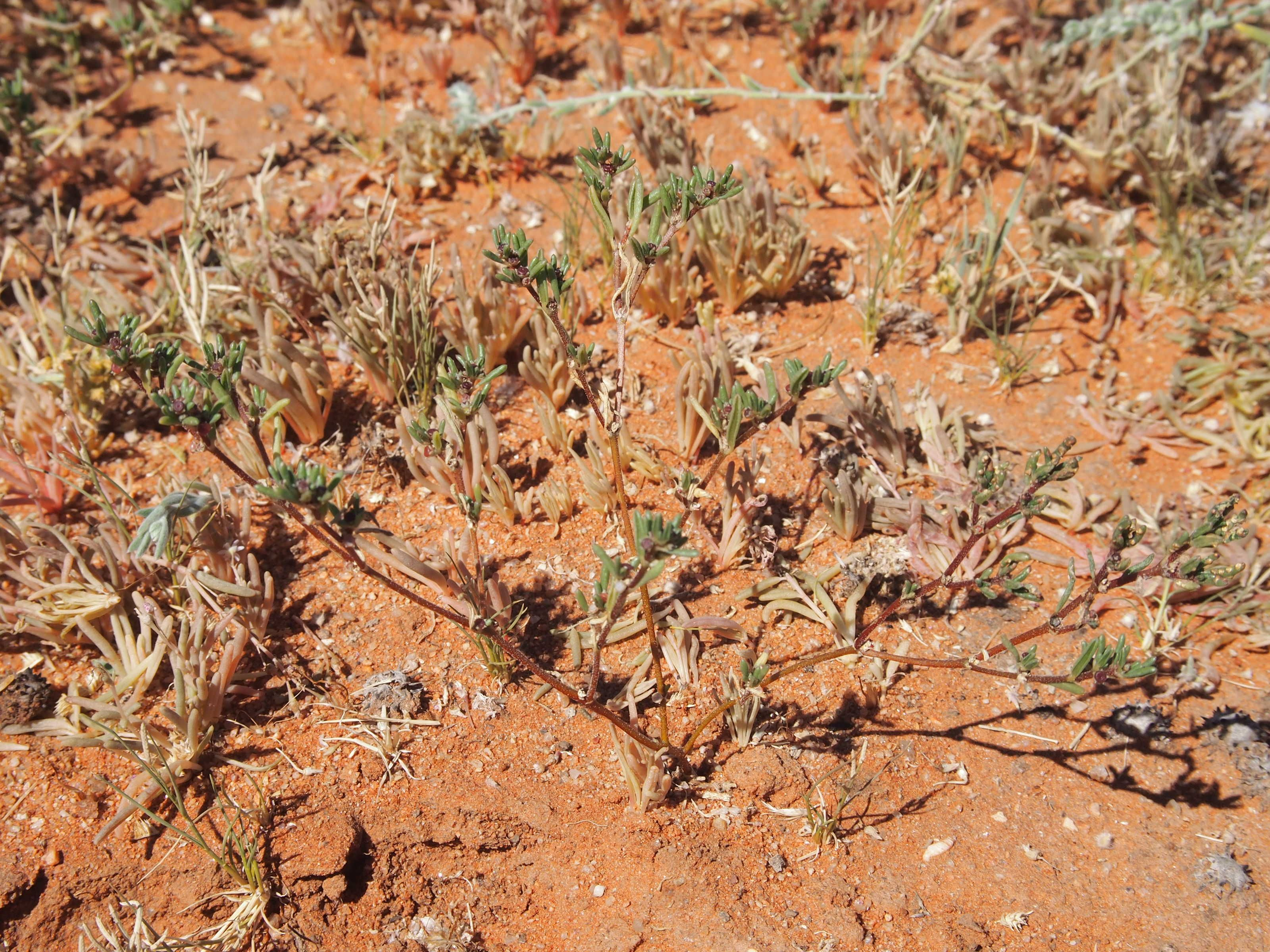
- near Narran Lake Nature Reserve

Scientific classification
- Kingdom: Plantae
- Clade: Tracheophytes
- Clade: Angiosperms
- Clade: Eudicots
- Order: Caryophyllales
- Family: Aizoaceae
- Genus: Trianthema
- Species: T. triquetrum

Binomial name
- Trianthema triquetrum Willd. ex Spreng.

Synonyms
- Trianthema glandulosum Peter; Trianthema glaucifolium F.Muell. Trianthema sedifolium Vis.

= Trianthema triquetrum =

Species of plant

Trianthema triquetrum (orthographic variant Trianthema triquetra) is a plant in the Aizoaceae family, found in the Sahara, the Sahel, South Africa, the Indian subcontinent, Thailand, Indonesia and all the mainland states and territories of Australia, except Victoria.

It was first described by Carl Ludwig Willdenow in 1803.

The species epithet, triquetrum, is a Latin adjective, which describes the plant as having three corners.
