= Anstey Hill Recreation Park =

Protected park in South Australia

- IUCN category III (natural monument or feature)
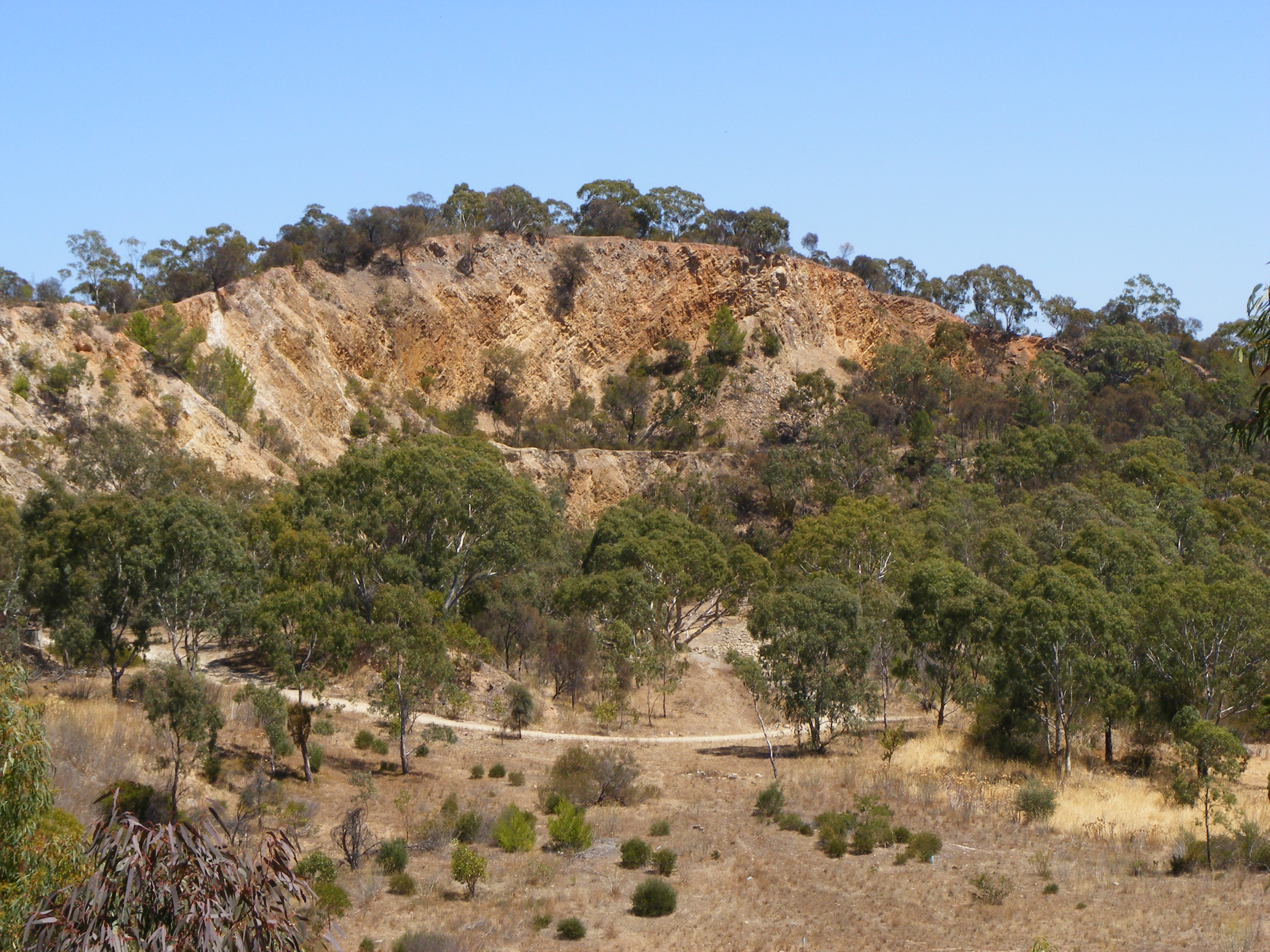
- Quarry in the northwest of Anstey Hill Recreation Park

- Location within South Australia
- Location: South Australia
- Nearest city: Adelaide
- Coordinates: 34°49′50.38″S 138°44′15.45″E
- Area: 3.62 km^{2} (1.40 sq mi)
- Established: 31 August 1989
- Governing body: Department for Environment and Water
- Website: http://www.environment.sa.gov.au/parks/Find_a_Park/Browse_by_region/Adelaide/Anstey_Hill_Recreation_Park

Anstey Hill Recreation Park is a 362-hectare (890-acre) protected area established in 1989 and located approximately 19 kilometres (12 mi) northeast of Adelaide, South Australia. The park is a significant reserve of bushland in the foothills of the Mount Lofty Ranges and is home to rare or vulnerable native plants and animals, and problematic invasive species. It is managed by the City of Tea Tree Gully, the Department of Environment, Water and Natural Resources and a volunteer group—The Friends of Anstey Hill. The park is designed for recreational walking and has no visitor facilities. It is managed in association with the regional planning initiative known as of Yurrebilla, the Greater Mount Lofty Parklands.

The park's land was gradually acquired by the Government of South Australia beginning in 1966, based on recommendations in a 1962 report. From 1981 onwards, plans were published that aimed to develop the area for commercial purposes, but public pressure led to its declaration as a public reserve in 1989. The last land added was a small area in 2003. Anstey Hill, once known as Anstey's Hill, is a 371-metre-high (1,217 ft) peak in the park's south. Both hill and park are named after a road built by agricultural pioneer George Alexander Anstey. Fire authorities regard the park as an "arson hotspot", and it is frequently burned by bushfires—mostly deliberately lit. There is no permanent water except for springs in Water Gully, adjacent to ruins of a nursery, although there are many seasonal creeks. Much of the land is steep, rising 200 m (660 ft) across the park's breadth, with gradients often steeper than one in three. Erosion and land movements due to a significant geologic fault zone created this land form. The Gun Emplacement, a listed Geologic Monument and remnant of an ancient land surface, lies in the southwestern corner.

The Mannum–Adelaide pipeline crosses the park and the Anstey Hill water filtration plant lies on its southern boundary; together they supply 20% of Adelaide's reticulated water. Significant historical uses of the area are preserved as ruins and highlighted with interpretive signs. The ruins of Newman's Nursery are all that remains of what was once the largest plant nursery in the Southern Hemisphere. Ellis Cottage is one of the earliest homes in the area, and the Rumps Bakery building housed the first bakery in Tea Tree Gully. Quarries supplied stone for significant Victorian buildings in Adelaide and aggregate for road building. Klopper's quarries in the southwest hosted plays for the Festival of the Arts in 1980 and 1988.

== Today's park ==
Anstey Hill Recreation Park as of 2008

Anstey Hill Recreation Park is a reserved area of public land with short seasonal creeks, low hills and steep-sided gullies. Its boundaries are largely formed by Lower North East, North East, Perseverance and Range Roads; there is a small section south of Lower North East Road. It lies at the edge of the Mount Lofty Ranges' foothills and forms part of the "hill's face" that is visible from Adelaide's metropolitan area. The park covers 362 hectares (890 acres) of the City of Tea Tree Gully, approximately 19 km (12 mi) northeast of Adelaide's central business district, with parts in the suburbs of Tea Tree Gully, Vista, Highbury and Houghton. The Adelaide–Mannum water supply pipeline crosses the park's south, and an associated filtration plant is sited on its southern boundary. Adjacent to the water filtration plant is Anstey Hill, reaching 371.1 m (1,218 ft) above mean sea level. The hill is 50 m (160 ft) shorter than a nearby unnamed peak. The park's southern boundary abuts the Anstey Hill Quarry, a producer of white clay, and two large disused quarries.

Management of the park is influenced by the Department of Environment, Water and Natural Resources's long term biodiversity goals for the hill face zone and is also being managed in the broader context of a planning initiative known as Yurrebilla – The Greater Mount Lofty Parklands. The Department manages the park in association with local council and a volunteer group—The Friends of Anstey Hill. This volunteer group makes significant contributions to revegetation, weed control, ruin stabilisation and creation of walking trails. There are no visitor facilities or amenities except for walking trails, most of which follow fire access tracks; a single constructed pedestrian trail leads to Klopper's Quarry. The park is mostly designated as a "conservation zone" where only passive recreation, including walking dogs on leads, is permitted. Horses and motor vehicles are not allowed and only the main tracks are maintained.

In recognition of the established and popular activity of mountain biking in the greater Adelaide area, and to better accommodate the mountain biking community in the north eastern suburbs, it was proposed in 2006 to permit cycling in designated zones on purpose-built tracks and on certain management tracks within the park. The intention is to satisfy both biodiversity and recreation objectives in the park and reducing the incidence of illegal mountain bike riding in other non-designated areas.

Anstey Hill Park lies between Bureau of Meteorology measured rainfall contour lines that denote an annual average from 580 to 820 mm (23 to 32 in). It has hot dry summers, as does all of Adelaide, and December to February's average maximum daily temperatures 28 °C (82 °F) to 29 °C (84 °F). Temperatures drop significantly in the wetter winters; July's average maximum temperature is 14.6 °C (58.3 °F). Apart from springs in Water Gully, the site of Newman's Nursery ruins, all of the numerous creeks in the park are seasonal and dry for much of the year. The park rises from approximately 220 m (720 ft) above mean sea level on its western side to 420 m (1,380 ft) at the highest point in the park's southeast corner. Most of the park is steeply sloping with gradients steeper than one in four. Except for the base of Water Gully, topsoil throughout the park is shallow and low in plant nutrients.

There are frequent serious bushfires in the park. Much of the reserve was burned in 1980, eastern parts burned in 1981, and most of the park burned again in the 1983 Ash Wednesday fires; Newman's Nursery's remains were devastated during the 1983 bushfire. As recently as 2004, a major fire burned over 100 ha (247 acres) of bushland next to Anstey Hill. Most fires in the park are deliberately lit and the park is regarded as a "hotspot" for arson. Arson in the park is not a recent phenomenon; an early record comes from an 1869 coronial inquiry. The park has more than one arson attack, on average, each year. In the hill's face, encompassing Anstey Hill, approximately 60% of all fires (1999–2004) are deliberately lit and less than 5% are classed as naturally occurring. Most deliberately lit fires begin at the park's boundaries and are contained within it.

=== Geology ===
Elevation rise across the park results from land uplift along the Burnside-Eden fault zone. This zone is a major land fault separating the Adelaide Plains from the Mount Lofty Ranges and runs north-north-east across the park from its southwest corner. The park is underlain by neoproterozoic sedimentary rocks of the Burra Group overlying a Precambrian crystalline basement. Sediments were formed approximately 700 million years ago (mya) from sand washed into a shallow sea. Sand layers were then folded and slightly metamorphosed during the delamerian orogeny, a period of mountain building caused by tectonic plate movements and resulting east–west compression of Australia. This pushed up a mountain range, on the site of the present Mount Lofty Ranges, approximately 450 mya. The range was eroded to a level plain over the following 350 million years. Approximately 40 mya, the location of today's ranges and plains were flat, with a hard sedimentary capping. About 2 mya, block faulting raised the Mount Lofty Ranges, and much of the former land surface west of the ranges eroded away. The Gun Emplacement is a small remnant of this pre-erosion surface. It is a raised semi-circular flat area and has views over much of Adelaide from the southwestern corner of the park. The Emplacement is seen as an important regolith deposit, particularly for its role in understanding Adelaide's landscape's evolution. The Emplacement was declared a Geological Monument in 1978 for this geologic importance as well as its aesthetic and recreational value.

Across the park, different ages of exposed rocks are seen. Stoneyfell quartzite, composed mostly of quartzite with sandstone and some siltstone, is the youngest. Woolshed flat shale is older and is composed of siltstone, dolomite and some sandstone. The oldest regular exposure is Montacute dolomite, which is a blue-grey dolomite with magnesite, siltstone and sandstone. Quarries in the south of the park have been mined for Stoneyfell Quartzite. This type of quartzite is a clean, white, feldspathic quartzite with interbedded thin siltstone layers up to 30 cm (12 in) thick occurring at gaps of 1–2 metres (3 ft 3 in – 6 ft 7 in). Ripple marks in this rock clearly indicate its shallow water origin. Next to Newman's Nursery is a quarry with grey to blue silicaceous dolomite used for road material. It contains traces of pyrite and is overlain by phyllite. Tea Tree Gully freestone, as found in the largest quarry in the park, is a feldspathic sandstone bedded with quartzite. Decay of the feldspar has enabled it to be cut and dressed as a quality building stone. The Tea Tree Gully iron (or silver) mine lies in an iron-rich fault zone. The ore body is ironstone, 150 m long, 50 m wide and 30 m thick (490 ft by 160 ft by 100 ft). It is primarily limonite, detrital quartz and silica. It is thought to have been chemically deposited during the Paleogene and Neogene periods, 2 mya to 66 mya.

=== Flora and fauna ===
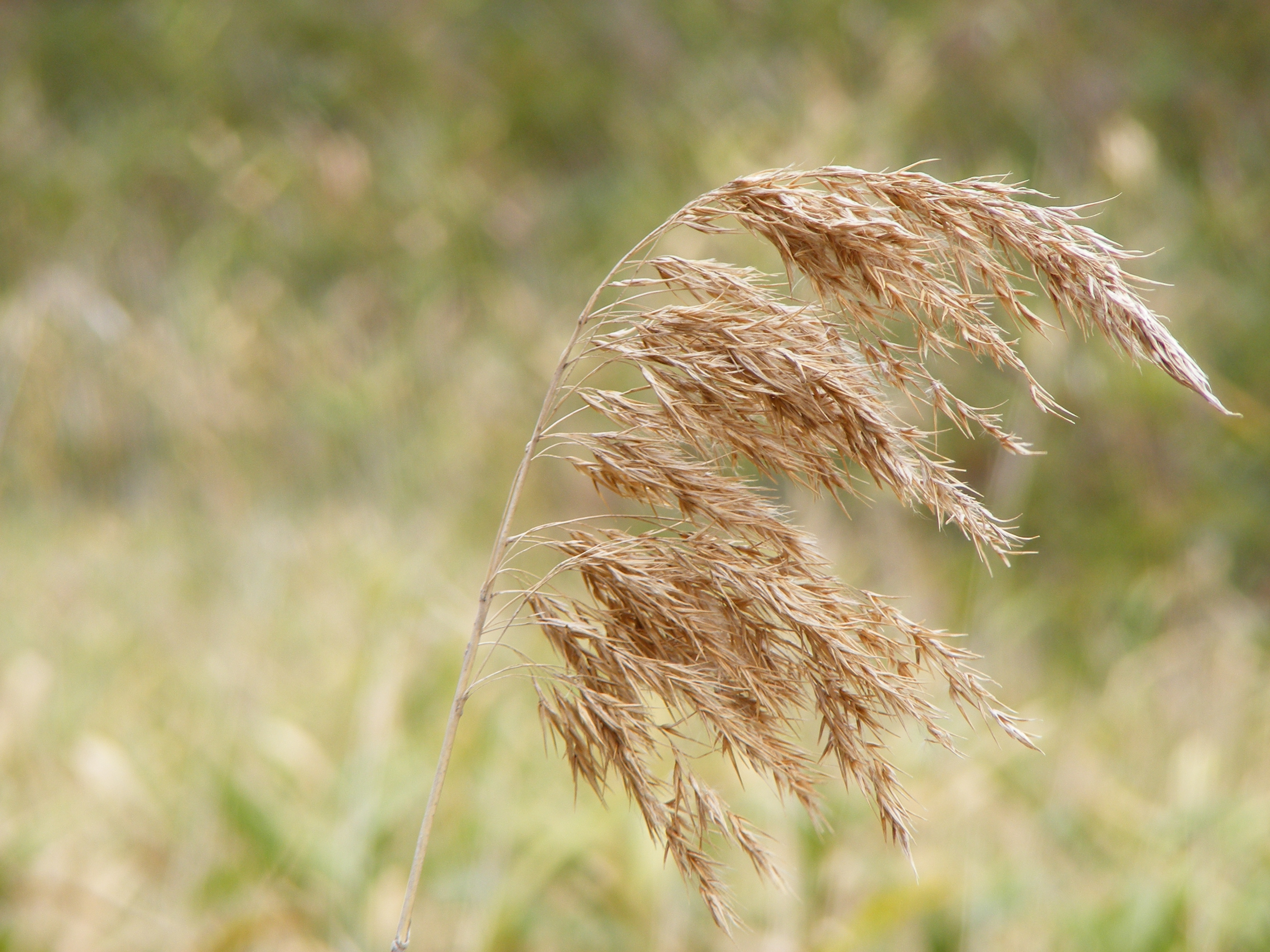
Native Austrostipa nodosa (spear grass) dried at the start of summer

In the 1983 concept plan, 413 plant species were identified, including 124 that were not native to the park. The park was noted as one of the few remaining significant areas of bushland in the foothills. By 2006, the flora list contained 411 species, with 107 of these non-native. Five of the native species were then noted as rare or vulnerable, including Prasophyllum pallidum (pale leek-orchid). The park has significant stands of pink gums (Eucalyptus fasciculosa) and long-leafed box (Eucalyptus goniocalyx). button daisy, pussy tail (Ptilotus macrocephalus), needlebush (Hakea sericea), silky guinea flower (Hibbertia sericea) and black rapier sedge (Lepidosperma carphoides) are common. black-boys (Xanthorrhoea), hop bush (Dodonaea viscosa ssp. spatulata) and tea-tree form the understory in parts of the park. The area around the ruins of Newman's Nursery is noted for its spring orchid display. Quarry floors have large plants typical of much of the Mount Lofty Ranges. Golden wattle (Acacia pycnantha) and drooping sheoak (Allocasuarina verticillata), as well as red gums (Eucalyptus camaldulensis), native pine (Callitris preissii) and blue gum (Eucalyptus leucoxylon) are common.

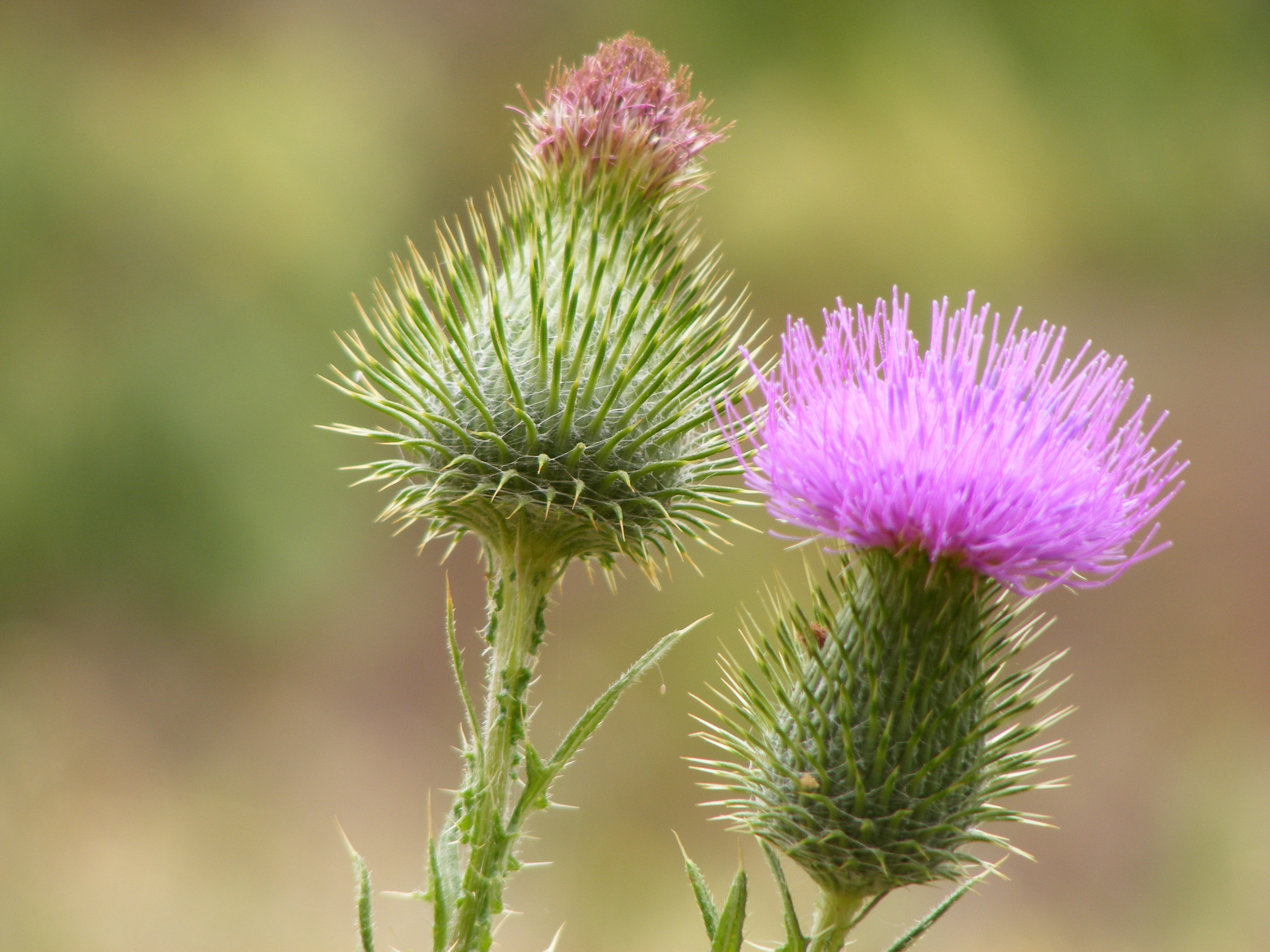
Invasive Cirsium vulgare (spear thistle) in Water Gully

Invasive weeds are prevalent in, and damaging to, the park. Species common in other formerly occupied parts of the foothills are also common in the park. Of significant concern, largely for their impact on native flora, are bridal creeper (Asparagus asparagoides), boneseed (Chrysanthemoides monilifera), artichoke thistle (Cynara cardunculus), varieties of broom, Spanish heath (Erica lusitanica), fennel (Foeniculum vulgare), olives, blackberries, common gorse (Ulex europaeus) and dog rose (Rosa canina). In July 2001, Phytophthora cinnamomi, a significant cause of plant disease in the Adelaide Hills, was found in the park. Mechanical countermeasures, in the form of boot scrubbing stations, have been introduced to control its spread.

The concept plan identified 145 species of birds as either known or expected to be found in the park. By 2006, 98 species had been recorded in the park's area, though not all specifically within the park's boundaries. Of the park's insects, seven species were found to be largely confined by its boundaries, with little presence in the rest of Adelaide. Their presence was unusual, as they were regarded as arid zone species. Approximately 35 reptile and amphibian species have been recorded within Anstey Hill park. Fauna in the park includes western grey kangaroo, common ringtail possum, common brushtail possum, short-beaked echidna, Gould's wattled bat, chocolate wattled bat, little forest bat, white-striped free-tailed bat and the lesser long-eared bat. Koalas are present, though they are not native to the area, having been deliberately introduced to the Adelaide hills.

Foreign animals are also found, in common with much of Adelaide. While red foxes, cats, European rabbits, black rats, house mice and European hares are seen, there has been no systemic recording of alien fauna species. Exotic birds, including rock pigeons, European goldfinch, house sparrow, starlings and blackbirds are common. Introduced bees and European wasps are present, with the aggressive wasps an issue for the park's visitors.

=== Naming ===
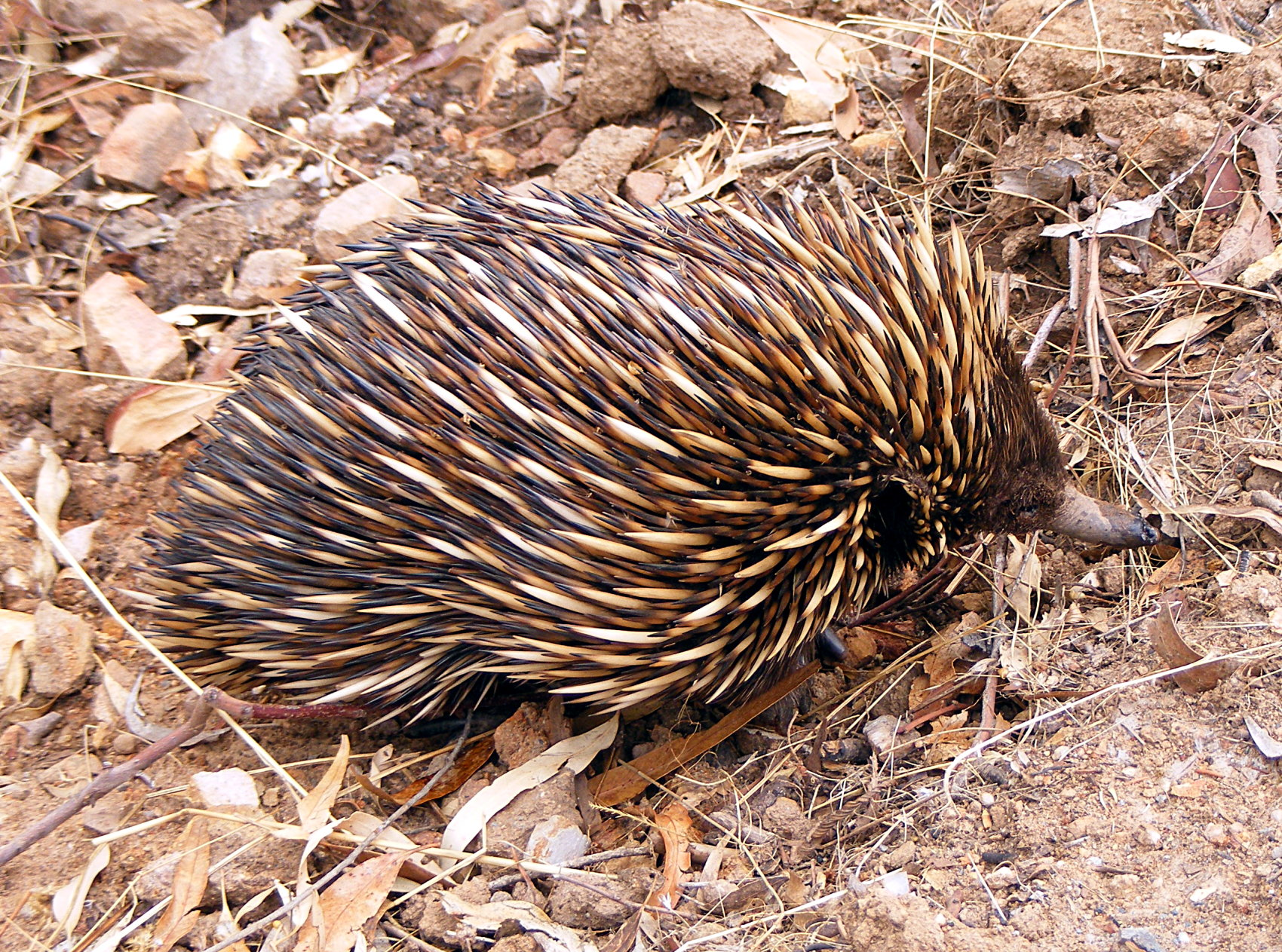
A short-beaked echidna (Tachyglossus aculeatus) foraging

The name of the park derives from a road built by George Alexander Anstey, a South Australian pastoral and horticultural pioneer. Anstey established Highercombe Estate on two land sections east of the park that he purchased in 1840. He built a private road to his estate, which ran along the base of a gully and up a steep hillside. The road was initially named "Anstey Hill Road"; this name was later used for the hill, the subsequent land reserve and the current recreation park. The Gun Emplacement was officially named as such in 1997 after a period of unofficial usage. This name was first used by Major William Hubert Edmunds, a Lieutenant cartographer in the Boer War who later enlisted in the Commonwealth of Australia forces. After leaving the military, Edmunds carried out "reconnaissance surveys" on the fringes of the Adelaide metropolitan area. As part of the work, he took particular note of an unusual plateau at the edge of what is now Tea Tree Gully. By the time his work was published in 1926, he had named the plateau "The Gun Emplacement", presumably for its suitability as a location for a field gun battery.

== Foundation ==
In 1962, the South Australian Planning Authority's town planning committee released a report on the development of metropolitan Adelaide. The report, in part, recommended that a regional park be established north of Anstey Hill and southeast of Tea Tree Gully. The stated intention was preservation of the character of the face of the foothills, as visible from Adelaide's suburbs. From 1966 to 1977, land was purchased under the auspices of the State Planning Authority, for what was then "reserve 13".

One notable purchase was of 73 hectares (180 acres) in 1969, of which 16 hectares (40 acres) was an active quarry operated by Quarry Industries. This quarry was known as the Tea Tree Gully freestone quarry and today lies in the park's northwest. It had a permit to operate until December 1970, which was later extended to December 1980. Additional land affected by the quarrying was purchased in 1971. By the end of the lease, rehabilitation work completed did not meet the standard required by the Planning Authority. Quarry Industries vacated the site in April 1982, other firms then contracted to continue rehabilitation work. Land beneath the Gun Emplacement was subdivided for housing in 1966. A developer unsuccessfully attempted to have the plateau subdivided in 1975. The site was purchased by the government in 1978 and added to the then Anstey Hill Reserve. During the 1970s, part of the park's area was earmarked to be subdivided and developed for housing. Significant opposition to this use, due to the land's historical and scientific significance, came from the South Australian division of the Geological Society of Australia, the National Trust of South Australia and the Field Naturalists Society of South Australia.

The Planning Authority established the Anstey Hill Joint Steering Committee in 1981, initially to prepare a concept plan for development of the reserve. The draft report was published in late 1981 with a proposal to spend up to $3.5 million establishing the park. Uses were explored including: a rock climbing area, motocross circuit, kiosk, cycle track, horse riding area, caravan and camping grounds and a restaurant. In 1983, the then state Department of Environment and Planning published the final concept plan for the "Anstey Hill Regional Park". The plan indicated that a caravan park, or possibly a velodrome, might be an appropriate development. There was significant interest by developers to use parts of the park commercially. Increasing public opposition to this concept led to the declaration of the entire reserve as a public recreation park. The Friends of Anstey Hill Recreation Park volunteer group was formed in 1990. Most of the then 306.5 ha (757-acre) park was proclaimed on 31 August 1989 with a smaller 55.5-hectare (137-acre) addition in October 2001. It was officially opened by Environment and Planning Minister Susan Lenehan in a ceremony on 17 September 1989. The Department for Environment and Heritage added one last section to the park in 2003. A wedge of land 15 by 260 m (49 by 853 ft) remained from a purchase by George Dickerson in 1857. This land formed part of a cliff and had long been managed as part of the park. No known current owner was found and the Department compulsorily acquired the land and added it to the Recreation Park.

== Land use ==
Although it lies within the traditional lands of the Aboriginal Kaurna people, no occupation sites have been found. Much of the park has been used for agriculture since European settlement. Significant European uses of the park's land have been Newman's Nursery, a main road, mines, quarries and a water filtration plant.

=== Newman's Nursery ===
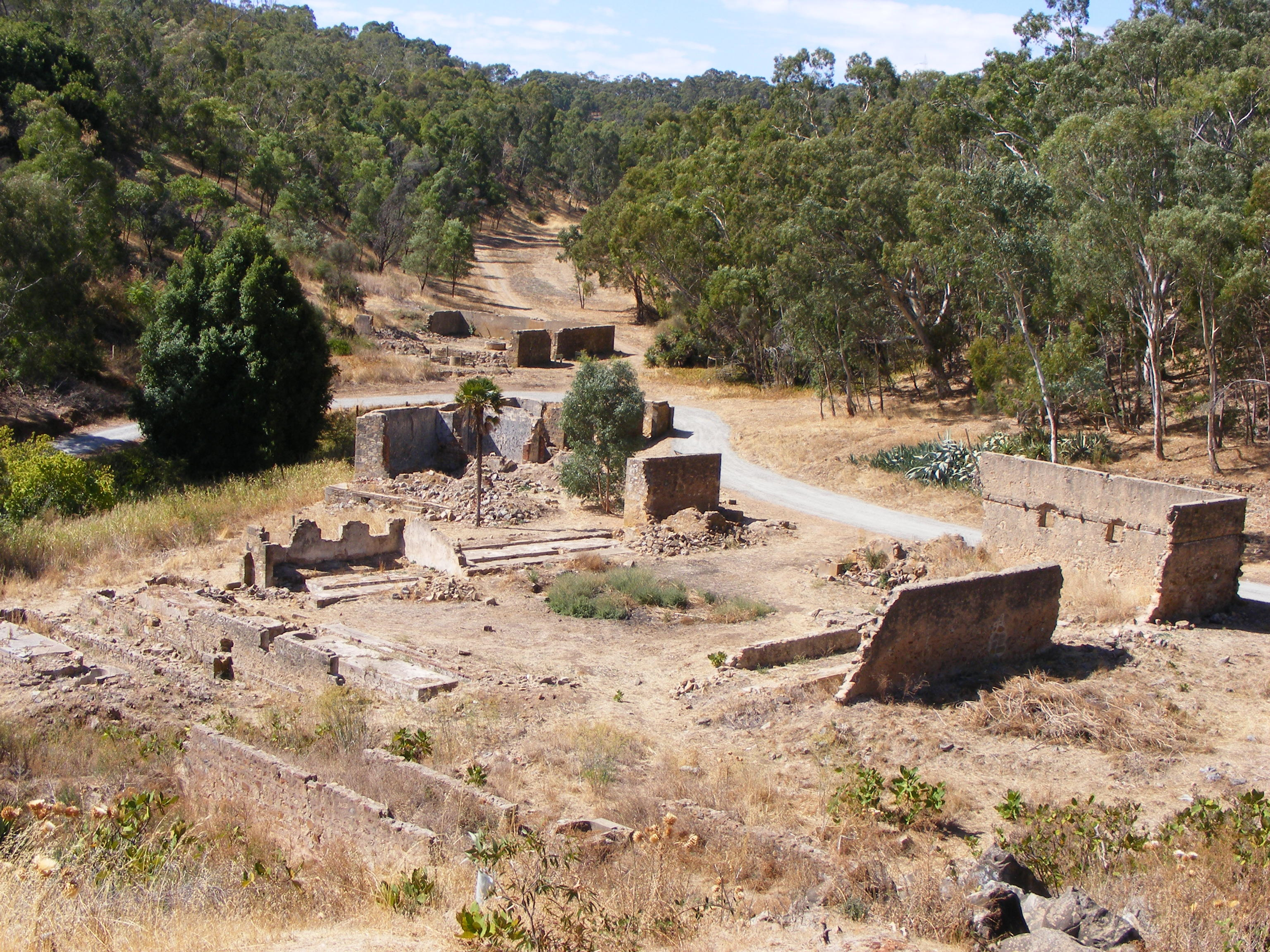
Ruins of Newman's Nursery, 2008

The remains of Newman's Nursery, established by Charles Newman and his family in the second half of the 19th century, are situated within the park at the base of Water Gully. After living on a rural property near Houghton, he bought 68 acres (28 ha) of unfenced land in 1854. This land encompassed what became known as Water Gully, a gully with a creek and permanent springs. The first house, a simple slab hut set into a hill bank, was built on the property by 1855. The Newmans added more land from 1866; at its largest the property covered 469 acres (190 ha) and had a land tax valuation of GBP£7850 (A$ 1.64 million in 2005) by 1885. From 1854 onwards, the initially heavily wooded land was continuously cleared, planted and developed.

The Newmans developed a nursery on the site between 1857 and 1871, over time assisted by their 17 children. There were hothouses in operation by 1870, and produce from the site was shown in exhibits from 1871. At maximum extent in the late 19th century it had its own dairy and large numbers of glasshouses and hothouses. At the time it was the largest nursery in the Southern Hemisphere. Newman renamed it in 1875 to 'Newman's Model Nursery', probably for promotional purposes. In 1889 plant stocks included over 100,000 orange trees, the same number of mostly muscatel grape vines and 500,000 other fruit trees. It grew 300 varieties of orchids, 350 of chrysanthemums and 700 of roses. The nursery was a frequent prize winner at agricultural fairs and exhibitions. At the Great Exhibition for the Queen's Jubilee in 1887, the Newmans won two "First Orders of Merit", the exhibition's highest award, and all three "Exhibition Diplomas" on offer. Charles Newman died in 1889 after falling from his horse, and control of the nursery passed to his sixth son, Frederick.

During a severe storm in February 1913, 2 inches (51 mm) of rain fell in an hour, setting the streams, creeks and roads awash and damaging the nursery. In October of the same year, another storm destroyed buildings and plantings. Due to the extent of the destruction, and the lack of funds for full repairs, the nursery never fully recovered. Frederick Newman left the nursery in 1925 to run a smaller one in Tea Tree Gully, next to North East Road; control of the original nursery passed to Harry Newman. With the death of Charles' wife Mary Ann in 1932, the property was sold and subsequently used as a dairy. It changed ownership again in 1935, then used for sheep grazing. The new owner removed everything of value from the property; slate paving and benches were sold, buildings were stripped to walls and foundations, pine trees lining the entrance road were turned to box wood and some outbuildings were knocked down. Most remaining plants and fruit trees from the property's nursery days were destroyed by bushfires during Ash Wednesday in 1983. The ruins of Newman's Nursery consist largely of foundations and walls and are listed on the State Heritage Register.

=== Mining and quarrying ===
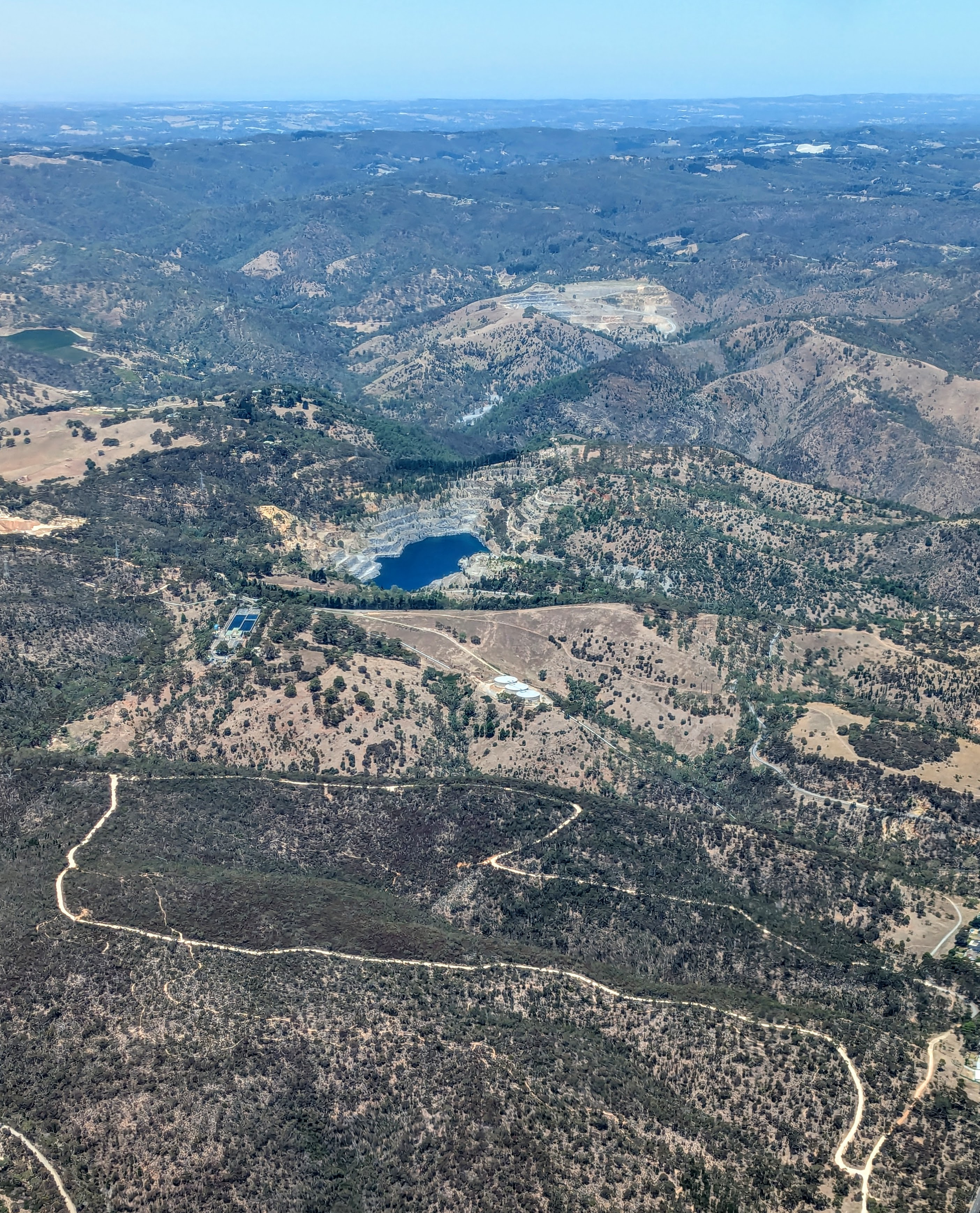
Aerial view of Anstey Hill Recreation Park looking south, with water treatment plant and quarries behind it

Dolomite, sandstone and quartzite rock have been extensively mined in the park. Though traces of silver, copper and gold are present, there have been no economic finds. The park is scattered with many quarries; the largest within the park is an open-cut in the northwest corner. It was in operation until 1982 supplying stone for buildings, including Adelaide's war memorial and St Peter's Cathedral. Tea Tree Gully Freestone from some quarries has been used for the facades and ornamental dressing of many of Adelaide's Victorian public buildings. Adelaide Town Hall, the General Post Office and Supreme Court Buildings in Adelaide were all built entirely of this stone. The quarries supplied dressing stock for ornamentation on buildings, including St Peter's Cathedral, St Francis Xavier's Cathedral, Flinders Street Baptist Church and the University of Adelaide's Mitchell Building.

An ironstone mine was opened to work on a rock outcrop in 1853. The mine was to supply flux for the Port Adelaide copper smelting works, but it apparently closed within a year. It was reopened in 1861 and operated until 1862. The Tea Tree Gully Silver Mining Company began work in the area in 1888, constructing a tramway, blacksmith shop and a new road. With no economic finds, the company closed in July 1889. The quarry, in Water Gully adjacent to the nursery's ruins, has been mined for blue dolomite, some of which was used for the nursery's buildings. Quarries elsewhere in Water Gully were opened in the 1880s and intermittently supplied quartzite road metal for the District Council of Tea Tree Gully. A crushing plant was erected on the north side of the gully in 1912 to create this road material.

When the park was proclaimed, land zoning regulations allowed existing mining prospecting rights to continue. These rights were restricted to previously mined areas; this coupled with further restrictions imposed by the National Parks and Wildlife Service Act (1972) make it unlikely that mining will occur in the future.

=== Klopper's quarries ===
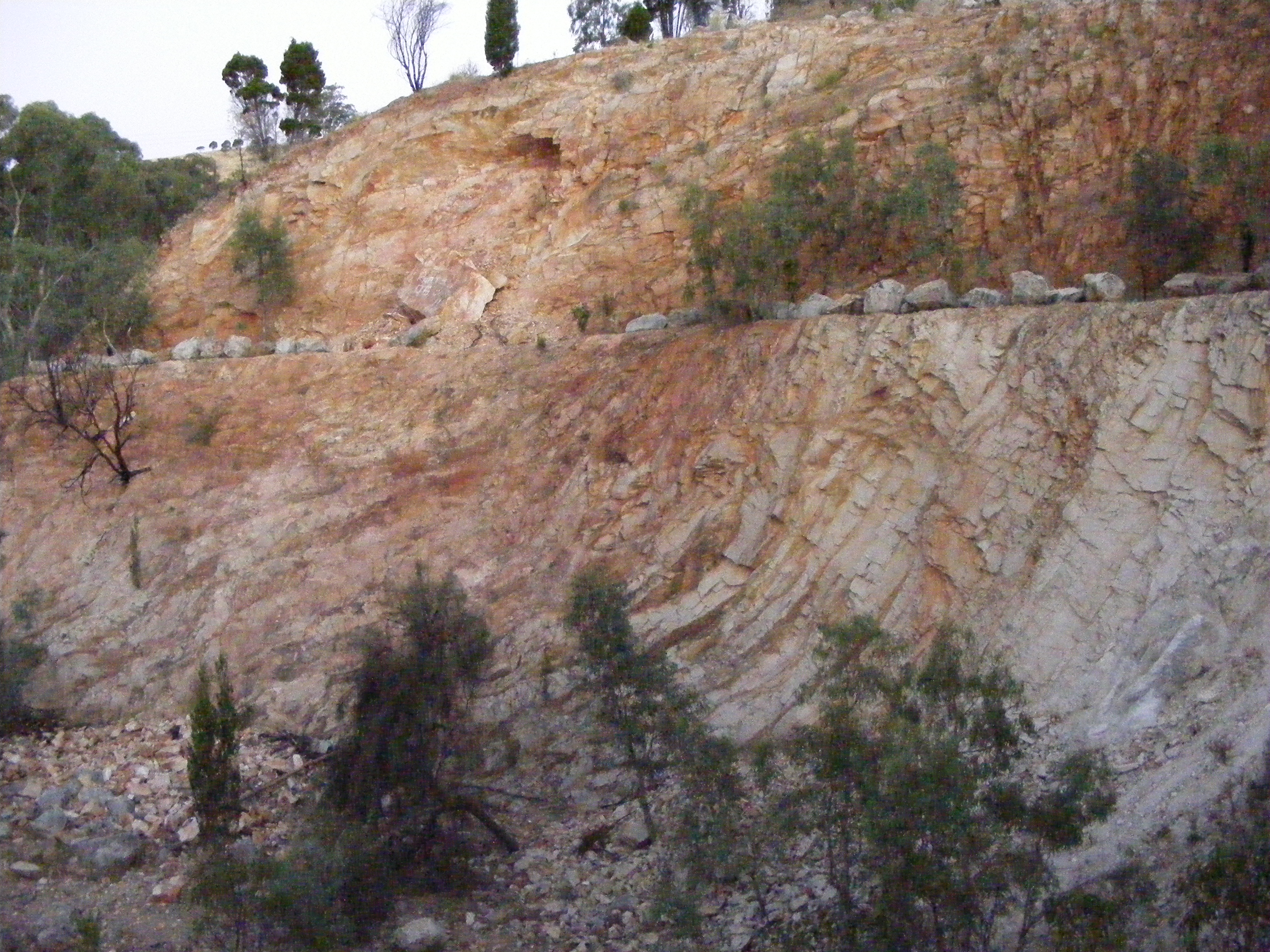
Klopper's freestone quarry, twice host to Adelaide's Festival of the Arts

Klopper's quarries, in the park's south, were mined in the late 19th and early 20th centuries. They were established by Heinrich Kloepper—later anglicised to Henry Klopper—who arrived at Adelaide in 1847 from Hamburg, Germany. He purchased land in Hope Valley and a section below Anstey Hill. On the Anstey Hill section he opened his first quarry in 1850. The Klopper quarries supplied aggregate for road building and bluestone for home and road kerbs. After Klopper's death in 1888 his wife and sons continued the quarries' operation. Stone from the first quarry was used to build a family home, on the south east corner of nearby Valley and Grand Junction roads. Additional quarries were opened and supplied metal for most of the roads constructed in Highercombe. In 1905 the family opened a freestone quarry within the park that operated until its 1927 sale.

The freestone quarry was used to host plays as part of the Adelaide Festival of Arts. It seated about 800 people and its 20 m (66 ft) face provided a backdrop to the performances. Three plays were performed over fifteen nights in the 1980 festival. A nine-hour production of the Mahābhārata, by the theatre company of Peter Brook, was performed in 1988.

=== Ellis Cottage and Rumps Bakery ===
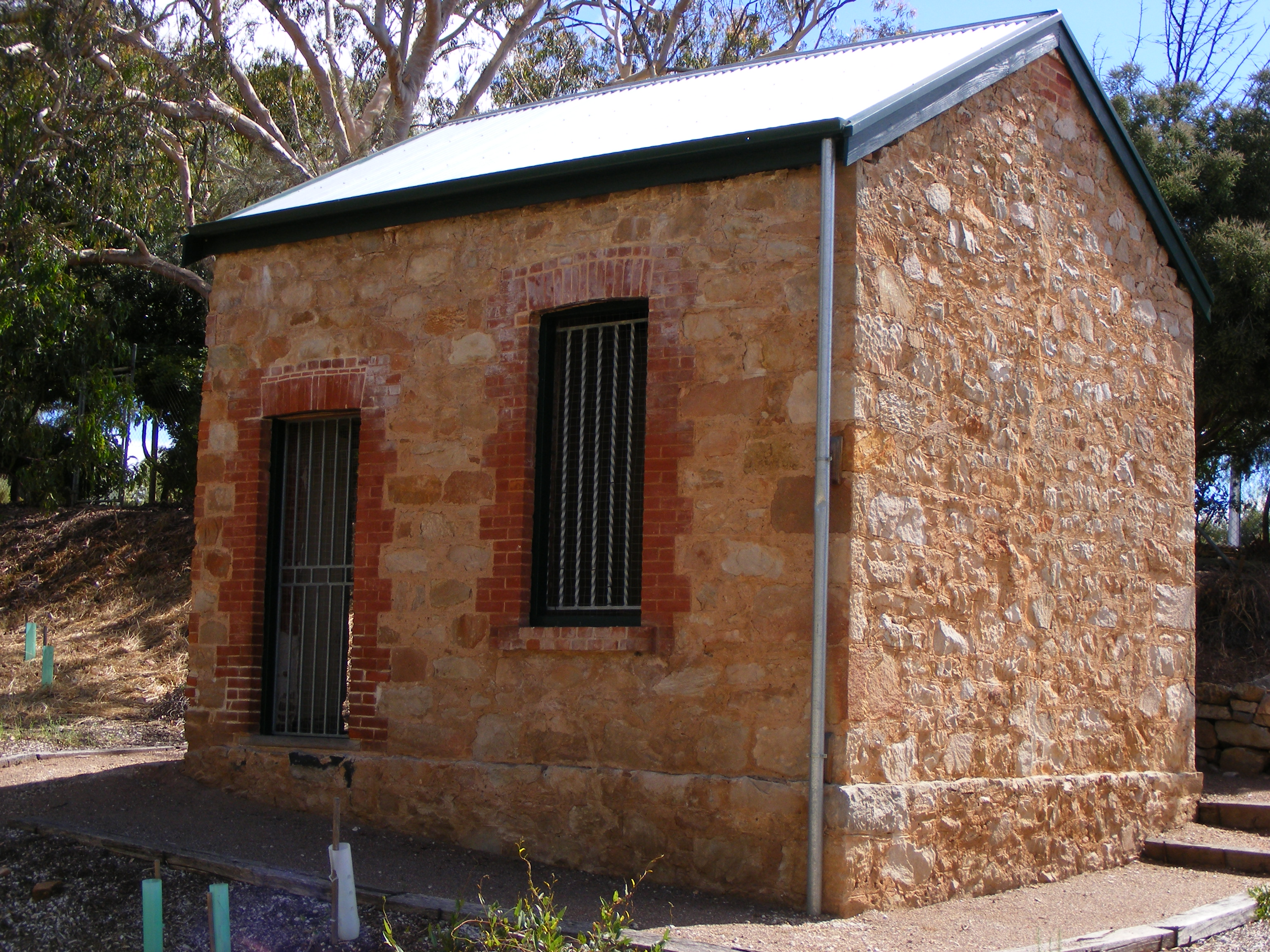
Ellis Cottage in 2008

The historic Ellis Cottage and Rumps Bakery buildings lie near the corner of Perseverance and North East roads. Built in 1854, Ellis Cottage is a single room stone building built by John Stevens, founder of Steventon Estate that later become the suburb of Tea Tree Gully. It was named after the Ellis family, who owned and used the building for storage for many years until World War II. Rumps Bakery was built in 1854 with local stone. From 1867 to 1893 it was rented to Charles Rumps, who started Tea Tree Gully's first bakery in the building in 1872. In 1894, the building was sold to Ernest Heitmann, who continued to use it as a bakery. Until the mid-20th century, the Ellis family and an adjacent general store frequently used it for storage. Assisted by a government grant and supervised by the Department of Environment and Heritage, the Friends of Anstey Hill stabilised both buildings in 2000.

=== Water filtration plant ===
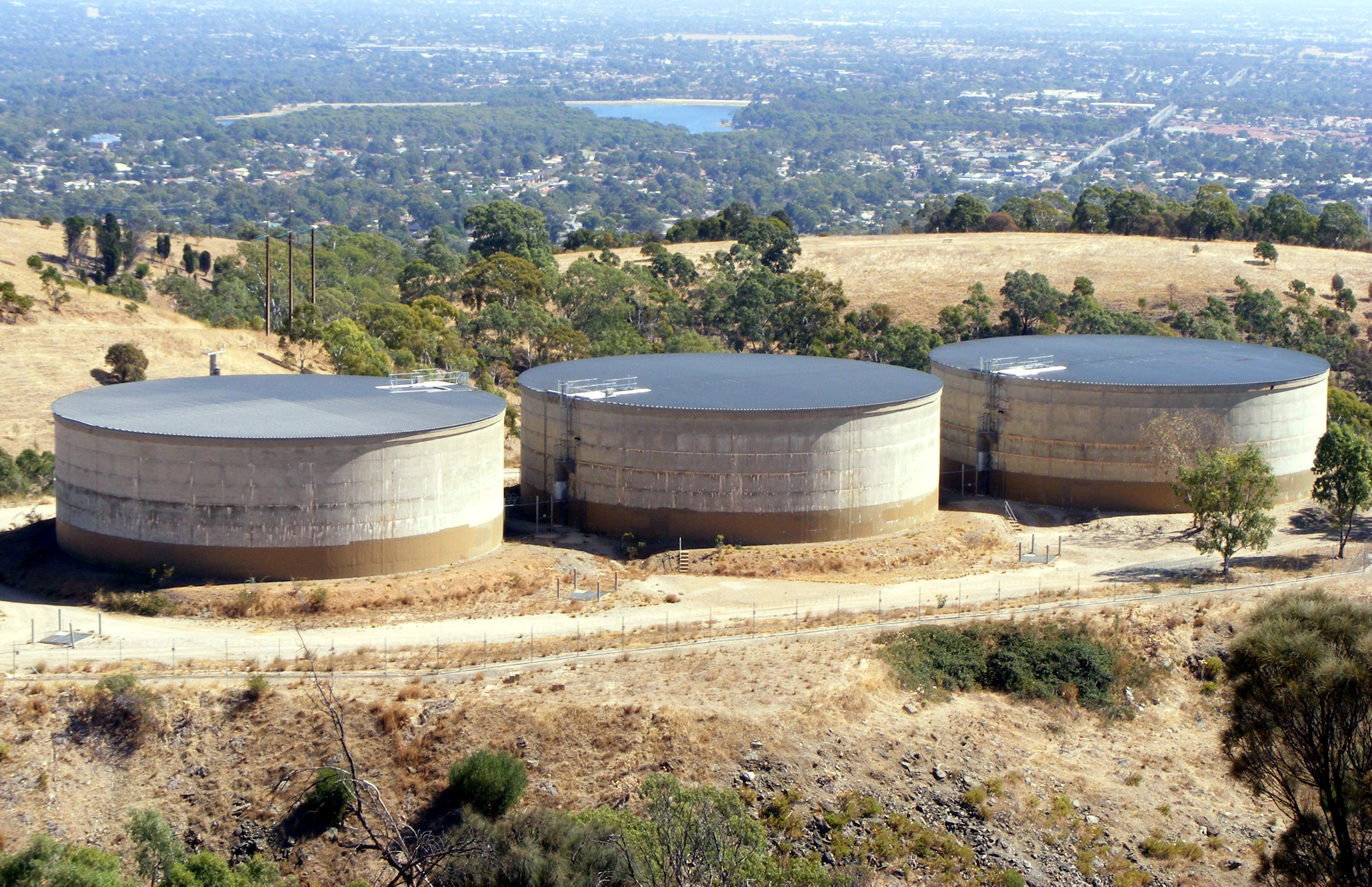
Water storage tanks associated with the filtration plant

In the 1970s, the Engineering and Water Supply Department chose an area at the top of the park, adjacent to Lower North East Road, to build a water treatment works. Based partly on seismic refraction traverses, a ridge underlain by dolomite and quartzite was deemed to be stable enough for construction. The site was also selected because of its hydraulic advantages; all other sites would have required the construction of a major pumping station. The exact placement of the site was made so that it could not be seen from the metropolitan area. It has a design flow of 313 megalitres (ML) per day with a maximum capacity of 344 ML. The plant was commissioned in 1980 and uses filtration and sedimentation techniques to clean water from the Mannum to Adelaide pipeline. It was the second plant in Adelaide, after the opening of the Hope Valley plant in 1977. Most of the water is piped directly from the River Murray, but some is sourced from Millbrook Reservoir.

The plant was intended to serve 70,000 homes in the outer northeastern suburbs of Adelaide, specifically those north of the River Torrens. The total construction cost was $14.5 million, including changes to the existing pipeline. As of 2005, the plant filters approximately 20% of Adelaide's water supply. A small hydroelectric plant began operating in adjacent Hope Valley in 2003, using the head of water as it flows down Anstey Hill. The plant is designed to supply 7,000 megawatt hours per year.

=== Roads ===
Lower North East Road runs around Anstey Hill and up the escarpment of the Burnside-Eden Fault Zone. It connects the suburbs—formerly villages—of Hope Valley and Houghton. Three roads were surveyed and built to connect the same locations. The first was a private road constructed by George Anstey in 1841—although officially surveyed in 1844—to reach his estate, as a mostly straight-line extension of Grand Junction Road. It followed the base of a gully, before rising steeply up Anstey Hill. From 1842 to 1846, Anstey constructed a replacement private road with a devil's elbow (double hairpin bend) that followed the land's contours more closely. As Chairman of Roads for the District of Yatala, Anstey allocated most of the district's funding to his road, leading to a public outcry that forced him from office in 1851. This ungravelled road became known as Anstey Hill Road and remained in use for 20 years. New Road, later renamed Houghton Road and subsequently Lower North East Road, was constructed in 1873 as a replacement. It was longer than the preceding roads but lacked a devil's elbow, was more evenly sloped, and was paved in 1930. It now separates a small part of the park—that contains Klopper's quarries and the Gun Emplacement—from the rest. Remains of the two previous roads can be seen near Klopper's quarries.

Perseverance Road, and some housing, defines the western edge of much of the park. William Haines was the district clerk for Tea Tree Gully from 1867 to 1902 and Member of Parliament for Gumeracha from 1878 to 1884. Since 1862, he had lobbied for construction of a road to link Tea Tree Gully to Anstey Hill Road. The 1–1/2 mile road was eventually approved and subsequently opened in 1880. Known as Haines' Folly before its completion, it was officially called Haines' Perseverance Road at the opening ceremony.

== Anstey Hill Quarry ==
The Anstey Hill Quarry is adjacent to the southern border of the park. In 2017, the then very neglected quarry was used for another Adelaide Festival production (as Klopper's quarry, which had been used in the 1988 festival, had been regenerated): The Secret River, written by Andrew Bovell and first staged in 2013. Before the production could be staged, the abandoned quarry had to be cleaned of a large amount of rubbish and weeds, and the dirt track sealed to carry the traffic. The show was a record-breaking success, selling out all performances over its 18 nights, with an audience of 800 each night. It was a co-production of the State Theatre Company of South Australia and the Sydney Theatre Company, co-directed by Neil Armfield and Geordie Brookman.

== See also ==
- List of protected areas in Adelaide
