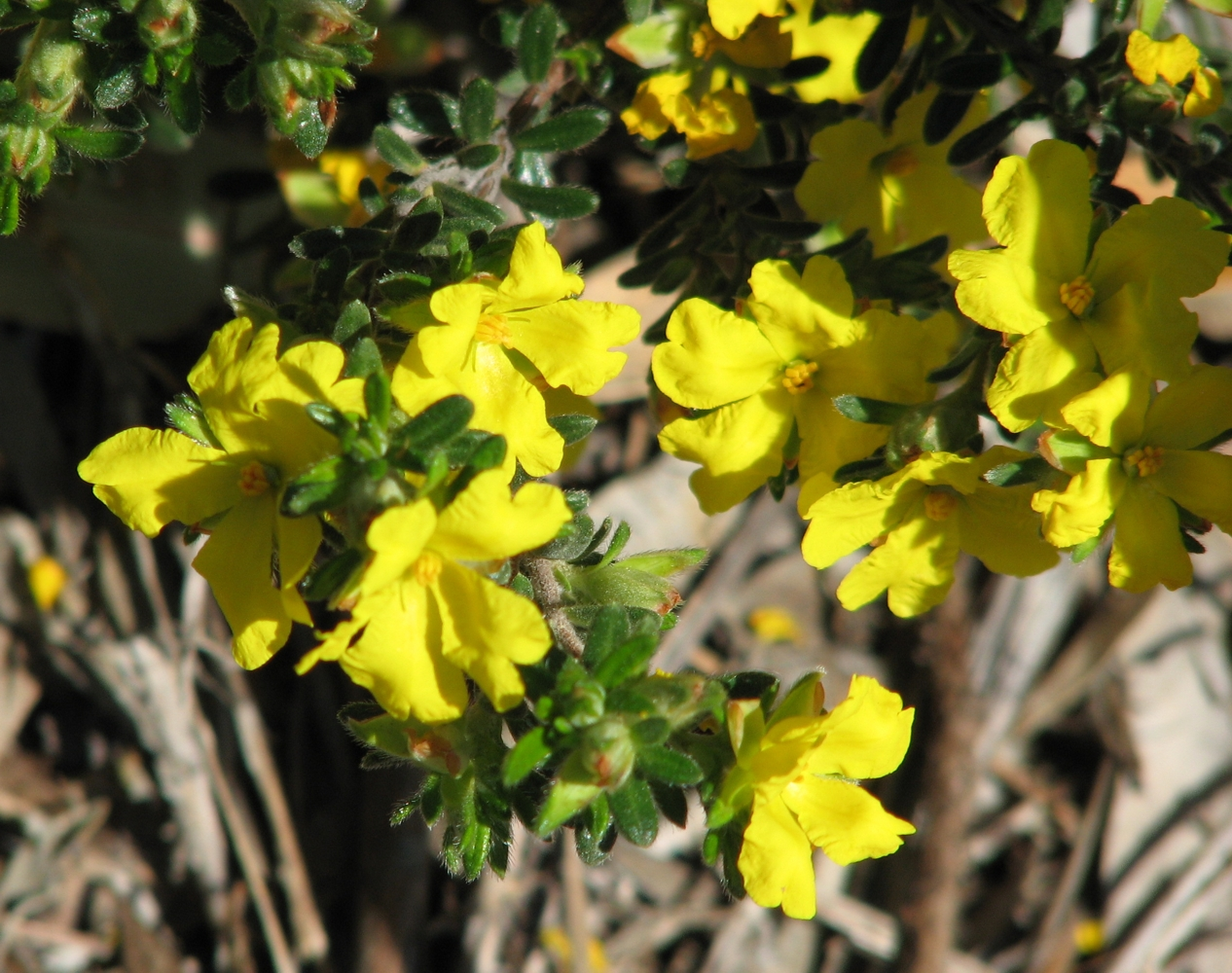
- In Geelong Botanic Gardens

Scientific classification
- Kingdom: Plantae
- Clade: Tracheophytes
- Clade: Angiosperms
- Clade: Eudicots
- Order: Dilleniales
- Family: Dilleniaceae
- Genus: Hibbertia
- Species: H. sericea

Binomial name
- Hibbertia sericea (R.Br. ex DC.) Benth.

Synonyms
- Hibbertia sericea var. scabrifolia J.M.Black p.p.; Pleurandra sericea R.Br. ex DC.

= Hibbertia sericea =

Silky guinea-flower

Species of plant

Hibbertia sericea, commonly known as silky guinea-flower, is a species of flowering plant in the family Dilleniaceae and is endemic to south-eastern Australia. It is an erect or spreading shrub with softly-hairy branches, elliptic to egg-shaped leaves with the narrower end towards the base, and yellow flowers with eight to fourteen stamens in a cluster on one side of two hairy carpels.

== Description ==
Hibbertia sericea is a erect or spreading shrub that typically grows to a height of 30–70 cm (12–28 in) with softly-hairy young branches. The leaves are elliptic to egg-shaped with the narrower end towards the base, 1.8–22 mm (0.071–0.866 in) long, 0.9–5.1 mm (0.035–0.201 in) wide and woolly-hairy on the lower surface. The flowers are 12–30 mm (0.47–1.18 in) wide and arranged on the ends of branchlets either singly or in clusters of up to seven. The flowers are sessile with leaf-like bracts 3.5–10.6 mm (0.14–0.42 in) long, all surrounded by bract-like leaves. The sepals are hairy, 5.1–7.7 mm (0.20–0.30 in) long, the outer sepals usually slightly longer but narrower than the inner ones. The petals are bright yellow, egg-shaped with the narrower end towards the base, 5.5–11.3 mm (0.22–0.44 in) long with eight to fourteen stamens in a single cluster on one side of the two hairy carpels, each carpel with four to eight ovules. Flowering occurs from August to November.

This species is highly variable and some forms are difficult to distinguish from H. crinita. Three forms, sericea, densiflora and scabridifolia, all occurring in Victoria, have been described.

== Taxonomy ==
Hibbertia sericea was first formally described in 1817 by Augustin Pyramus de Candolle who gave it the name Pleurandra sericea in his Regni Vegetabilis Systema Naturale from an unpublished description by Robert Brown. It was subsequently given the name Hibbertia sericea by George Bentham in 1863.

== Distribution and habitat ==
Silky guinea-flower grows in woodland, mallee and coastal heath in south-eastern South Australia, northern Tasmania and scattered populations in Victoria and Queensland.
