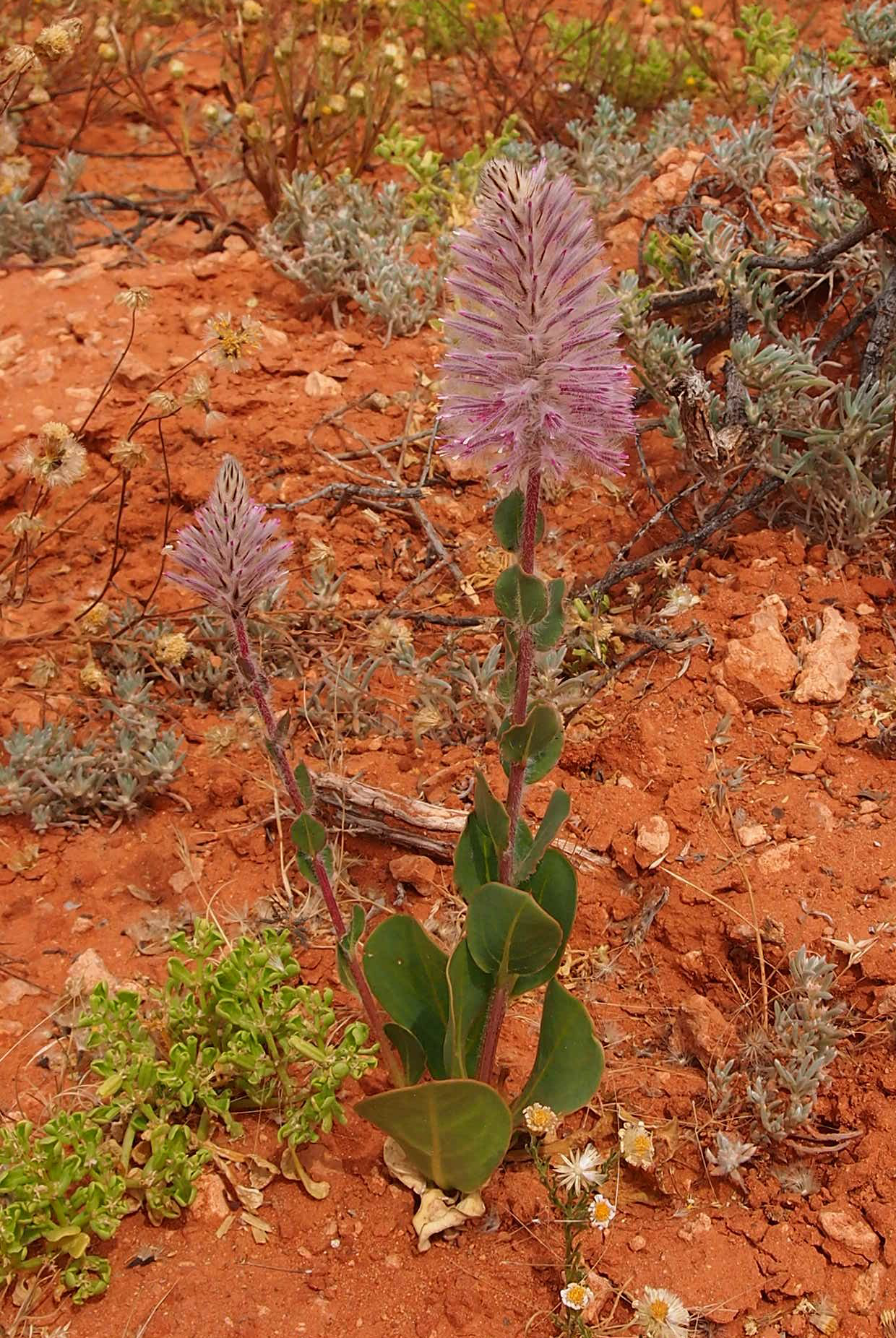

Scientific classification
- Kingdom: Plantae
- Clade: Tracheophytes
- Clade: Angiosperms
- Clade: Eudicots
- Order: Caryophyllales
- Family: Amaranthaceae
- Genus: Ptilotus
- Species: P. exaltatus

Binomial name
- Ptilotus exaltatus Nees

Synonyms
- Ptilotus exaltatus Nees var. exaltatus; Ptilotus exaltatus var. glaber Benl; Ptilotus exaltatus var. pallidus Benl; Ptilotus exaltatus var. villosus Benl; Ptilotus sp. Goldfields (R.Davis 10796) WA Herbarium; Trichinium burtonii F.M.Bailey; Trichinium exaltatum (Nees) Benth.; Trichinium nervosum F.M.Bailey; Ptilotus nobilis subsp. nobilis auct. non : State Herbarium of South Australia (2011), Census of South Australian Plants; Ptilotus nobilis subsp. nobilis auct. non : Bean, A.R. (11 November 2008)

= Ptilotus exaltatus =

Species of plant

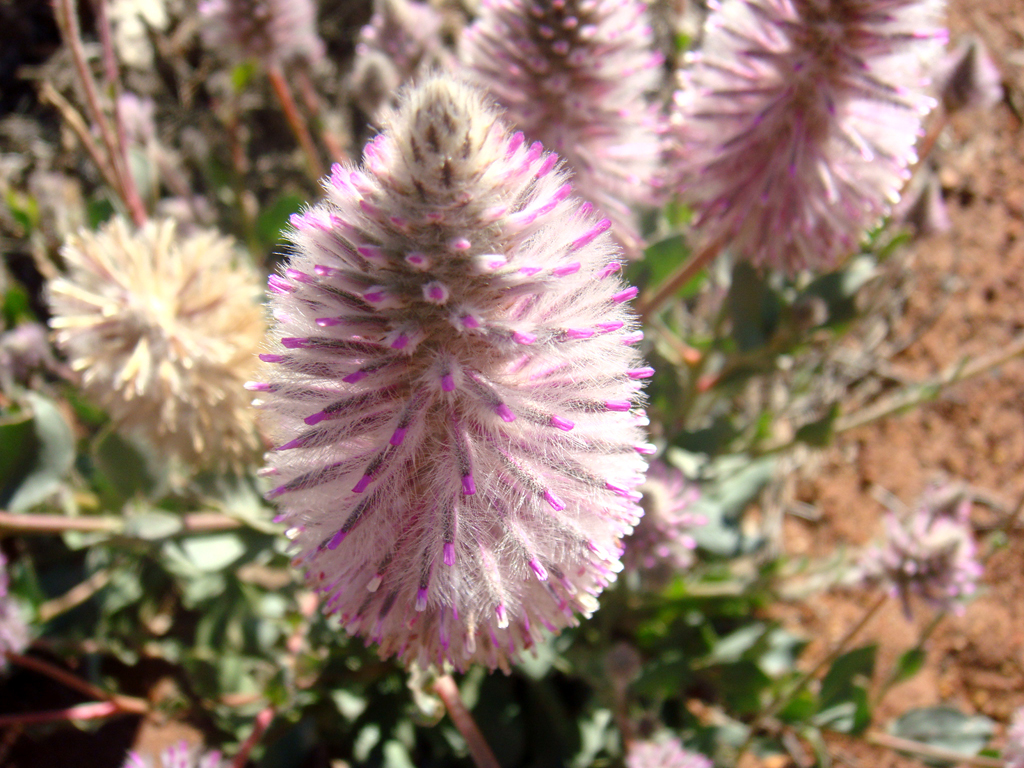
Close up of spike

Close up image of a flower

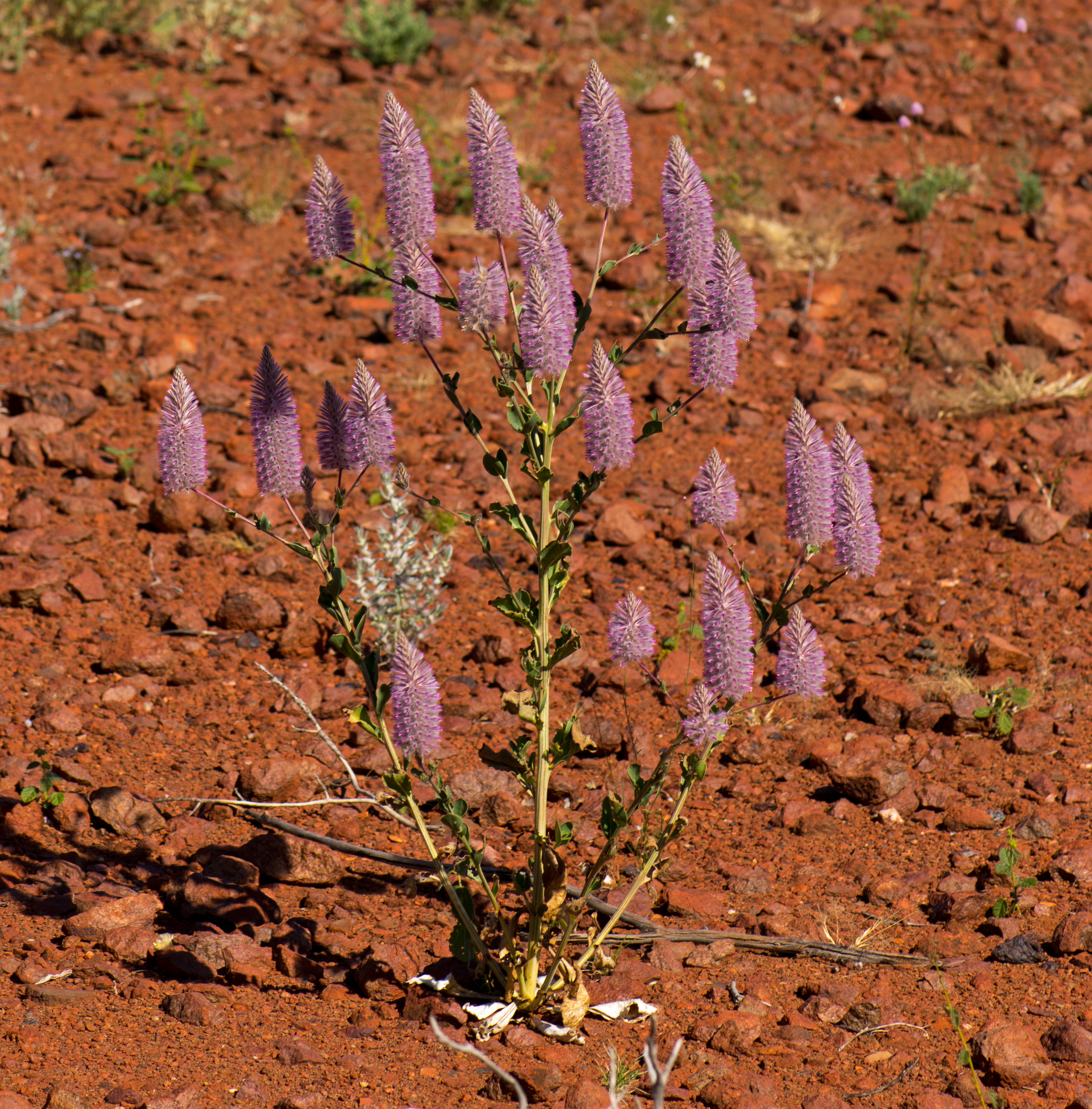
Habit in the Pilbara region of Western Australia

Ptilotus exaltatus, commonly known as tall mulla mulla, large pink pussy-tails, pink mulla mulla , lambs tail, or showy foxtail, is a species of flowering plant in the family Amaranthaceae and is endemic to large parts of arid and semi-arid Australia. It is an erect annual or short-lived perennial herb with lance-shaped or spatula-shaped leaves, and cylindrical spikes of pink to purple flowers.

== Description ==
Ptilotus exaltatus is an annual or short-lived perennial herb that typically grows to a height of up to about 1 m (3 ft 3 in) with a fleshy taproot. Its stems are covered with shaggy hairs or almost glabrous. The leaves at the base of the plant are linear, lance-shaped or spatula-shaped, 50–200 mm (2.0–7.9 in) long and 20–60 mm (0.79–2.36 in) wide, sometimes with dense whorled hairs. The stem leaves are narrowly elliptic to egg-shaped with the narrower end towards the base, 1–115 mm (0.039–4.528 in) long and 30–40 mm (1.2–1.6 in) wide. The stem leaves are sometimes wavy and have a small, fragile point 1–3 mm (0.039–0.118 in) long. The flowers are pink to purple and borne in cylindrical spikes 20–200 mm (0.79–7.87 in) long and 30–50 mm (1.2–2.0 in) wide. There are egg-shaped bracts 5–10.5 mm (0.20–0.41 in) long and bracteoles 7.5–10.5 mm (0.30–0.41 in) long at the base of the spikes. The tepals are pink to purple and widely spreading as the flowers develop, the outer surface with whorled hairs. There are 3 or 2 stamens, the anthers pink, and 2 or 3 staminodes. Flowering occurs in most months with a peak from October to January.

== Taxonomy ==
Ptilotus exaltatus was first formally described in 1845 by Nees von Esenbeck in Lehmann's Plantae Preissianae. The specific epithet (exaltatus) means 'raised up' or 'tall'.

This species is very similar to P. nobilis and was previously synonymised under that name. Ptilotus exultatus differs in having perianth segments that are pink or purple throughout, (compared to mostly creamy-green) widely gaping mature flowers and dense (compared to sparsely hairy) inner tepals.

== Distribution and habitat ==
Ptilotus exaltatus is found in all Australian states and the Northern Territory. It is widespread in all but the far south of Western Australia where it grows in a variety of habitats, all but the far north of the Northern Territory, in western New South Wales in mallee communities in the north west of Victoria, northern South Australia and western Queensland.

== Use in horticulture ==
Ptilotus exaltatus is a highly desirable Australian native plant due to its abundant and colourful flowers, but its horticultural potential is limited by poor germination rate. The seed dispersal unit of the plant is a 2 mm × 1.5 mm (0.079 in × 0.059 in) nut enclosed by the perianth, which prevents germination. Removal of the perianth sheath surrounding the seed stimulates a 60–80% increase in germination. Germination does not seem to be affected by temperature or light, and two main barriers to germination have been identified – the surrounding perianth tissue and the testa prevent germination in the majority of cases of uncleaned seeds. The removal of these objects which encircle the seed led to a significant increase in germination. Application of slow-release fertiliser as well as application of liquid, nitrogen-based fertiliser promoted plant growth and early flowering. In order to promote rapid growth and flower development while maintaining control of the stem height to ensure a compact plant has been a challenging aspect of successful commercial cultivation of the pink mulla mulla. Research has shown, however, that substantial application of different nitrogen and superphosphate-based fertilisers can result in satisfactory growth control for more widespread horticultural production. Ptilotus exaltatus is known to survive in high-phosphorus soil environments without succumbing to phosphorus toxicity, and as such has been declared a phosphorus hyperaccumulater. It is able to tolerate very high phosphorus levels in soil without suffering a decrease in the leaf and shoot dry weight – a key indicator of plant health. It is able to do so by preferentially accumulating phosphorus in mesophyll cells, forming calcium crystals, and balancing the increased cellular phosphorus by elevating potassium and reducing sulphur levels. Ptilotus exaltatus grows in a variety of habitats including, grasslands, eucalypt woodlands and acacia shrublands. It is found readily on red sands, brown sands, red sandy clays, calcareous loams and stony or gravelly soil. Ptilotus exaltatus thrives best in full sunlight, with 6–8 hours of sunlight per day best for ideal growth. Additionally, given their drought tolerance, minimal watering is required.

The principal use for the species is as a garden plant. The vibrant colours and strong stems provide a favourable aesthetic and their suitability in most Australian conditions means they are appropriate choices for gardens across the country. There is also interest in Ptilotus exaltatus in overseas horticultural industries. Experiments in the growth of P. exaltatus under Central European Conditions indicate an 85% success rate for germination of cleaned seeds under such conditions. Growth tests throughout the year indicated that while it can grow successfully all year round in Australian arid and semi-arid conditions, under Central European conditions, cultivation only resulted in healthy and suitable flowers from the end of April/beginning of May through to the end of September/beginning of October, as conditions were too cold during winter months in the Northern Hemisphere. Pink mulla mulla attracts bees and butterflies leading to an overall increase in garden health when planted in personal gardens. The plant is increasingly being grown in Western Australia in order to produce flowers for export, due to the increasing demand for Australian native plants worldwide. When experimenting with differing quantities of nitrogen, phosphorus and potassium and assessing the effect on growth, the largest amount of applied nitrogen gave the maximum dry weight of shoots.
