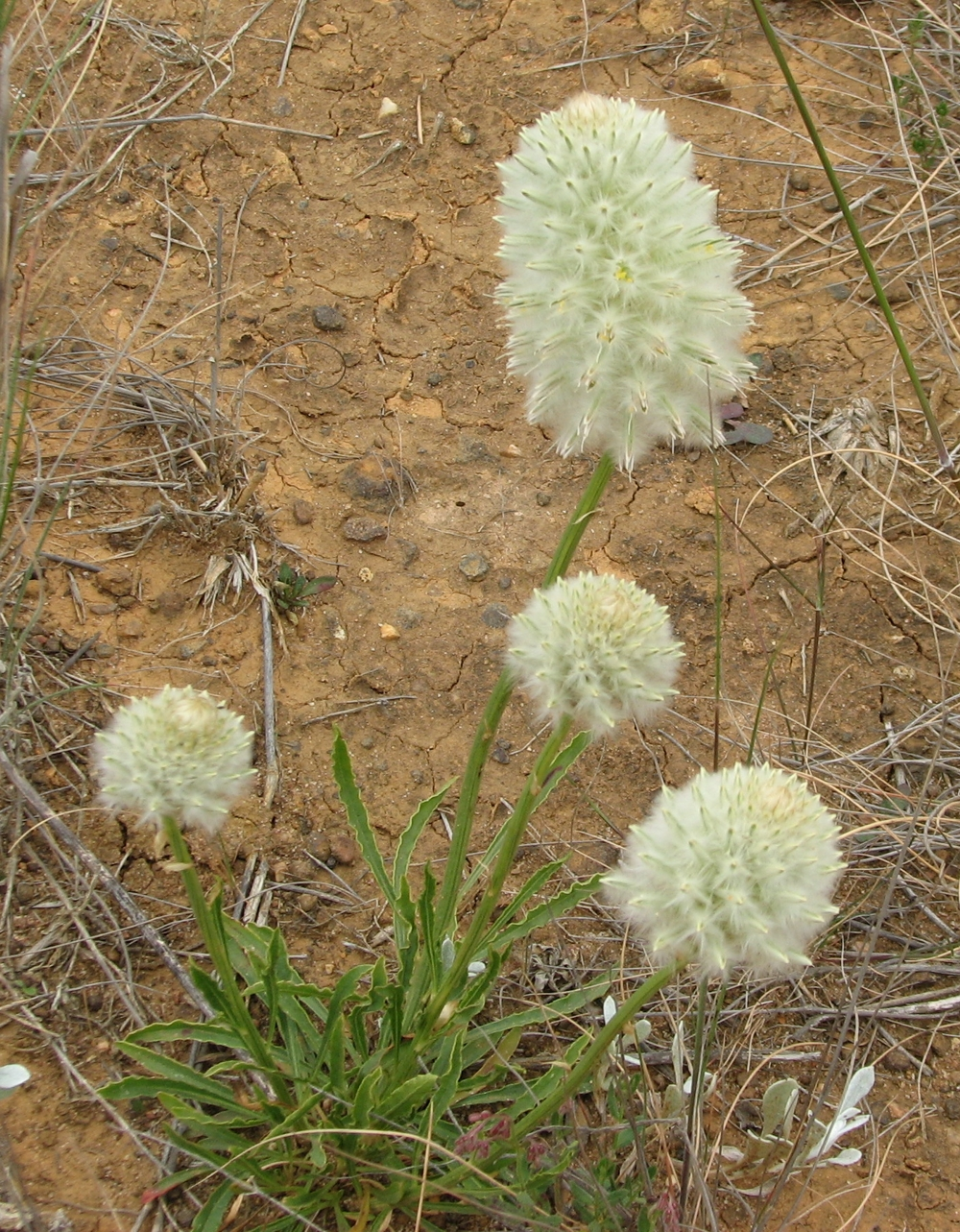

Scientific classification
- Kingdom: Plantae
- Clade: Tracheophytes
- Clade: Angiosperms
- Clade: Eudicots
- Order: Caryophyllales
- Family: Amaranthaceae
- Genus: Ptilotus
- Species: P. macrocephalus

Binomial name
- Ptilotus macrocephalus (R.Br.) Poir.

Synonyms
- List: Ptilotus pachocephalus (Moq.) F.Muell.; Trichinium angustifolium Moq.; Trichinium macrocephalum R.Br.; Trichinium pachocephalum Moq.; Trichinium fusiforme auct. non R.Br.: Lindley, J. in Mitchell, T.L. (1848); Ptilotus macrocephalus auct. non (R.Br.) Poir.: Palmer, J., Lally, T.R. & Miller, C.H. (2014)

= Ptilotus macrocephalus =

Species of plant

Ptilotus macrocephalus, commonly known as green pussytails or featherheads, is a species of flowering plant in the family Amaranthaceae and is endemic to Australia. It is a glabrous or slightly hairy perennial herb, with a woody taproot, linear to narrowly lance-shaped leaves and dense oblong to cylindrical spikes of yellowish green or silvery white flowers.

== Description ==
Ptilotus macrocephalus is a glabrous or slightly hairy perennial herb with a woody taproot, that typically grows to a height of up to about 50 cm (20 in). Its leaves are linear to narrowly lance-shaped or narrowly egg-shaped, about 30–100 mm (1.2–3.9 in) long and 4–12 mm (0.16–0.47 in) wide and thickish and crowded near the base or forming a rosette. The flowers are yellowish green or silvery white and densely arranged in oblong to cylindrical spikes. There are straw-coloured, translucent, egg-shaped to lance-shaped bracts 11–20 mm (0.43–0.79 in) long and elliptic bracteoles shorter than the bracts. The perianth segments are 25–30 mm (0.98–1.18 in) long, the outer surface covered with longhairs apart from the glabrous tip, and the inner surface is glabrous. There are three or four stamens and a staminode, the style is hairy on one side, 17–22 mm (0.67–0.87 in) long and fixed to the side of the ovary. Flowering mainly occurs from October to February.

== Taxonomy ==
This species was first formally described in 1810 by Robert Brown who gave it the name Trichinium macrocephalum in his Prodromus Florae Novae Hollandiae et Insulae Van Diemen. In 1816, Jean Louis Marie Poiret transferred the species to Ptilotus as P. macrocephalus in a supplement to Encyclopédie Méthodique, Botanique. The specific epithet (macrocephalus) means 'large-headed'.

== Distribution and habitat ==
Green pussytails grows in grassland, grassy woodland and heath. While once considered distributed throughout most of the Australian mainland, current research limits the distribution of P. macrocephalus to south-eastern Australia, mostly in south-eastern South Australia, Victoria and New South Wales. A study by Hammer et al. (2019) determined that specimens previously identified as P. macrocephalus are morphologically and ecologically distinct species, the now named Ptilotus xerophilus T.Hammer & R.W.Davis (arid central and western Australia) and Ptilotus psilorhachis T.Hammer & R.W.Davis (eastern Queensland).

== Ecology ==
Ptilotus macrocephalus has cream-green coloured oval flower heads. As with other green-flowered Ptilotus species (e.g. Ptilotus nobilis), they are thought to be predominantly pollinated by nocturnal moths.
