= George Alexander Anstey =

Australian politician

George Alexander Anstey (1814 – 18 Feb 1895) was born at Kentish Town, London. He was the eldest son of Thomas Anstey, an early settler in Van Diemen's Land (Tasmania). George migrated to Tasmania at the age of thirteen and arrived in Hobart in February 1827 with Thomas 'Chiz' Chisholm Anstey, one of his younger brothers, in the ship Admiral Cockburn. At the age of sixteen, he led one of his father's roving parties in the Black War and captured a small tribe of Aboriginals, winning a 500-acre (2 km²) land grant and official praise for his 'humanity and kindness'.

In 1834, Anstey went back to England with one of his sisters; on his return to Tasmania, he was shipwrecked in the D'Entrecasteaux Channel. In 1837 he took sheep to Port Phillip, sold them to John and Somerville Learmonth, and returned to Oatlands, his father's estate. He then took sheep to South Australia, but could not sell them straight away and had to remain in the new colony. By 1840 he had 150 acres (0.6 km^{2}) at his newly acquired estate of Highercombe in the Adelaide Hills. Highercombe was named after a village near Dulverton, Somerset, England - his father's birthplace. With 9000 sheep at the time, he was one of the South Australia's biggest stock-holders. His flocks grew and by 1851 he had extensive pastoral leases on the Yorke and Eyre Peninsulas. The produce of his orchard and vineyard at Highercombe was also winning a wide reputation. Although a 'true liberal' he was defeated by William Giles in two successive polls at Yatala in the first elections for the Legislative Council. Nominated to the first vacancy on 17 December 1851, he resigned on 25 August 1852, despairing of 'a reasonable constitution for the people'.

On 12 September 1837 he married Harriet Kingham, daughter of W. J. Ruffy, sometime editor of the Farmers' Journal, in London; they had nine children. After his father's death he returned to Van Diemen's Land with his wife and two sons, but soon went to England where, after years of constant travel, he died in 1895.

He is remembered by the name Anstey Hill, a geographical feature, and the Anstey Hill Recreation Park in the north eastern suburbs of Adelaide.
