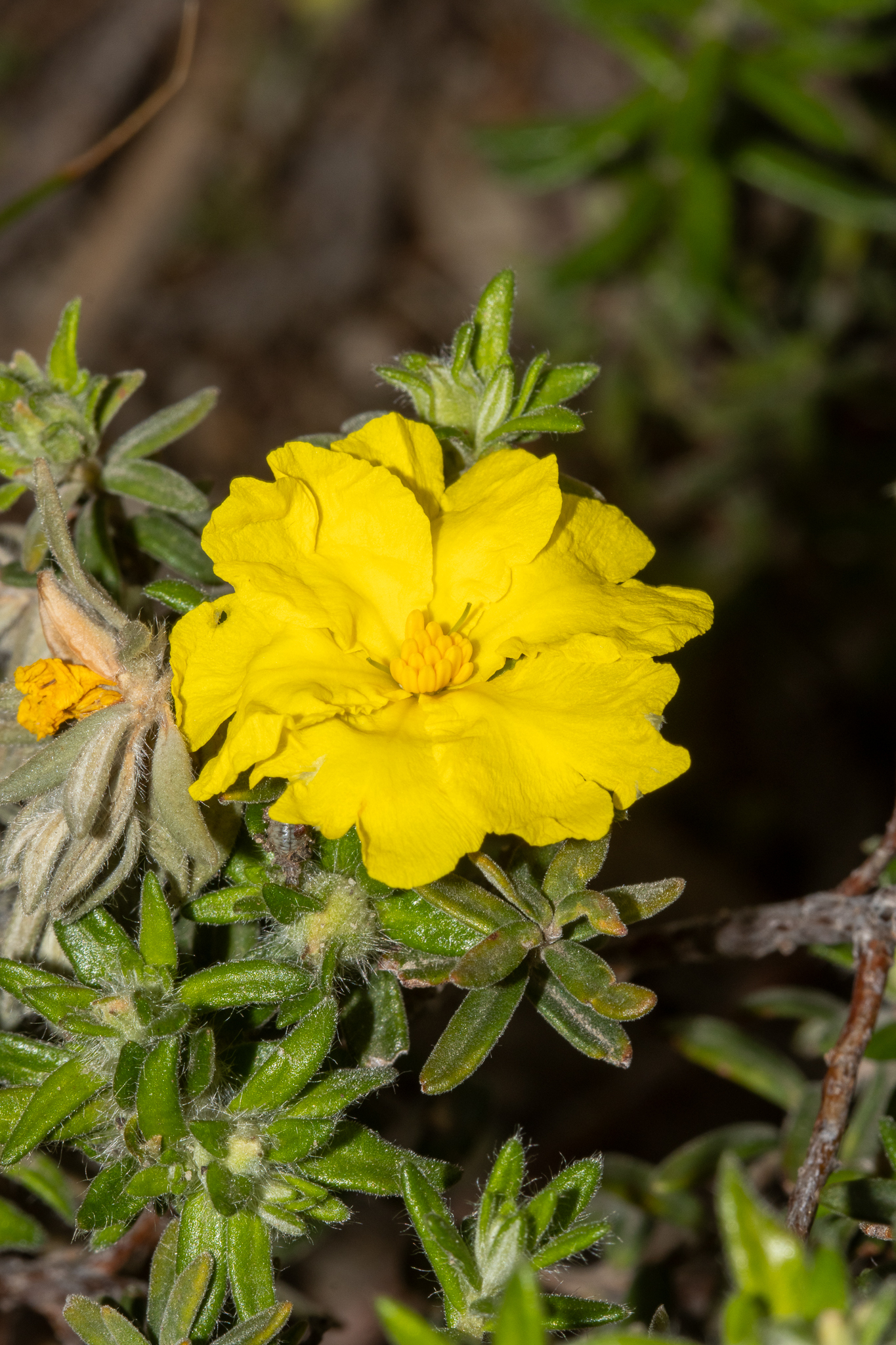
- In Black Hill Conservation Park, South Australia.

Scientific classification
- Kingdom: Plantae
- Clade: Tracheophytes
- Clade: Angiosperms
- Clade: Eudicots
- Order: Dilleniales
- Family: Dilleniaceae
- Genus: Hibbertia
- Species: H. crinita

Binomial name
- Hibbertia crinita Toelken

= Hibbertia crinita =

Species of flowering plant

Hibbertia crinita is a species of flowering plant in the family Dilleniaceae and is endemic to south-eastern continental Australia. It is a spreading to low-lying shrub with hairy foliage, linear to lance-shaped or elliptic leaves and yellow flowers with ten to fifteen stamens arranged on one side of two carpels.

== Description ==
Hibbertia crinita is a spreading to low-lying shrub that typically grows to a height of 0.2–1.5 m (7.9 in – 4 ft 11.1 in), its leaves and branches densely hairy with both long silky and star-shaped hairs. The leaves are linear to lance-shaped or elliptic, 5.2–13.5 mm (0.20–0.53 in) long and 0.8–3.3 mm (0.031–0.130 in) wide with the edges rolled under, almost obscuring the undersurface apart from a central ridge. The flowers are arranged in leaf axils in cluster of up to seven on the ends of branchlets and are sessile, surrounded by leaf-like bracts up to 9 mm (0.35 in) long. The five sepals are fused at the base, the outer sepal lobes 5.3–11.7 mm (0.21–0.46 in) long and the inner lobes 4.8–8.4 mm (0.19–0.33 in) long. The petals are yellow, egg-shaped with the narrower end towards the base, 5.4–13.6 mm (0.21–0.54 in) long and there are eight to sixteen stamens on one side of the two velvety carpels. Flowering occurs from August to October.

The species was previously known as H. incana in New South Wales, a species now thought to be extinct and only known from the type specimen.

== Taxonomy ==
Hibbertia crinita was first formally described in 2000 by Hellmut R. Toelken in the Journal of the Adelaide Botanic Gardens from specimens collected by Nik Donner at the "summit of Mt Torrens" in 1972. The specific epithet (crinita) means "having tufts of long, weak hairs".

== Distribution and habitat ==
This hibbertia grows in heath, woodland and forest, often near granite or sandstone outcrops in shallow, stony soil. It occurs in Victoria, mainly north of the Great Dividing Range, in western New South Wales and in south-eastern South Australia.

== See also ==
- List of Hibbertia species
