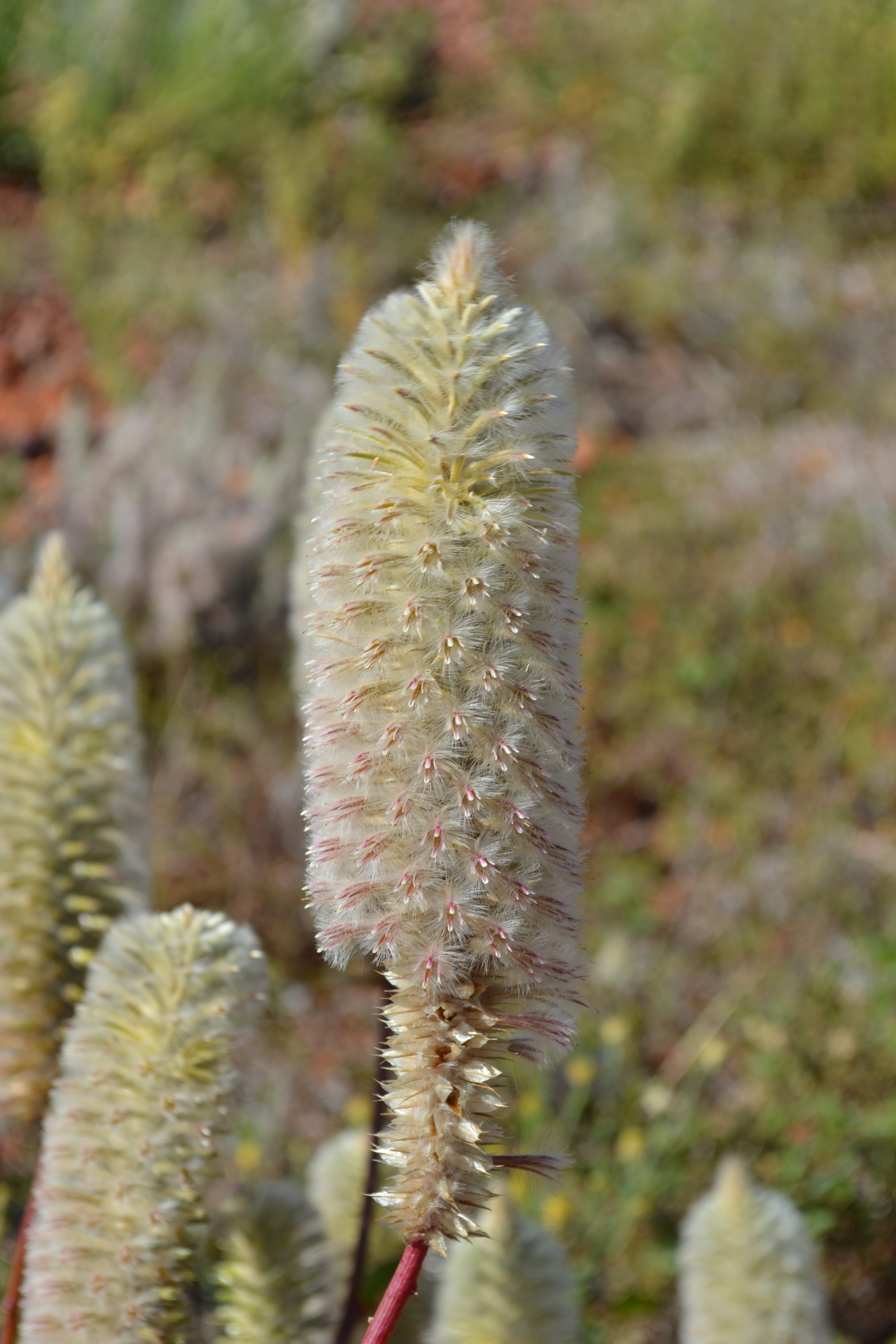

Scientific classification
- Kingdom: Plantae
- Clade: Tracheophytes
- Clade: Angiosperms
- Clade: Eudicots
- Order: Caryophyllales
- Family: Amaranthaceae
- Genus: Ptilotus
- Species: P. nobilis

Binomial name
- Ptilotus nobilis (Lindl.) F.Muell.

Synonyms
- Ptilotus nobilis (Lindl.) F.Muell. subsp. nobilis; Ptilotus nobilis (Lindl.) F.Muell. var. nobilis; Trichinium densum A.Cunn. ex Moq.; Trichinium nobile Lindl.; Trichinium macrocephalum auct. non R.Br.: Moquin-Tandon, C.H.B.A. in Candolle, (1849)

= Ptilotus nobilis =

Species of plant

Ptilotus nobilis, commonly known as yellowtails, regal foxtail or tall mulla mulla, is an annual or short-lived perennial herb of the family Amaranthaceae and is found in arid areas of all mainland states and the Northern Territory of Australia. It is deeply taprooted, with egg-shaped to lance-shaped leaves with the narrower end towards the base, and cylindrical spikes of yellowish green or creamy-green flowers.

== Description ==
Ptilotus nobilis is an erect annual or short-lived perennial herb with several stems, that typically grows to a height of 30–60 cm (12–24 in), sometimes to 1 m (3 ft 3 in). It has egg-shaped to lance-shaped leaves with the narrower end towards the base, 50–140 mm (2.0–5.5 in) long, 10–35 mm (0.39–1.38 in) wide, thick and glabrous at the base of the plant, and similar but smaller stem leaves. The flowers are borne in erect, cylindrical spikes 50–120 mm (2.0–4.7 in) long and 40–50 mm (1.6–2.0 in) in diameter with egg-shaped bracts about 10 mm (0.39 in) long and similar bracteoles at the base. The perianth is 20–25 mm (0.79–0.98 in) long, the tepals free but united at the base with silky hairs on the outer half. There are three or four stamens, the ovary is supported on a stalk with a slightly s-shaped style in the centre. Flowering occurs from August to December.

== Taxonomy ==
This species was first formally described in 1838 by English botanist John Lindley, who gave it the name Trichinium nobile in Thomas Mitchell's Three Expeditions into the interior of Eastern Australia. In 1868, Ferdinand von Mueller transferred the species to Ptilotus as P. nobilis in the sixth volume of his Fragmenta Phytographiae Australiae.

In 2007, a study by Kok K. Lee and others united P. nobilis and Ptilotus exaltatus on molecular grounds, but a morphological and ecological investigation by Tim Hammer and others provided evidence supporting the reinstatment of both species as distinct. The names of both species are accepted by the Australian Plant Census and Plants of the World Online. In Victoria at least, the two species are readily distinguished from each other.

== Distribution and habitat ==
This species of Ptilotus grows in open shrublands, grasslands, open stony plains, gravelly ranges, hills or rises, in fine-textured, loamy, clayey or rocky, sandy soils in Western Australia, South Australia, the Northern Territory, Queensland, the slopes and western plains of New South Wales, and Victoria.
