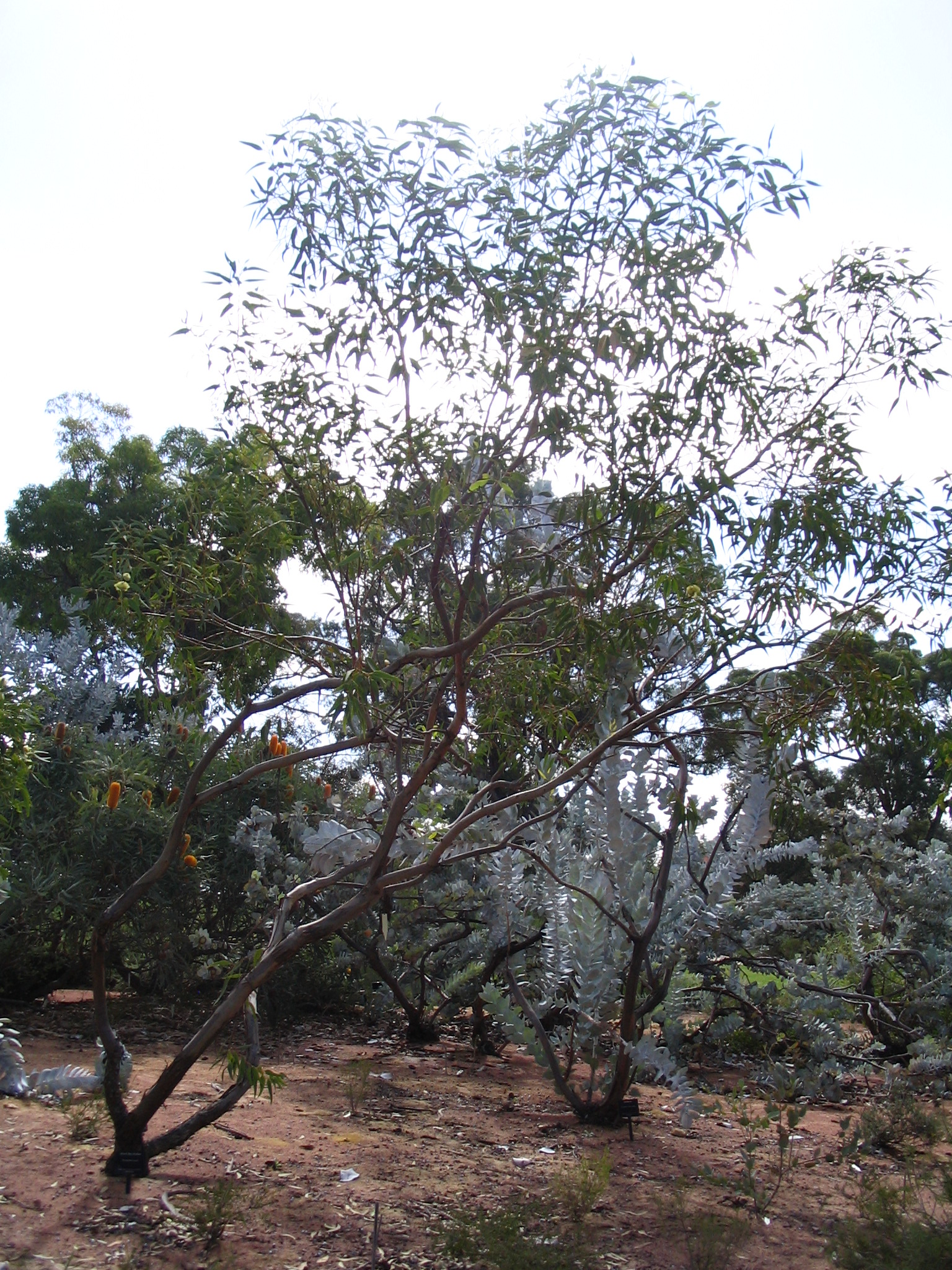
- Eucalyptus roycei in Kings Park

Scientific classification
- Kingdom: Plantae
- Clade: Tracheophytes
- Clade: Angiosperms
- Clade: Eudicots
- Clade: Rosids
- Order: Myrtales
- Family: Myrtaceae
- Genus: Eucalyptus
- Species: E. roycei

Binomial name
- Eucalyptus roycei S.G.M.Carr, D.J.Carr & A.S.George

= Eucalyptus roycei =

Shark Bay mallee

Species of eucalyptus

Eucalyptus roycei, commonly known as Shark Bay mallee, is a species of mallee or a small tree that is endemic to a small area along the Gascoyne coast of Western Australia. It has rough fibrous or flaky bark on the lower trunk, smooth greyish bark above, lance-shaped to curved adult leaves, flower buds in groups of seven or nine, cream-coloured or pale yellow flowers and cylindrical to barrel-shaped, four-sided fruit.

== Description ==
Eucalyptus roycei is a mallee or a small tree that typically that grows to a height of 2–6 m (6 ft 7 in – 19 ft 8 in) and forms a lignotuber. It has rough fibrous or flaky greyish bark at the base, smooth greyish to cream-coloured bark above. Young plants and coppice regrowth have egg-shaped to lance-shaped leaves that are 60–125 mm (2.4–4.9 in) long and 30–60 mm (1.2–2.4 in) wide. Adult leaves are the same shade of dull greyish green on both sides, lance-shaped to curved, 65–140 mm (2.6–5.5 in) long and 18–30 mm (0.71–1.18 in) wide, tapering to a petiole 10–30 mm (0.39–1.18 in) long. The flower buds are arranged in leaf axils in groups of seven or nine on an unbranched peduncle 9–28 mm (0.35–1.10 in) long, the individual buds on pedicels 2–6 mm (0.079–0.236 in) long. Mature buds are cylindrical to oval, 14–21 mm (0.55–0.83 in) long and 8–11 mm (0.31–0.43 in) wide with a conical to rounded operculum and a four-sided floral cup. Flowering occurs between January and March and the flowers are white, cream-coloured or pale yellow. The fruit is a woody, cylindrical to barrel-shaped, four-sided capsule 15–30 mm (0.59–1.18 in) long wide with the valves below the level of the rim.

== Taxonomy ==
Eucalyptus roycei was first formally described in 1970 by Maisie Carr, Denis Carr and Alex George in Proceedings of the Royal Society of Victoria. The type specimen was collected near Hamelin Pool in 1966 by Eleanor Marion Scrymgeour and Maisie Carr. The specific epithet (roycei) honours Robert Dunlop Royce who was a member of the staff of the Western Australian Herbarium.

== Distribution ==
Shark Bay mallee is found on sand plains in the Gascoyne region centred around Shark Bay where it grows in red calcareous sandy soils. The mallee is part of the tree heath community found in Shark Bay at the overlap of the South West botanical province and the Eremaean botanical province. Associated species include Eucalyptus beardiana, Grevillea rogersoniana, Acacia drepanophylla, Banksia ashbyi and Grevillea rogersoniana.

== Use in horticulture ==
The plant is fast-growing and is wind-, drought- and frost-tolerant. It is usually grown in a full-sun position in well-drained soils. Although it is not regarded as a very attractive tree, it is available commercially for bush or park settings.

== See also ==
- List of Eucalyptus species
