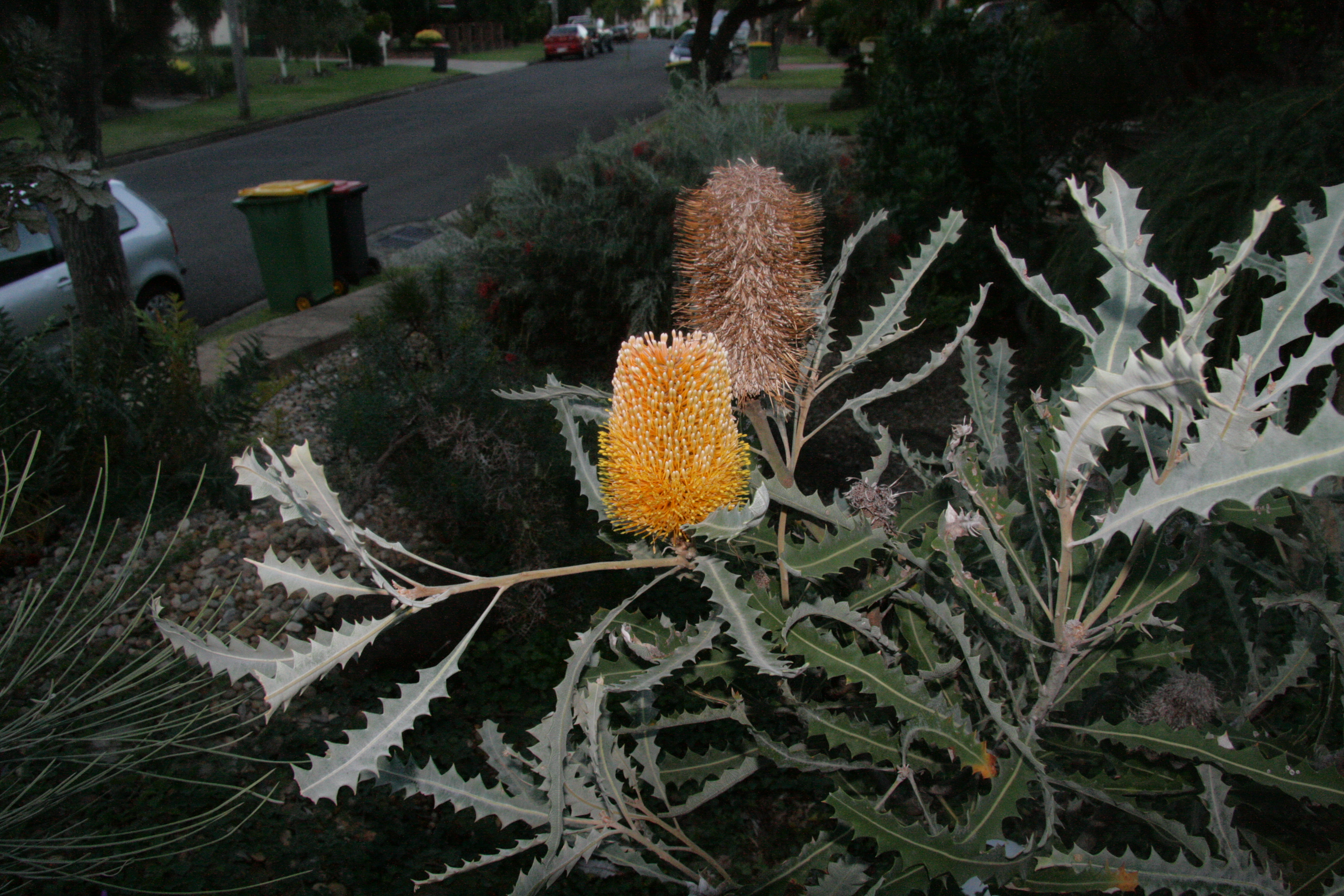

Scientific classification
- Kingdom: Plantae
- Clade: Tracheophytes
- Clade: Angiosperms
- Clade: Eudicots
- Order: Proteales
- Family: Proteaceae
- Genus: Banksia
- Species: B. ashbyi
- Subspecies: B. a. subsp. boreoscaia

Trinomial name
- Banksia ashbyi subsp. boreoscaia A.S.George

= Banksia ashbyi subsp. boreoscaia =

Subspecies of shrub from Western Australia

Banksia ashbyi subsp. boreoscaia is a shrubby, fire-tolerant subspecies of Banksia ashbyi. It is the lignotuberous form of the species, and occurs along the north-west coast of Western Australia, between Carnarvon and North West Cape.

== Description ==
This subspecies is the shrubby, fire-tolerant form of B. ashbyi. It grows as a sprawling shrub up to about 2 m (6 ft 7 in) metres high, with a lignotuber. This is in contrast to the autonymic subspecies, B. ashbyi subsp. ashbyi, which lacks a lignotuber, and grows as a tree up to seven metres in height. In addition, the leaves of B. ashbyi subsp. boreoscaia are consistently grey-green in colour, whereas those of B. ashbyi subsp. ashbyi are usually deep green.

== Taxonomy ==
Banksia ashbyi was first formally described in 1934 by Edmund Gilbert Baker in the Journal of Botany, British and Foreign. The specific epithet honours Edwin Ashby, one of the collectors of the type specimens. Subspecies boreoscaia was first formally described in 2008 by Alex George. Although distinct lignotuberous and non-lignotuberous forms of B. ashbyi had long been recognised, they were not formally described as taxa until George published the lignotuberous form as B. ashbyi subsp. boreoscaia, thus invoking the autonym B. ashbyi subsp. ashbyi for the non-lignotuberous form. George noted that although it is not possible to distinguish between the subspecies from the flowers, fruit or foliage, the distinctive differences in habit are retained in cultivation. For the type specimen of B. ashbyi subsp. boreoscaia, George chose a specimen collected from Quobba Point by Kevin Francis Kenneally on 15 October 1975. The specific epithet boreoscaia is from the Greek borealis ("northern") and skaios ("west"), and refers to the fact that this is the only Banksia taxon to occur in the north-west of Western Australia.

== Distribution and habitat ==
Banksia ashbyi subsp. boreoscaia grows on coastal dunes amongst low shrubland, from Quobba, just north of Carnarvon, north to North West Cape.
