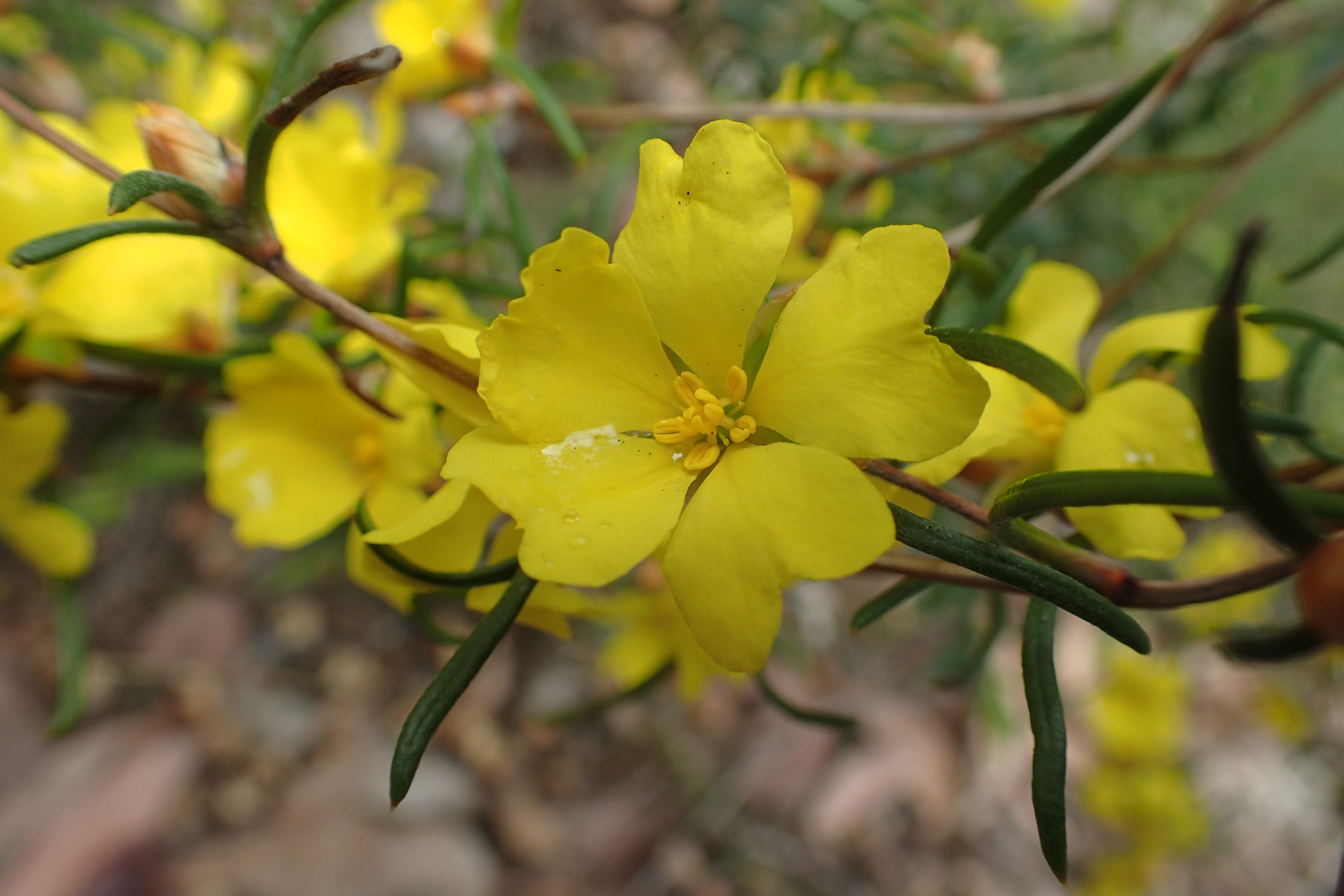

Scientific classification
- Kingdom: Plantae
- Clade: Tracheophytes
- Clade: Angiosperms
- Clade: Eudicots
- Order: Dilleniales
- Family: Dilleniaceae
- Genus: Hibbertia
- Species: H. ferruginea

Binomial name
- Hibbertia ferruginea J.R.Wheeler

= Hibbertia ferruginea =

Species of flowering plant

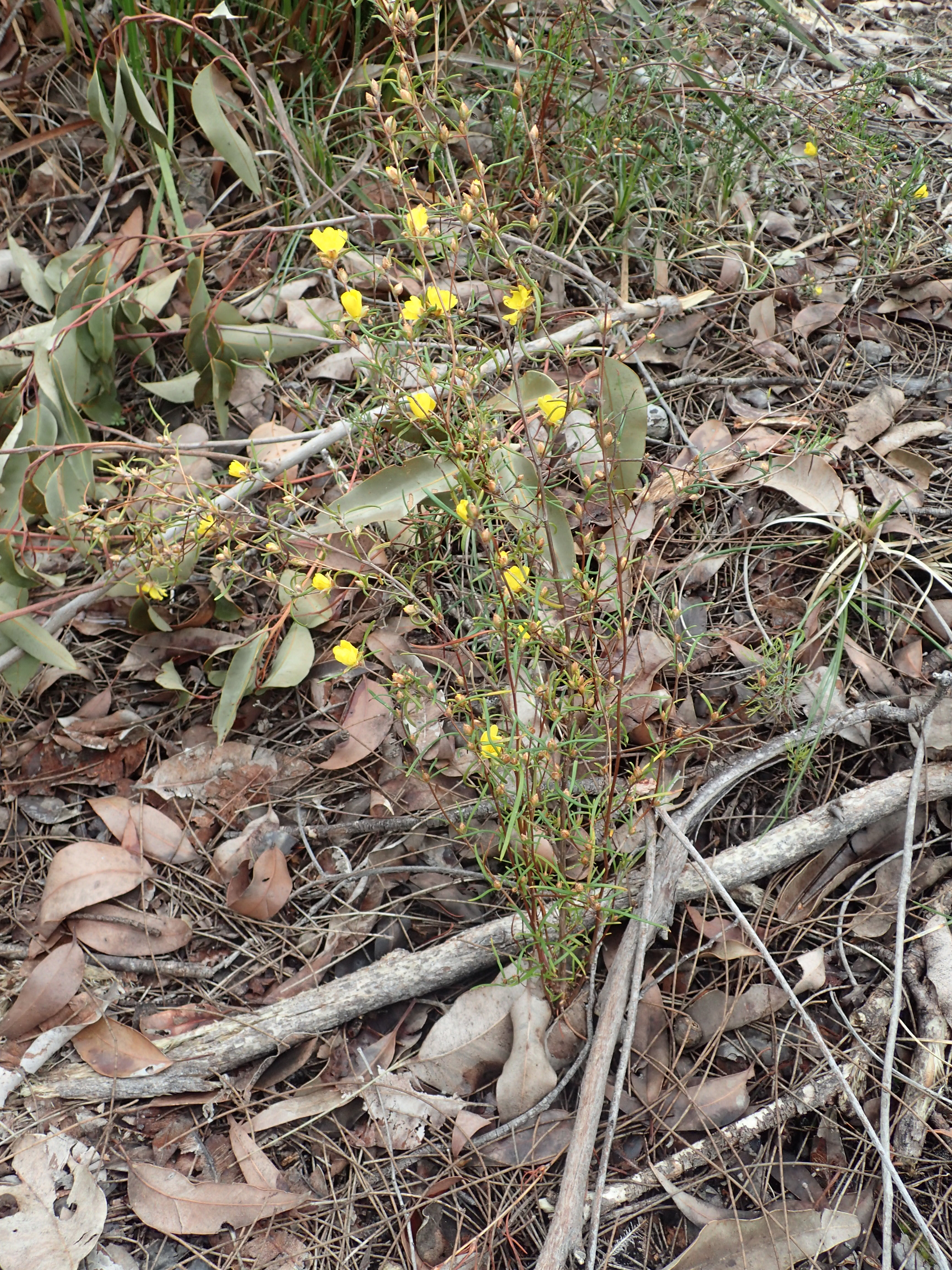
Habit near Nannup

Hibbertia ferruginea is a species of flowering plant in the family Dilleniaceae and is endemic to the south-west of Western Australia. It is an erect or spreading shrub with linear, sessile leaves and yellow flowers borne in leaf axils near the ends of branchlets with fifteen stamens in five groups surrounding the five carpels.

== Description ==
Hibbertia ferruginea is an erect or spreading shrub that typically grows to a height of 10–60 cm (3.9–23.6 in) and has thin stems. The leaves are linear, 15–30 mm (0.59–1.18 in) long, 1.0–1.5 mm (0.039–0.059 in) wide and sessile, sometimes arranged in small bunches. The flowers are borne in leaf axils near the ends of branchlets and are sessile with oblong to egg-shaped, overlapping bracts 4.0–6.5 mm (0.16–0.26 in) long. The five sepals are egg-shaped, 5.0–7.5 mm (0.20–0.30 in) long and the five petals are yellow, egg-shaped with the narrower end towards the base, 6–10 mm (0.24–0.39 in) long and 3–6.5 mm (0.12–0.26 in) wide. There are fifteen stamens arranged in five groups around the five glabrous carpels, each carpel containing a single ovule. Flowering occurs from August to November.

== Taxonnomy ==
Hibbertia ferruginea was first formally described in 1984 by Judy Wheeler in the journal Nuytsia from specimens collected near Busselton by Robert Royce in 1952. The specific epithet (ferruginea) means "rust-coloured" referring to the hairs on the sepals.

== Distribution and habitat ==
This hibbertia grows in woodland or sandy heath from near Capel and Collie to near Busselton and Nannup, in the Jarrah Forest, Swan Coastal Plain and Warren biogeographic regions in the south-west of Western Australia.

== Conservation status ==
Hibbertia ferruginea is classified as "not threatened" by the Government of Western Australia Department of Parks and Wildlife.

== See also ==
- List of Hibbertia species
