= Ptilotus stipitatus =

Scientific classification
- Kingdom: Plantae
- Clade: Embryophytes
- Clade: Tracheophytes
- Clade: Spermatophytes
- Clade: Angiosperms
- Clade: Eudicots
- Order: Caryophyllales
- Family: Amaranthaceae
- Genus: Ptilotus
- Species: P. stipitatus

Binomial name
- Ptilotus stipitatus Benl

Species of plant

Ptilotus stipitatus is a species of flowering plant of the family Amaranthaceae and is endemic to northern inland Western Australia. It is an erect, branched shrub with almost glabrous stems, narrowly egg-shaped leaves and solitary spikes of magenta or red flowers.

== Description ==
Ptilotus stipitatus is an erect, branched shrub that typically grows to a height of 20–60 cm (7.9–23.6 in), its stems mostly glabrous and more or less covered with a powdery bloom when young. Its leaves are mostly narrowly lance-shaped, 5–35 mm (0.20–1.38 in) long and 1.5–7 mm (0.059–0.276 in) wide tapering to an undefined petiole. The flowers are borne in a magenta or red spike on the ends of branches, the spikes 12–18 mm (0.47–0.71 in) long and 20–22 mm (0.79–0.87 in) wide with about 40 flowers. The bracts are egg-shaped, 6.3–7.0 mm (0.25–0.28 in) long and 2.7–3.2 mm (0.11–0.13 in) wide and the bracteoles broadly egg-shaped, 4.5–5.3 mm (0.18–0.21 in) long and 3.3–3.8 mm (0.13–0.15 in) wide. The tepals are lance-shaped, the outer tepals 9.5–11 mm (0.37–0.43 in) long, and the inner tepals 9–10.3 mm (0.35–0.41 in) long and there are five stamens. The style is thread-like, 2.7–3.4 mm (0.11–0.13 in) long and fixed to the side of the club-shaped ovary, 3.0–4.7 mm (0.12–0.19 in) long. The seeds are glossy black and about 1.3 mm (0.051 in) long.

== Taxonomy ==
Ptilotus stipitatus was first formally described in 1980 by Gerhard Benl in the journal Nuytsia from specimens collected 5 mi (8.0 km) north of Jigalong by Robert Dunlop Royce in 1947. The specific epithet (stipitatus) means stipitate, referring to the ovary.

== Distribution and habitat ==
This species of Ptilotus grows in sandy soil on sand dunes in the Gascoyne, Gibson Desert, Great Victoria Desert and Little Sandy Desert bioregions of inland northern Western Australia.

== Conservation status ==
Ptilotus stipitatus is listed as 'not threatened' by the Government of Western Australia Department of Biodiversity, Conservation and Attractions.
