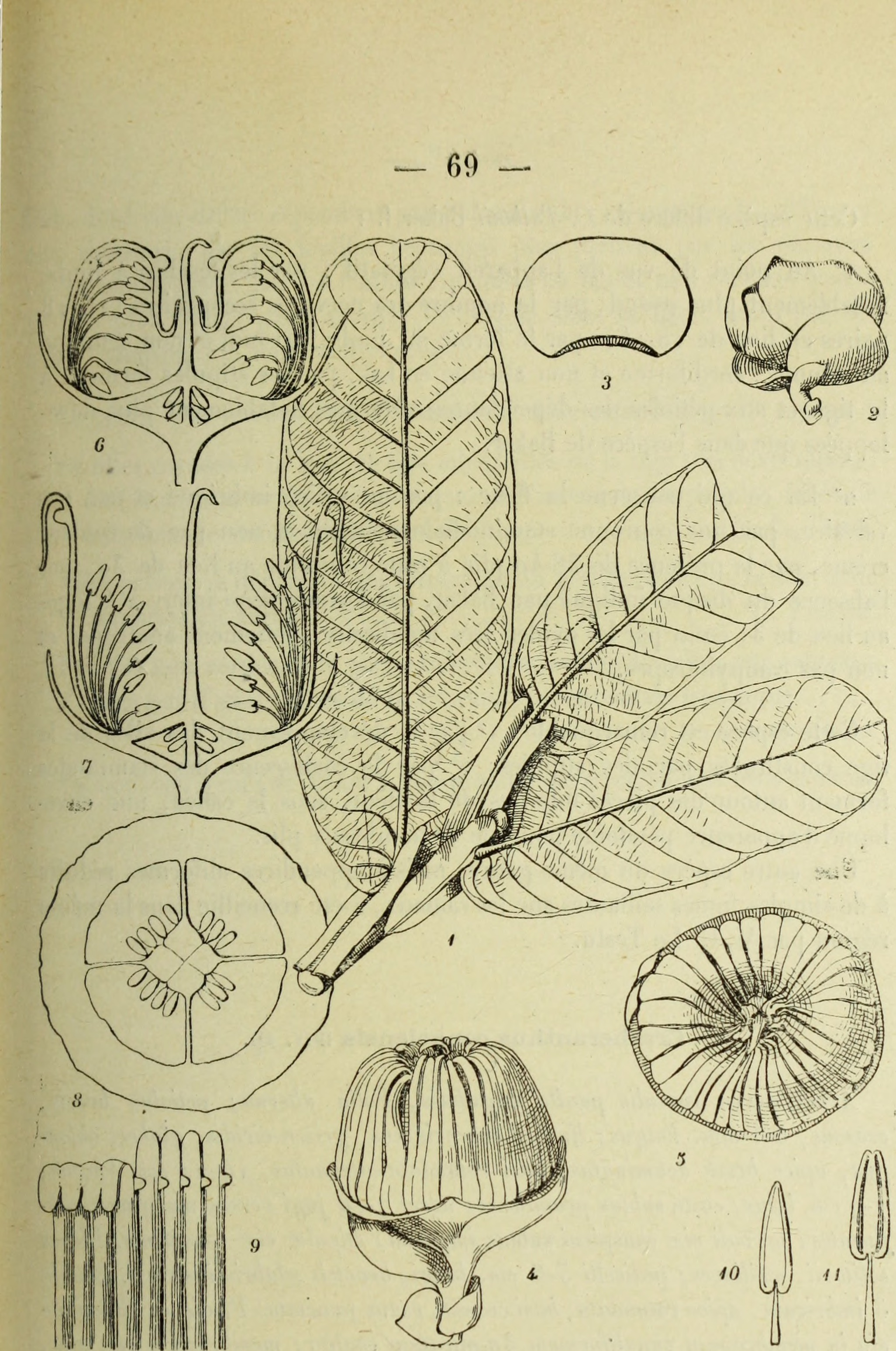
- Crateranthus le-testui

Scientific classification
- Kingdom: Plantae
- Clade: Tracheophytes
- Clade: Angiosperms
- Clade: Eudicots
- Clade: Asterids
- Order: Ericales
- Family: Lecythidaceae
- Genus: Crateranthus; Baker f.

= Crateranthus =

Genus of flowering plants

Crateranthus is a genus of woody plant in the family Lecythidaceae, first described as a genus in 1913. It is native to tropical Africa (Nigeria, Cameroon, Gabon, Republic of Congo, Democratic Republic of Congo).

Species

- Crateranthus cameroonensis Cheek & Prance – Cameroon
- Crateranthus congolensis Lecomte – Gabon, Democratic Republic of Congo
- Crateranthus le-testui Lecomte – Gabon, Republic of Congo
- Crateranthus talbotii Baker f. – Cameroon, Gabon, southern Nigeria
