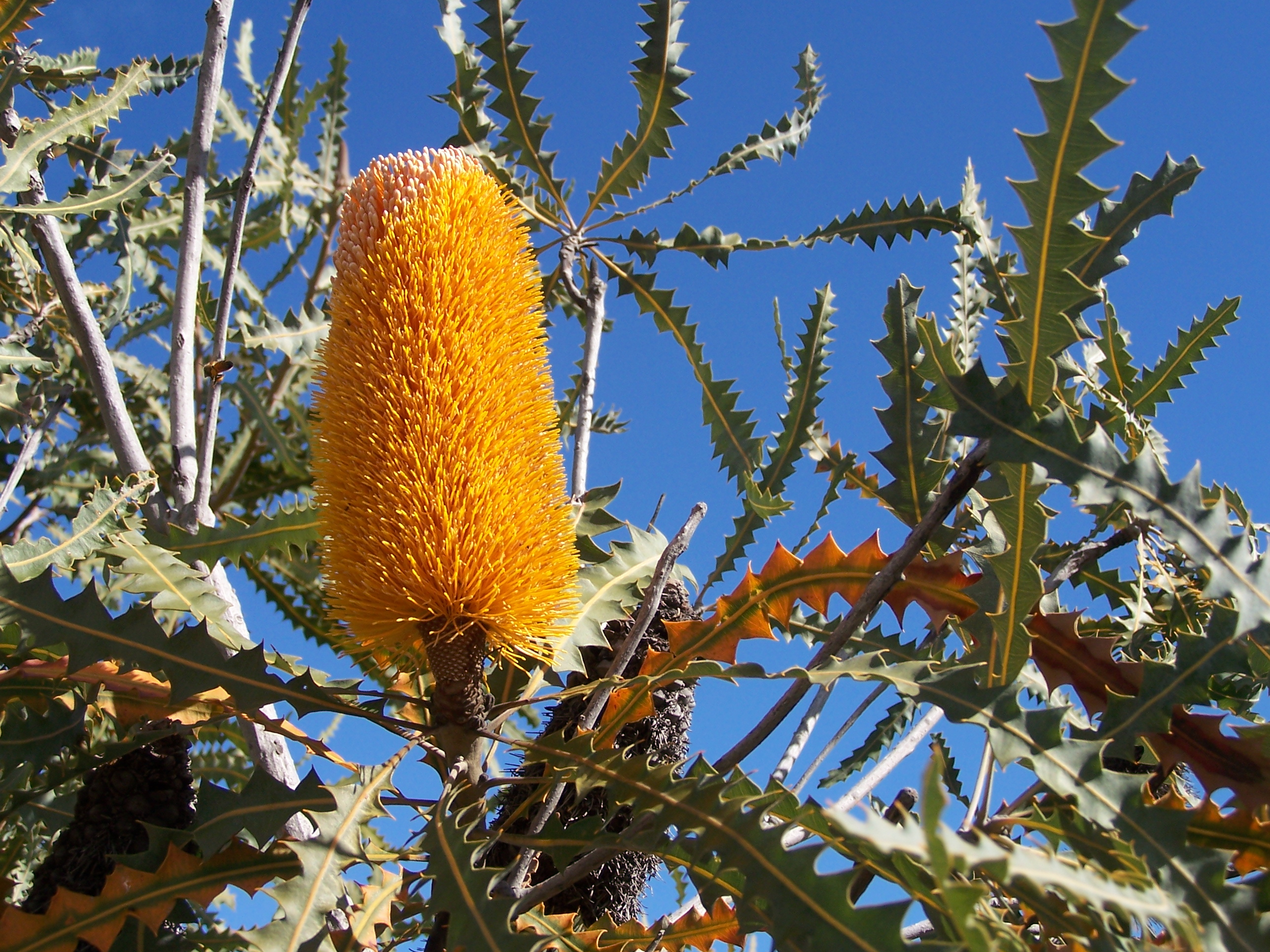

Scientific classification
- Kingdom: Plantae
- Clade: Tracheophytes
- Clade: Angiosperms
- Clade: Eudicots
- Order: Proteales
- Family: Proteaceae
- Genus: Banksia
- Species: B. ashbyi Baker f.
- Subspecies: B. a. subsp. ashbyi

Trinomial name
- Banksia ashbyi subsp. ashbyi

= Banksia ashbyi subsp. ashbyi =

Subspecies of tree found in Australia

Banksia ashbyi subsp. ashbyi is a recently recognised subspecies of Banksia ashbyi. It is the non-lignotuberous arborescent form of the species, which occurs between Geraldton and Shark Bay, and in the Kennedy Ranges.

== Description ==
This subspecies is essentially the fire-sensitive tree form of B. ashbyi. It grows as a tree or shrub up to seven metres (23 ft) in height, and lacks a lignotuber. This is in contrast to the other subspecies, B. ashbyi subsp. boreoscaia, which is a lignotuberous shrub that reaches no higher than two metres (6.6 ft). In addition, B. ashbyi subsp. ashbyi usually has deep green leaves, whereas those of B. ashbyi subsp. boreoscaia are consistently grey-green in colour.

== Distribution and habitat ==
Banksia ashbyi subsp. ashbyi occurs in two disjunct populations: between Geraldton and Shark Bay, and around 400 kilometres (250 mi) further north in the Kennedy Range.

== Taxonomy ==
Although distinct lignotuberous and non-lignotuberous forms of B. ashbyi had long been recognised, they were not formally described as taxa until 2008, when Alex George published the lignotuberous form as B. ashbyi subsp. boreoscaia, thus invoking the autonym B. ashbyi subsp. ashbyi for the non-lignotuberous form.
