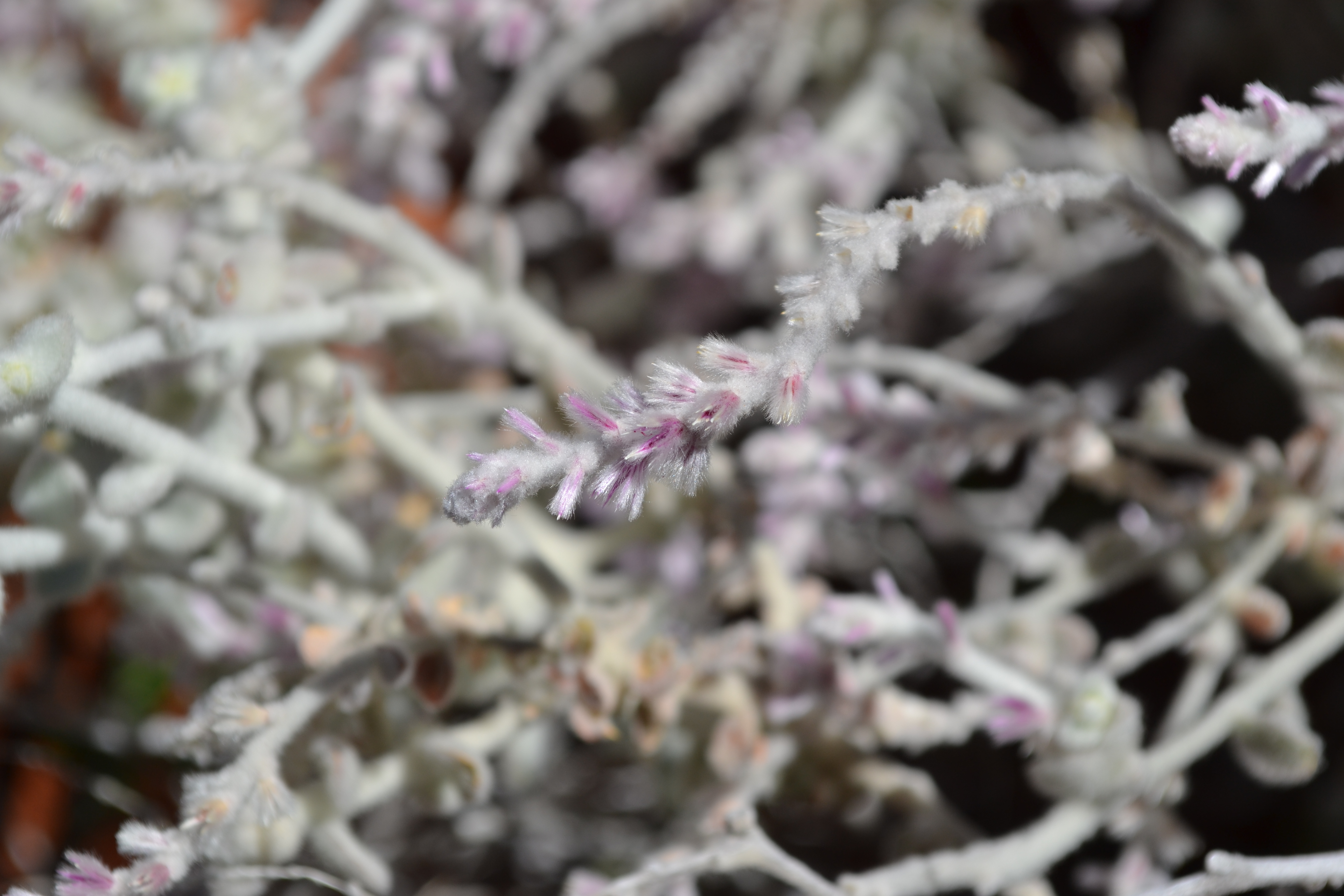

Conservation status
- Priority One — Poorly Known Taxa (DEC)

Scientific classification
- Kingdom: Plantae
- Clade: Tracheophytes
- Clade: Angiosperms
- Clade: Eudicots
- Order: Caryophyllales
- Family: Amaranthaceae
- Genus: Ptilotus
- Species: P. royceanus

Binomial name
- Ptilotus royceanus Benl

= Ptilotus royceanus =

Species of plant

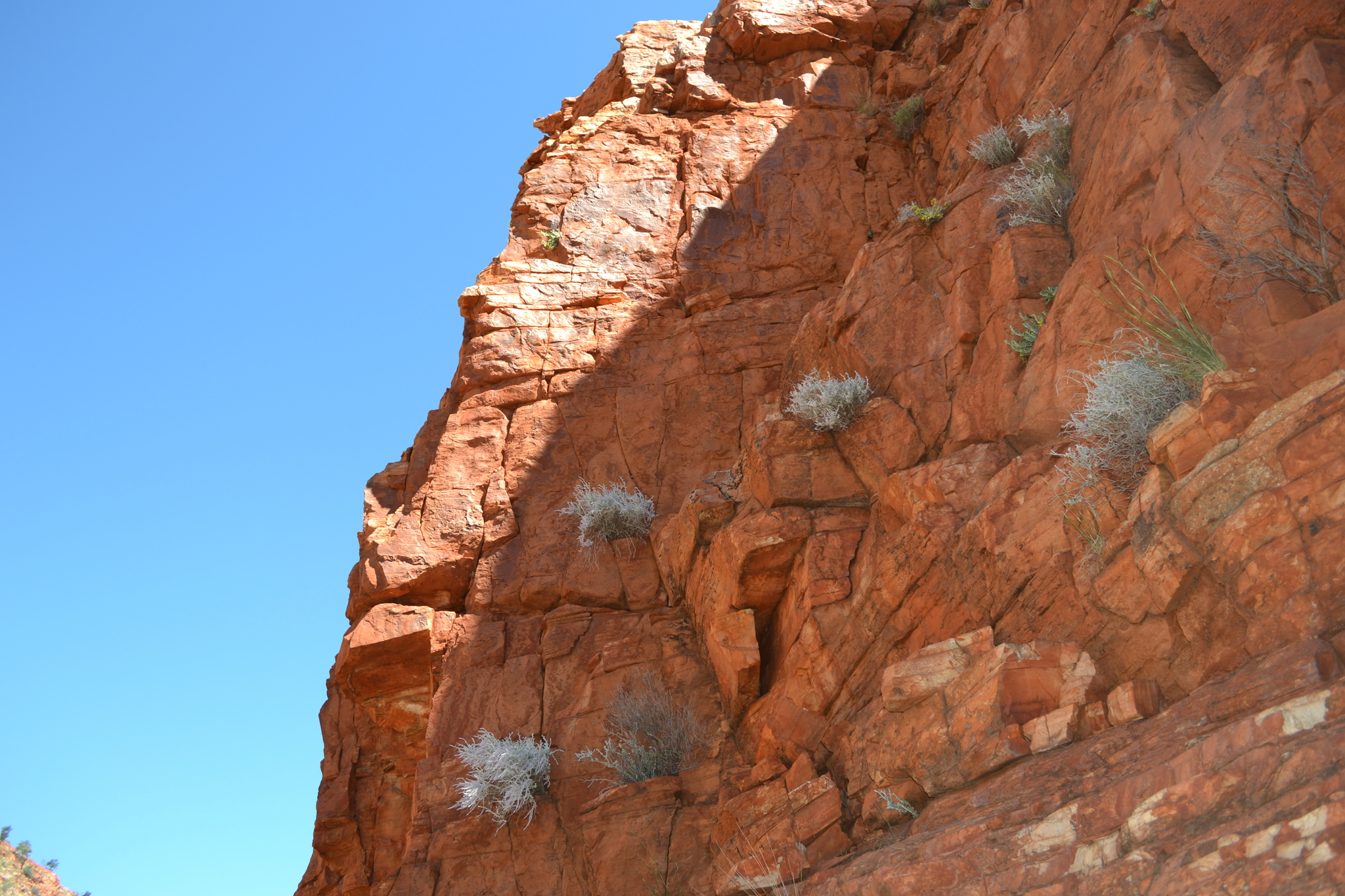
Habitat near Kaltukatjara

Ptilotus royceanus is a species of flowering plant of the family Amaranthaceae and is endemic to Central Australia. It is a perennial herb or shrub with densely woolly stems, round to broadly egg-shaped stem leaves, solitary spikes of pink flowers and glossy, black seeds.

== Description ==
Ptilotus royceanus is a perennial herb or shrub that typically grows to a height of 30–60 cm (12–24 in), its stems densely covered with weak hairs that obscure the surface, later becoming woody and glabrous. The stem leaves are round to broadly egg-shaped, 4–15 mm (0.16–0.59 in) long and 4–10 mm (0.16–0.39 in) wide and sessile or on a petiole up to 2 mm (0.079 in) long, and densely covered with weak, brittle hairs that obscure the surface.

The flowers are borne in spikes, usually on the ends of branches, the spikes 40–50 mm (1.6–2.0 in) long and 8–10 mm (0.31–0.39 in) wide with loosely arranged pink flowers. The bracts are egg-shaped, 1.8–2.2 mm (0.071–0.087 in) long and 0.6–1.2 mm (0.024–0.047 in) wide and the bracteoles narrowly egg-shaped, 2.0–2.4 mm (0.079–0.094 in) long and 0.8–1.2 mm (0.031–0.047 in) wide. The outer tepals are lance-shaped, 4.8–5.8 mm (0.19–0.23 in) long, and the inner tepals lance-shaped, 4.5–5.5 mm (0.18–0.22 in) long and there are five stamens. The style is straight, 1.0–1.4 mm (0.039–0.055 in) long and fixed to the centre of the pink, densely hairy ovary, 0.9–1.2 mm (0.035–0.047 in) long and 0.8–1.0 mm (0.031–0.039 in) wide. The seeds are glossy black and about 1.3 mm (0.051 in) long.

== Taxonomy ==
Ptilotus royceanus was first formally described in 1970 by Gerhard Benl in the Journal of the Royal Society of Western Australia from specimens collected at the Bungabiddy Rockhole in the Walter James Range in the far east of Western Australia, by Alex George in 1966. The specific epithet (royceanus) honours Robert Dunlop Royce.

== Distribution and habitat ==
This species of Ptilotus is restricted to the Petermann Ranges on the Northern Territory - Western Australia border in the Central Ranges bioregion where it grows on rock walls and cliffs.

== Conservation status ==
Ptilotus royceanus is listed as "Priority One" by the Government of Western Australia Department of Biodiversity, Conservation and Attractions, meaning that it is known from only one or a few locations that are potentially at risk. and as 'near threatened' under the Territory Parks and Wildlife Conservation Act.
