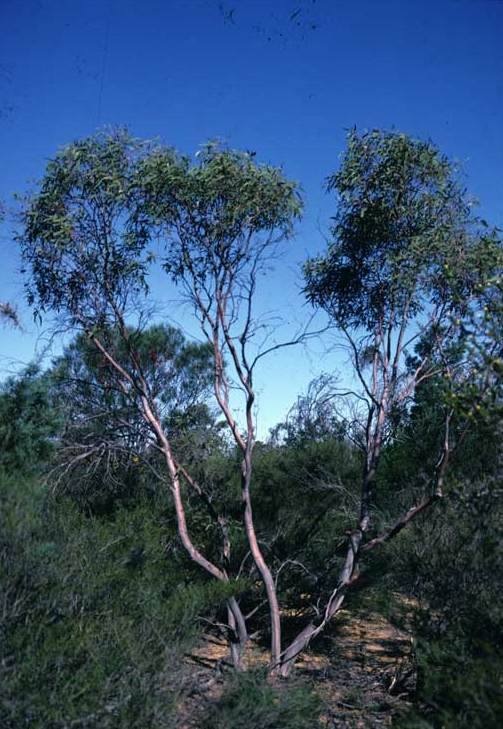
- Eucalyptus beardiana growing in the North Murchison

Conservation status
- Critically Endangered (IUCN 3.1)

Scientific classification
- Kingdom: Plantae
- Clade: Tracheophytes
- Clade: Angiosperms
- Clade: Eudicots
- Clade: Rosids
- Order: Myrtales
- Family: Myrtaceae
- Genus: Eucalyptus
- Species: E. beardiana

Binomial name
- Eucalyptus beardiana Brooker & Blaxell

= Eucalyptus beardiana =

Beard's mallee

Species of eucalyptus

Eucalyptus beardiana, commonly known as Beard's mallee, is a mallee that is endemic to Western Australia. It has smooth pinkish bark, narrow lance-shaped to curved adult leaves, flower buds usually in groups of nine, pale yellow flowers and down-turned, hemispherical fruit.

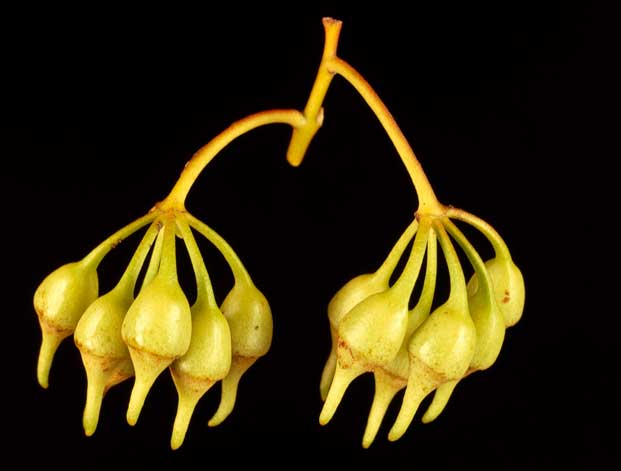
E. beardiana flower buds

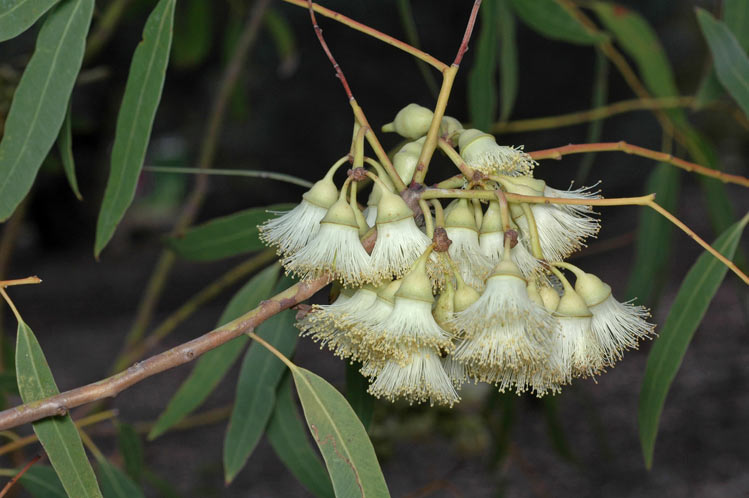
E. beardiana flowers

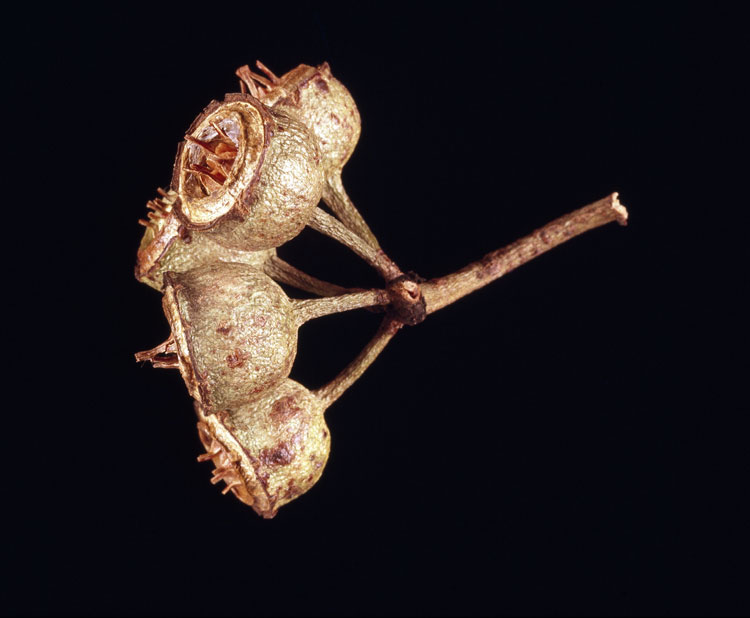
E. beardiana fruit

== Description ==
Eucalyptus beardiana is a spreading mallee that typically grows to a height of 3 to 5 metres (10 to 16 ft) and forms a lignotuber. It has smooth grey, cream-cloloured or pinkish bark from the trunk to the thinnest branches. Young plants and coppice regrowth have dull, narrow lance-shaped leaves 20–90 mm (0.79–3.5 in) long and 5–35 mm (0.2–1 in) wide and have a petiole. Adult leaves are lance-shaped to curved, mostly 75–130 mm (3.0–5.1 in) long and 7–15 mm (0.3–0.6 in) wide, narrowing at the base to a petiole 10–23 mm (0.39–0.91 in) long.

The flowers are usually borne in groups of nine, rarely eleven, in leaf axils on an unbranched peduncle 20–30 mm (0.8–1 in) long, the individual flowers on a pedicel 12–14 mm (0.5–0.6 in) long. Mature buds are oval, 19–22 mm (0.7–0.9 in) long and 7–9 mm (0.3–0.4 in) wide with a finely beaked operculum about 14 mm (0.6 in) long. Flowering mainly occurs from August to September and the flowers are pale yellow to creamy white. The fruit that follows is a woody, hemispherical capsule 7 to 10 mm (0.28 to 0.39 in) long and 9 to 13 mm (0.35 to 0.51 in) with a slightly flared rim.

== Taxonomy and naming ==
Eucalyptus beardiana was first formally described in 1978 by Ian Brooker and Donald Blaxell who published the description in the journal Nuytsia from a specimen collected near Shark Bay. The specific epithet (beardiana) honours John Stanley Beard. The authors considered it appropriate that "his long association with the botany of Western Australia should be perpetuated by a species endemic to the state".

== Distribution and habitat ==
Beard's mallee grows in tree heath, tall open shrubland in association with species including Yuna mallee, mallalie, Eucalyptus gittinsii, sceptre banksia, Ashby's banksia, broom honey-myrtle as well as other species of Acacia, Grevillea and Persoonia. It is found on sandplain between the Murchison River and Shark Bay.

== Conservation ==
Eucalyptus beardiana is classified as "endangered" under the Australian Government Environment Protection and Biodiversity Conservation Act 1999 and as "Threatened Flora (Declared Rare Flora — Extant)" by the Department of Environment and Conservation (Western Australia). The main threat to the species is habitat disturbance due to firebreak and track maintenance and by grazing animals and weed invasion.

== See also ==
- List of Eucalyptus species
