= Acacia drepanophylla =

Conservation status
- Priority Three — Poorly Known Taxa (DEC)

Scientific classification
- Kingdom: Plantae
- Clade: Tracheophytes
- Clade: Angiosperms
- Clade: Eudicots
- Clade: Rosids
- Order: Fabales
- Family: Fabaceae
- Subfamily: Caesalpinioideae
- Clade: Mimosoid clade
- Genus: Acacia
- Species: A. drepanophylla

Binomial name
- Acacia drepanophylla Maslin
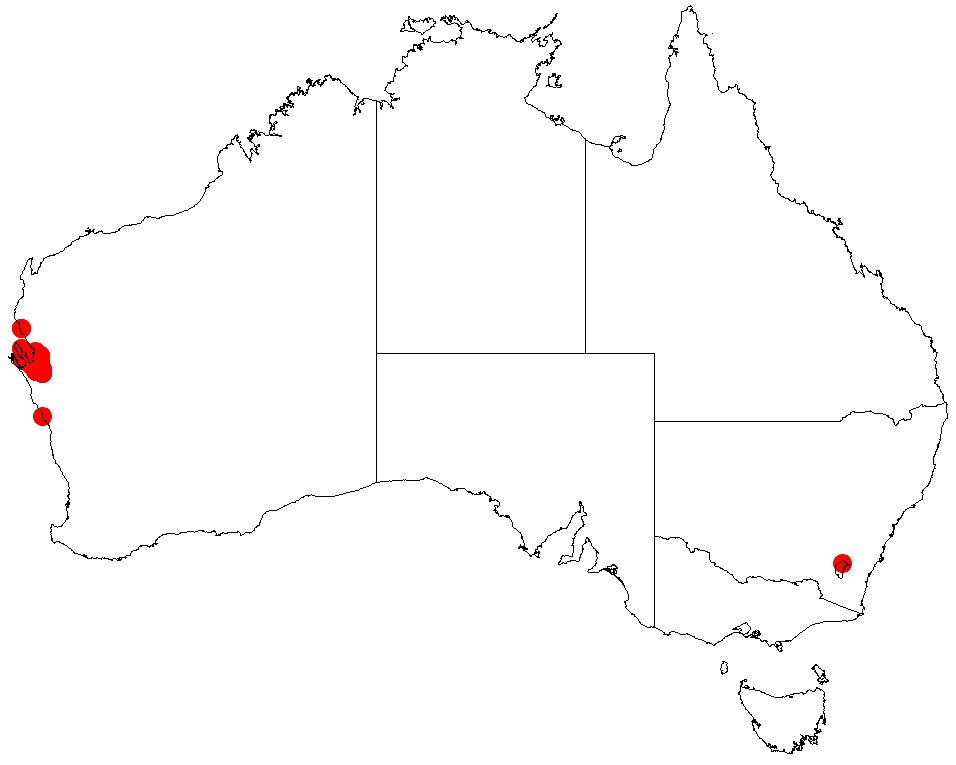
- Occurrence data from AVH

Synonyms
- Racosperma drepanophyllum (Maslin) Pedley

Species of legume

Acacia drepanophylla is a species of flowering plant in the family Fabaceae and is endemic to the far west of Western Australia. It is a tree with fibrous bark and glabrous branchlets, widely spreading linear, sickle-shaped, glabrous phyllodes spikes of pale yellow flowers, and linear, firmly papery to thinly leathery pods.

== Description ==
Acacia drepanophylla is a tree that typically grows to a height of 2.5–5 m (8 ft 2 in – 16 ft 5 in) and has fissured, fibrous grey bark and glabrous branchlets. Its phyllodes are widely spreading, linear, sickle-shaped, mostly 150–200 mm (5.9–7.9 in) long, 3–6 mm (0.12–0.24 in) wide and finely striated with the midvein more obvious than the other veins. The flowers are pale yellow and borne in two spikes about 15 mm (0.59 in) long and about 5 mm (0.20 in) in diameter in axils on peduncles 1–3 mm (0.039–0.118 in) long. Flowering occurs from May to July and the pods are linear, flat, but rounded over and slightly constricted between the seeds, firmly papery to thinly leathery, up to 115 mm (4.5 in) long and 8–11 mm (0.31–0.43 in) wide and glabrous. The seeds are compressed globe-shaped, 5–6 mm (0.20–0.24 in) in diameter and dull, grey-brown with a small aril.

== Taxonomy ==
Acacia drepanophylla was first formally described in 1983 by the Bruce Maslin in the journal Nuytsia from specimens he collected 25.5 km (15.8 mi) north of the Overlander Roadhouse on the North West Coastal Highway in 1972. The specific epithet (drepanophylla) means 'sickle-shaped', referring to the characteristically-shaped phyllodes.

This species is related to A. oldfieldii which grows nearby, it is also related to [A. acuminata which is found further south.

== Distributionand habitat ==
This species of wattle is common throughout its range, and is sometimes dominant. It grows in shallow red clay or loam over limestone in Acacia scrub and shrubland and is restricted to the Shark Bay area between Yaringa Station and south to Wannoo in the Carnarvon, and Yalgoo bioregions in the far west of Western Australia.

== Conservation status ==
Acacia drepanophylla is listed as "Priority Three" by the Government of Western Australia Department of Biodiversity, Conservation and Attractions, meaning that it is poorly known and known from only a few locations but is not under imminent threat.

== See also ==
- List of Acacia species
