= Crateranthus talbotii =

Conservation status
- Vulnerable (IUCN 3.1)

Scientific classification
- Kingdom: Plantae
- Clade: Tracheophytes
- Clade: Angiosperms
- Clade: Eudicots
- Clade: Asterids
- Order: Ericales
- Family: Lecythidaceae
- Genus: Crateranthus
- Species: C. talbotii

Binomial name
- Crateranthus talbotii Baker f.

Species of flowering plant

Crateranthus talbotii is a species of woody plant in the Lecythidaceae family. It is found in Cameroon and Nigeria. Its natural habitats are subtropical or tropical moist lowland forests and subtropical or tropical swamps. It is threatened by habitat loss.
