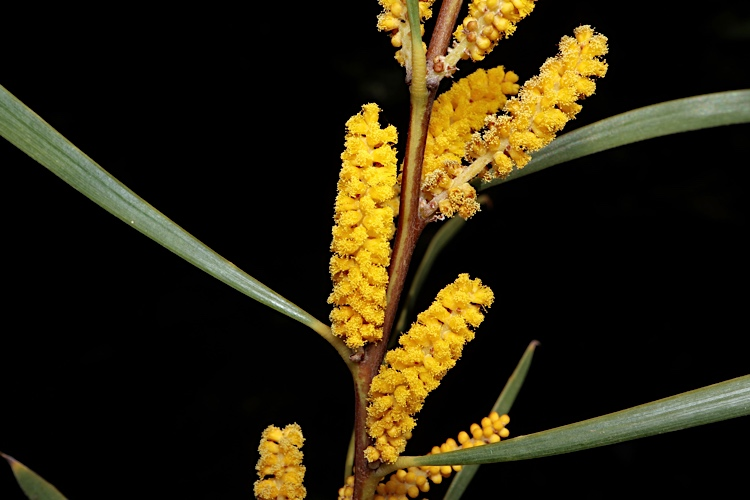
- In the Australian National Botanic Gardens

Scientific classification
- Kingdom: Plantae
- Clade: Tracheophytes
- Clade: Angiosperms
- Clade: Eudicots
- Clade: Rosids
- Order: Fabales
- Family: Fabaceae
- Subfamily: Caesalpinioideae
- Clade: Mimosoid clade
- Genus: Acacia
- Species: A. oldfieldii

Binomial name
- Acacia oldfieldii F.Muell.
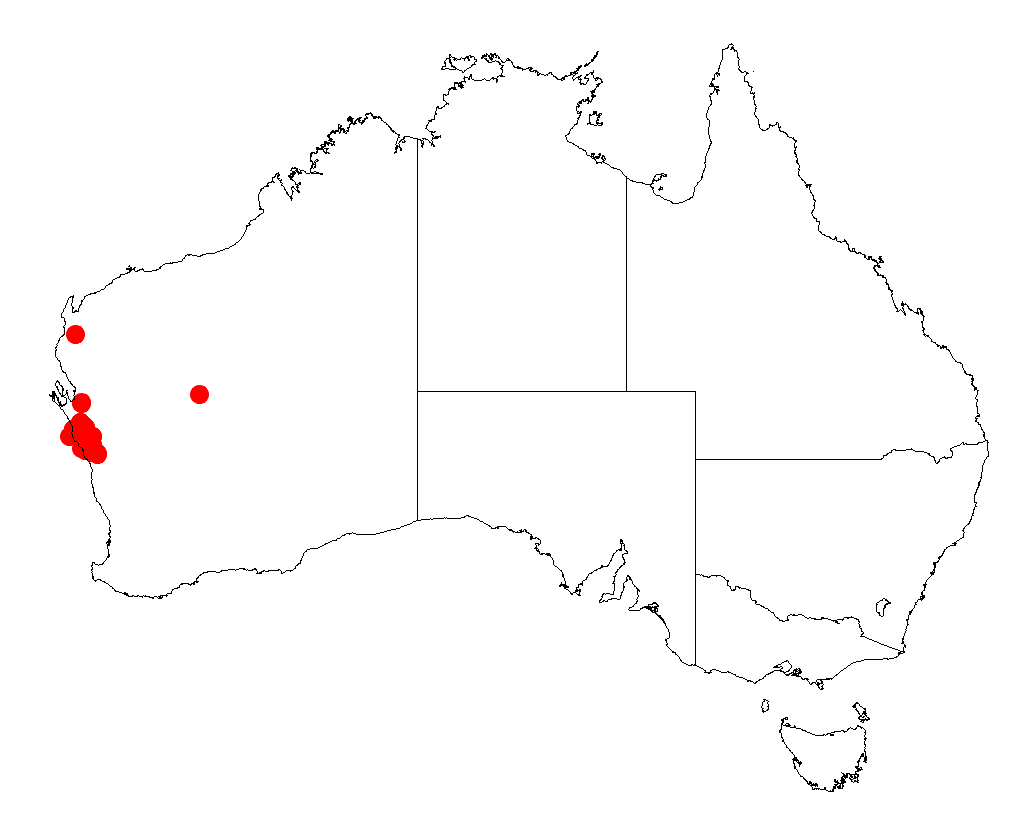
- Occurrence data from AVH

Synonyms
- Racosperma oldfieldii (F.Muell.) Pedley

= Acacia oldfieldii =

Species of legume

Acacia oldfieldii is a species of flowering plant in the family Fabaceae, and is endemic the western Western Australia. It is a bushy shrub or straggly tree, with glabrous branchlets, linear, thinly leathery phyllodes, spikes of bright golden yellow flowers and linear, thinly leathery pods more or less raised over the seeds.

== Description ==
Acacia oldfieldii is a bushy shrub or straggly tree, that typically grows to a height of 1.5–5 m (4 ft 11 in – 16 ft 5 in) and has glabrous branchlets and silky citron yellow new growth. Its phyllodes are linear to lance-shaped with the narrower end towards the base, 70–165 mm (2.8–6.5 in) long, 3–5 mm (0.12–0.20 in) wide, glabrous, thinly leathery with many closely parallel veins, and yellow edges. The flowers are bright golden yellow and loosely borne in spikes commonly 30–45 mm (1.2–1.8 in) long and 4–5 mm (0.16–0.20 in) in diameter on peduncles 1.5–4 mm (0.059–0.157 in) long. Flowering occurs from June to September, and the pods are linear, thinly leathery, up to 100 mm (3.9 in) long and 2–4 mm (0.079–0.157 in) wide and glabrous. The seeds are elliptic, 3.5–4.0 mm (0.14–0.16 in) long and glossy black, with an aril on the end.

== Taxonomy ==
Acacia oldfieldii was first formally described in 1863 by Ferdinand von Mueller in his Fragmenta Phytographiae Australiae from specimens collected by Augustus Frederick Oldfield from near the Murchison River. The specific epithet (oldfieldii) honours Augustus Oldfield.

== Distribution and habitat ==
This species of wattle grows in sand, sandy loam and clayey sand in dense sandplain scrub or shrubland on rises and rocky plains, and is common in coastal areas between Eradu and Kalbarri National Park, in the Geraldton Sandplains bioregions of western parts of Western Australia.

== See also ==
- List of Acacia species
