= Grevillea rogersoniana =

Conservation status
- Priority Three — Poorly Known Taxa (DEC)

Scientific classification
- Kingdom: Plantae
- Clade: Tracheophytes
- Clade: Angiosperms
- Clade: Eudicots
- Order: Proteales
- Family: Proteaceae
- Genus: Grevillea
- Species: G. rogersoniana

Binomial name
- Grevillea rogersoniana C.A.Gardner

Species of shrub endemic to Western Australia

Grevillea rogersoniana, commonly known as Rogerson's grevillea, is a species of flowering plant in the family Proteaceae and is endemic to a restricted area near Shark Bay in Western Australia. It is an erect shrub with spatula-shaped leaves with 3 to 5 teeth or shallow lobes on the end, and cylindrical clusters of reddish pink flowers, the style with a cream-coloured tip.

== Description ==
Grevillea rogersoniana is an erect shrub that typically grows to a height of 1–4 m (3 ft 3 in – 13 ft 1 in), but sometimes to as much as 8 m (26 ft). Its leaves are spatula-shaped to wedge-shaped, 40–100 mm (1.6–3.9 in) long and 4–35 mm (0.16–1.38 in) wide with 3 to 5 rounded teeth or shallow lobes on the end. Both sides of the leaves are silky-hairy at first, but soon glabrous. The flowers are arranged on the ends of branches in cylindrical clusters on a rachis 40–60 mm (1.6–2.4 in) long. The flowers are bronze-coloured in the bud stage, later reddish pink, the style pink with a cream-coloured tip, the pistil 14–18 mm (0.55–0.71 in) long. Flowering occurs from August to October, and the fruit is a glabrous, elliptic to more or less spherical follicle 13.5–20 mm (0.53–0.79 in) long.

== Taxonomy ==
Grevillea rogersoniana was first formally described in 1964 by Charles Gardner in the Journal of the Royal Society of Western Australia from specimens he collected near Shark Bay. The specific epithet (rogersoniana) honours "Mrs. W. Rogerson", who directed Gardner to this species in 1961.

== Distribution and habitat ==
Rogerson's grevillea grows in tall woodland or Banksia scrub on sand dunes in an area south of Shark Bay, in the Carnarvon, Geraldton Sandplains and Yalgoo bioregions of Western Australia.

== Conservation status ==
Grevillea rogersoniana is listed as "Priority Three" by the Government of Western Australia Department of Biodiversity, Conservation and Attractions, meaning that it is poorly known and known from only a few locations but is not under imminent threat.

== See also ==
- List of Grevillea species
