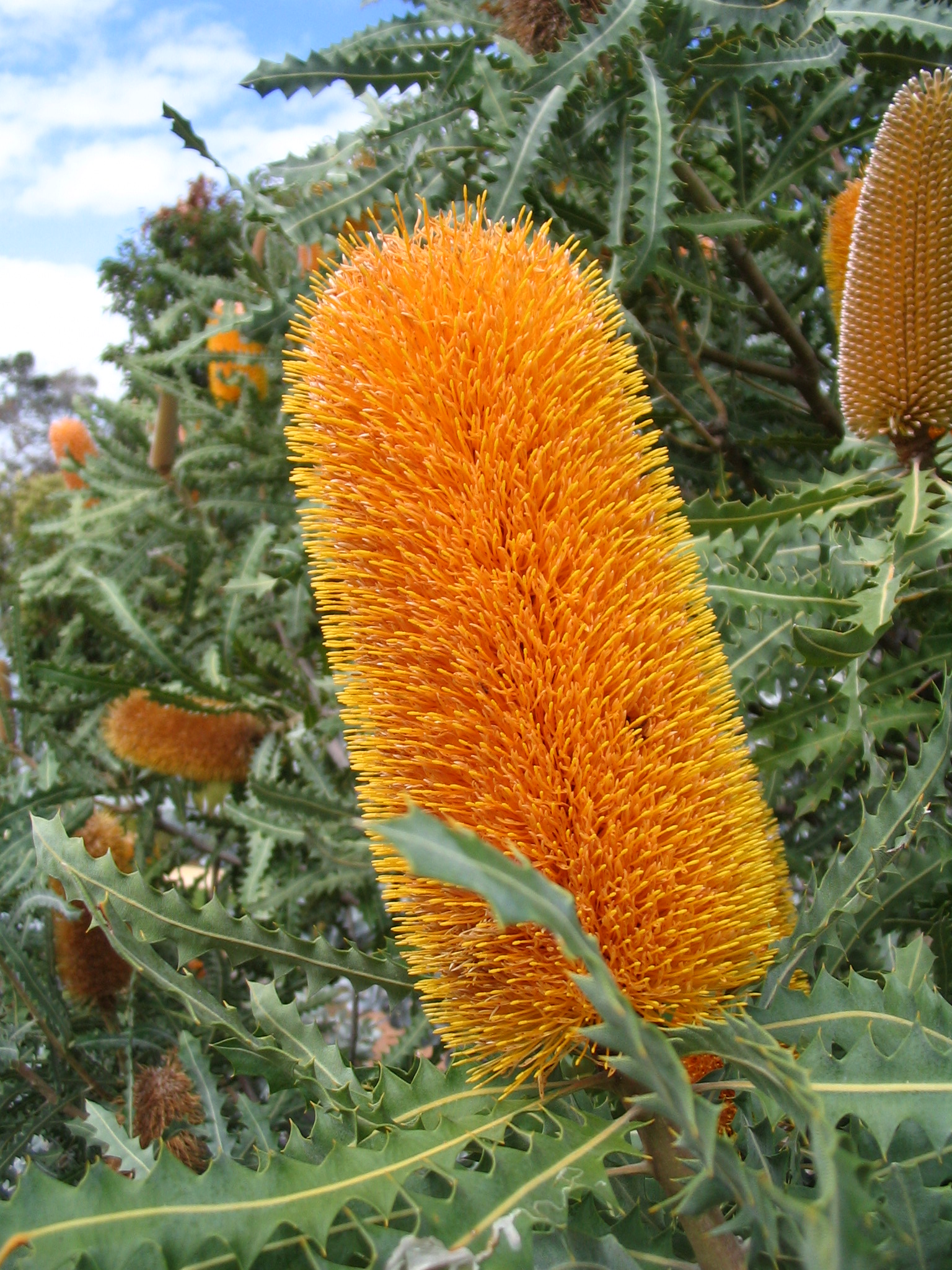
- In Kings Park, Western Australia

Scientific classification
- Kingdom: Plantae
- Clade: Tracheophytes
- Clade: Angiosperms
- Clade: Eudicots
- Order: Proteales
- Family: Proteaceae
- Genus: Banksia
- Species: B. ashbyi

Binomial name
- Banksia ashbyi Baker f.

Subspecies
- B. ashbyi subsp. ashbyi; B. ashbyi subsp. boreoscaia

= Banksia ashbyi =

Ashby's banksia

Species of shrub in native to Western Australia

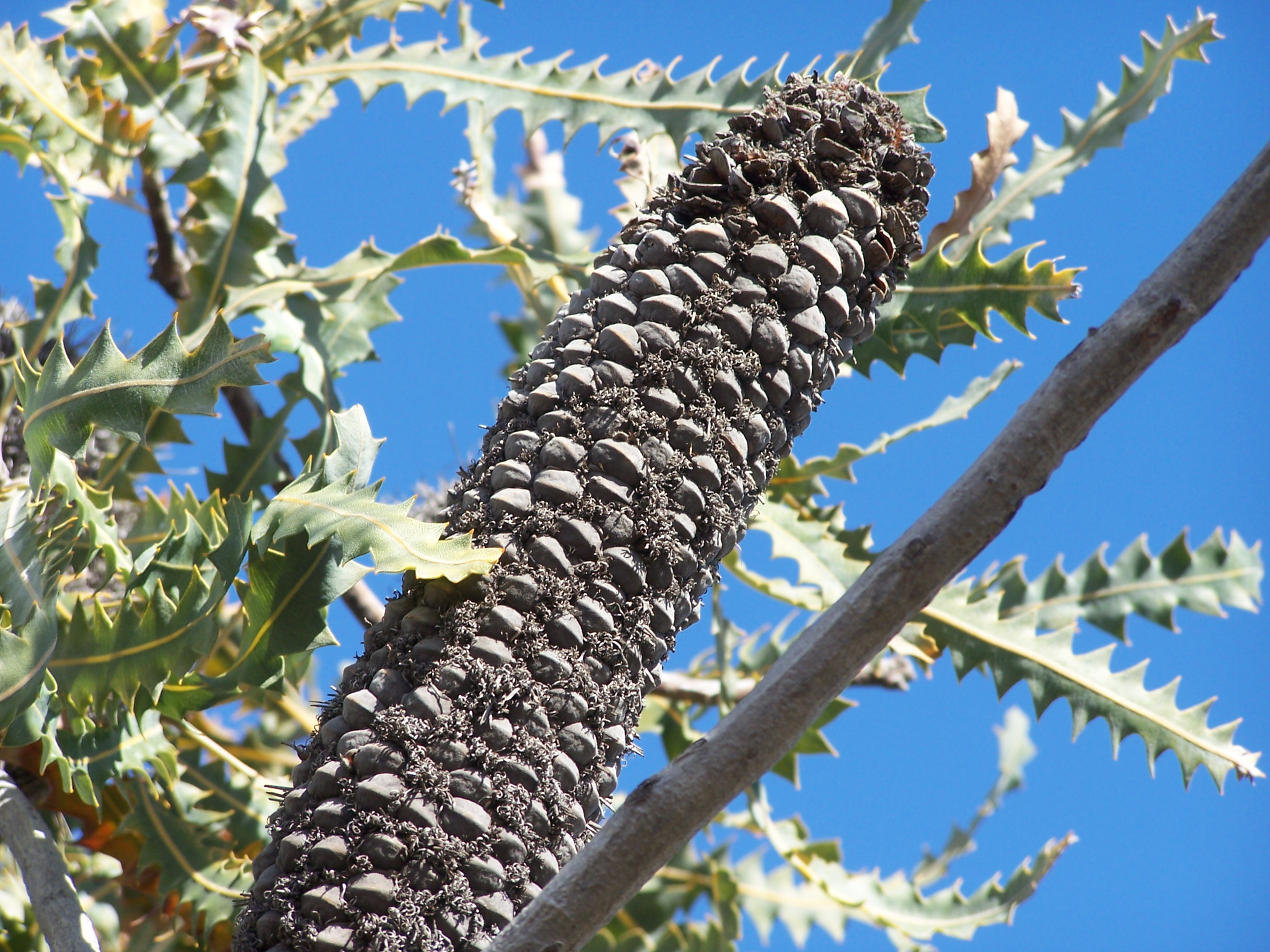
Fruit

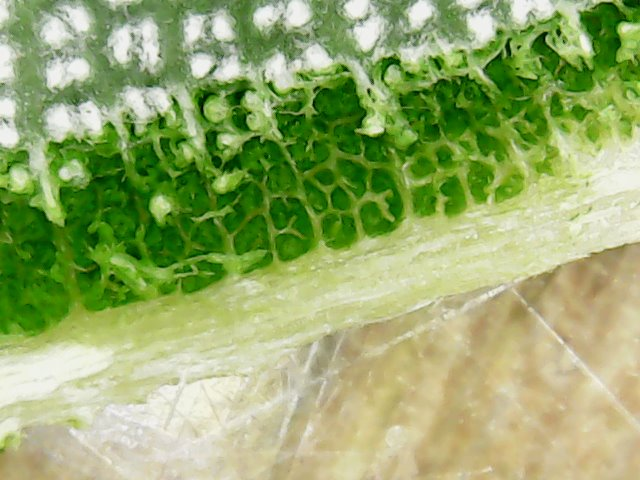
Leaf cell structure

Banksia ashbyi, commonly known as Ashby's banksia, is a species of shrub or small tree that is endemic to Western Australia. It has smooth, grey bark, deeply serrated, hairy leaves and spikes of bright orange flowers.

== Description ==
Banksia ashbyi is a shrub or small tree that typically grows to a height of 8 m (26 ft) and sometimes forms a lignotuber. It has smooth, grey bark and young stems that are hairy at first but become glabrous as they age. The leaves are broadly linear, 100–300 mm (3.9–11.8 in) long and 20–40 mm (0.8–1.6 in) wide and deeply serrated, the serrations triangular with sharply pointed tips. The flower spikes are bright orange, 60–150 mm (2.4–5.9 in) long and 60–80 mm (2.4–3.1 in) in diameter, each perianth 26–34 mm (1.0–1.3 in) long. Flowering occurs from February to May or July to December and the fruits are numerous smooth, elliptical to round follicles 8–15 mm (0.3–0.6 in) long, 3–8 mm (0.1–0.3 in) high and 5–11 mm (0.2–0.4 in) wide with a covering of short, soft hairs.

== Taxonomy and naming ==
Banksia ashbyi was first formally described in 1934 by Edmund Gilbert Baker in the Journal of Botany, British and Foreign. The specific epithet honours Edwin Ashby, one of the collectors of the type specimens.

In 2008, Alex George described two subspecies in the journal Nuytsia and the names have been accepted by the Australian Plant Census:

- Banksia ashbyi subsp. ashbyi grows as a tree up to 7 m (23 ft) in height, lacks a lignotuber and is fire-sensitive;
- Banksia ashbyi subsp. boreoscaia grows as a sprawling shrub no more than 2 m (6 ft 7 in) high and is lignotuberous.

== Distribution and habitat ==
Ashby's banksia grows in heath and spinifex country along the coast of Western Australia between Geraldton and Exmouth. Subspecies ashbyi occurs between Shark Bay and Coorow as well as in the Kennedy Range. Subspecies boreoscaia is found further north, between North West Cape and Quobba.

== Conservation status ==
This banksia is classified as "not threatened" by the Western Australian Government Department of Parks and Wildlife.

== Ecology ==
An assessment of the potential impact of climate change on this species found that its range is unlikely to contract and may actually grow, depending on how effectively it migrates into newly habitable areas.

== Use in horticulture ==
Seeds do not require any treatment, and take 16 to 61 days to germinate.
