= Edmund Gilbert Baker =

British botanist and pharmacist (1864–1949)

- Born: 1864
- Died: 1949 (aged 84–85)
- Occupation: Plant Collector Botanist
- Scientific career
- Author abbrev. (botany): Baker f.

Edmund Gilbert Baker (1864–1949) was a British plant collector and botanist. He was the son of John Gilbert Baker.

== Works ==
- Synopsis of Malveae, 1895
- The plants of Milanji, Nyassa-land. Con James Britten. 1894
- Catalogue of the Plants collected by Mr. & Mrs. P.A. Talbot in the Oban district, South Nigeria. London (impreso por orden de Trustees, British Museum (Natural History)
- Leguminosae of Tropical Africa, part 1, [1]-215, in 1926; part 2, [i-iii], 216-607, Jul 1929; part 3, [i-iii], 608-693, from 1930.

Among species he named are Banksia burdettii and Banksia ashbyi.
