= Robert Royce =

Robert Dunlop Royce (14 March 1914 – 10 July 2008) was an Australian botanist. He was curator of the Western Australian Herbarium from 1960 to 1974.

Born in Perth, Western Australia, he began his botanical career with the Western Australian Department of Agriculture in 1937. He transferred to the Western Australian Herbarium in 1944, and was appointed curator in 1960. One of his main research interests was the application of botany to agriculture, and to this end he undertook substantial research into toxic plants. He published numerous papers on a range of subjects, but does not appear to have described any new taxa. He also oversaw the planning and construction of the current herbarium building. He retired in 1974.

The genus Roycea and the species Eucalyptus roycei (Shark Bay Mallee) were named in his honour.
