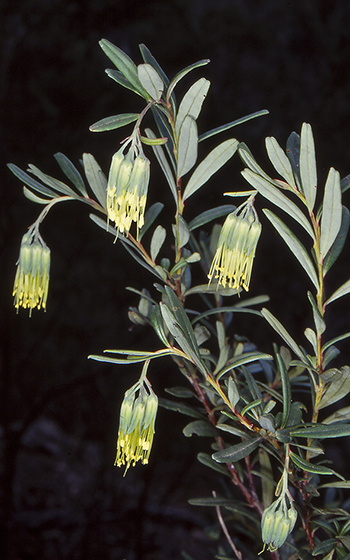

Scientific classification
- Kingdom: Plantae
- Clade: Tracheophytes
- Clade: Angiosperms
- Clade: Eudicots
- Clade: Rosids
- Order: Sapindales
- Family: Rutaceae
- Genus: Leionema
- Species: L. ralstonii

Binomial name
- Leionema ralstonii (F.Muell.) Paul G.Wilson

= Leionema ralstonii =

Species of shrub

Leionema ralstonii, is a small shrub with angular, smooth branchlets and pale green flowers in winter. It is restricted to the south coast of New South Wales.

== Description ==
Leionema ralstonii is a small shrub to about 1 m (3 ft 3 in) high with smooth, substantially angular branchlets. The smooth leaves are sessile, about 30 mm (1.2 in) long, 8 mm (0.31 in) wide, smooth edges rolled under when dry, papery texture, with a slight notch at the rounded apex. The inflorescence is a tight cluster of 4-7 flowers at the end of branches. The smooth leaves are more or less lance shaped, broader at the apex, 2.5–5 cm (0.98–1.97 in) long, 5–8 mm (0.20–0.31 in) wide, gradually narrowing at the base, margins rolled under or upward when dry. The inflorescence is a compact cyme of 4-7 flowers at the end of branches, the stalk bent downwards, individual fleshy flower stalks are about 3 mm (0.12 in) long. The hemispherical calyx is smooth and fleshy with triangular shaped lobes. The flower petals are pale green, about 8 mm (0.31 in) long and stamens more than double the length of the petals. The dry fruit sits upright, 4–5 mm (0.16–0.20 in) long and ending in a short triangular point. Flowering occurs mostly in winter.

== Taxonomy ==
This species was first formally described by Ferdinand von Mueller in 1860 and he gave it the name Eriostemon ralstonii and description was published in Fragmenta Phytographiae Australiae. In 1998 Paul G. Wilson changed the name to Leionema ralstonii and the name change was published in the journal Nuytsia.

== Distribution and habitat ==
Leionema ralstonii is found growing on ridges and creeks in the Bega to Eden district on the south coast of New South Wales.

== Conservation status ==
This species is classified as "vulnerable" by the Government of New South Wales Environment Protection and Biodiversity Conservation Act 1999.
