= Leionema equestre =

Scientific classification
- Kingdom: Plantae
- Clade: Tracheophytes
- Clade: Angiosperms
- Clade: Eudicots
- Clade: Rosids
- Order: Sapindales
- Family: Rutaceae
- Genus: Leionema
- Species: L. equestre

Binomial name
- Leionema equestre (D.A.Cooke) Paul G.Wilson

Species of shrub

Leionema equestre, commonly known as Kangaroo Island phebalium, is a shrub species that is endemic to South Australia. It is a small spreading shrub with rough, green leaves and whitish-pink flowers from late winter to October.

== Description ==
Leionema equestre is a small shrub to 30 cm (12 in) high with wide-spreading green stems becoming reddish, branchlets more or less terete, thin, smooth and covered with minute, soft, upright, star-shaped hairs. The leaves are flat, saddle-shaped, rough, circular, 1–3.5 mm (0.039–0.138 in) long, 2–4 mm (0.079–0.157 in) wide, heart-shaped at the base, smooth margins and edges rolled upward. The flowers are single or in a small cluster of 2 or 3, sessile, each flower on a slender, reddish stem 2–4 mm (0.079–0.157 in) long at the end of branchlets. The calyx lobes are triangular shaped and about 0.3 mm (0.012 in) long. The flower petals spreading, separated, smooth, narrowly elliptic, pink and darkening toward a pointed tip. The 10 stamens are in a two row formation, upright, mostly light yellow or occasionally pink. The flower buds pink, 2.3–3 mm (0.091–0.118 in) long, oval-shaped with a rounded apex. The fruit about 3 mm (0.12 in) long, sparsely covered in short, soft, star-shaped hairs and ending in a small point. Flowering occurs from August to October.

== Taxonomy and naming ==
Kangaroo Island phebalium was first formally described as Phebalium equestre but the genus was changed to Leionema equestre in 1998 by Paul G. Wilson and the description was published in the journal Nuytsia. The specific epithet equestre is derived from Latin meaning belonging to horsemen, in reference to the shape of the leaves.

== Distribution ==
This species has a restricted distribution, only found on Kangaroo Island South Australia.

== Conservation status ==
Leionema equestre is classified as "endangered" by the Government of South Australia Environment Protection and Biodiversity Conservation Act 1999.
