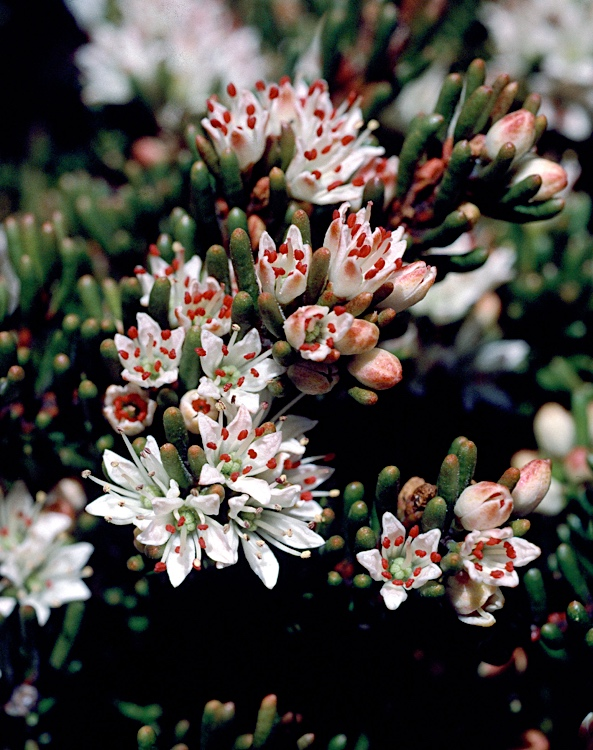
- Wild specimen in Ben Lomond National Park, Tasmania, Australia.

Scientific classification
- Kingdom: Plantae
- Clade: Tracheophytes
- Clade: Angiosperms
- Clade: Eudicots
- Clade: Rosids
- Order: Sapindales
- Family: Rutaceae
- Genus: Leionema
- Species: L. montanum

Binomial name
- Leionema montanum (Hook.) Paul G.Wilson

= Leionema montanum =

Species of shrub

Leionema montanum, is a small shrub with terminal clusters of white-pink flowers in upper leaf axils in spring. It is endemic to Tasmania.

== Description ==
Leionema montanum is a small, compact shrub with terete branchlets that grow horizontally along the ground. In between the old leaf bases are lines of star-shaped soft, erect hairs. The leaves are crowded, needle or club shaped, up to 1 cm (0.39 in) long and rounded. The upper-side more or less flat, the lower surface smooth and rounded. The single flowers are borne in leaf axils at the end of branches, flower petals spreading, about 0.4 mm (0.016 in) long, elliptic, white or pink, smooth and the stamens slightly longer than petals. The pedicel 1.5–3 mm (0.059–0.118 in) long, smooth or with occasional star-shaped soft hairs, fleshy, and enlarged below the sepals. The 2 or 3 bracteoles are near the triangular-shaped calyx lobes, are about 0.7 mm (0.028 in) long, fleshy, smooth and similar in appearance to sepals. The dry fruit are rounded at the apex with a short beak. Flowering occurs from November to January.

== Taxonomy and naming ==
This species was first formally described by W.J.Hooker in 1834 and gave it the name Phebalium montanum. In 1998 Paul G. Wilson changed the name to Leionema montanum and the change was published in the journal Nuytsia. The specific epithet (montanum) is derived from the Latin montanus meaning pertaining to a mountain.

== Distribution and habitat ==
This species grows in mountainous situations in north-eastern Tasmania.
