= Leionema sympetalum =

Scientific classification
- Kingdom: Plantae
- Clade: Tracheophytes
- Clade: Angiosperms
- Clade: Eudicots
- Clade: Rosids
- Order: Sapindales
- Family: Rutaceae
- Genus: Leionema
- Species: L. sympetalum

Binomial name
- Leionema sympetalum (Paul G.Wilson) Paul G.Wilson

Species of shrub

Leionema sympetalum, commonly known as Rylstone bell, is a shrub with greenish-yellow tubular flowers in small terminal clusters at the end of smooth, angular branches. It has a restricted distribution, grows near Rylstone in New South Wales.

== Description ==
Leionema sympetalum is a small shrub to 2–3 m (6 ft 7 in – 9 ft 10 in) high with smooth, angular branches covered with star-shaped to minute, soft, upright hairs when young. The leaves are wedge shaped to elliptic 1.5–3.5 cm (0.59–1.38 in) long, 4–8 mm (0.16–0.31 in) wide, smooth, edges slightly recurved, mostly more or less finely toothed when dry, a prominent midrib on the underside and a blunt apex with a slight notch. The inflorescence is cluster of 1-3 flowers often pendulous at the end of branches, each on a slender, reddish stalk about 7 mm (0.28 in) long. The calyx are hemispherical, smooth, fleshy with wide-triangular lobes about 1 mm (0.039 in) long. The flowers are tubular, 10–15 mm (0.39–0.59 in) long, greenish yellow, petals splitting toward the apex turning upward with triangular tips and the stamens longer than the petals. The fruit are a capsule, each segment about 4 mm (0.16 in) high, ending with a short beak. Flowering occurs from winter to spring.

== Taxonomy ==
Rylstone bell was first formally described by Paul G. Wilson in 1970 and gave it the name Phebalium sympetalum, the description was published in the journal Nuytsia. In 1998 Wilson changed the name to Leionema sympetalum and published the name change in the journal Nuytsia.

== Distribution and habitat ==
This species is confined to the ranges near Rylstone in New South Wales growing in dry sclerophyll forests on rocky outcrops.

== Conservation status ==
This species is classified as "vulnerable" by the Government of New South Wales Environment Protection and Biodiversity Conservation Act 1999.
