= Forest phebalium =

Forest phebalium is a common name for several plants and may refer to:

- Leionema ambiens
- Phebalium squamulosum, endemic to Eastern Australia
