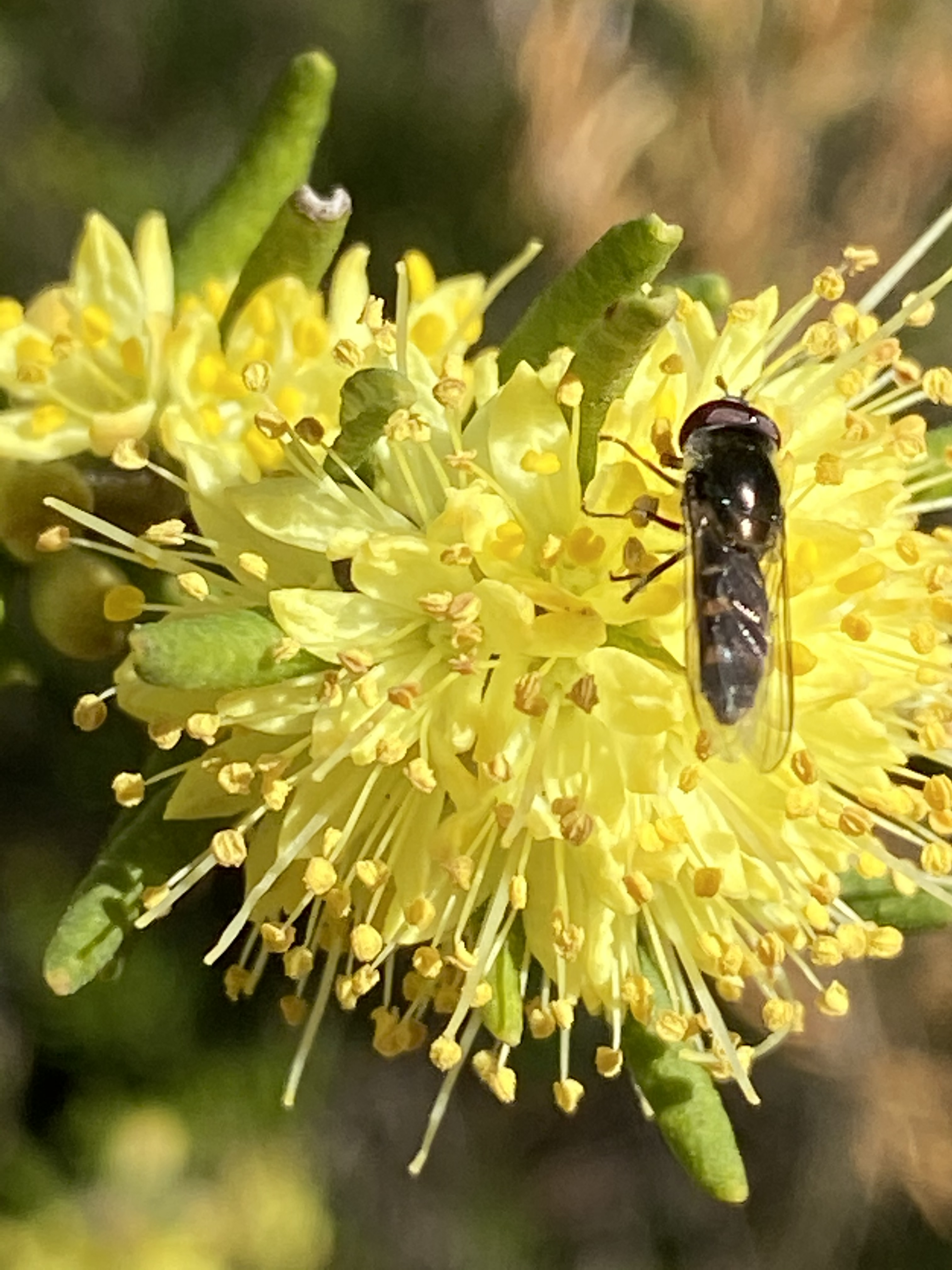

Scientific classification
- Kingdom: Plantae
- Clade: Tracheophytes
- Clade: Angiosperms
- Clade: Eudicots
- Clade: Rosids
- Order: Sapindales
- Family: Rutaceae
- Genus: Leionema
- Species: L. phylicifolium

Binomial name
- Leionema phylicifolium (F.Muell.) Paul G.Wilson

Synonyms
- Phebalium phylicifolium F.Muell; Eriostemon phylicifolius (F.Muell.) F.Muell.

= Leionema phylicifolium =

Alpine phebalium

Species of shrub

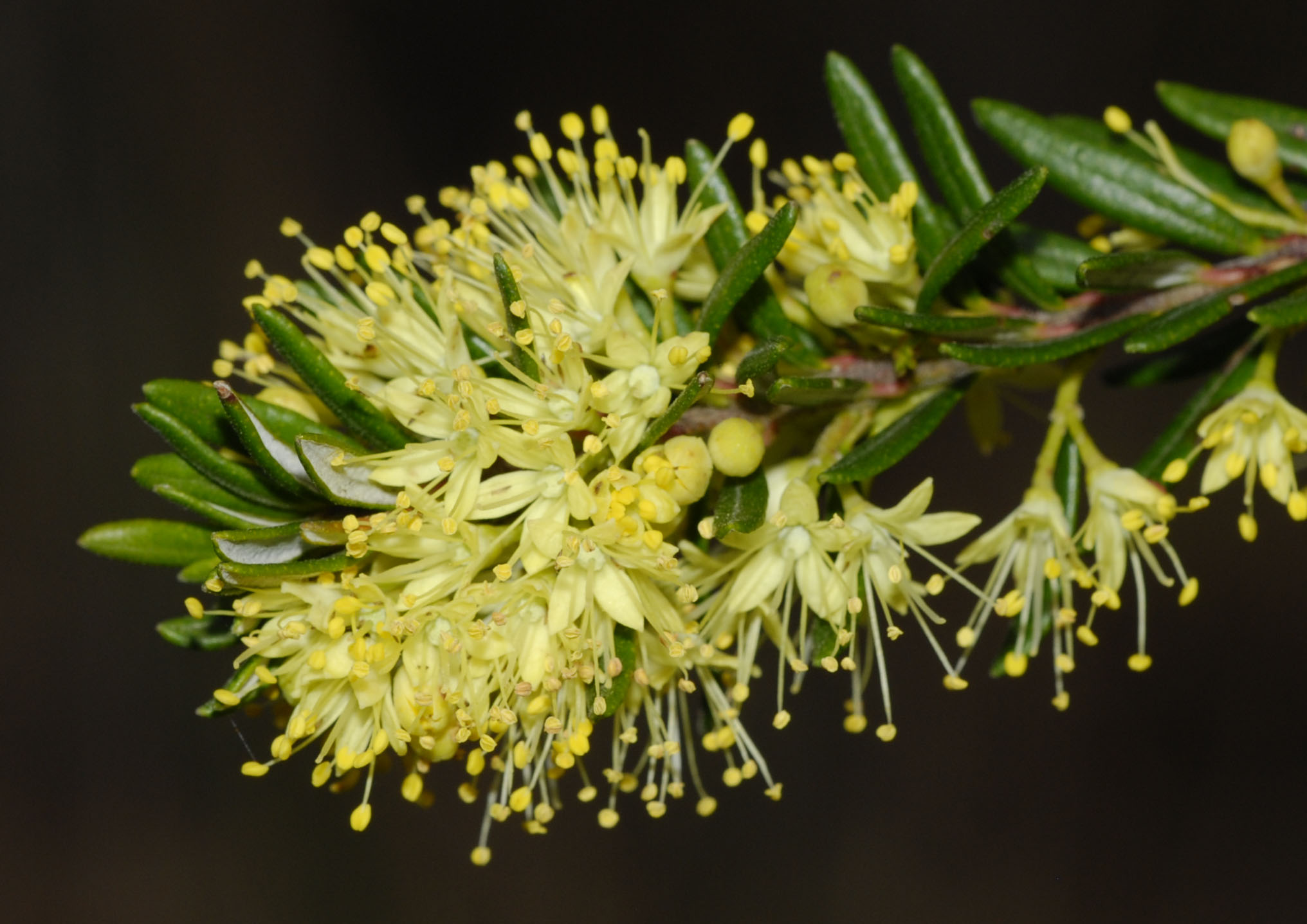
Flowers

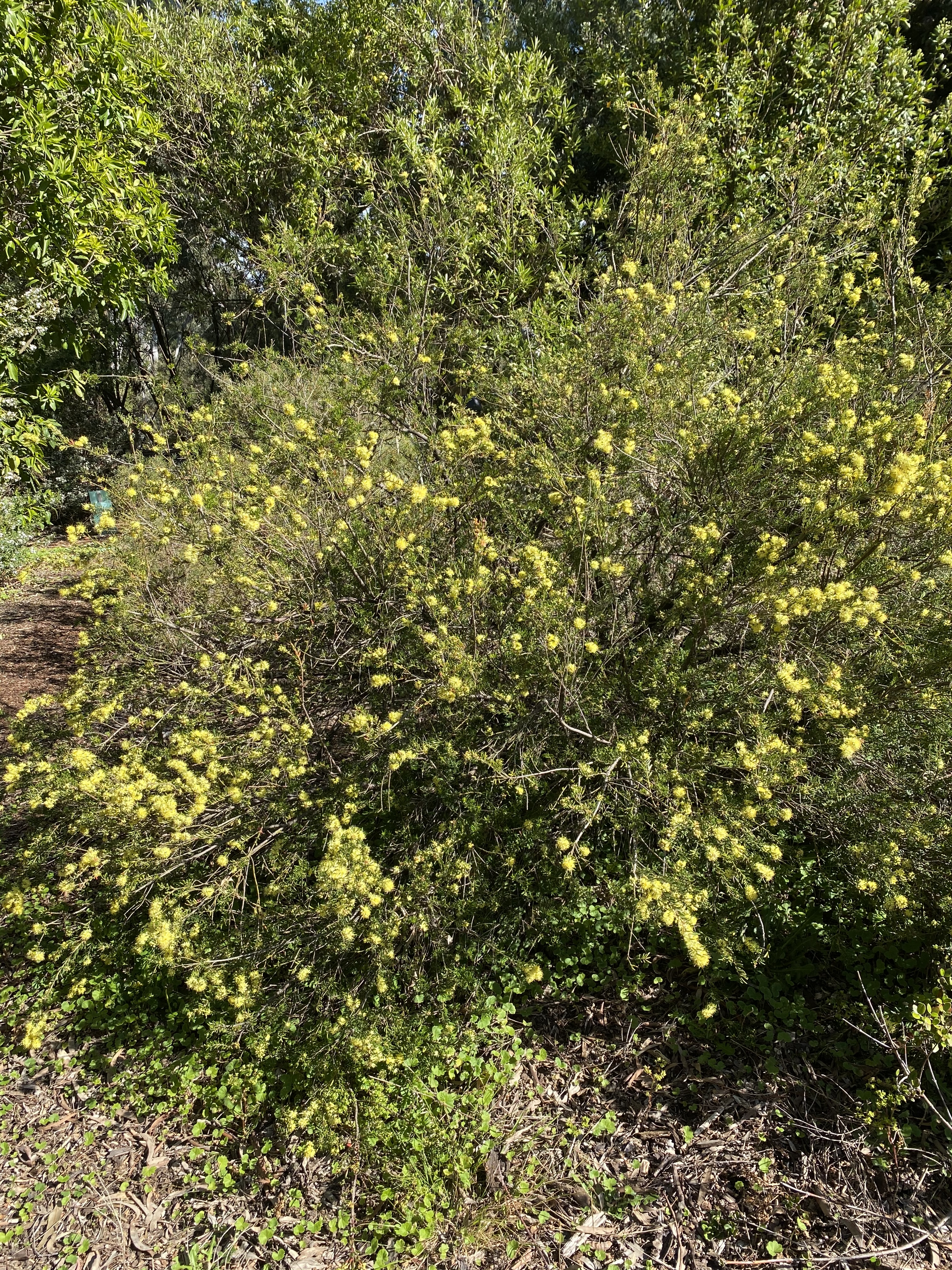
Habit

Leionema phylicifolium, commonly known as alpine phebalium, is a shrub that is endemic to south-eastern Australia. It is a small shrub with green, smooth, leathery leaves and pale yellow flowers in spring.

== Description ==
Leionema phylicifolium is a compact shrub to 1.5 m (4 ft 11 in) high, branchlets are more or less needle-shaped with star to upright shaped soft hairs. The leathery, smooth leaves are oblong to elliptic shaped or narrow with recurved edges, 8–17 mm (0.31–0.67 in) long, 1.5–2.5 mm (0.059–0.098 in) wide and smooth margins. The inflorescence is a cluster of mostly 3-4 flowers in a cylindrical arrangement at the end of branches on a small stalk or a peduncle to 4 mm (0.16 in) long in leaf axils. The flower cluster is on a more or less fleshy, smooth pedicel 1–3 mm (0.039–0.118 in) long and has tiny egg-shaped bracts. The smooth calyx lobes are triangular shaped, 0.5 mm (0.020 in) and smooth. The petals are narrowly elliptic, spreading, 3.5–4 mm (0.14–0.16 in) long and pale yellow and stamens marginally longer than petals. The dry fruit has occasional hairs, rounded at the apex, about 3 mm (0.12 in) long and a very small beak.

== Taxonomy ==
The species was first formally described by Victorian Government Botanist Ferdinand von Mueller who had observed the species "on the highest peaks of the Cobboras Mountains, and on the sources of the Mitta Mitta." Mueller named it Phebalium phylicifolium and the description was published in Transactions and Proceedings of the Victorian Institute for the Advancement of Science. In 1998 Paul G. Wilson changed the name to Leionema phylicifolium and the name change was published in the journal Nuytsia.

== Distribution and habitat ==
Alpine phebalium is found growing at higher altitudes in eastern Victoria in scrubland, eucalypt woodland and heath, mostly in wetter locations. It also occurs in New South Wales in the extreme south-east of the state in the Kosciuszko National Park and south from the upper Tuross River in dry sclerophyll forest and heath.
