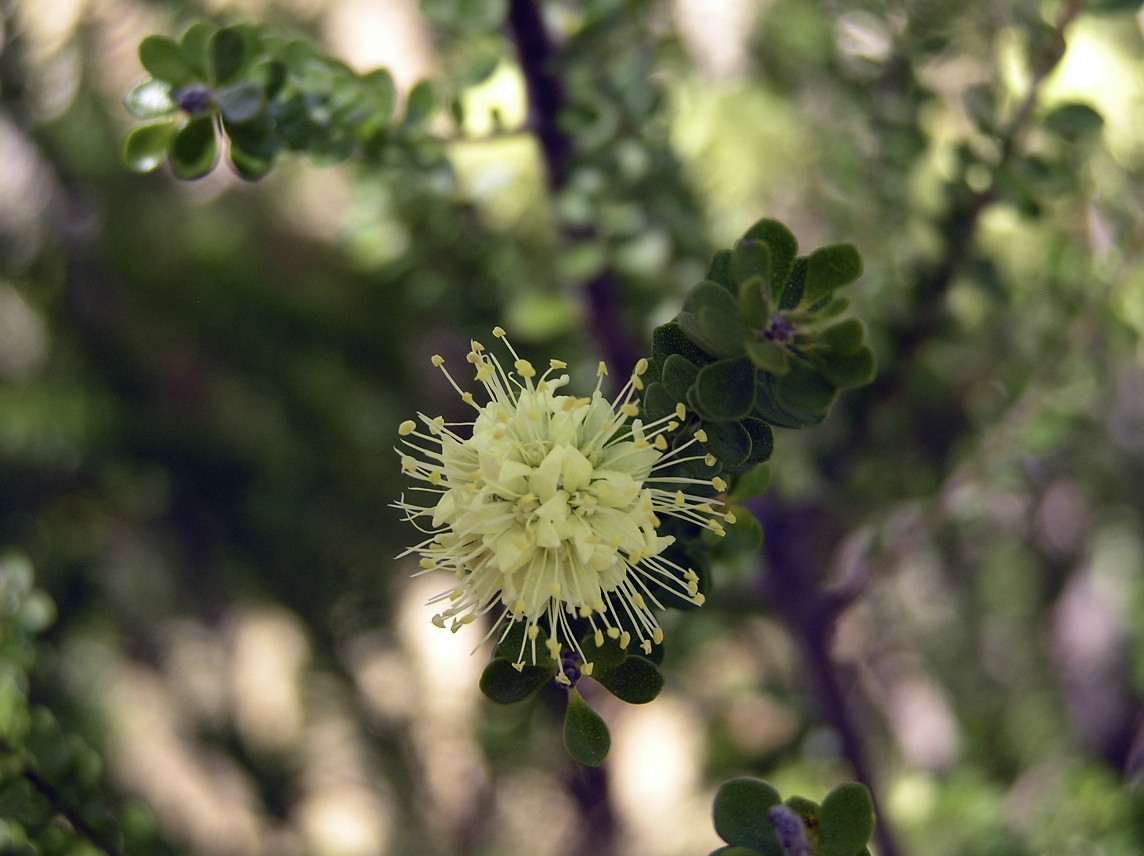

Scientific classification
- Kingdom: Plantae
- Clade: Tracheophytes
- Clade: Angiosperms
- Clade: Eudicots
- Clade: Rosids
- Order: Sapindales
- Family: Rutaceae
- Genus: Leionema
- Species: L. rotundifolium

Binomial name
- Leionema rotundifolium (A.Cunn. ex Endl.) Paul G.Wilson

= Leionema rotundifolium =

Species of shrub

Leionema rotundifolium, is a dense shrub with needle-shaped stems and pale lemon to white terminal flowers. It is found in New South Wales and Queensland.

== Description ==
Leionema rotundifolium is a bushy, thick shrub to 2 m (6 ft 7 in) high with terete stems and finely covered in star-shaped hairs. The smooth leaves are flat, leathery and more or less in an overlapping formation along the stems, broadly egg-shaped to almost circular, 0.6–1 cm (0.24–0.39 in) long, 4–6 mm (0.16–0.24 in) wide, edges smooth or minutely irregular near the rounded apex. The inflorescence is a rounded cluster of flowers on a short stem in the uppermost leaves or bracts. The calyx is shaped like an inverted cone, smooth and broadly triangular shaped. The white to lemon petals are 4–6 mm (0.16–0.24 in) long and dotted with glands. The dry, spreading fruit is 4–6 mm (0.16–0.24 in) long with a short beak. Flowering occurs from late winter to spring.

== Taxonomy ==
This species was first formally described by Allan Cunningham and he gave it the name Eriostemon rotundifolius but did not publish the description. In 1837 Stephen Endlicher published Cunninghams description. In 1998 Paul G. Wilson changed the name to Leionema rotundifolium and published the description in Nuytsia.

== Distribution and habitat ==
Leionema rotundifolium is found growing in the Torrington and Howell districts of north-eastern New South Wales and near Glen Aplin area of south-east Queensland on granite outcrops.
