= Leionema hillebrandii =

Scientific classification
- Kingdom: Plantae
- Clade: Tracheophytes
- Clade: Angiosperms
- Clade: Eudicots
- Clade: Rosids
- Order: Sapindales
- Family: Rutaceae
- Genus: Leionema
- Species: L. hillebrandii

Binomial name
- Leionema hillebrandii (J.H.Willis) Paul G.Wilson

Species of shrub

Leionema hillebrandii, commonly known as Mount Lofty phebalium, is a perennial, woody shrub endemic to South Australia. It has variable shaped leaves and pinkish flowers from late winter to spring.

== Description ==
Leionema hillebrandii is a small straggly, perennial shrub to 30–60 cm (12–24 in) high with smooth greenish-brown to red, thin, terete branchlets sparsely covered with star shaped hairs. The edges of the leaves are rolled under, dark green, silky, heart shaped to wedge-shaped, narrowing at the base or egg-shaped to wedge-shaped or oblong, 5–17 mm (5.0–17.0 mm) long, 2–2.5 mm (0.079–0.098 in) wide with smooth margins. The leaves may be squared with a point or rounded at the apex or acute with two lobes, rounded with a shallow notch, papery, smooth texture or rough with short hard protrusions on the upper surface. The inflorescence is cluster of up to 16 pinkish flowers on a thin pedicel 4–10 mm (0.16–0.39 in) long. The calyx lobes triangular shaped, about 0.5 mm (0.020 in) high and occasional star-shaped hairs. The petals are smooth, spreading, narrowly oval-shaped, 3.5–5 mm (0.14–0.20 in) long and pink toward the tip. The stamens are more or less equal in length to the petals and the anthers pink. The fruit is a light brown, 2-4 segmented egg-shaped capsule, 4 mm (0.16 in) long, rounded at the apex with a beak. Flowering occurs from August to October.

== Taxonomy and naming ==
Mount Lofty phebalium was described in 1957 as Phebalium hillebrandii by J.H Willis, but the name was changed to Leionema hillebrandii in 1998 by Paul G. Wilson and the description was published in the journal Nuytsia. The specific epithet (hillebrandii) was named in honour of Dr. Wilhelm Hillebrand a friend of Baron von Mueller.

== Distribution and habitat ==
This species is found along rocky waterways from Mount Lofty to Tanunda in South Australia.
