= Leionema lachnaeoides =

Scientific classification
- Kingdom: Plantae
- Clade: Tracheophytes
- Clade: Angiosperms
- Clade: Eudicots
- Clade: Rosids
- Order: Sapindales
- Family: Rutaceae
- Genus: Leionema
- Species: L. lachnaeoides

Binomial name
- Leionema lachnaeoides (A.Cunn.) Paul G.Wilson

Species of shrub

Leionema lachnaeoides, is a tall shrub with aromatic leaves and yellow flowers from winter to late spring. It is restricted to the Blue Mountains in New South Wales.

== Description ==
Leionema lachnaeoides is a tall shrub to 2 m (6 ft 7 in) high with white stems covered in fine, smooth, silver star-shaped hairs quickly becoming smooth. The leaves are more or less terete, 0.8 mm (0.031 in) long, 1 mm (0.039 in) wide, arranged alternately along the branches on a flattened petiole, with a slight upward curve and ending in a point. The leaf upper and lower side and edges are smooth, surface leathery, margins rolled under almost obscuring the paler underside. The flowers are borne singly on a short peduncle about 1.5 mm (0.059 in) long in upper leaf axils and covered in soft star-shaped hairs. The pedicel is fleshy and about 2 mm (0.079 in) long with 4 tiny bracts at the base. The green calyx lobes are triangular-shaped, about 0.5 mm (0.020 in) long and smooth. The spreading, five yellow flower petals are narrowly oval shaped, about 5 mm (0.20 in) long, smooth and dotted with glands. The 5 prominent, yellow stamens only slightly longer than the petals. The dry fruit are rounded with a distinctive 2–3 mm (0.079–0.118 in) long beak and the seed is dispersed on maturity in early summer. Flowering occurs between winter and late spring.

== Taxonomy and naming ==
This species was described in 1825 by Allan Cunningham, but the name was changed to Leionema lachnaeoides in 1998 by Paul G. Wilson and the description was published in the journal Nuytsia. The specific epithet (lachnaeoides) is from the Greek lachne- meaning "soft wool" and -oides meaning "resembling" a reference to the hairiness of the species.

== Distribution and habitat ==
Leionema lachnaeoides grows on rocky outcrops, among heath and scrubland west of Katoomba in the Blue Mountain and from Shipley Plateau, Blackheath.

== Conservation status ==
This species is classified as "endangered" under the Environment Protection and Biodiversity Conservation Act 1999 due to factors including weed invasion, altered drainage and fire regimes.
