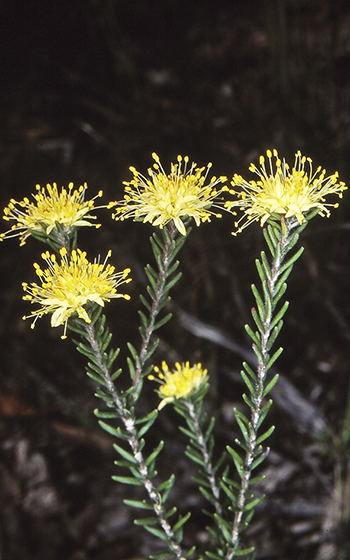

Scientific classification
- Kingdom: Plantae
- Clade: Tracheophytes
- Clade: Angiosperms
- Clade: Eudicots
- Clade: Rosids
- Order: Sapindales
- Family: Rutaceae
- Genus: Leionema
- Species: L. diosmeum

Binomial name
- Leionema diosmeum (Juss.) Paul G.Wilson

= Leionema diosmeum =

Species of shrub

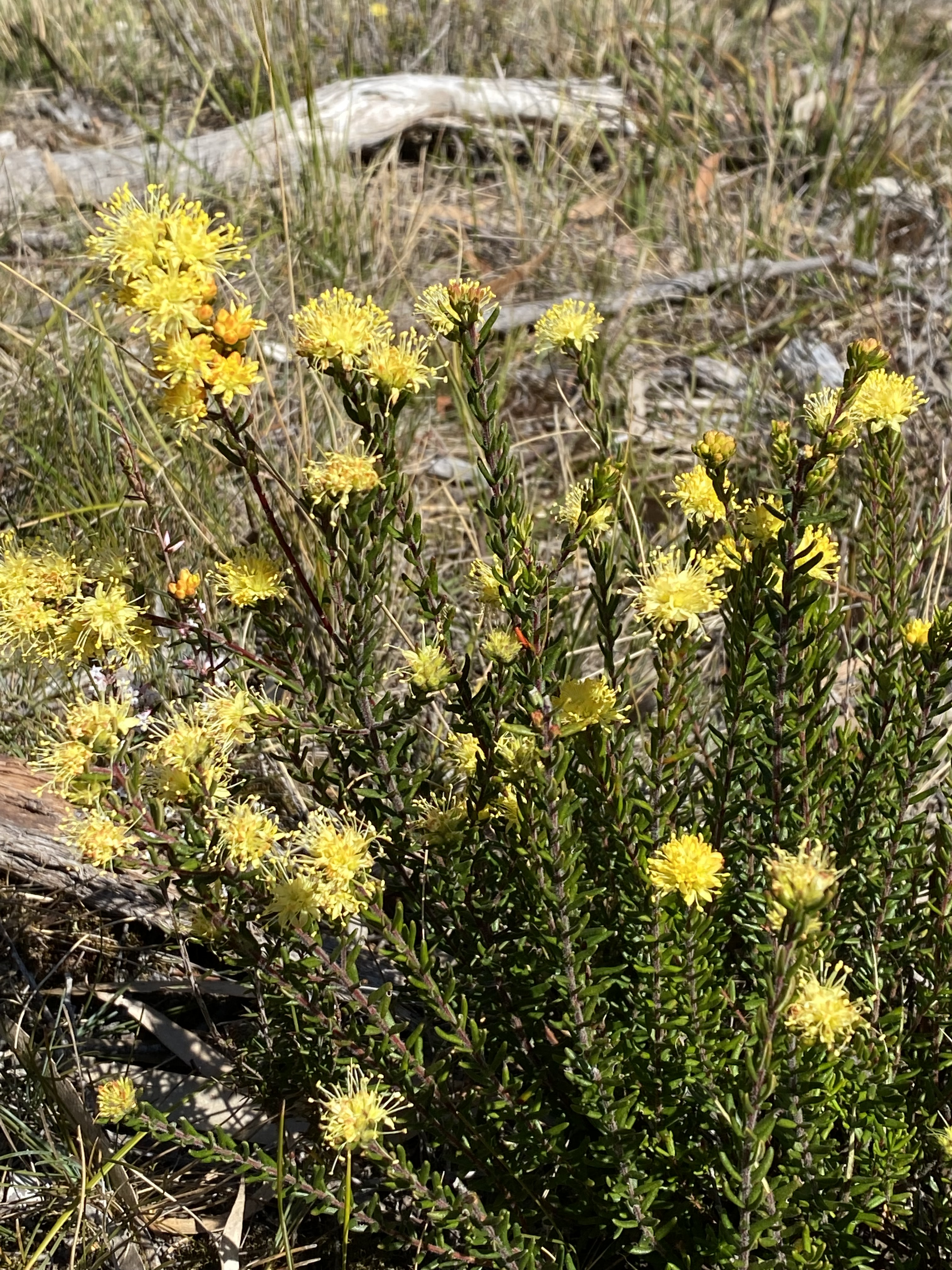
Habit

Leionema diosmeum is a shrub species in the family Rutaceae that is endemic to southern New South Wales, Australia. It has an upright habit, stems with fine soft hairs, variable shaped leaves and yellow flowers from late winter to spring.

== Description ==
Leionema diosmeum is a shrub to 2 m (6 ft 7 in) high with smooth branches, leaves usually needle-shaped or occasionally oval to lance shaped,0.4–2 cm (0.16–0.79 in) long, 1–4 mm (0.039–0.157 in) wide, rounded apex, upper surface smooth or covered in soft thin individual hairs or rarely fine rough hairs, lower surface with coarse star-shaped hairs. The inflorescence is a compact head at the end of branches, each flower in axils of linear bracts about 5 mm (0.20 in) long on a thick pedicel 1–2 mm (0.039–0.079 in) long, calyx is an inverted top shape and deeply lobed. The flower petals a creamish-yellow, light red on the outside toward apex, 4–7 mm (0.16–0.28 in) long with occasional hairs tipped with glands. The fruit are upright, about 4 mm (0.16 in) long with an angled beak. Bears clusters of yellow flowers in spring.

== Taxonomy ==
Leionema diosmeum was first formally described by Paul G. Wilson and the description was published in Nuytsia.

== Distribution and habitat ==
This species grows on sandstone in dry sclerophyll forest and heath south of the Royal National Park in New South Wales.
