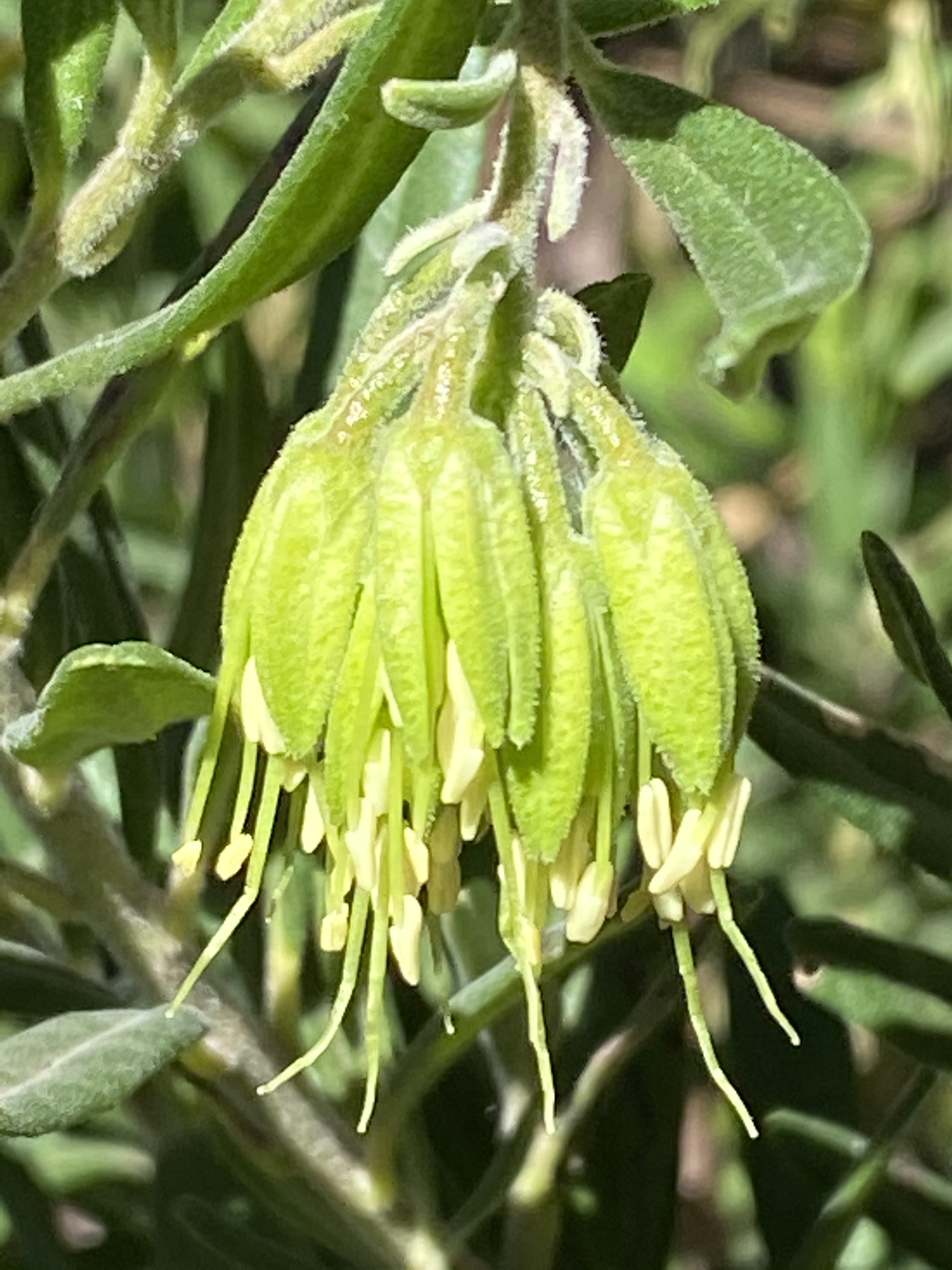
- Growing in the Warrumbungles National Park

Scientific classification
- Kingdom: Plantae
- Clade: Tracheophytes
- Clade: Angiosperms
- Clade: Eudicots
- Clade: Rosids
- Order: Sapindales
- Family: Rutaceae
- Genus: Leionema
- Species: L. viridiflorum

Binomial name
- Leionema viridiflorum (Paul G.Wilson) Paul G.Wilson

= Leionema viridiflorum =

Species of shrub

Leionema viridiflorum commonly known as green phebalium, is a species of flowering plant in the family Rutaceae. It is a small shrub with pale yellow-greenish flowers in clusters at the end of branches from winter to early spring. It has a restricted distribution in northern New South Wales.

== Description ==
Leionema viridiflorum is usually a small shrub to 1 m (3 ft 3 in) high with more or less needle-shaped stems covered in star-shaped, short, matted hairs. The leaves are mostly erect, narrowly oblong to oblong-elliptic, 20–40 mm (0.79–1.57 in) long, 4–8 mm (0.16–0.31 in) wide, wedge shaped at the base, apex lobed, smooth margins, rolled under or upward when dry, upper surface dotted with glands with occasional smooth to star-shaped hairs, underside more or less covered in star-shaped hairs. The inflorescence is a cluster of 6-12 pendulous flowers on a stalk 4–8 mm (0.16–0.31 in) long at the end of branches. The calyx are fleshy and hemispherical shaped. The erect, pale yellow-greenish petals are lance to narrowly oblong shaped, about 10 mm (0.39 in) long with occasional star-shaped, soft, erect hairs and the stamens twice the length of the petals. The fruit are a capsule, each segment about 6 mm (0.24 in) high, ending with a short beak. Flowering occurs from winter to early spring.

== Taxonomy and naming ==
This species was first formally described by Paul Wilson in 1970 and gave it the name Phebalium viridiflorum and the description was published in the journal Nuytsia. In 1998 Paul Wilson changed the name to Leionema viridiflorum and published the name change in the journal Nuytsia. The specific epithet (viridiflorum) means "green flowers".

== Distribution and habitat ==
Leionema viridiflorum grows usually in heath on trachyte outcrops in the Warrumbungle National Park and Mount Kaputar National Park in New South Wales.
