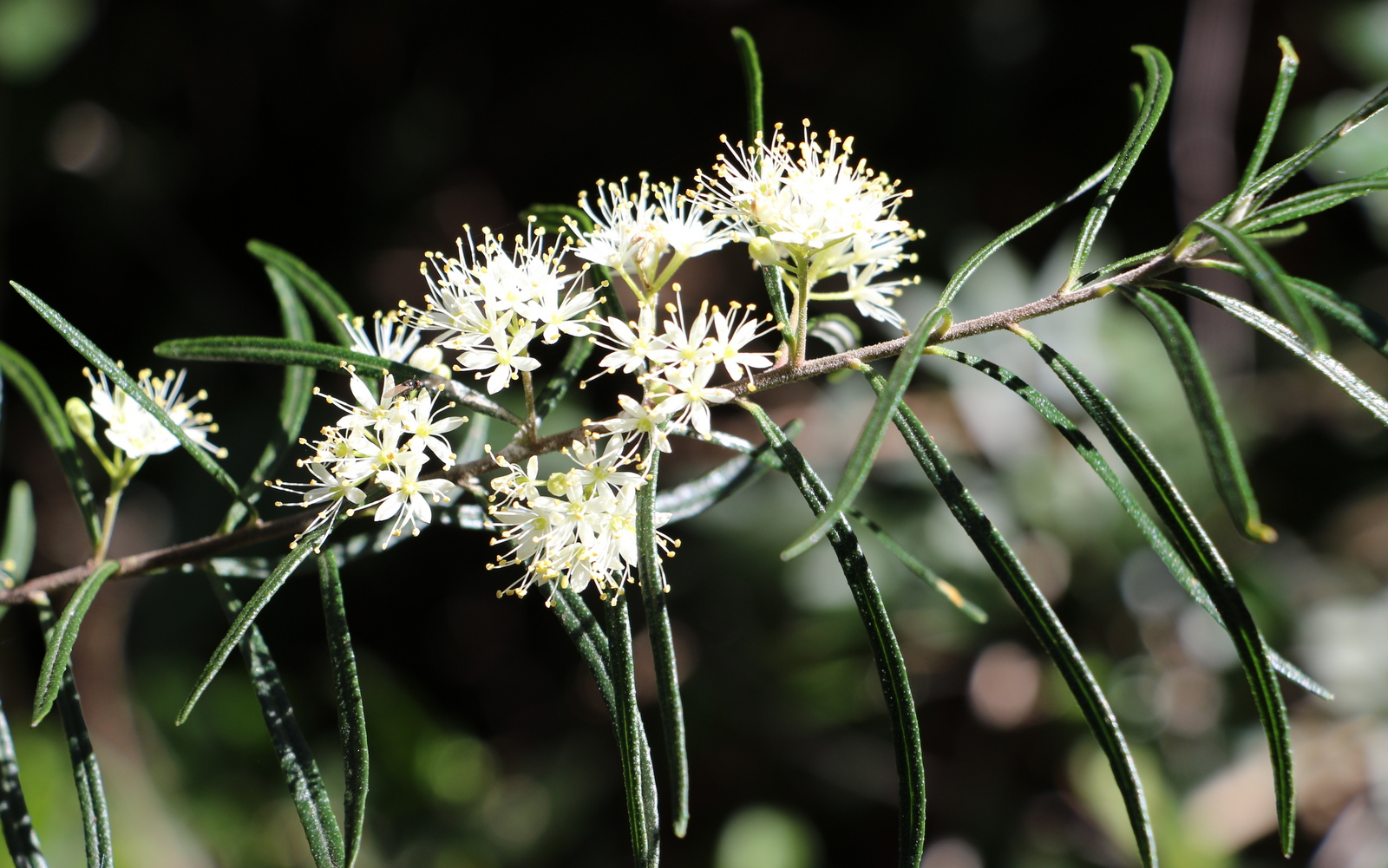
- Castlecrag, Australia

Scientific classification
- Kingdom: Plantae
- Clade: Tracheophytes
- Clade: Angiosperms
- Clade: Eudicots
- Clade: Rosids
- Order: Sapindales
- Family: Rutaceae
- Genus: Leionema
- Species: L. dentatum

Binomial name
- Leionema dentatum (Sm.) Paul G.Wilson

Synonyms
- Phebalium dentatum Sm.; Phebalium salicifolium A.Juss.; Eriostemon umbellatus Turcz.; Phebalium umbellatum (Turcz.)Turcz.

= Leionema dentatum =

Toothed phebalium

Species of shrub

Leionema dentatum, commonly known as toothed phebalium is a species of large shrub or small tree that is endemic to New South Wales, Australia. It has variable leaves, slender branches and clusters of cream-yellow flowers in spring.

== Description ==
Leionema dentatum is a shrub or small tree to 6 m (20 ft) high with slender more or less needle-shaped stems. The leaves are variable and may be narrowly oblong or elliptic, lance shaped or linear, 4–8 cm (1.6–3.1 in) long, 1–8 mm (0.039–0.315 in) wide, smooth, apex squared or blunt with two teeth, margins rolled under or upward more or less toothed, underside white with star shaped hairs and a raised midrib. The inflorescence consists of about 10 flowers on an angled peduncle 2–8 mm (0.079–0.315 in) long, individual flowers on a slender pedicel about 4 mm (0.16 in) long. The calyx lobes are a wide-triangular shape and fleshy. The light yellow to white petals about 3.5 mm (0.14 in) long, smooth and dotted with glands. The fruit sit upright on the stem are about 3.5 mm (0.14 in) long and end in a small distinct point.

== Taxonomy and naming ==
Leionema dentatum was first formally described in 1998 by Paul G. Wilson and the description was published in Nuytsia. The specific epithet (dentatum) is a Latin word meaning "toothed".

== Distribution and habitat ==
This species grows mostly from Gibraltar Range National Park to the Illawarra region in southern New South Wales on sandstone in dry sclerophyll forests.
