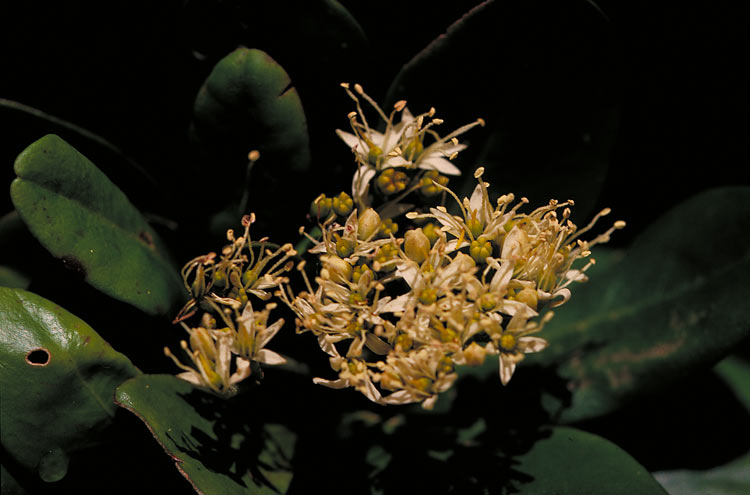

Scientific classification
- Kingdom: Plantae
- Clade: Tracheophytes
- Clade: Angiosperms
- Clade: Eudicots
- Clade: Rosids
- Order: Sapindales
- Family: Rutaceae
- Genus: Leionema
- Species: L. ellipticum

Binomial name
- Leionema ellipticum Paul G.Wilson

= Leionema ellipticum =

Species of shrub

Leionema ellipticum is a shrub species that is endemic to Queensland in Australia. It is a small shrub with smooth green leaves and creamy-white flowers in spring.

== Description ==
Leionema ellipticum is a small shrub to 2 m (6 ft 7 in) high with smooth, glossy, more or less terete branchlets. The leaves are elliptic, tapering at the base, about 5 cm (2.0 in) long, 2 cm (0.79 in) wide, smooth, papery and rounded at the apex. The inflorescence is a clusters of flowers, each flower about 2 cm (0.79 in) long on a pedicel 1–2 mm (0.039–0.079 in) long and sporadically covered with minute, upright soft hairs. The sepals are shortly attached to the base of the flower, fleshy, triangular shaped, about 0.8 mm (0.031 in) long and bracteoles falling off early. The white petals are about 4.5 mm (0.18 in) long, narrow oval shape, smooth and prominently keeled. Flowering occurs from December to January.

== Taxonomy and naming ==
Leionema ellipticum was first formally described by Paul G. Wilson in 1998 and the description was published in the Nuytsia. The specific epithet (ellipticum) is derived from the Latin elipticus referring to the shape of the leaves.

== Distribution and habitat ==
This species has a restricted distribution found growing at a windy, mountainous location in north-east Queensland.
