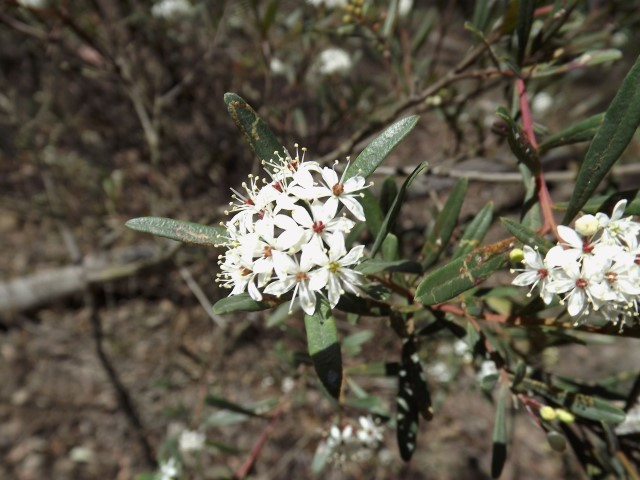

Scientific classification
- Kingdom: Plantae
- Clade: Tracheophytes
- Clade: Angiosperms
- Clade: Eudicots
- Clade: Rosids
- Order: Sapindales
- Family: Rutaceae
- Genus: Leionema
- Species: L. obtusifolium

Binomial name
- Leionema obtusifolium (Paul G.Wilson) Paul G.Wilson

= Leionema obtusifolium =

Species of shrub

Leionema obtusifolium, is a small shrub with yellow-white flowers in terminal clusters at the end of branches. It is endemic to Queensland.

== Description ==
Leionema obtusifolium is a small shrub to 1 m (3 ft 3 in) high with a smooth, shiny appearance. The branchlets are flattened with noticeable acute angles and a finely warty surface. The sessile leaves are smooth, papery, narrowly elliptic or with straight sides and rounded apex to spoon-shaped, 25–50 mm (0.98–1.97 in) long, 3–6 mm (0.12–0.24 in) wide, minutely scalloped near the apex that is rounded to blunt. The flowers are a cyme formation of 10-20 flowers at the end of branches on slender stalks 4–8 mm (0.16–0.31 in) long. The sepals are hemispherical shaped, 0.5 mm (0.020 in) long and the lobes 0.25 mm (0.0098 in) long. The yellowish white spreading petals are narrowly egg-shaped, about 4 mm (0.16 in) long and the stamens more or less equal in length of the petals. Flowering occurs in spring.

== Taxonomy ==
This species was first formally described in 1970 by Paul G. Wilson and gave it the name Phebalium obtusifolium. In 1998 Paul G. Wilson changed the name to Leionema obtusifolium and the name change was published in the journal Nuytsia.

== Distribution and habitat ==
This species has a restricted distribution, growing on sandstone hills in the Helidon and Ravensbourne areas of south-eastern Queensland.

== Conservation status ==
Leionema obtusifolium is classified as "vulnerable" by the Government of Queensland Environment Protection and Biodiversity Conservation Act 1999.
