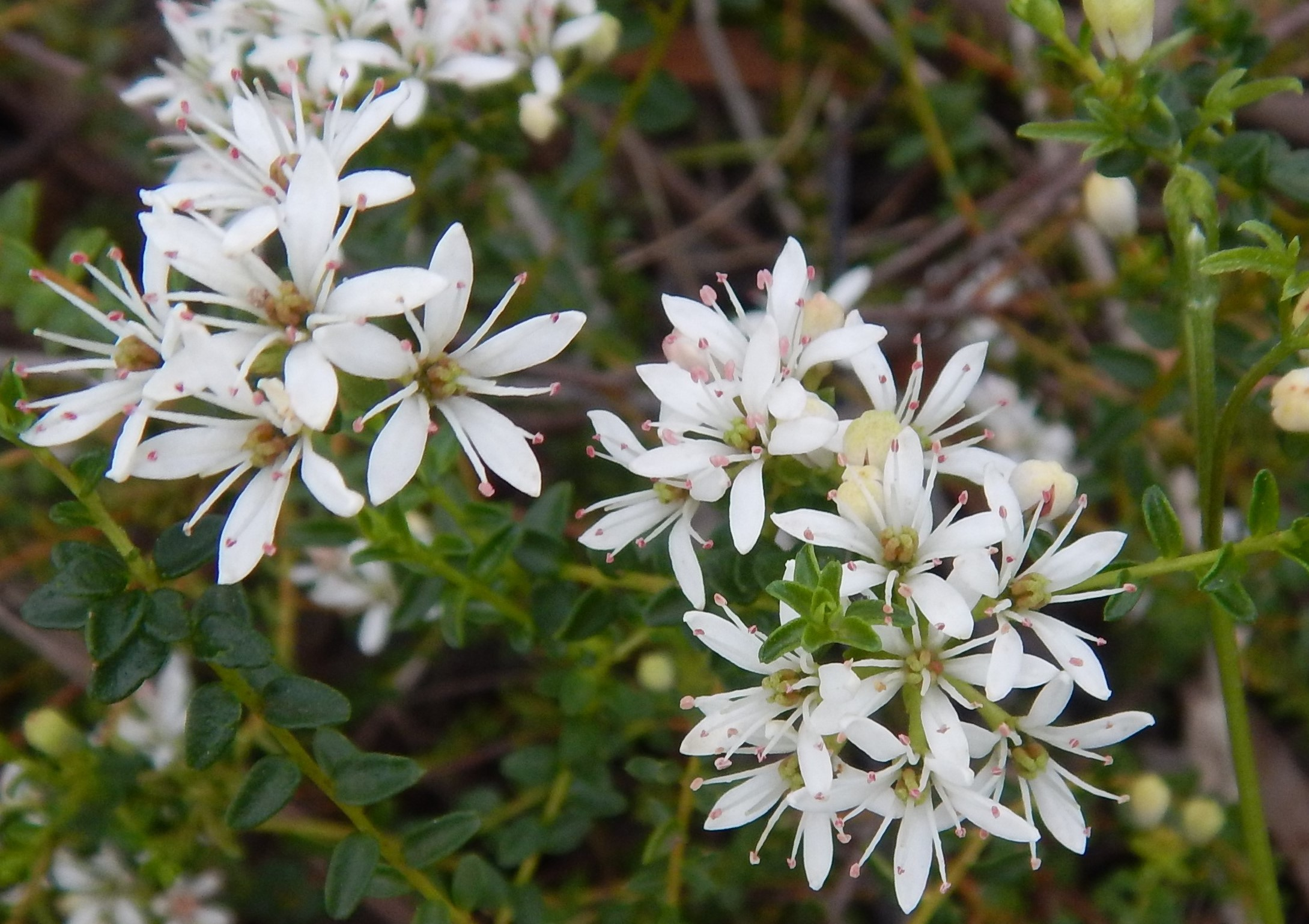

Scientific classification
- Kingdom: Plantae
- Clade: Tracheophytes
- Clade: Angiosperms
- Clade: Eudicots
- Clade: Rosids
- Order: Sapindales
- Family: Rutaceae
- Genus: Leionema
- Species: L. microphyllum

Binomial name
- Leionema microphyllum (F.Muell.) Paul G.Wilson

= Leionema microphyllum =

Limestone phebalium

Species of shrub

Leionema microphyllum, commonly known as limestone phebalium, is a small shrub with terminal clusters of white-pink flowers in spring. It is a rare plant in Victoria and South Australia.

== Description ==
Leionema microphyllum is a small shrub to 40 cm (16 in) high with terete branchlets that are covered with tiny star-shaped hairs or sometimes smooth. The stiff, leathery leaves are egg-shaped to broader egg-shaped, 3–5 mm (0.12–0.20 in) long, 2–4 mm (0.079–0.157 in) wide with an apex almost heart-shaped or pointed to rounded, occasionally smooth or with minute star-shaped hairs with flat, smooth margins. The inflorescence is a cluster of 1-4 flowers at the end of branches in upper leaf axils. The white to pink petals are narrowly egg-shaped, about 4 mm (0.16 in) long and smooth, stamens almost length of the petals. The pedicels are 2–4 mm (0.079–0.157 in) long, fleshy, triangular-shaped lobes are about 0.5 mm (0.020 in) long and smooth. The dry fruit are smooth, about 4 mm (0.16 in) high and the surface finely corrugated with a rounded apex. Flowering occurs in spring.

== Taxonomy and naming ==
This species was first formally described in 1855 by Ferdinand von Mueller and gave it the name Eriostemon microphyllus. In 1998 Paul G. Wilson changed the name to Leionema microphyllum and the name change was published in the journal Nuytsia. The specific epithet (microphyllum) is from the Greek microphyllus, micro- meaning "small" and -phyllus meaning "leaved".

== Distribution and habitat ==
This species has a restricted distribution in Victoria growing in heathland in the Natimuk district, but unknown in the area since 1962, and found near Lake Hindmarsh in 2014. In South Australia it is found in the southern Eyre Peninsula district.
