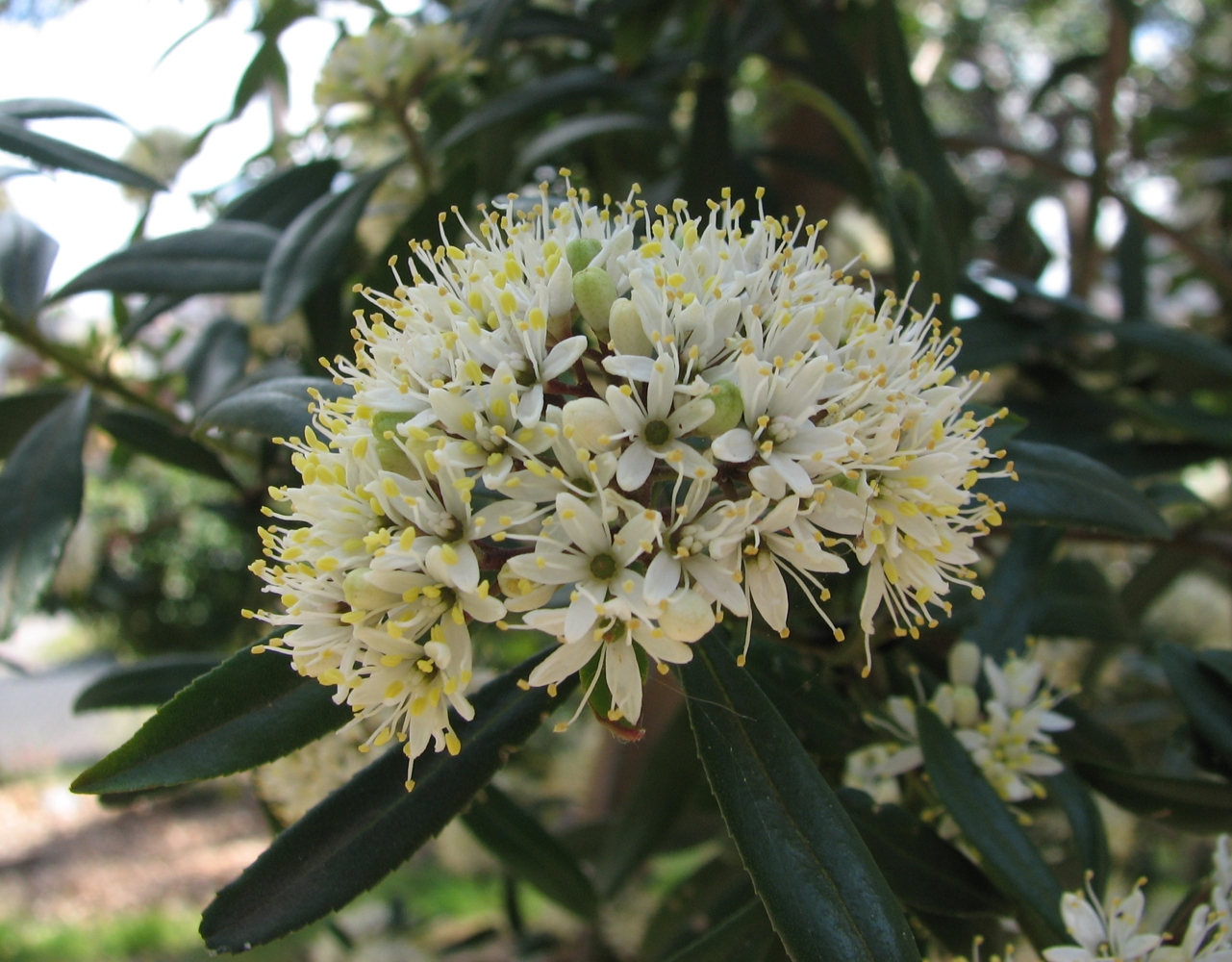

Scientific classification
- Kingdom: Plantae
- Clade: Tracheophytes
- Clade: Angiosperms
- Clade: Eudicots
- Clade: Rosids
- Order: Sapindales
- Family: Rutaceae
- Genus: Leionema
- Species: L. coxii

Binomial name
- Leionema coxii (F.Muell.) Paul G.Wilson

= Leionema coxii =

Species of shrub

Leionema coxii is a shrub species that is endemic to southern New South Wales, Australia. It has an upright habit, dark green, narrow leaves and clusters of white flowers in spring.

== Description ==
Leionema coxii is a pyramid-shaped shrub, 1–3 m (3 ft 3 in – 9 ft 10 in) high, 1 m (3 ft 3 in) wide, occasionally a small tree to 7–8 m (23–26 ft) high with stems that grow at an angle, smooth and glandular. The leaves are lance to narrowly-elliptic shaped, 3–7 cm (1.2–2.8 in) long, 10–15 mm (0.39–0.59 in) wide, upper surface shiny, smooth, margins barely toothed, prominent midrib on lower surface and ending in a sharp point. The inflorescence is a corymb consisting of 10-30 flowers at the end of flattened more or less smooth branches. The yellowish-creamy calyx lobes are wide-triangular, smooth, petals about 5 mm (0.20 in) long and dotted with glands. The upright fruit about 5 mm (0.20 in) long with an angled beak.

== Taxonomy and naming ==
The species was first formally described in 1884 by Ferdinand von Mueller who gave it the name Eriostemon coxii and the description was published in The Australasian Chemist and Druggist. In 1998 Paul G. Wilson changed the name to Leionema coxii and the description was published in the journal Nuytsia. The specific epithet (coxii) honours James Charles Cox a medical practitioner of Sydney for promoting "scientific objects in the neighbouring elder colony".

== Distribution and habitat ==
This species grows in forests, brushland, near water courses and ridges from Morton National Park to the Tuross River area, mostly in the Budawang Range in southern New South Wales.
