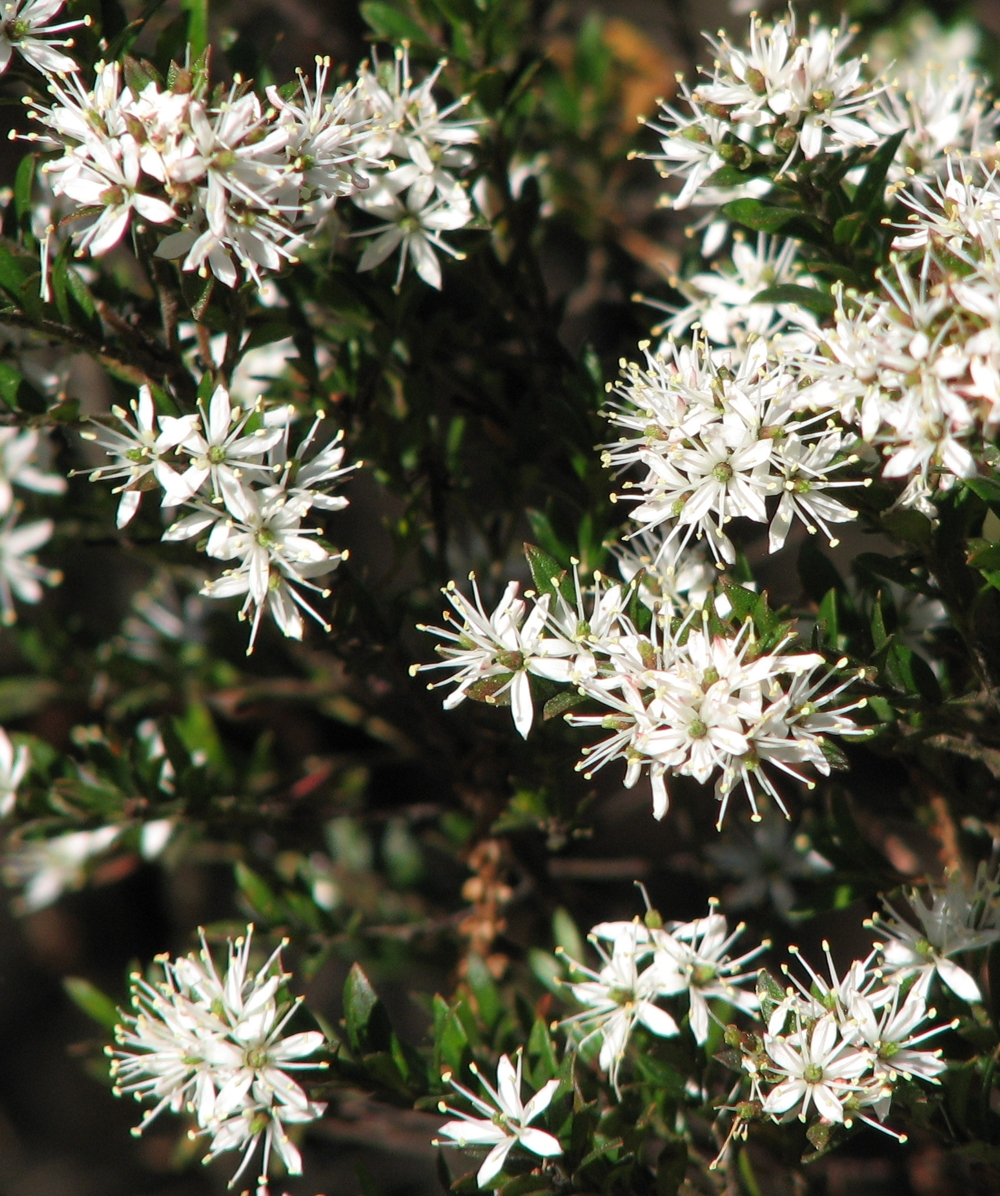
- Leionema lamprophyllum

Scientific classification
- Kingdom: Plantae
- Clade: Tracheophytes
- Clade: Angiosperms
- Clade: Eudicots
- Clade: Rosids
- Order: Sapindales
- Family: Rutaceae
- Subfamily: Zanthoxyloideae
- Genus: Leionema (F.Muell.) Paul G.Wilson

Species
- See text

= Leionema =

Genus of shrubs

Leionema is a genus of more than 20 species of mostly small shrubs in the family Rutaceae, most of which are endemic to eastern Australia. Plants within this genus have scented foliage and clustered, star-shaped flowers which range in colour from cream to bright yellow. Prior to 1998, all species within this genus were included in the genus Phebalium.

== Species list ==
The following is a list of species and subspecies accepted by the Australian Plant Census as at April 2020, and including the New Zealand endemic Leionema nudum:

- Leionema ambiens (F.Muell.) Paul G.Wilson — forest phebalium
- Leionema bilobum (Lindl.) Paul G.Wilson — notched phebalium
  - Leionema bilobum (Lindl.) Paul G.Wilson subsp. bilobum
  - Leionema bilobum subsp. serrulatum (F.Muell.) Duretto & K.L.Durham
  - Leionema bilobum subsp. thackerayense Duretto & K.L.Durham
  - Leionema bilobum subsp. truncatum (Hook.f.) Duretto & K.L.Durham
- Leionema carruthersii (F.Muell.) Paul G.Wilson
- Leionema ceratogynum N.G.Walsh
- Leionema coxii (F.Muell.) Paul G.Wilson
- Leionema dentatum (Sm.) Paul G.Wilson — toothed phebalium
- Leionema diosmeum (A.Juss.) Paul G. Wilson
- Leionema elatius (F.Muell.) Paul G.Wilson — tall phebalium
  - Leionema elatius subsp. beckleri (F.Muell.) Paul G.Wilson
  - Leionema elatius (F.Muell.) Paul G.Wilson subsp. elatius
- Leionema ellipticum Paul G.Wilson
- Leionema equestre (D.A.Cooke) Paul G.Wilson
- Leionema gracile (C.T. White) Paul G.Wilson
- Leionema hillebrandii (J.H. Willis) Paul G.Wilson
- Leionema lachnaeoides (A.Cunn.) Paul G.Wilson
- Leionema lamprophyllum (F.Muell.) Paul G.Wilson — shiny phebalium
  - Leionema lamprophyllum subsp. fractum S.A.J.Bell
  - Leionema lamprophyllum (F.Muell.) Paul G.Wilson subsp. lamprophyllum
  - Leionema lamprophyllum subsp. obovatum F.M.Anderson
  - Leionema lamprophyllum subsp. orbiculare F.M.Anderson
- Leionema microphyllum (F.Muell.) Paul G.Wilson
- Leionema montanum (Hook.) Paul G.Wilson
- Leionema nudum (Hook.) Paul G.Wilson — Mairehau, endemic to the North Island of New Zealand
- Leionema obtusifolium (Paul G.Wilson) Paul G.Wilson
- Leionema oldfieldii (F.Muell.) Paul G.Wilson
- Leionema phylicifolium (F.Muell.) Paul G.Wilson — mountain phebalium
- Leionema praetermissum P.R.Alvarez & Duretto
- Leionema ralstonii (F.Muell.) Paul G.Wilson
- Leionema rotundifolium (A.Cunn. ex Endl.) Paul G.Wilson — round-leaved phebalium
- Leionema scopulinum B.M.Horton & Crayn
- Leionema sympetalum (Paul G.Wilson) Paul G.Wilson — Rylstone Bell
- Leionema viridiflorum (Paul G.Wilson) Paul G.Wilson — green phebalium
- Leionema westonii L.M.Copel. & I.Telford
