= Leionema ceratogynum =

Scientific classification
- Kingdom: Plantae
- Clade: Tracheophytes
- Clade: Angiosperms
- Clade: Eudicots
- Clade: Rosids
- Order: Sapindales
- Family: Rutaceae
- Genus: Leionema
- Species: L. ceratogynum

Binomial name
- Leionema ceratogynum N.G.Walsh

Species of shrub

Leionema ceratogynum is a dense shrub, it grows on the south coast of New South Wales, Australia. It has oval-elliptic shaped leaves, scented foliage and lemon flowers usually in groups of three arising from the leaf axils.

== Description ==
Leionema ceratogynum is dense shrub to 2.5 m (8 ft 2 in) high, immature branchlets with conspicuous ridging and covered with soft, upright, star-shaped hairs. The leaves are oval-elliptic shaped, 12–21 mm (0.47–0.83 in) long, 1.3–2.5 mm (0.051–0.098 in) wide and pointed or rounded at the apex. The leaf surface may be smooth or have short, firm hairs, raised warty oil-glands or occasional star-shaped hairs. The leaf lower surface is white, smooth, covered with small, soft, star-shaped, erect hairs, margins rolled under on a petiole 1.5–3 mm (0.059–0.118 in) long. The inflorescence consists of a tight grouping of usually three pale yellow flowers on a more or less smooth peduncle. The calyx 1–1.5 mm (0.039–0.059 in) long, smooth, lobes triangular shaped, petals narrowly elliptic, 4.5–5 mm (0.18–0.20 in) long, smooth and the stamens 6–8 mm (0.24–0.31 in) long. The elliptic-shaped fruit are 3.5–4 mm (0.14–0.16 in) long ending with a beak 3–4 mm (0.12–0.16 in) long at maturity.

== Taxonomy and naming ==
Leionema ceratogynum was first formally described in 2004 by Neville Grant Walsh and the description was published in Telopea. The specific epithet (ceratogynum) is from the Greek, ceras meaning "horn" and gyne meaning female, alluding to the distinct beaked carpels.

== Distribution and habitat ==
This species has a restricted distribution, only found in the Wadbilliga National Park on the south coast of New South Wales. Found growing on ridges at higher altitudes in mostly dry scrubland, heath and mallee.
