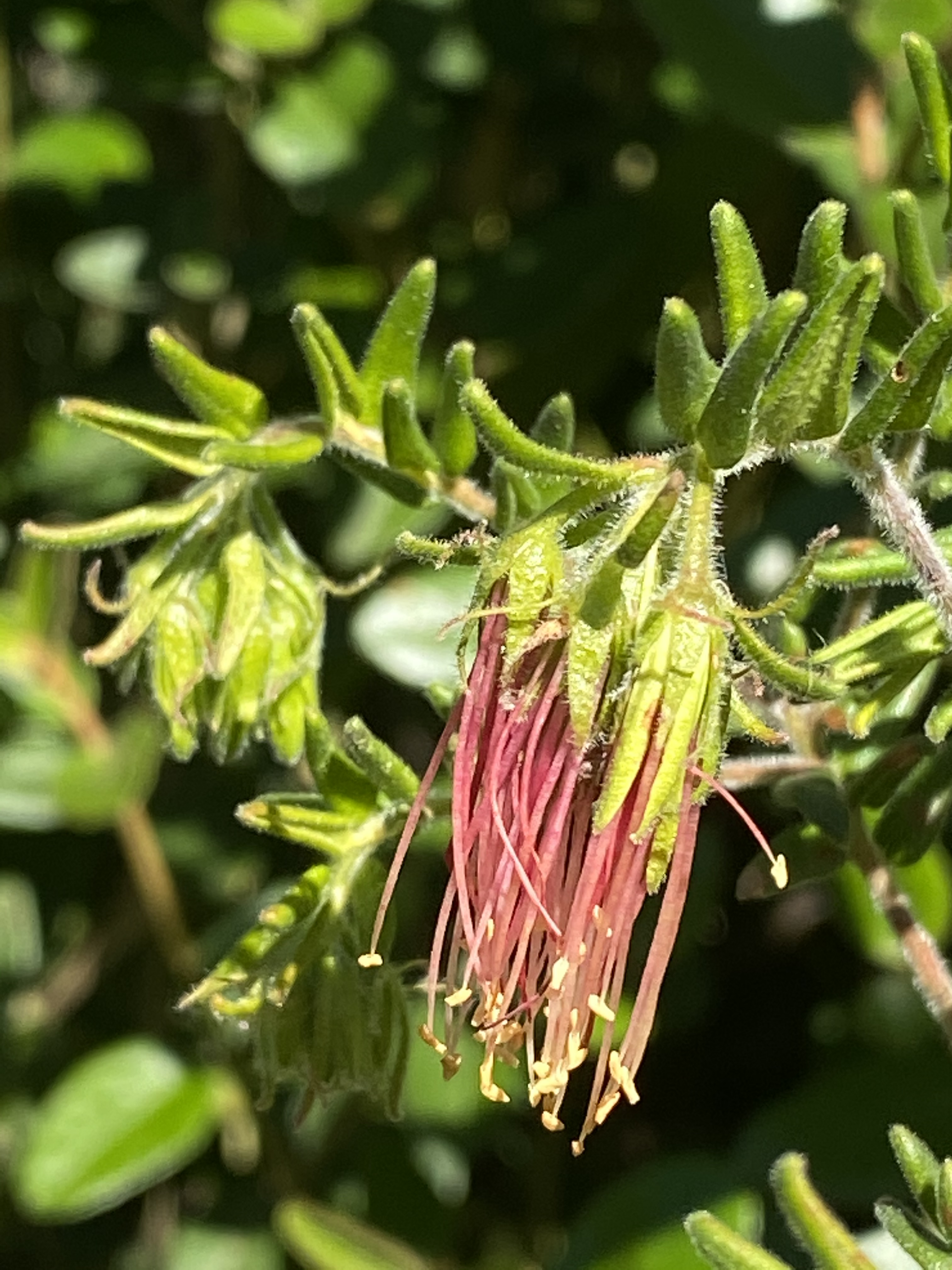

Scientific classification
- Kingdom: Plantae
- Clade: Tracheophytes
- Clade: Angiosperms
- Clade: Eudicots
- Clade: Rosids
- Order: Sapindales
- Family: Rutaceae
- Genus: Leionema
- Species: L. carruthersii

Binomial name
- Leionema carruthersii (F.Muell.) Paul G.Wilson

= Leionema carruthersii =

Species of shrub

Leionema carruthersii is a small shrub that is endemic to southern New South Wales in Australia. It has mostly greenish-yellow flowers, distinctive stamens and lance to egg-shaped leaves.

== Description ==
Leionema carruthersii is a small shrub up to 1 m (3 ft 3 in) high. It has oval to lance shaped leaves about 0.7–1.2 cm (0.28–0.47 in) long, 1.5–5 mm (0.059–0.197 in) wide, rolled edges and either heart shaped or squared at the leaf base on needle-like stems that have occasional fine, weak hairs. The leaves are widely spread with a short petiole and the surface is scantily covered with soft, fine, individual hairs. The inflorescence consists of 4-10 pendulous flowers on a pedicel 2–5 mm (0.079–0.197 in) long. The yellowish-green flowers, rarely red, have distinctive, long, red stamens that are considerably longer than the 7–9 mm (0.28–0.35 in) long petals. The flowers are borne at the end of branches arising from the leaf axils or bracts. The calyces are long, cone-shaped with small, triangular lobes. The seed pod is rough with a warty surface, about 5.5 mm (0.22 in) long with two small horn-like protuberances. Flowering occurs in winter.

== Taxonomy and naming ==
Leionema carruthersii was first formally described in 1998 by Paul G. Wilson and the description was published in the journal Nuytsia.The specific epithet (carruthersii) derivation is not known for certainty but may have been named after Sir Joseph Carruthers who was a former Premier of New South Wales.

== Distribution and habitat ==
This species has a restricted distribution from Batemans Bay to Bega on the New South Wales south coast, growing in sclerophyll forests on granite outcrops.
