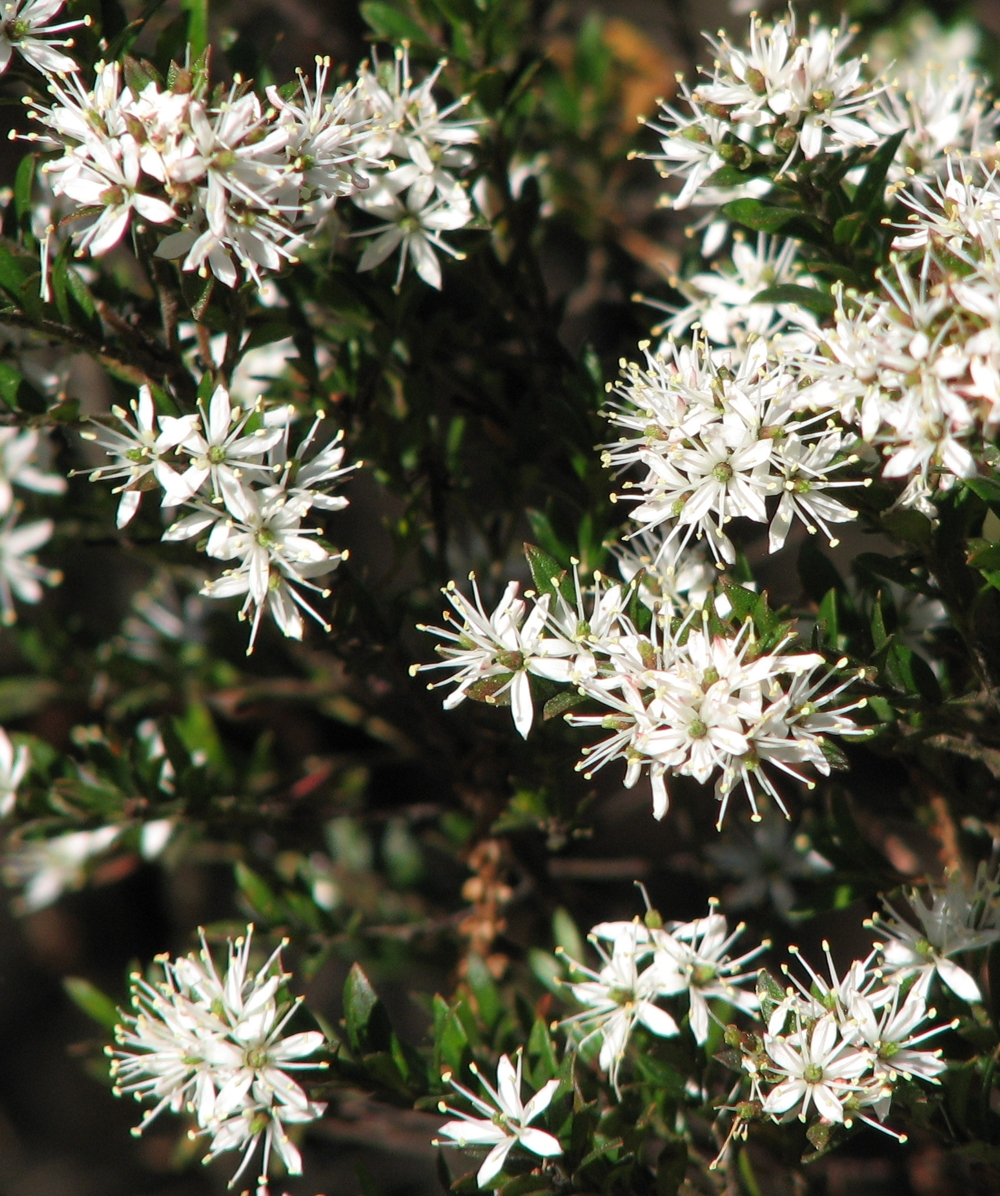

Scientific classification
- Kingdom: Plantae
- Clade: Tracheophytes
- Clade: Angiosperms
- Clade: Eudicots
- Clade: Rosids
- Order: Sapindales
- Family: Rutaceae
- Genus: Leionema
- Species: L. lamprophyllum

Binomial name
- Leionema lamprophyllum (F.Muell.) Paul G.Wilson

Synonyms
- Eriostemon lamprophyllus F.Muell.; Phebalium lamprophyllum (F.Muell.) Benth.

= Leionema lamprophyllum =

Shiny phebalium

Species of shrub

Leionema lamprophyllum commonly known as shiny phebalium,is a flowering shrub in the family Rutaceae. It is a compact shrub with shiny, green leaves, white flowers and is endemic to Australia.

== Description ==
Leionema lamprophyllum is a shrub to 2 m (6 ft 7 in) high, glandular, warty, terete to more or less angled stems when young, star-shaped and simple hairs. Leaves are arranged alternately, aromatic, elliptic to broadly egg-shaped or more or less circular, smooth, 0.3–1 cm (0.12–0.39 in) long, 2–4 mm (0.079–0.157 in) wide and ending in a point or rounded. Flowers are borne in leaf axils or branch terminals, petals narrow-elliptic, 2.3–3.1 mm (0.091–0.122 in) long, white with pink tips on the outside. Flowering occurs in winter-spring and the fruit is a schizocarp capsule about 3 mm (0.12 in) long.

Three subspecies are recognised:

- Leionema lamprophyllum (F.Muell.) Paul G.Wilson subsp. lamprophyllum
- Leionema lamprophyllum subsp. obovatum F.M.Anderson
- Leionema lamprophyllum subsp. orbiculare F.M.Anderson

The species occurs in New South Wales, Victoria and the Australian Capital Territory.
