= Leionema scopulinum =

Scientific classification
- Kingdom: Plantae
- Clade: Tracheophytes
- Clade: Angiosperms
- Clade: Eudicots
- Clade: Rosids
- Order: Sapindales
- Family: Rutaceae
- Genus: Leionema
- Species: L. scopulinum

Binomial name
- Leionema scopulinum B.M.Horton & Crayn

Species of shrub

Leionema scopulinum, is an upright shrub with glossy, dark green, narrow leaves and yellow flowers from autumn to spring. It is found in the Wollemi National Park in New South Wales.

== Description ==
Leionema scopulinum is an erect shrub to 0.5–3 m (1 ft 8 in – 9 ft 10 in) high, angular branchlets and occasional or densely covered in star-shaped hairs. The mostly smooth leaves are narrowly elliptic to slightly lance shaped, tapering to the stalk, 24–65 mm (0.94–2.56 in) long, 4.5–10 mm (0.18–0.39 in) wide, smooth to minute teeth on the edges, notched or rounded at the apex, dark green and glossy on the upperside and duller underneath. The inflorescence consists of a cluster of 9-32 flowers at the end of branches, the pedicels 3.5–8 mm (0.14–0.31 in) long with star-shaped hairs, bracteoles about 0.5 mm (0.020 in) long and grow near the centre of the pedicel. The triangular shaped sepals are 1–1.5 mm (0.039–0.059 in) long with smooth to star-shaped hairs. The yellow to greenish-yellow petals are upright, lance to elliptic shaped, 5–8 mm (0.20–0.31 in) long, smooth and stamens twice the length of the petals. The fruit are a capsule, each segment 5.5–7 mm (0.22–0.28 in) high ending with a beak 1.5–3 mm (0.059–0.118 in) long. Flowering occurs from April to September.

== Taxonomy ==
This species was first formally described in 2004 by Bryony M. Horton and Darren M. Crayn and the description was published in the journal Telopea.

== Distribution and habitat ==
Leionema scopulinum has a restricted distribution only found in the Wollemi National Park in New South Wales growing in heath and woodland in shallow sandy soils.
