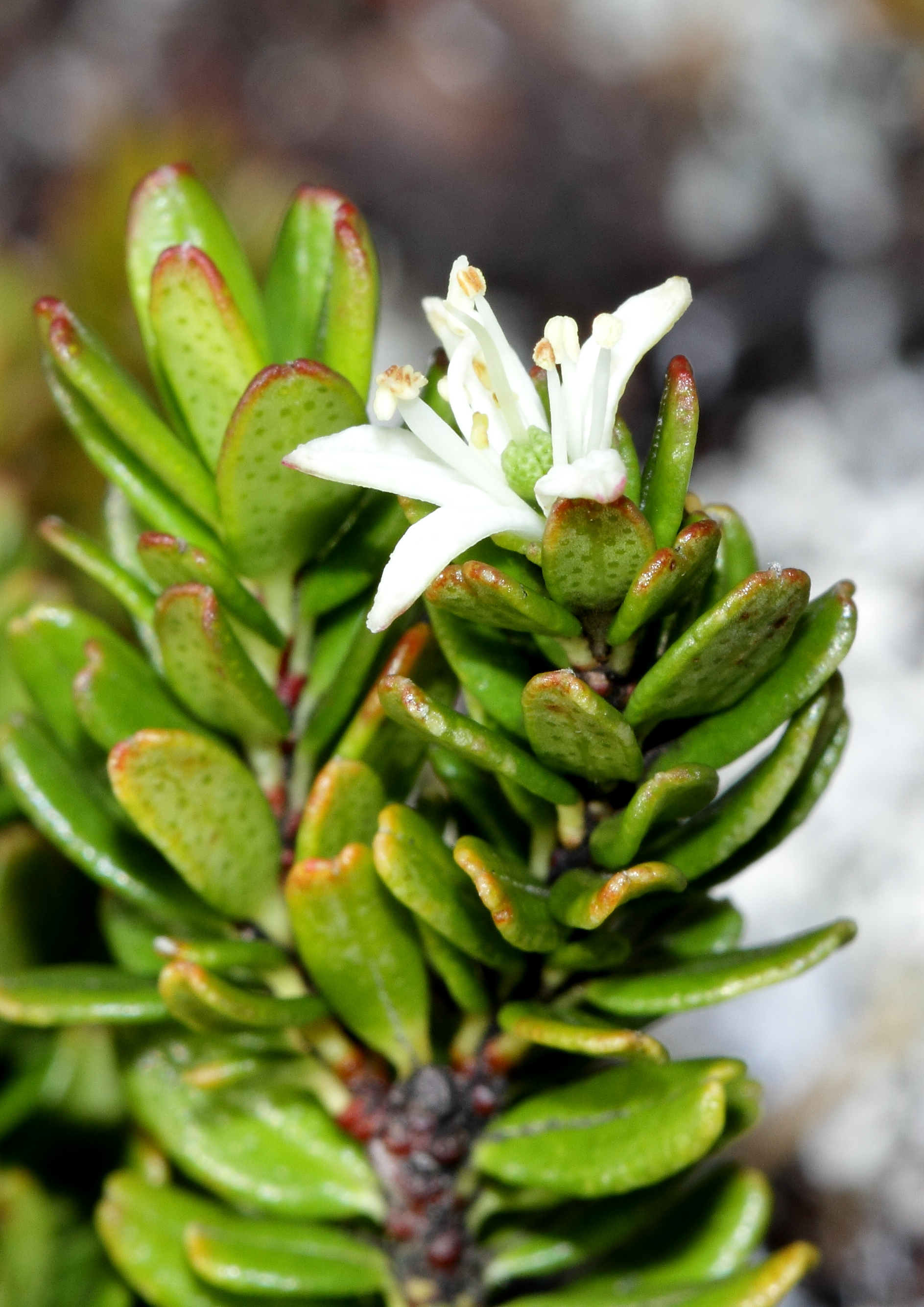
- Wild specimen growing on Gould's Plateau, Tasmania, Australia

Scientific classification
- Kingdom: Plantae
- Clade: Tracheophytes
- Clade: Angiosperms
- Clade: Eudicots
- Clade: Rosids
- Order: Sapindales
- Family: Rutaceae
- Genus: Leionema
- Species: L. oldfieldii

Binomial name
- Leionema oldfieldii (F.Muell.) Paul G.Wilson

= Leionema oldfieldii =

Species of shrub

Leionema oldfieldii is a small shrub that is endemic to mountainous locations in Tasmania, Australia. It has dark green leaves, compact pale pink to white flowers from November to January.

== Description ==
Leionema oldfieldii is a small, compact shrub to 1 m (3 ft 3 in) high. The branchlets are more or less needle-shaped, with usually star to upright shaped soft hairs. The leaves are leathery, smooth, shiny, egg-shaped to oblong-elliptic, 7–15 mm (0.28–0.59 in) long, 2.5–6 mm (0.098–0.236 in) wide, flat with slightly rolled edges and finely scalloped toward the rounded apex. The inflorescence is a tight group of terminal, pale pink to white flowers on a fleshy, smooth pedicel about 2.5 mm (0.098 in) long with two small bracteoles near the base. The petals are elliptic, spreading, about 4 mm (0.16 in) long and smooth. The stamens are slightly longer than the petals. Flowering occurs from late spring to early summer.

== Taxonomy ==
This species was first formally described in 1858 by Ferdinand von Mueller and gave it the name Eriostemon oldfieldii and the description was published in Fragmenta Phytographiae Australiae. In 1998 Paul G. Wilson changed the name to Leionema oldfieldii and the name change was published in the journal Nuytsia.

== Distribution and habitat ==
Leionema oldfieldii grows in mountainous areas of the south and west coasts of Tasmania.
