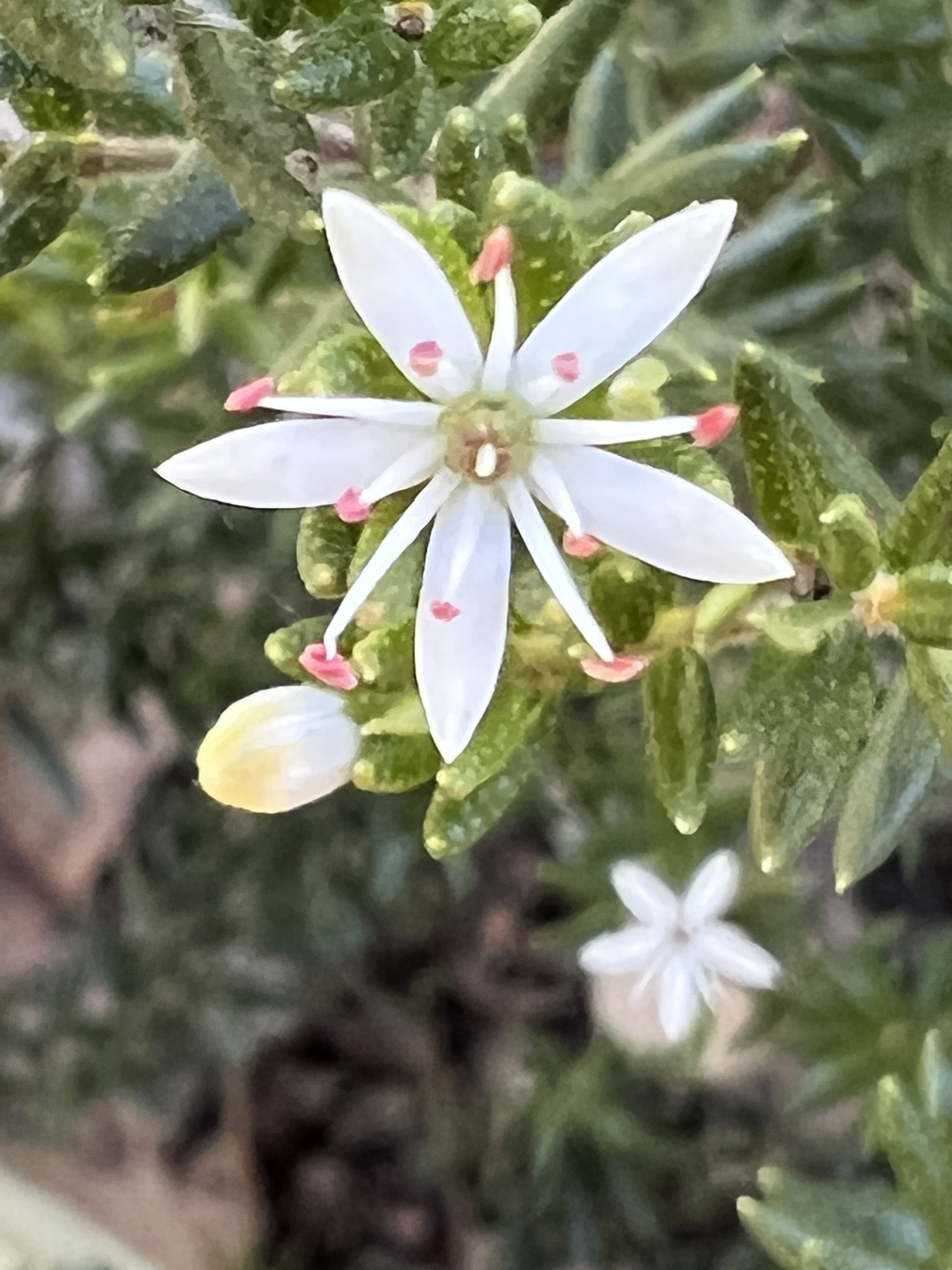

Scientific classification
- Kingdom: Plantae
- Clade: Embryophytes
- Clade: Tracheophytes
- Clade: Spermatophytes
- Clade: Angiosperms
- Clade: Eudicots
- Clade: Rosids
- Order: Sapindales
- Family: Rutaceae
- Genus: Leionema
- Species: L. westonii

Binomial name
- Leionema westonii L.M.Copel. & I.Telford

= Leionema westonii =

Species of shrub

Leionema westonii is a flowering plant in the family Rutaceae and is endemic to New South Wales. It has white flowers borne in upper leaf axils. The species is listed as critically endangered at the both Commonwealth level and in New South Wales.

== Description ==
Leionema westonii is a multi-branched shrub to 70 cm (28 in) high and forms a rhizome. The stems are covered with spreading, soft, fine, simple white hairs. The leaves are linear-shaped or narrow elliptic, 6–16 mm (0.24–0.63 in) long, 1–1.8 mm (0.039–0.071 in) wide, margins rolled under, apex pointed, upper surface covered with spreading, soft, weak hairs, lower surface covered with white, minute protuberances and with sparsely soft, fine, weak hairs. The single flowers are borne in upper leaf axils on a pedicel 3–5.5 mm (0.12–0.22 in) long, bracteole 2.4–2.8 mm (0.094–0.110 in) long and covered with soft, spreading hairs and tapering gradually to a point. The calyx is cup-shaped, 1.3–1.6 mm (0.051–0.063 in) long, with occasional long, stiff, upright hairs, sometimes with minute star-shaped hairs, triangular shaped teeth about 1 mm (0.039 in) long. The white petals are 4–4.6 mm (0.16–0.18 in) long, upper surface smooth, lower surface dotted with glands and with occasional short soft, weak, thin hairs. Flowering occurs from late summer to autumn.

== Taxonomy and naming ==
Leionema westonii was first formally described in 2018 and description was published in Telopea. The specific epithet (westonii) honours Peter Henry Weston a co-discoverer of the species in 2004.

== Distribution and habitat ==
This leionema grows in woodland on shallow soils in the Oxley Wild Rivers National Park.
