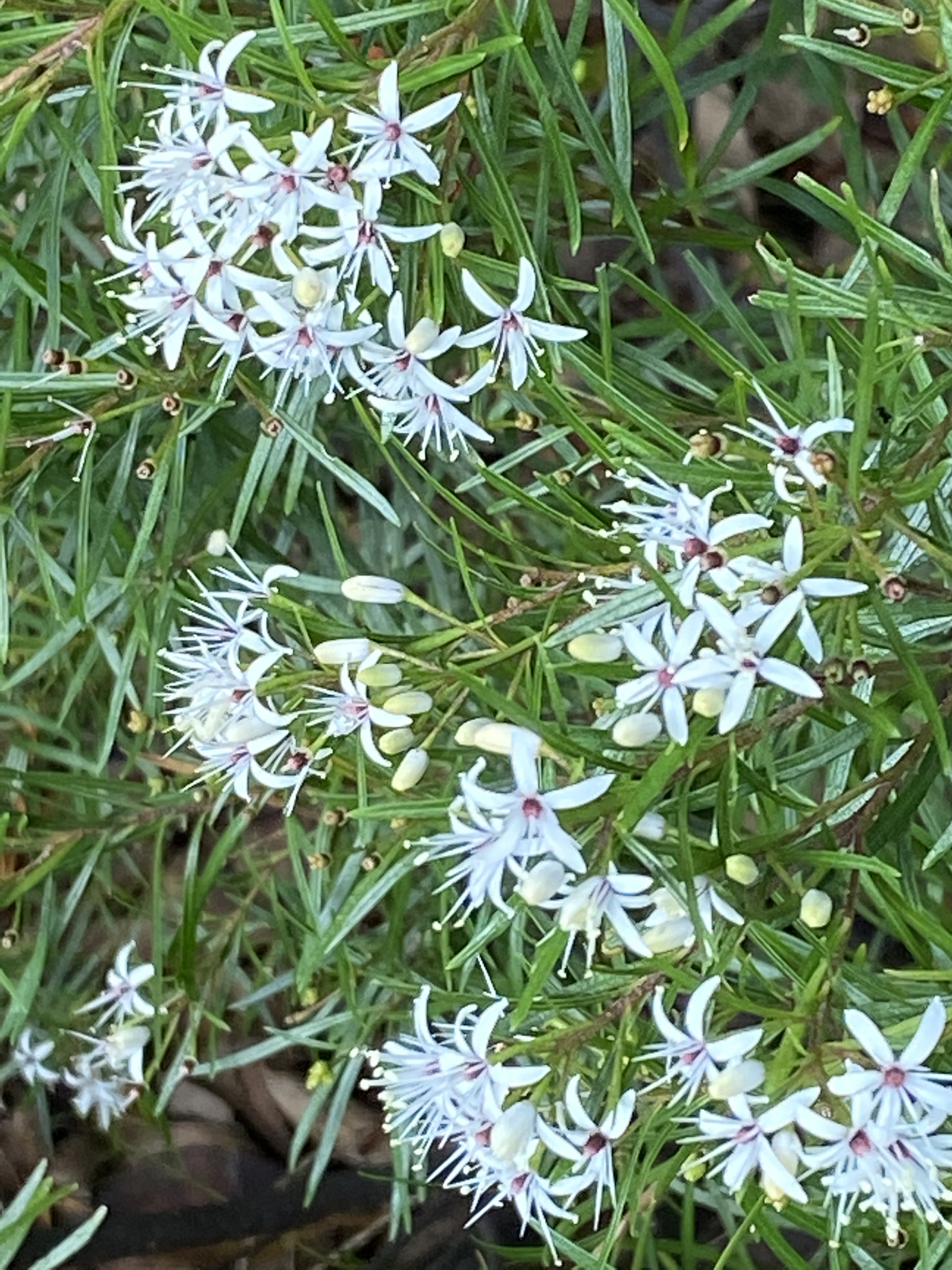

Scientific classification
- Kingdom: Plantae
- Clade: Tracheophytes
- Clade: Angiosperms
- Clade: Eudicots
- Clade: Rosids
- Order: Sapindales
- Family: Rutaceae
- Genus: Leionema
- Species: L. praetermissum

Binomial name
- Leionema praetermissum P.R.Alvarez & Duretto

= Leionema praetermissum =

Species of shrub

Leionema praetermissum, is a shrub with warty stems covered in hairs, white flowers with spreading petals, and prominent stamens. It has a restricted distribution in New South Wales.

== Description ==
Leionema praetermissum is a shrub to 2 m (6 ft 7 in) high with several or few stems emanating from the base. The stems are warty and needle-shaped with occasional white star-shaped hairs. The leaves are smooth, narrow, linear to lance shaped, 20–35 mm (0.79–1.38 in) long, edges slightly rolled under, arranged alternately, sometimes crowded, smooth and sessile or on a short petiole 2 mm (0.079 in) long, and ending with a sharp point. The inflorescence is a cluster of 3-10 flowers at the end of branches or in the leaf axils on a pedicel 5–10 mm (0.20–0.39 in) long, flowers barely longer than the leaves. The peduncle is slender and warty, the pedicels 6–12 mm (0.24–0.47 in) long. The triangular, narrow calyx lobes are smooth on the outside with a stiff apex. The 5 petals are spreading, each petal 4–5 mm (0.16–0.20 in) long, upperside white, underneath pale green, glandular and there are 10 prominent stamens. The fruit is a capsule, 3–4 mm (0.12–0.16 in) long, 2–3 mm (0.079–0.118 in) wide. Flowering occurs from April to July.

== Taxonomy and naming ==
Leionema praetermissum was first formally described by Phillipa Alvarez and Marco Duretto in 2019 and the description was published in the journal Telopea. The specific epithet (praetermissum) is in reference to "this species having been identified as an undescribed taxon for at least three decades before being formally described".

== Distribution and habitat ==
This species has a restricted distribution, it grows in wetlands adjacent to water courses in sand, amongst boulders in vegetation thickets along the Colo River in the Wollemi National Park in New South Wales.
