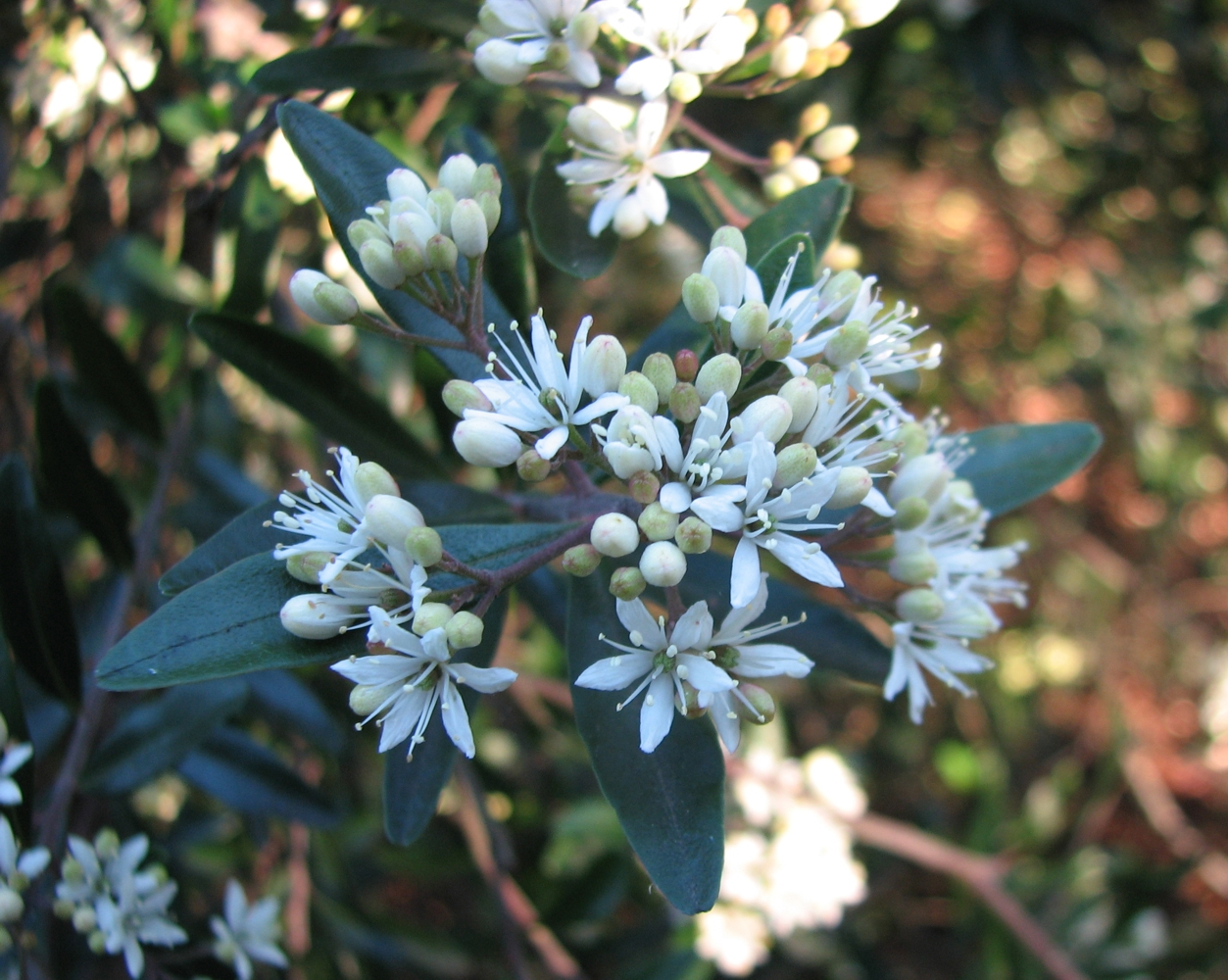
- Subspecies beckleri in Maranoa Gardens

Scientific classification
- Kingdom: Plantae
- Clade: Tracheophytes
- Clade: Angiosperms
- Clade: Eudicots
- Clade: Rosids
- Order: Sapindales
- Family: Rutaceae
- Genus: Leionema
- Species: L. elatius

Binomial name
- Leionema elatius (F.Muell.) Paul G.Wilson

Synonyms
- Eriostemon beckleri F.Muell.; Eriostemon erosus F.Muell. nom. inval., nom. prov.; Phebalium beckleri (F.Muell.) Engl.; Phebalium elatius subsp. beckleri (F.Muell.) Paul G.Wilson

= Leionema elatius =

Species of flowering plant

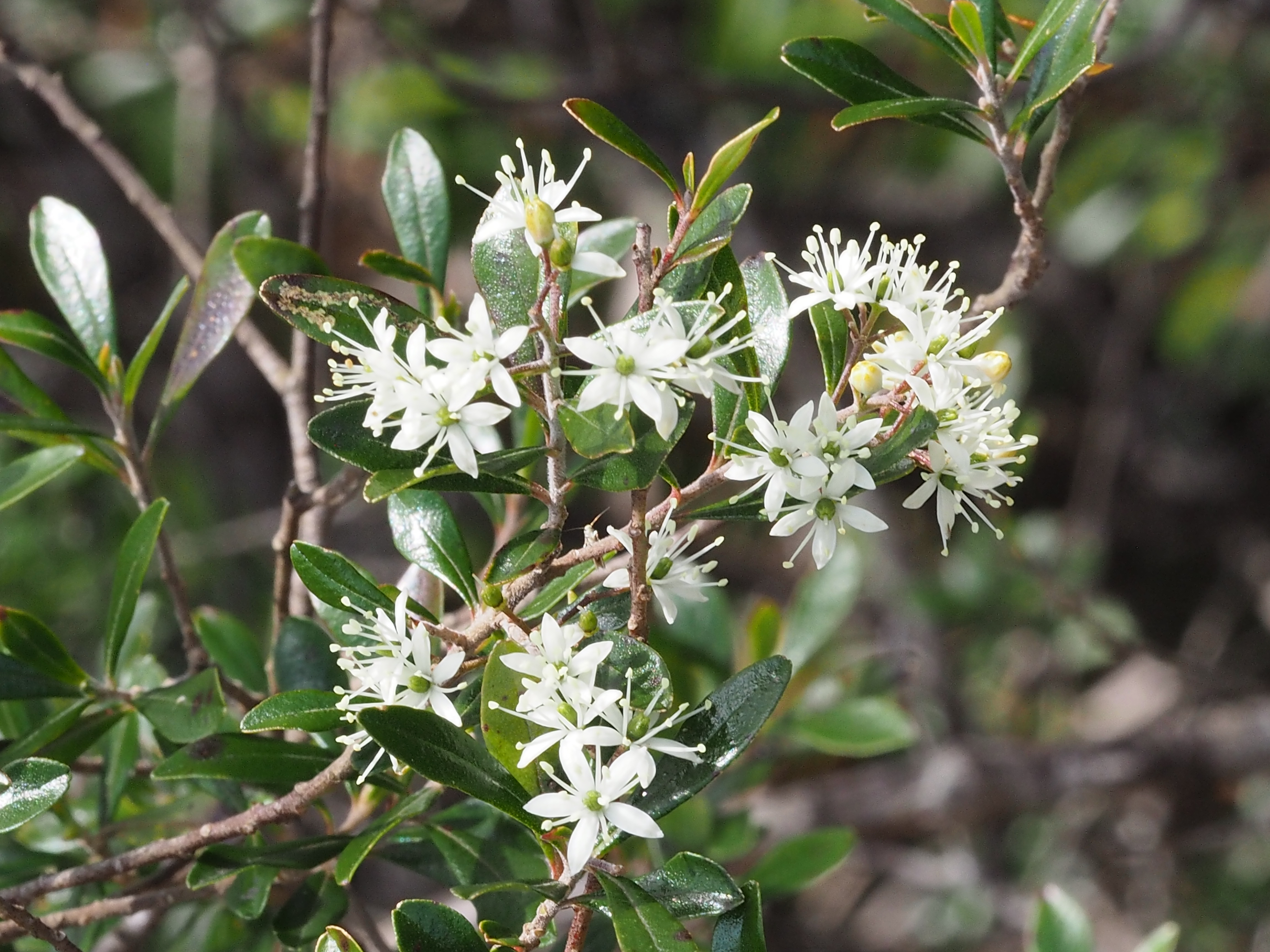
Subspecies elatius in Dorrigo National Park

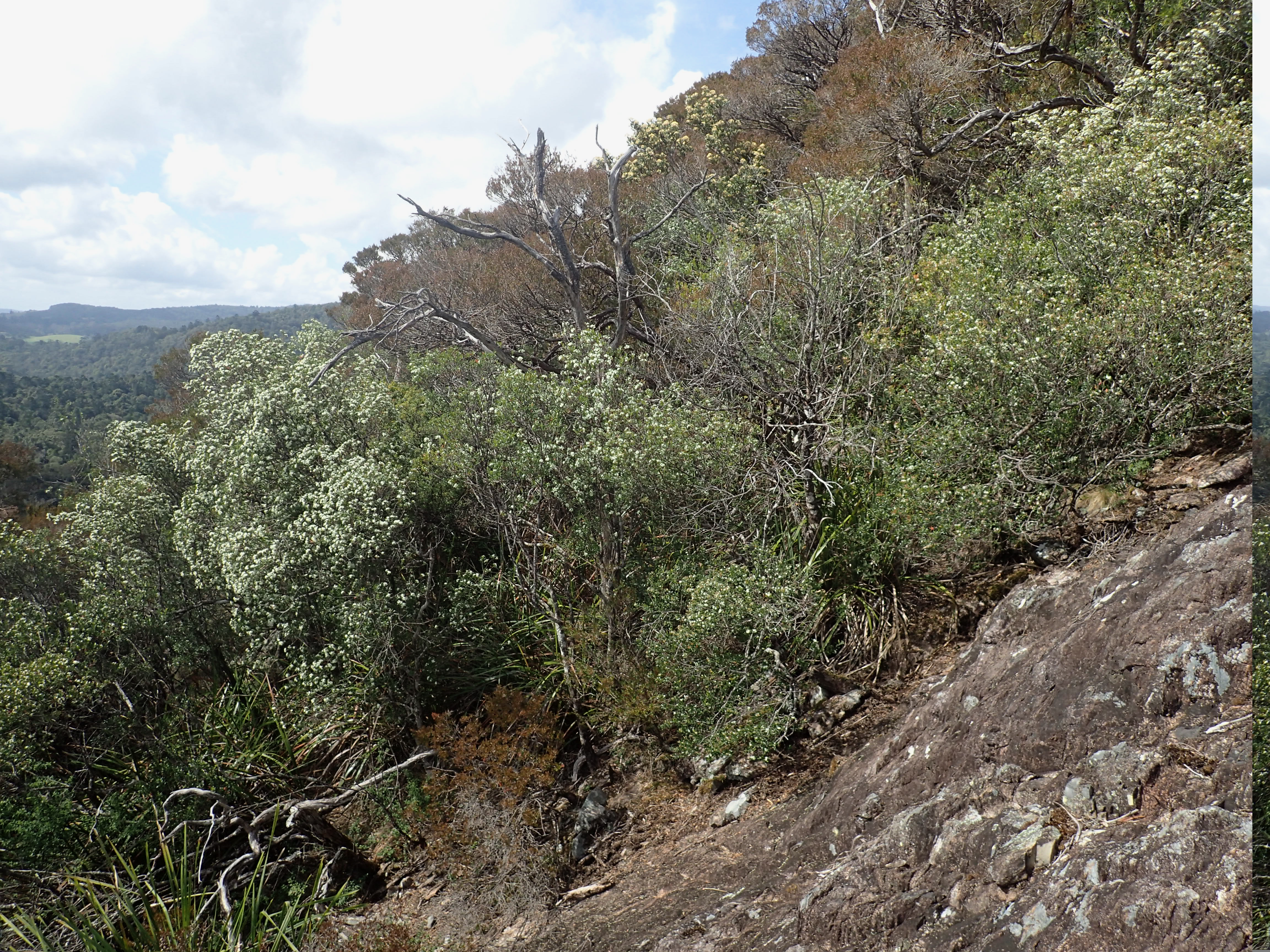
Habit on Dome Mountain in Dorrigo National Park

Leionema elatius, commonly known as tall phebalium, is a shrub species that is endemic to New South Wales and Queensland in Australia. It has glossy green, variably-shaped leaves and clusters of white-lemon flowers in spring.

== Description ==
Leionema elatius is a shrub that grows to 2–5 m (6 ft 7 in – 16 ft 5 in) high with either smooth stems or with star-shaped hairs. The leaves are flat, lance-shaped, oblong or narrowly oval to spoon-shaped, 1.5–3.5 cm (0.59–1.38 in) long, 3–10 mm (0.12–0.39 in) wide, upper surface shiny and smooth with a distinctive midrib below. The inflorescences are at the end of branches crowded by the leaves, pedicels and peduncles both slim. The calyx lobes are wide-triangular shaped and fleshy. The flower petals are white to light yellow, 3–4.5 mm (0.12–0.18 in) long and glandular. The fruit are about 4 mm (0.16 in) long and furrowed. Flowering occurs in spring.

== Taxonomy and naming ==
Tall phebalium was first formally described in 1859 by Ferdinand von Mueller, who gave it the name Eriostemon elatior in Fragmenta phytographiae Australiae from specimens collected near Tenterfield. In 1998, Paul G. Wilson changed the name to Leionema elatius and the change was published in the journal Nuytsia. The specific epithet (elatius) is derived from the Latin meaning "taller".

Wilson described two subspecies and the names are accepted by the Australian Plant Census:

- L. elatius subsp. beckleri is a shrub to about 2 m (6 ft 7 in) high, stems rough and glandular, with more or less lance shaped leaves, 1.5–2 cm (0.59–0.79 in) long, 3–5 mm (0.12–0.20 in) wide, apex blunt or rounded or occasionally slightly notched and the fruit slightly flattened. This subspecies has a restricted distribution in the McPherson Range Queensland and north east New South Wales.
- L. elatius subsp. elatius is a shrub to 5 m (16 ft) high, leaves more or less lance to egg-shaped, 2–3.5 cm (0.79–1.38 in) long, 6–10 mm (0.24–0.39 in) wide, rounded apex slightly notched, mostly smooth stems, flower bud oval-shaped about 4 mm (0.16 in) long, fruit wide and angled from the stem. This subspecies grows in the ranges in north eastern New South Wales, north of Bulahdelah.

== Distribution and habitat ==
Leionema elatius grows mostly on the ranges north of Bulahdelah and far south-eastern areas of Queensland.
