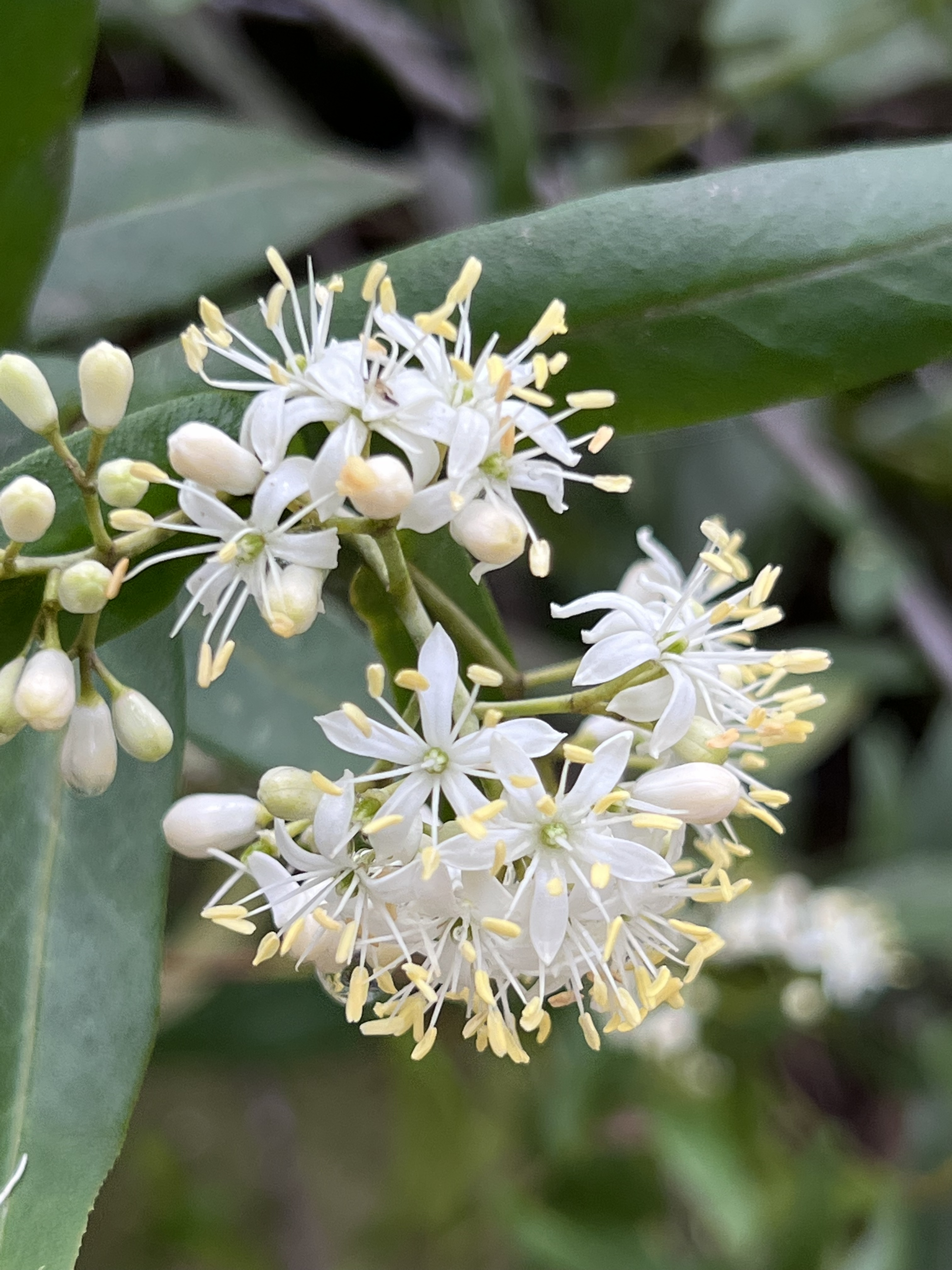

Scientific classification
- Kingdom: Plantae
- Clade: Embryophytes
- Clade: Tracheophytes
- Clade: Spermatophytes
- Clade: Angiosperms
- Clade: Eudicots
- Clade: Rosids
- Order: Sapindales
- Family: Rutaceae
- Genus: Leionema
- Species: L. ambiens

Binomial name
- Leionema ambiens (F.Muell.) Paul G.Wilson

Synonyms
- Eriostemon ambiens F.Muell.; Phebalium ambiens (F.Muell.) Maiden & Betche

= Leionema ambiens =

Species of shrub

Leionema ambiens is a rare shrub growing in the Guyra district of New South Wales and Queensland, Australia. It has long stem clasping leaves and heads of white flowers in spring and early summer.

== Description ==
Leionema ambiens is a small shrub to 2.5 m (8 ft 2 in) high with smooth, mostly needle-shaped stems. The flat leaves may be elliptic, egg-shaped or a wide oblong, 6–10 cm (2.4–3.9 in) long and 25–40 cm (9.8–15.7 in) wide, apex either pointed or rounded, stem-clasping, obvious midrib and margins slightly toothed. The inflorescence is a terminal cluster of 20–200 white flowers, petals about 4.5 mm (0.18 in) long on an angled pedicel. The seed pod is more or less upright, about 3 mm (0.12 in) long with a small beak. Flowering occurs from spring to early summer.

== Taxonomy and naming ==
The species was first formally described in 1868 by Ferdinand von Mueller who gave it the name Eriostemon ambiens, and published the description in his Fragmenta Phytographiae Australiae. In 1998 Paul G. Wilson transferred the species to Leionema as L. ambiens in the journal Nuytsia. The specific epithet (ambiens) is derived from Latin meaning "going around" or "surround".

== Distribution and habitat ==
This species has a restricted distribution, only found in the Guyra district of northern New South Wales growing in heath amongst granite boulders. It also grows in Queensland.
