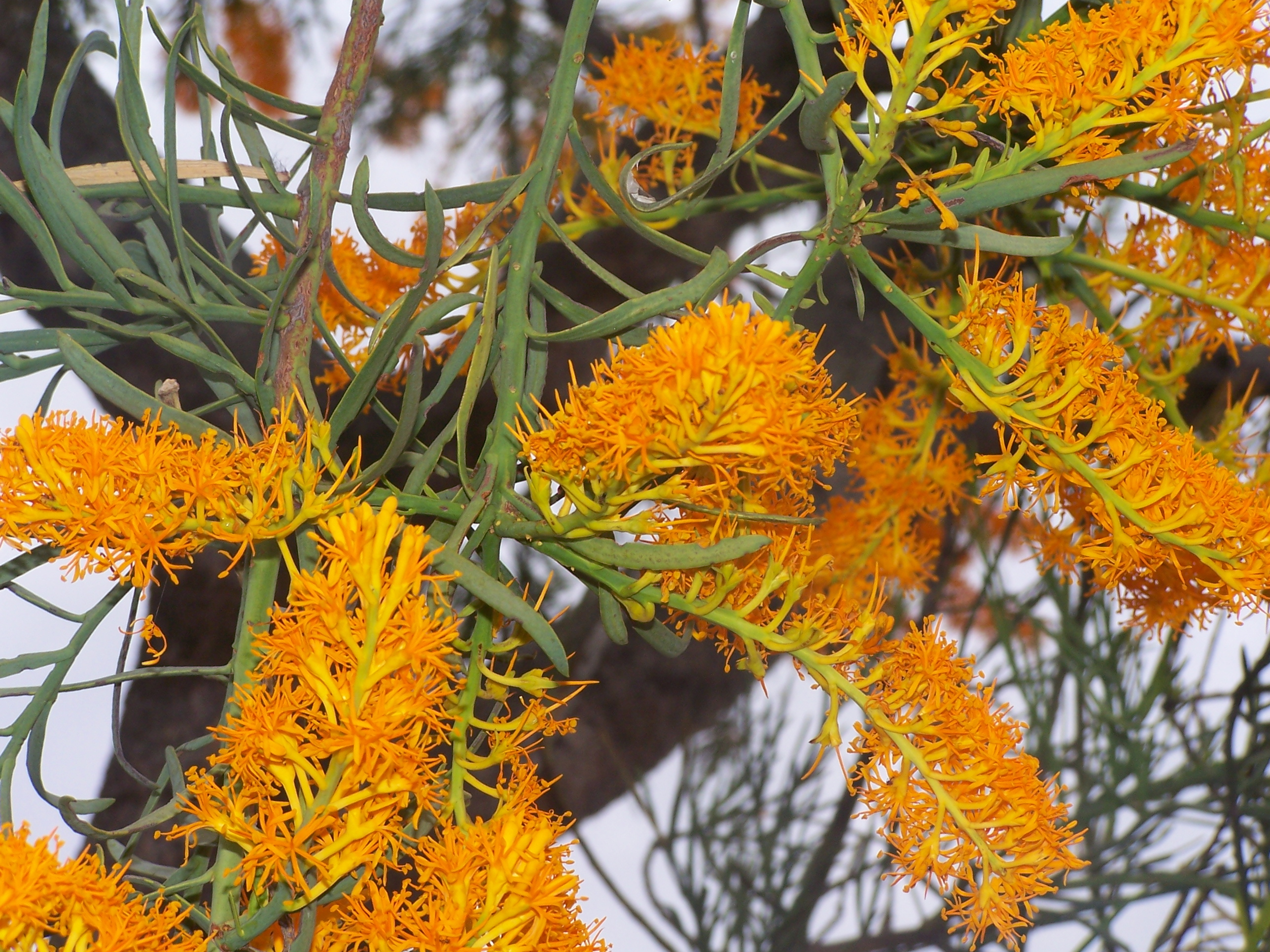

Conservation status
- Least Concern (IUCN 3.1)

Scientific classification
- Kingdom: Plantae
- Clade: Tracheophytes
- Clade: Angiosperms
- Clade: Eudicots
- Order: Santalales
- Family: Loranthaceae
- Genus: Nuytsia; R.Br. ex G.Don
- Species: N. floribunda

Binomial name
- Nuytsia floribunda (Labill.) R.Br. ex G.Don

Synonyms
- Loranthus floribundus Labill.

= Nuytsia =

Genus of mistletoes

Nuytsia floribunda is a hemiparasitic tree found in Western Australia. The species is known locally as moodjar and, more recently, the Christmas tree or Western Australian Christmas tree. The display of intensely bright flowers during the austral summer coincides with the Christmas season.

== Description ==
The habit of the species may be a tree up to 10 metres (33 ft) high, or as a lower-growing shrub. The rough bark is grey-brown. Flowers are a vivid, yellow-orange, appearing sometime between October and January. The inflorescence on each flowering stem may be up to 1 metre (3 ft) in length.

This species is a root hemiparasite, is photosynthetic, and mainly obtains its water and mineral nutrients from its hosts. The haustoria arising from the roots of Nuytsia attach themselves to the roots of many adjacent plants, drawing water and nutrients from them. Almost all other nearby species are susceptible to attack; haustoria have even been found attached to underground cables. In natural settings, however, Nuytsia withdraw relatively little from each individual host, but are attached to so many other plants that the benefits for the hemiparasite are likely to be considerable.

Roots and rhizomes extend out, and may sucker, to form new branches and give the appearance of a grove of trees. A network of fine, fragile roots arises from these larger underground parts, forming haustoria where they meet the roots of other species. These roots or rhizomes can be up to 150 metres (492 feet) in length, the most extensive of any known plant.

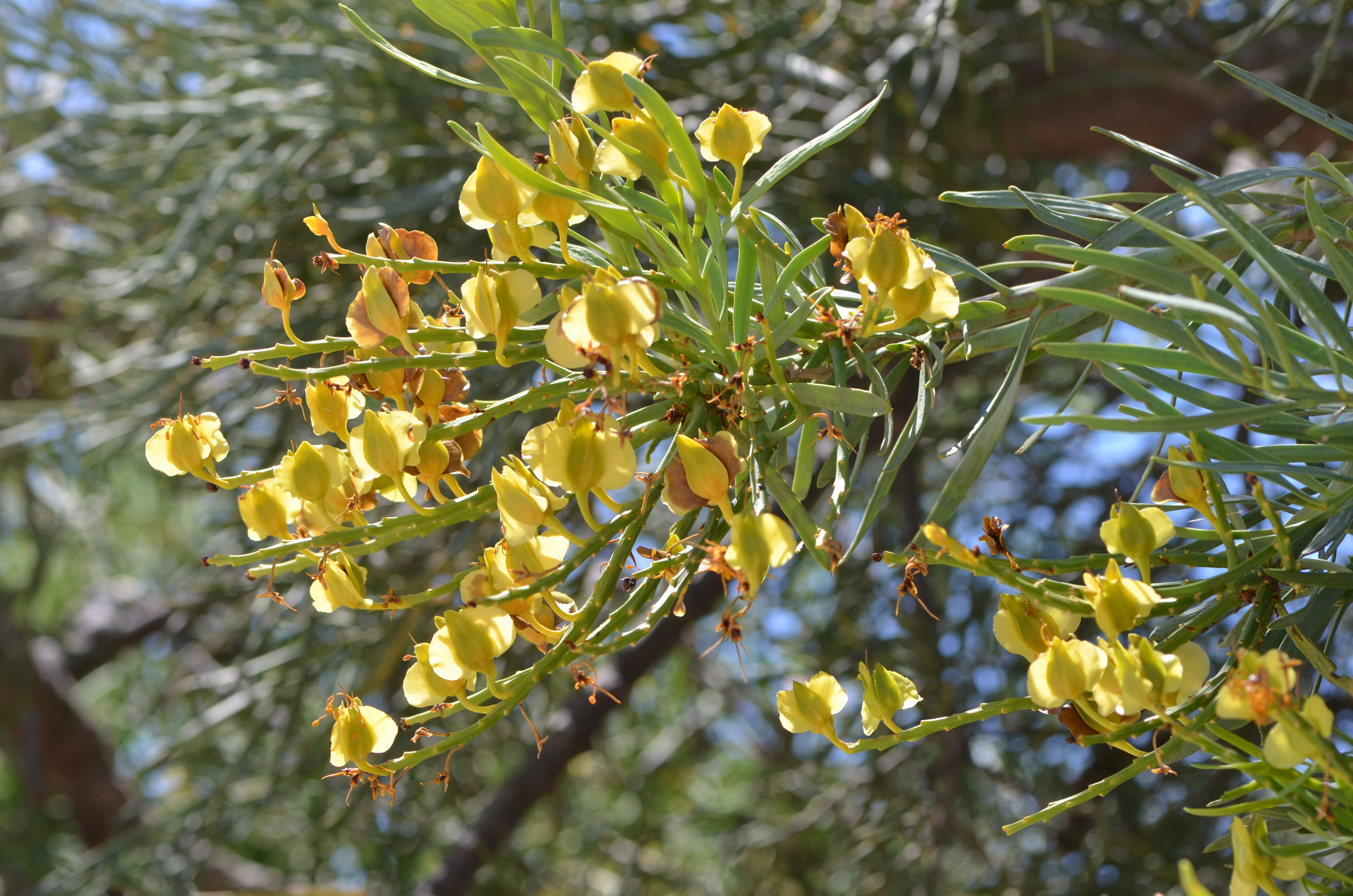
Fruit

The width is up to 1.2 metres in diameter, composed of multiple layers of wood and bark that allow the tree to withstand fire. An unusual characteristic of the seedlings is the four to six cotyledons rather than two.

== Taxonomy ==
Recognised in its earliest descriptions as a species of the Loranthaceae, a family almost entirely represented by epiphytes (mistletoes) allied in the Santalales order. The current treatment of Nuytsia floribunda is as a monotypic genus, Nuytsia. This species was seen as a sister taxon to Atkinsonia ligustrina (Loranthaceae) in its description as Nuytsia ligustrina by Allan Cunningham in 1817.

The first description was published by Jacques Labillardière in Novae Hollandiae Plantarum Specimen (1805) as Loranthus floribundus, the specific epithet describing the profuse flowers he had observed at Esperance. The botanist Robert Brown published a remark on the species in 1831, giving a new genus name without a formal description. A description was published by George Don using Brown's name Nuytsia, an epithet that commemorates the seventeenth-century Dutch explorer and colonial official Pieter Nuyts.

The Noongar names for the plant are moojar, moojerool, munjah and mutyal. For thousands of years, the tree's striking yellow and orange flowers have been a warning sign for Minang Noongar people that fire and flames are coming. It flowers during the Noongar season of birak. The regional name of "Christmas tree" has been applied since the nineteenth century. James Drummond noted in 1843 that the colonists at the Swan River referred to this species as the "fire-tree", given for the resemblance of the inflorescence to a fire in its habitat. William Milligan reported that the first colonists used the term "cabbage tree", a reference to its fragile, white and spongy branches that can be snapped off as easily as the stalks of the European vegetable, cabbage.

== Distribution and habitat ==
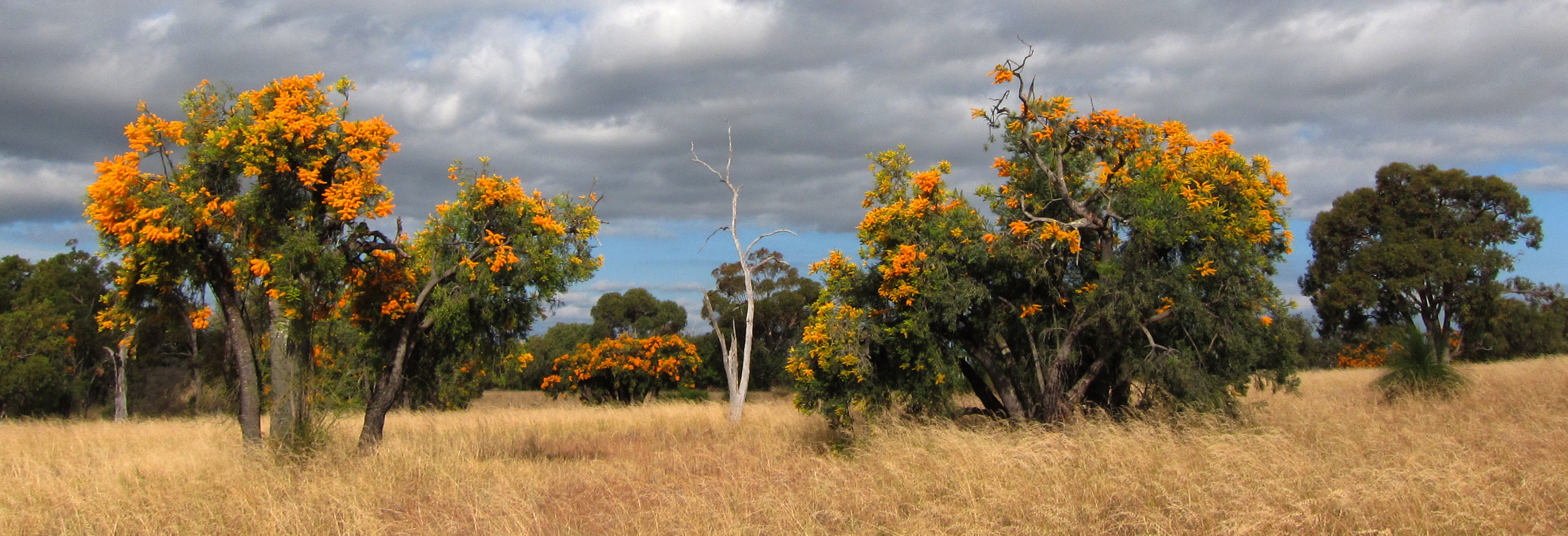
A grove of Nuytsia floribunda trees

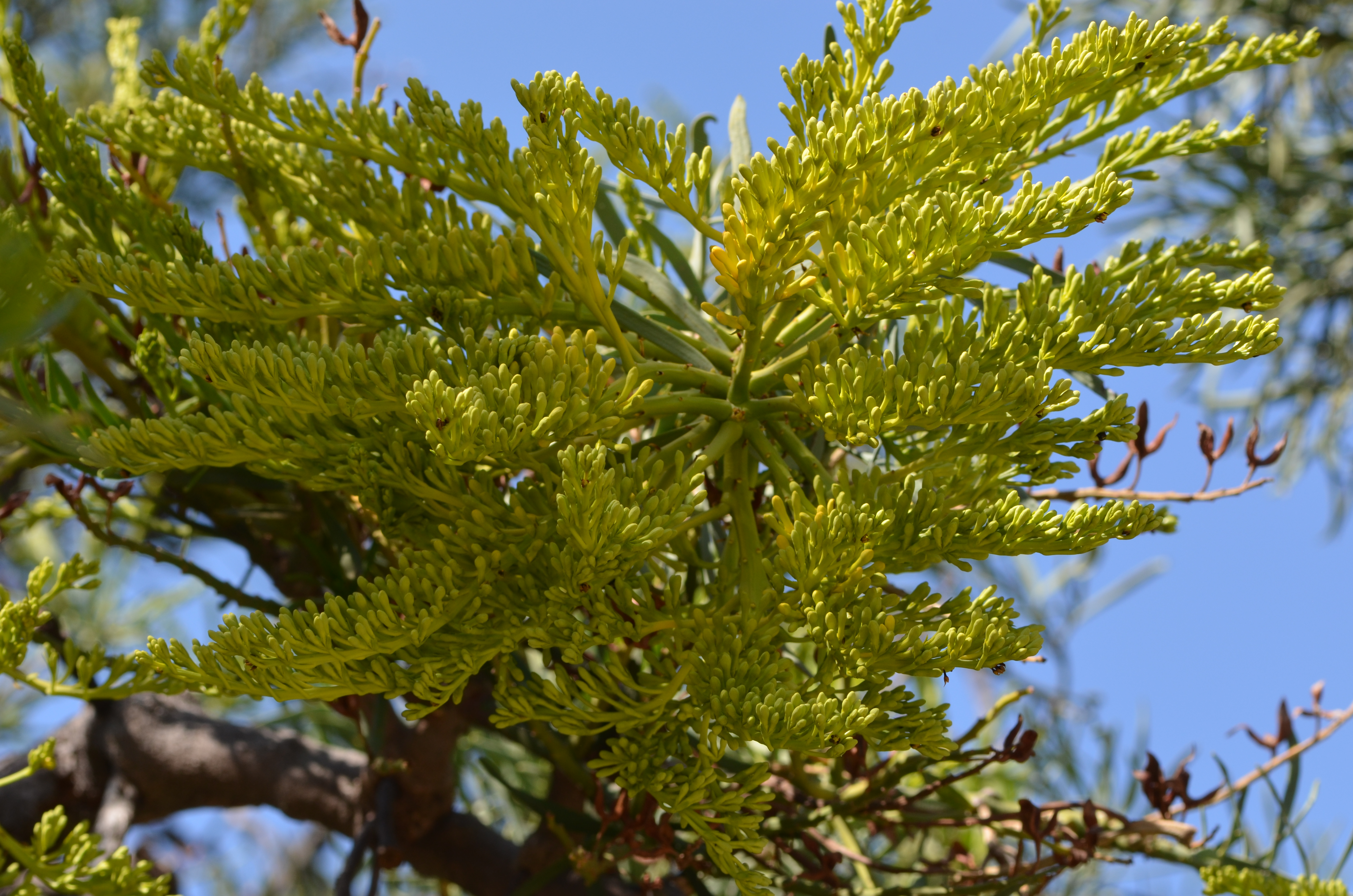
Nuytsia flowers in bud

Nuytsia floribunda is well known in Southwest Australia, especially due to the appearance of abundant flowers in summer, which is a spectacular display. Although Nuytsia seeds germinate readily and seedlings are easy to grow for a year or two, cultivation of the species to maturity is regarded as difficult, with little success outside its native habitat. It appears on a variety of soil types throughout Southwest Australia, the distribution of the species extends to the east of the Esperance Plain and to the north on the Geraldton Sandplains.

The species was once common across the Swan Coastal Plain, now mostly cleared around Perth with changes in land use since colonisation.

== Uses ==
The Noongar people utilise this species during the season of kambarang (around October to early December), obtaining bark to make shields. The gum that exudes from the wound can be collected later; it is sweet, and eaten raw. Flowers from the tree are traditionally used to make a sweet, mead-like beverage during birak. Nuytsia is regarded as a sacred and protected tree by the Noongar; the species is noted for being incorporated into rituals and having a conservation status that forbids its destruction. The plant is venerated by some, who maintain that it should not be sat beneath, nor should its flowers, leaves or branches be touched or removed. The sugary gum is consumed in modest quantities, and children are warned of overindulgence with the story of a monstrous, invulnerable and inescapable nocturnal being, whose cry of "Nhervalong" can be heard as it collects the gum on which it subsists. Seasonal use by other groups of the roots is also known; Ethel Hassell, at Jerramungup, was invited to taste some being harvested by a group of women, reporting the flavour of the flesh beneath the easily-removed skin to be sweet, with a brittle and somewhat watery texture.

The wood of the tree is noted as commercially-useless, and cultivation and transplanting is difficult or impractical for gardens or landscaping, as indicated by the state's conservator, Charles Lane Poole, deeming the showy display of flowers to be its only desirable quality. Poole also noted that the gum that is exuded from the tree may be useful.

The artist Marianne North featured the tree in an illustration titled Study of the West Australian Flame-tree or Fire-tree (c. 1880), now held at Royal Botanic Gardens, Kew, and recorded her effusive impressions: "I shall never forget one plain we came to, entirely surrounded by the nuytsia or mistletoe trees, in a full blaze of bloom. It looked like a bush-fire without smoke. The trees are, many of them, as big as average oaks in our hedgerows at home, …" The early settler George Fletcher Moore described this parasitic tree as another "anomaly in this land of contradictions".

A journal of systematic botany, Nuytsia, published by the Western Australian Herbarium, is named for this tree.

The Annals of Natural History (1842) reported a specimen being grown at a government garden in 1841, and the attempt to raise the few seeds it produced; the correspondence is printed as from "H. Bidwell … of Sidney" [sic].

== Ecology ==
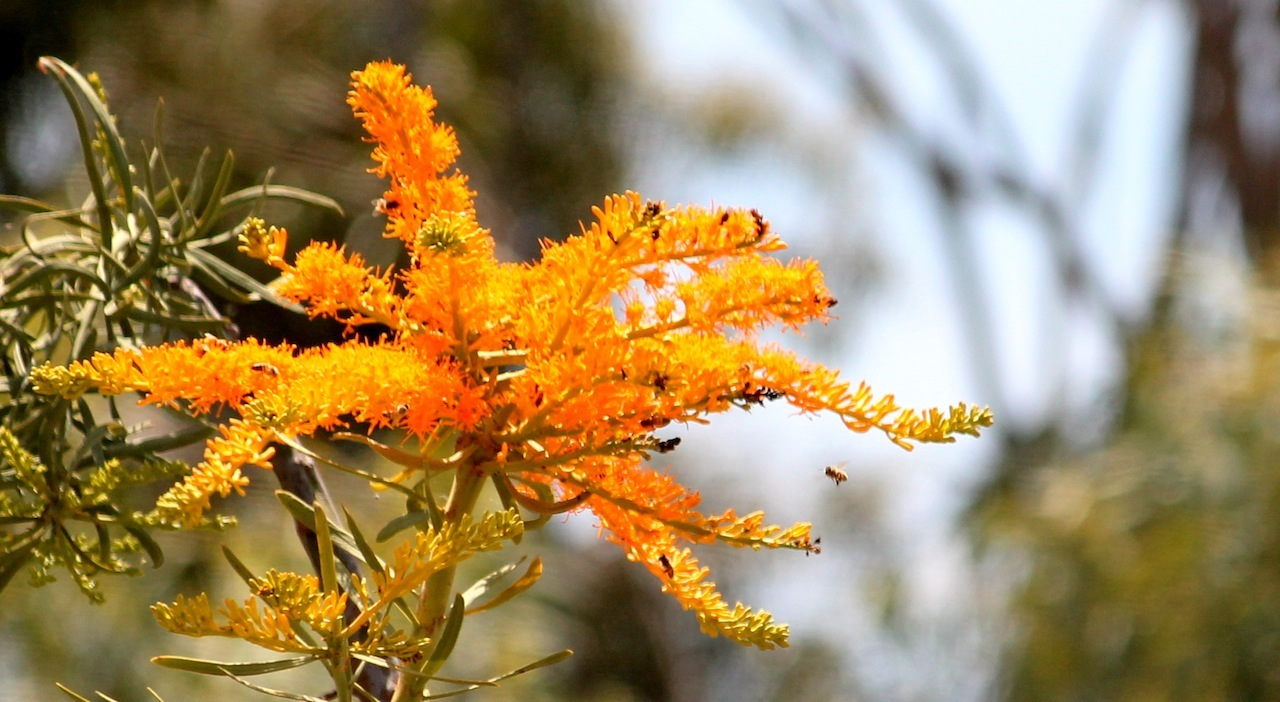
Bees on Nuytsia floribunda flower

The flowers produce large amounts of pollen and nectar that is consumed by insects.

The parasitic relationship of Nuytsia floribunda with host species was poorly understood until an investigation by the botanist D. A. Herbert was presented to the Royal Society of Western Australia, contradicting the assumption that proximity to other trees such as banksia and jarrah was a requirement. Herbert discovered the extended network of filaments that embrace the roots of many other plant species, explaining the persistence of trees conserved in agricultural land cleared for introduced crops.

There are various lists of both native and introduced host species that are vulnerable to attack, however evidence suggests Nuytsia is capable of parasitising an extraordinarily wide range of taxa with only a single published account of a species that appeared immune (Adenanthos cygnorum). The generalised nature of the mode of host root attachment presumably allows parasitism to occur on just about anything within reach.

Nuytsia floribunda was once common and well known on the coastal plain around Perth, often remaining in remnant bushland and gardens, becoming more scarce as the extent and density of urban development increased.

== See also ==
- Metrosideros excelsa, New Zealand Christmas tree
