= List of Nature Conservation Act vulnerable flora of Queensland =

This is a list of the flora of Queensland listed as Vulnerable under the Nature Conservation Act 1992.

== A ==
- Acacia ammophila
- Acacia attenuata
- Acacia barakulensis
- Acacia baueri subsp. baueri
- Acacia chinchillensis
- Acacia crombiei
- Acacia curranii
- Acacia deuteroneura
- Acacia eremophiloides
- Acacia guymeri
- Acacia handonis
- Acacia lauta
- Acacia perangusta
- Acacia peuce waddy
- Acacia pubifolia
- Acacia purpureopetala
- Acacia ruppii
- Acacia solenota
- Acacia sp. (Gwambagwine F.Carter 2)
- Acacia tingoorensis
- Acacia wardellii
- Acalypha lyonsii
- Acriopsis javanica
- Actephila foetida
- Actephila sp. (Koumala I.G.Champion 870)
- Allocasuarina rigida subsp. exsul
- Alloxylon flammeum
- Amorphospermum whitei
- Archidendron lovelliae
- Arenga australasica
- Aristida annua
- Arthraxon hispidus
- Asplenium pellucidum
- Asplenium unilaterale
- Asplenium wildii

== B ==
- Babingtonia squarrulosa
- Babingtonia tozerensis
- Baeckea trapeza
- Baloghia marmorata
- Banksia conferta subsp. conferta
- Bertya pinifolia
- Bertya sp. (Mt Ernest G.Leiper AQ507685)
- Bertya sp. (Winneba D.Jermyn 31)
- Boronia keysii
- Boronia sp. (Aranbanga Creek P.Grimshaw+ PG2597)
- Bothriochloa bunyensis
- Bulbophyllum gracillimum
- Bulbophyllum longiflorum
- Bulbophyllum weinthalii
- Bursaria reevesii

== C ==
- Cadellia pentastylis
- Calamus warburgii
- Callistemon pungens
- Callistemon sp. (Boulia L.Pedley 5297)
- Calophyllum bicolor
- Calytrix gurulmundensis
- Canarium acutifolium var. acutifolium
- Canthium costatum
- Canthium sp. (Thursday Island E.Cowley 10)
- Capparis thozetiana
- Carmona retusa
- Caustis blakei subsp. macrantha
- Chamaesyce carissoides
- Chiloglottis sphyrnoides
- Cissus aristata
- Citrus inodora
- Clematis fawcettii
- Cliffordiochloa parvispicula
- Comesperma oblongatum
- Commersonia sp. (Beeron P.I.Forster PIF4658)
- Coopernookia scabridiuscula
- Corybas montanus
- Corymbia clandestina
- Corymbia leptoloma
- Corymbia rhodops
- Corymbia xanthope
- Croton magneticus
- Cryptocarya foetida
- Ctenopteris blechnoides
- Ctenopteris walleri
- Cupaniopsis shirleyana
- Cupaniopsis tomentella
- Cycas cairnsiana
- Cycas desolata
- Cycas platyphylla
- Cycas semota
- Cycas silvestris
- Cycas tuckeri
- Cyperus clarus
- Cyperus semifertilis

== D ==
- Daviesia discolor
- Daviesia quoquoversus
- Dendrobium bigibbum
- Dendrobium callitrophilum
- Dendrobium carronii
- Dendrobium johannis
- Dendrobium phalaenopsis
- Dendrobium x superbiens
- Denhamia parvifolia
- Dichanthium queenslandicum
- Dissiliaria tuckeri
- Dioclea hexandra
- Diplazium cordifolium
- Dischidia littoralis
- Dodonaea rupicola
- Drosera prolifera
- Drosera schizandra
- Drynaria x dumicola
- Dryopteris sparsa
- Dubouzetia saxatilis

== E ==
- Ectrosia blakei
- Eleocharis retroflexa
- Endiandra hayesii
- Eremophila tetraptera
- Eucalyptus argophloia
- Eucalyptus beaniana
- Eucalyptus hallii
- Eucalyptus infera
- Eucalyptus kabiana
- Eucalyptus magnificata
- Eucalyptus paedoglauca
- Eucalyptus raveretiana
- Eucalyptus scoparia
- Eucalyptus taurina
- Eucalyptus virens
- Eucryphia wilkiei
- Euodia sp. (Oliver Creek L.J.Webb+ 10897)

== F ==
- Floydia praealta
- Fontainea australis
- Fontainea rostrata
- Fontainea venosa
- Freycinetia marginata
- Freycinetia percostata

== G ==
- Gardenia psidioides
- Gaultheria sp. (Mt Merino G.Leiper AQ502686)
- Germainia capitata
- Gonocarpus urceolatus
- Grammitis reinwardtii
- Grastidium tozerense
- Graptophyllum ilicifolium
- Grevillea glossadenia
- Grevillea hockingsii
- Grevillea hodgei
- Grevillea kennedyana
- Grevillea quadricauda
- Grevillea scortechinii
- Grevillea venusta
- Gulubia costata

== H ==
- Hakea maconochieana
- Hakea trineura
- Haloragis exalata
- Hexaspora pubescens
- Hicksbeachia pinnatifolia
- Homoranthus decumbens
- Homoranthus montanus
- Homoranthus porteri
- Huperzia lockyeri
- Huperzia marsupiiformis
- Huperzia phlegmarioides
- Huperzia prolifera
- Hydrocharis dubia

== I/ J ==
- Indigofera oxyrachis
- Jedda multicaulis

== L ==
- Lawrencia buchananensis
- Leionema ellipticum
- Leionema obtusifolium
- Lepiderema sp. (Topaz P.I.Forster+ PIF15478)
- Leptospermum venustum
- Lepturus sp. (Chillagoe M.Godwin C2576)
- Livistona drudei
- Livistona lanuginosa
- Logania diffusa
- Lychnothamnus barbatus

== M ==
- Macadamia claudiensis
- Macadamia integrifolia
- Macadamia ternifolia
- Macadamia tetraphylla
- Macropteranthes montana
- Macrozamia conferta
- Macrozamia crassifolia
- Macrozamia fearnsidei
- Macrozamia machinii
- Macrozamia occidua
- Macrozamia parcifolia
- Marsdenia brevifolia
- Marsdenia coronata
- Marsdenia longiloba
- Marsdenia paludicola
- Marsdenia pumila
- Marsdenia rara
- Marsdenia straminea
- Maundia triglochinoides
- Medicosma elliptica
- Medicosma obovata
- Melaleuca kunzeoides
- Micromyrtus rotundifolia
- Micromyrtus vernicosa
- Myriophyllum coronatum
- Myrmecodia beccarii

== N ==
- Neisosperma kilneri
- Neoroepera buxifolia
- Newcastelia velutina
- Notelaea lloydii

== O ==
- Ochrosperma obovatum
- Omphalea celata
- Owenia cepiodora
- Ozothamnus eriocephalus
- Ozothamnus vagans

== P ==
- Parsonsia bartlensis
- Parsonsia kroombitensis
- Parsonsia larcomensis
- Paspalidium grandispiculatum
- Paspalidium udum
- Persicaria elatior
- Phaius pictus
- Phebalium glandulosum subsp. eglandulosum
- Phebalium whitei
- Philotheca acrolopha
- Philotheca sporadica
- Picris evae
- Plectranthus amoenus
- Plectranthus gratus
- Plectranthus leiperi
- Pomaderris crassifolia
- Pomatocalpa marsupiale
- Prasophyllum wallum
- Prostanthera palustris
- Prostanthera sp. (Dunmore D.M.Gordon 8A)
- Prostanthera sp. (Mt Tozer L.J.Brass 19478)
- Pterostylis bicornis
- Pultenaea setulosa
- Pultenaea stuartiana

== Q ==
- Quassia bidwillii
- Quassia sp. (Kennedy River J.R.Clarkson 5645)

== R ==
- Rhaphidospora bonneyana
- Rhinerrhiza moorei
- Ricinocarpos speciosus
- Romnalda strobilacea

== S ==
- Sarcochilus hartmannii
- Sarcochilus hirticalcar
- Sarcochilus roseus
- Sclerolaena blakei
- Sclerolaena walkeri
- Solanum carduiforme
- Solanum dunalianum
- Solanum sp. (Dalby R.F.Kelsey 56)
- Sophora fraseri
- Sowerbaea subtilis
- Spathoglottis plicata
- Stemmacantha australis
- Stemona angusta
- Stylidium longissimum
- Swainsona murrayana
- Symplocos baeuerlenii
- Syzygium hodgkinsoniae
- Syzygium moorei
- Syzygium velarum

== T ==
- Tephrosia leveillei
- Thelepogon australiensis
- Thelypteris confluens
- Thesium australe
- Tinospora tinosporoides
- Trichoglottis australiensis
- Trigonostemon inopinatus
- Triplarina nitchaga
- Trymalium minutiflorum

== V / W ==
- Vanda hindsii
- Westringia parvifolia
- Westringia rupicola
- Wetria australiensis
- Wodyetia bifurcata

== X / Z ==
- Xanthostemon oppositifolius
- Xerothamnella parvifolia
- Zeuxine polygonoides
- Zieria aspalathoides var. ovata
- Zieria collina
- Zieria rimulosa
