= Zieria tenuis =

Scientific classification
- Kingdom: Plantae
- Clade: Tracheophytes
- Clade: Angiosperms
- Clade: Eudicots
- Clade: Rosids
- Order: Sapindales
- Family: Rutaceae
- Genus: Zieria
- Species: Z. tenuis

Binomial name
- Zieria tenuis Duretto & P.I.Forst.

Species of shrub

Zieria tenuis is a plant in the citrus family Rutaceae and endemic to the northern inland of Queensland. It is an open, straggly shrub with wiry branches, three-part leaves and groups of nine to twelve flowers with four white or pinkish petals and four stamens. It is similar to Z. collina but has larger petals, and to Z. cytisoides which has different leaf venation and differently shaped leaflets.

== Description ==
Zieria tenuis is an open, straggly shrub which grows to a height of 1.5 m (5 ft) and has wiry branches covered with soft hairs. The leaves are composed of three oblong to narrow elliptic leaflets, the central leaflet one 9–32 mm (0.4–1 in) long and 3–7 mm (0.1–0.3 in) wide. The leaves have a petiole 5–18 mm (0.2–0.7 in) long. The lower surface of the leaflets have raised veins and the upper surface is covered with minute, star-like hairs. The flowers are arranged in groups of nine to twelve in leaf axils, the groups shorter than the leaves. The groups are on a stalk 8–18 mm (0.3–0.7 in) long and only about 0.5 mm (0.02 in) wide. The flowers are surrounded by scale-like bracts 1–3 mm (0.04–0.1 in) long which remain during flowering. The sepals are triangular, about 1–2.5 mm (0.04–0.1 in) long and 1 mm (0.04 in) wide and the four petals are white or pinkish, elliptic to egg-shaped, about 2 mm (0.08 in) long and 1 mm (0.04 in) wide with star-like hairs on both surfaces. There are four stamens. Flowering occurs between April and July and is followed by fruits which are smooth, glabrous capsules about 3 mm (0.1 in) long and 2 mm (0.08 in) wide.

== Taxonomy and naming ==
Zieria tenuis was first formally described in 2007 by Marco Duretto and Paul Irwin Forster from a specimen collected from Agate Creek near Forsayth and the description was published in Austrobaileya. The specific epithet (tenuis) is a Latin word meaning "thin", referring to the thin flower stalk.

== Distribution and habitat ==
This zieria occurs near Forsayth and in the White Mountains National Park in the Desert Uplands and Einasleigh Uplands bioregions.
