= Pterostylis bicornis =

Horned greenhood

Conservation status
- Vulnerable (EPBC Act)

Scientific classification
- Kingdom: Plantae
- Clade: Tracheophytes
- Clade: Angiosperms
- Clade: Monocots
- Order: Asparagales
- Family: Orchidaceae
- Subfamily: Orchidoideae
- Tribe: Cranichideae
- Genus: Pterostylis
- Species: P. bicornis

Binomial name
- Pterostylis bicornis D.L.Jones & M.A.Clem.

Synonyms
- Petrorchis bicornis ([D.L.Jones & M.A.Clem.) D.L.Jones & M.A.Clem.; Speculantha bicornis (D.L.Jones & M.A.Clem.) D.L.Jones & M.A.Clem.

Species of orchid

Pterostylis bicornis, commonly known as horned greenhood, is a plant in the orchid family Orchidaceae and is endemic to eastern Australia. Non-flowering plants have a rosette of leaves while flowering plants have a similar rosette at the base of a flowering spike with a one or two dark green, white and brown flowers. The flowers have distinctive long, thin horn-like tips.

== Description ==
Pterostylis bicornis, is a terrestrial, perennial, deciduous, herb with an underground tuber. Non-flowering plants have a rosette of between three and seven fleshy, bright green leaves, each leaf 3–7 mm (0.1–0.3 in) long and 4–5 mm (0.2–0.2 in) wide. Flowering plants have a similar rosette on side-growths and one or two dark green, white and brown flowers on a flowering stem 60–100 mm (2–4 in) tall with three or four stem leaves. The flowers are 8–10 mm (0.3–0.4 in) long and about 2 mm (0.08 in) wide. The dorsal sepal and petals are joined to form a hood called the "galea" over the column with the dorsal sepal having a short tip and the petals narrow, horn-like tips 4–5 mm (0.16–0.20 in) long. The lateral sepals are erect, fused to each other at their base and have a slightly bulging sinus between them and narrow tips 3–4 mm (0.1–0.2 in) long. The labellum is about 4 mm (0.2 in) long, 1 mm (0.04 in) wide with a thickened tip, curved and protruding above the sinus. Flowering occurs in June and July.

== Taxonomy and naming ==
Pterostylis bicornis was first formally described in 1987 by David Jones and Mark Clements from a specimen collected on Mount Maroon. The description was published in Proceedings of the Royal Society of Queensland. The specific epithet (bicornis) is a Latin word meaning "two-horned".

== Distribution and habitat ==
The horned greenhood grows in shallow soil pockets in rock crevices with moss and lichen. It is only known from Mount Maroon and the Mount Barney National Park in southern Queensland and from near Woodenbong in far northern New South Wales.

== Conservation ==
Pterostylis bicornis is classified as "vulnerable" under the Australian Government Environment Protection and Biodiversity Conservation Act 1999 (EPBC Act). The main threats to the species are illegal collection, inappropriate fire regimes and weed invasion.
