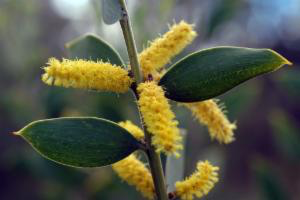

Conservation status
- Vulnerable (EPBC Act)

Scientific classification
- Kingdom: Plantae
- Clade: Tracheophytes
- Clade: Angiosperms
- Clade: Eudicots
- Clade: Rosids
- Order: Fabales
- Family: Fabaceae
- Subfamily: Caesalpinioideae
- Clade: Mimosoid clade
- Genus: Acacia
- Species: A. pubifolia

Binomial name
- Acacia pubifolia Pedley
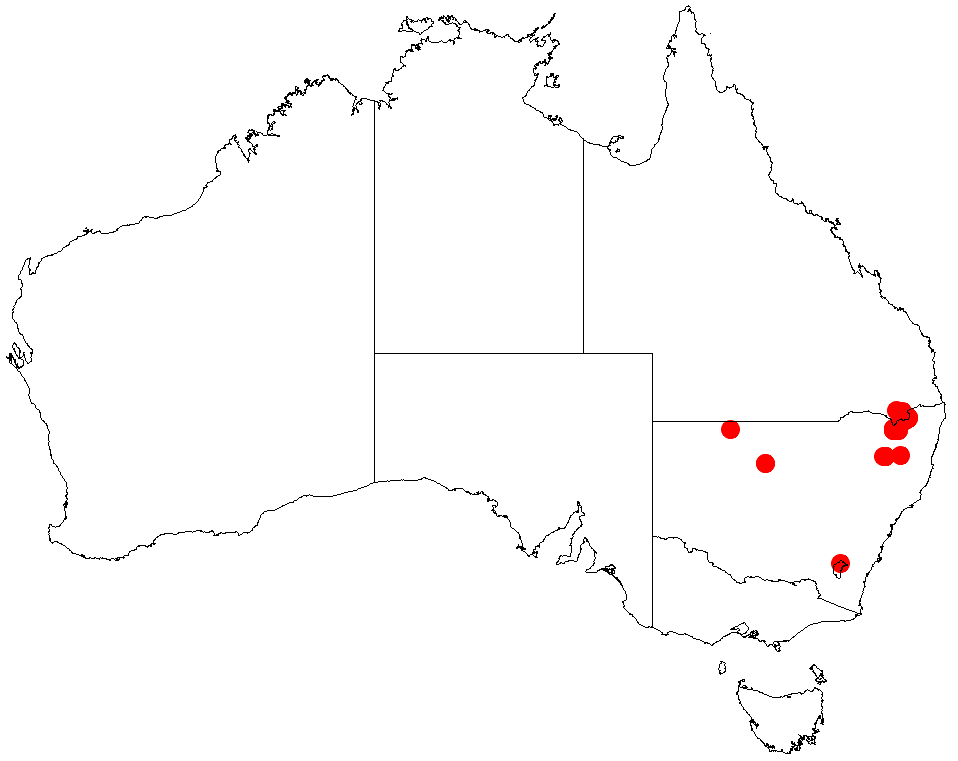
- Occurrence data from AVH

= Acacia pubifolia =

Species of wattle

Acacia pubifolia commonly known as velvet wattle, is a species of flowering plant in the family Fabaceae. It is endemic to northern New South Wales, Australia. It is an upright or spreading tree with bright yellow flowers.

== Description ==
Acacia pubifolia is a single-stemmed shrub or tree to 8 m (26 ft) high with dark, rough bark. The branches are brown or orange to brown, occasionally slightly covered with a powdery, waxy coating and softly hairy. The phyllodes are elliptic or narrowly egg-shaped, straight, 2–10 cm (0.79–3.94 in) long, 8–30 mm (0.31–1.18 in) wide, velvety hairy, aging to soft, erect hairs, and prominent veins from tip to base. One or two flowers are borne in phyllode axils, more or less sessile, flower heads cylindrical, 2–5 cm (0.79–1.97 in) long, golden yellow, peduncle 0–2 mm (0.000–0.079 in) long, white and thickly hairy. The calyx is 0.5–0.9 mm (0.020–0.035 in) long, squared or deeply divided part of the length, white, softly hairy, corolla 1.6–1.8 mm (0.063–0.071 in) long and smooth. Flowering occurs from September to November and the fruit is a linear pod, more or less flattened and straight, 3–8 cm (1.2–3.1 in) long, 3–4 cm (1.2–1.6 in) wide, papery, greyish and covered in soft, short hairs.

== Taxonomy and naming ==
Acacia pubifolia was first formally described in 1964 by Leslie Pedley and the description was published in Proceedings of the Royal Society of Queensland. The specific epithet (pubifolia) means "softly, hairy leaved".

== Distribution and habitat ==
Acacia pubifolia grows on rocky granite hillsides and in loam soil in dry sclerophyll forest near Emmaville and Torrington, New South Wales. In Queensland it grows in the Darling Downs district from Glen Aplin to Wallangarra.

== Conservation status ==
Acacia pubifolia is listed as "vulnerable" under the Australian Environment Protection and Biodiversity Conservation Act 1999. It is also listed as "Endangered" under the Queensland Nature Conservation Act 1992 and New South Wales Biodiversity Conservation Act 2016.
