= Westringia parvifolia =

Conservation status
- Vulnerable (EPBC Act)

Scientific classification
- Kingdom: Plantae
- Clade: Tracheophytes
- Clade: Angiosperms
- Clade: Eudicots
- Clade: Asterids
- Order: Lamiales
- Family: Lamiaceae
- Genus: Westringia
- Species: W. parvifolia

Binomial name
- Westringia parvifolia C.T.White & W.D.Francis, 1921
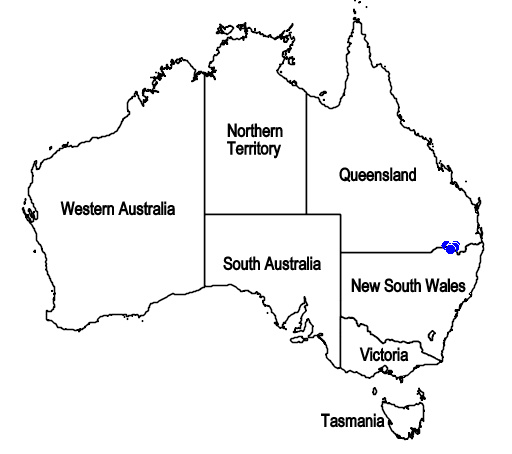
- Known range of Westringia parvifolia (in blue)

Species of flowering plant

Westringia parvifolia is a species of plant in the mint family that is endemic to Australia.

== Description ==
The species grows as a shrub to about 1 m in height. The tiny oval leaves are about 1.5–3 mm long and 1 mm wide, appearing in whorls of three. The flowers occur in the upper leaf axils and are white to pale purple in colour with small reddish spots.

== Distribution and habitat ==
The species has a limited range, straddling the state border from the vicinity of Yelarbon and Inglewood in south-eastern Queensland, to the Yetman district of northern New South Wales. It grows on sandy and stony soils in association with mallee box and green mallee trees as well as spinifex hummocks.

== Conservation ==
The species has been listed as Vulnerable under Australia's EPBC Act. Potential threats include land clearing, hydrological change, and pollution.
