= Acacia deuteroneura =

Conservation status
- Vulnerable (EPBC Act)

Scientific classification
- Kingdom: Plantae
- Clade: Tracheophytes
- Clade: Angiosperms
- Clade: Eudicots
- Clade: Rosids
- Order: Fabales
- Family: Fabaceae
- Subfamily: Caesalpinioideae
- Clade: Mimosoid clade
- Genus: Acacia
- Species: A. deuteroneura

Binomial name
- Acacia deuteroneura Pedley

Synonyms
- Racosperma deuteroneurum (Pedley) Pedley

Species of legume

Acacia deuteroneura is a species of flowering plant in the family Fabaceae and is endemic to a small area in Queensland, Australia. It is a shrub with narrowly elliptic, oblong or more or less lance-shaped phyllodes, spherical heads of yellow flowers and glabrous, firmly papery pods covered with a powdery bloom.

== Description ==
Acacia deuteroneura is a shrub that typically grows to a height of about 3 m (9.8 ft) and has glabrous branchlets covered with a white, powdery bloom. Its phyllodes are narrowly elliptic to oblong or more or less lance-shaped with the narrower end towards the base, 30–60 mm (1.2–2.4 in) long, 6–12 mm (0.24–0.47 in) wide, leathery and glaucous with a prominent midrib. The flowers are borne in spherical heads in a raceme 30–50 mm (1.2–2.0 in) long on a peduncle 10–16 mm (0.39–0.63 in) long, each head with 20 to 30 yellow flowers. Flowering has been recorded in August, and the pods are firmly papery, up to 50 mm (2.0 in) long, 12–13 mm (0.47–0.51 in) wide and covered with a powdery bloom. The seeds are oblong to elliptic, 3.5–4 mm (0.14–0.16 in) long and more or less dull black with a club shaped aril.

== Taxonomy ==
Acacia deuteroneura was first formally described in 1980 by Leslie Pedley in the journal Austrobaileya from specimens he collected on the Great Dividing Range about 40 mi (64 km) north-north-east of Tambo in 1968.

== Distribution ==
This species of wattle is known from two locations north of Tambo where it grows on a knoll of weathered sandstone with Eucalyptus bakeri. Fewer than 100 specimens were observed at one location in 1973.

== Conservation status ==
Acacia deuteroneura is listed as "vulnerable" under the Australian Government Environment Protection and Biodiversity Conservation Act 1999 and as "critically endangered" under the Queensland Government Nature Conservation Act 1992.

== See also ==
- List of Acacia species
