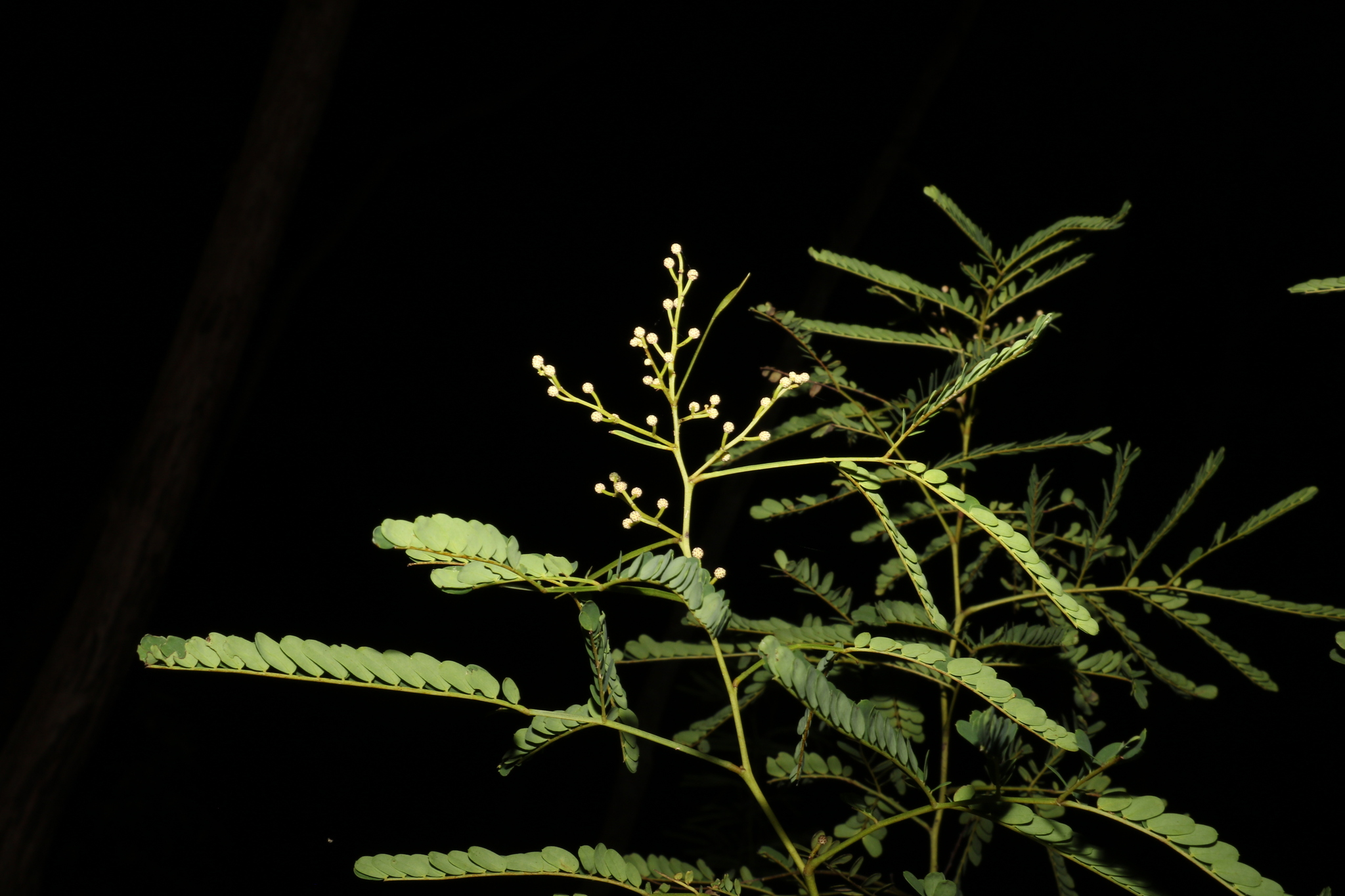
- Near Palmview

Conservation status
- Vulnerable (EPBC Act)

Scientific classification
- Kingdom: Plantae
- Clade: Embryophytes
- Clade: Tracheophytes
- Clade: Angiosperms
- Clade: Eudicots
- Clade: Rosids
- Order: Fabales
- Family: Fabaceae
- Subfamily: Caesalpinioideae
- Clade: Mimosoid clade
- Genus: Acacia
- Species: A. attenuata

Binomial name
- Acacia attenuata Maiden & Blakely
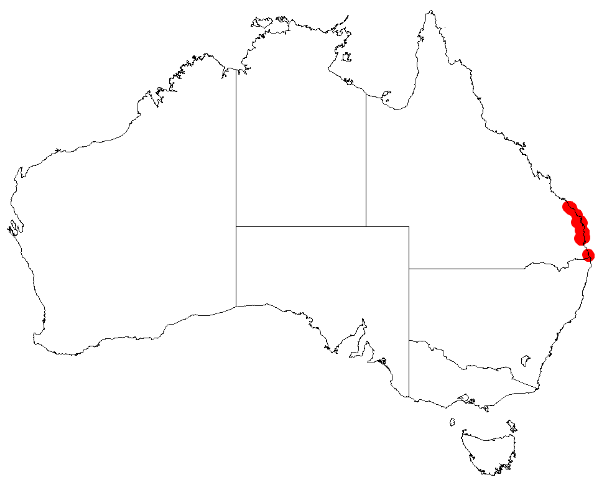
- Acacia attenuata occurrence data from Australasian Virtual Herbarium

Synonyms
- Racosperma attenuatum (Maiden & Blakely) Pedley

= Acacia attenuata =

Species of flowering plant

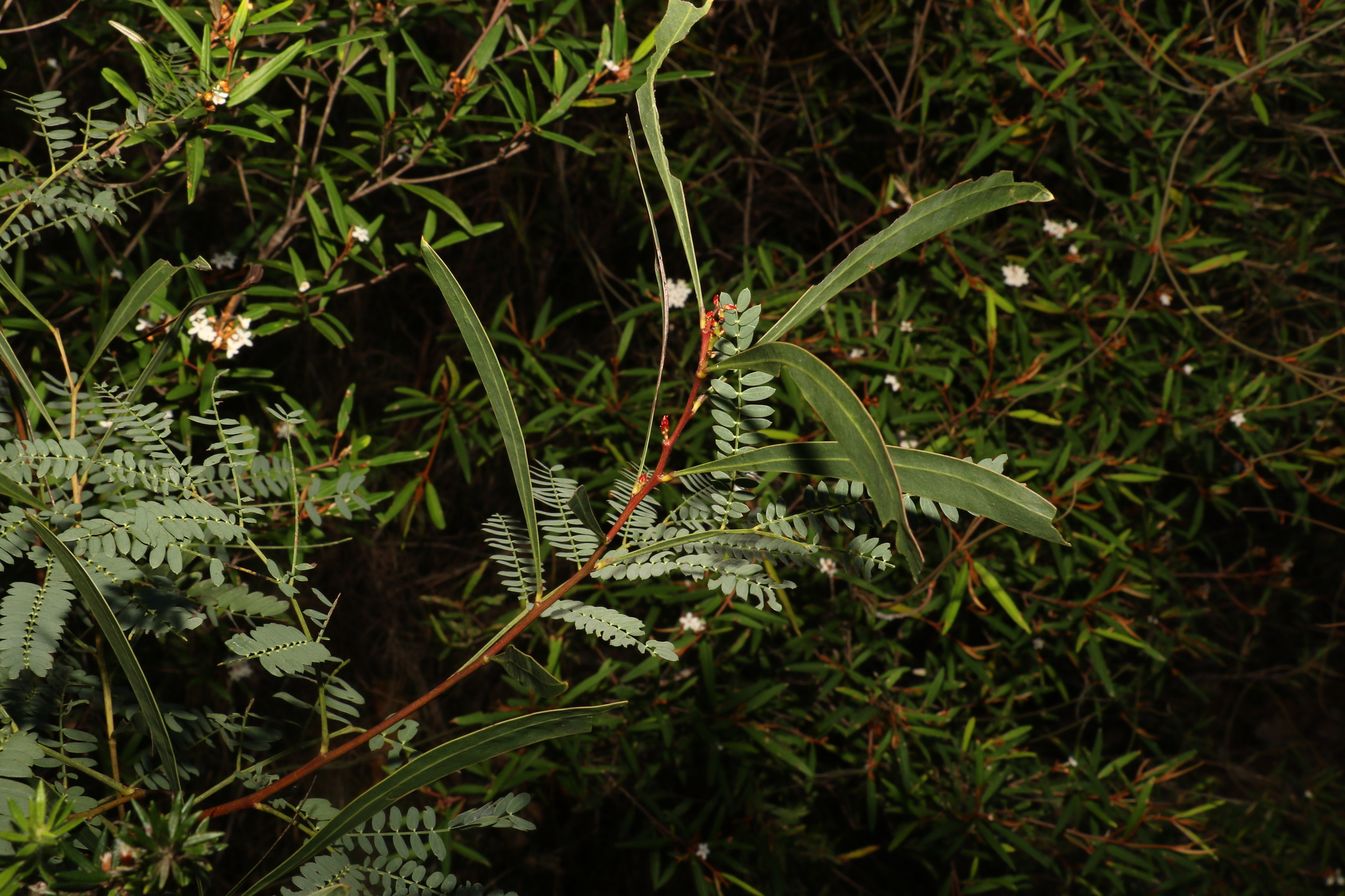
Foliage near Noosaville

Acacia attenuata is a species of flowering plant in the family Fabaceae and is endemic to south-east Queensland. It is a slender shrub with lance-shaped or narrowly oblong phyllodes, often also juvenile bipinnate leaves, cream-coloured flowers arranged in head of 20 to 35, and papery or leathery pods up to 100 mm (3.9 in) long.

== Description ==
Acacia attenuata is a slender shrub that typically grows to a height of 3–4 m (9.8–13.1 ft) and has glabrous branchlets. Its phyllodes are lance-shaped with the narrower end towards the base, or narrowly oblong, 90–150 mm (3.5–5.9 in) long, 7–21 mm (0.28–0.83 in) wide, and often has juvenile bipinnate leaves that persist for a long period. The flowers are borne in six to fourteen spherical heads on a peduncle 7–10 mm (0.28–0.39 in) long, each head with 20 to 35 cream-coloured flowers. Flowering has been recorded from May to August and in November, and the pods are up to 100 mm (3.9 in) long and 6–11 mm (0.24–0.43 in) wide and constricted between the seeds. The seeds are narrowly oblong, blackish, firmly papery to thinly leathery, about 100 mm (3.9 in) long, 13–20 mm (0.51–0.79 in) wide and rounded over the seeds. The seeds are oblong to elliptic, dark brown, about 6 mm (0.24 in) long with a club-shaped aril.

== Taxonomy ==
Acacia attenuata was first formally described in 1927 by Joseph Maiden and William Blakely in Proceedings of the Royal Society of Queensland from specimens collected near Beerwah by Cyril Tenison White in 1922. The specific epithet ("attenuata") means 'narrowing to a point'.

== Distribution and habitat ==
This wattle is found in south eastern Queensland in high rainfall areas, usually on coastal lowland sand plains, less than 40 km (25 mi) from the coast over a geographic range of around 400 km (250 mi), from Littabella National Park to the north of Bundaberg in the north down to around Burleigh Heads on the Gold coast in the south. It is scattered over eight LGAs with an estimated total area of 400 km^{2} (150 sq mi) of which less than 100 km^{2} (39 sq mi) is inhabited by the plant. It has an estimated total population of between 1,000 and 2,500 plants inhabiting approximately 26 individual locations. The highly fragmented distribution is a result of habitat destruction and clearing, mostly from urban development pressures.

== Conservation status ==
Acacia attenuata is listed as "vulnerable" under the Australian Government Environment Protection and Biodiversity Conservation Act 1999.

== See also ==
- List of Acacia species
