= Solanum carduiforme =

Conservation status
- Vulnerable (NCA)

Scientific classification
- Kingdom: Plantae
- Clade: Embryophytes
- Clade: Tracheophytes
- Clade: Angiosperms
- Clade: Eudicots
- Clade: Asterids
- Order: Solanales
- Family: Solanaceae
- Genus: Solanum
- Species: S. carduiforme

Binomial name
- Solanum carduiforme F.Muell.

Species of shrub

Solanum carduiforme is a rhizomatous perennial shrub which is endemic to Australia occurring in Queensland and Western Australia. S. carduiforme is the only known native solanum species to be dioecious.

== Distribution and habitat ==
Solanum carduiforme occurs from Boodjamulla National Park in North-Western Queensland and surrounding area as well as the Forsayth area. It also occurs in the Eastern Kimberley region of Western Australia. It has not been recorded in the Northern Territory.

== Conservation status ==
Solanum carduiforme is listed as "vulnerable" under the Queensland Nature Conservation Act 1992. It is not listed under the Australian Government Environment Protection and Biodiversity Conservation Act 1999.
