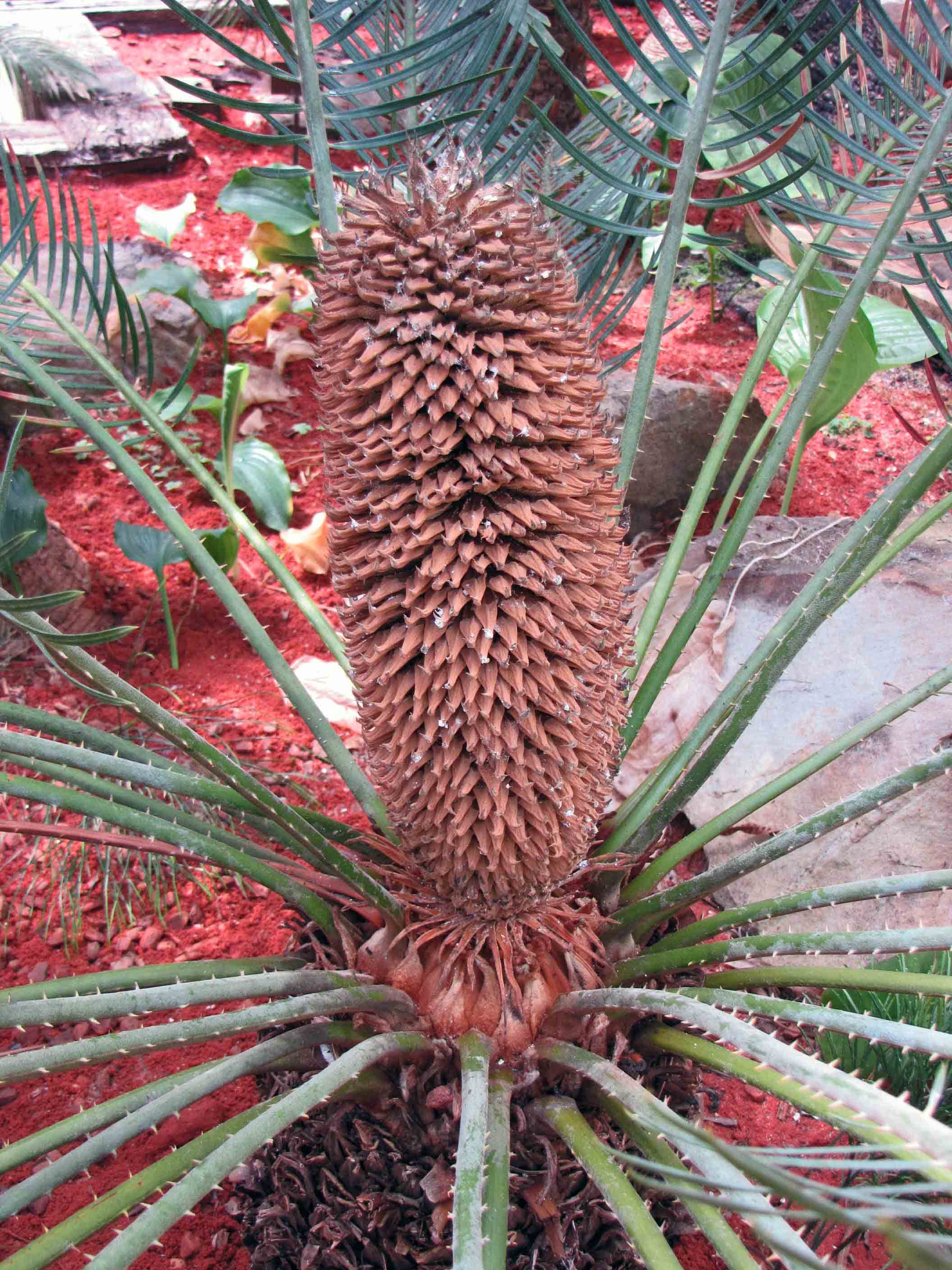

Conservation status
- Vulnerable (IUCN 3.1)

Scientific classification
- Kingdom: Plantae
- Clade: Tracheophytes
- Clade: Gymnospermae
- Division: Cycadophyta
- Class: Cycadopsida
- Order: Cycadales
- Family: Cycadaceae
- Genus: Cycas
- Species: C. cairnsiana

Binomial name
- Cycas cairnsiana F.Muell.

= Cycas cairnsiana =

Species of cycad

Cycas cairnsiana is a species of cycad in the genus Cycas, native to northern Australia in northern Queensland on the Newcastle Range.

The stems grow to 2–5 m tall and 12–16 cm diameter, with swollen base. The leaves are dark orange-brown tomentose on emerging, then glaucous blue-green and glabrous with age, 60–110 cm long, bowed, keeled, pinnate, with 180-220 leaflets, the leaflets 8–18 cm long and 2–4 mm wide. The petioles are 18–27 cm long, and armed with sharp spines.

The female cones are open, with sporophylls 16–21 cm long, with two to four ovules per sporophyll. The lamina is narrowly triangular, with toothed margins and an apical spine. The sarcotesta is yellow-brown with a waxy coating, the sclerotesta ovoid and flattened. The male cones are solitary, ovoid, 16–20 cm long and 7–10 cm diameter, brown, and with an upturned apical spine.

It is named after William Cairns, governor of Queensland from 1875–1877.

== Habitat ==
It grows in dry, rocky, and open woodland terrain on soils derived from granite. Its range is limited to the Newcastle Range of northeast Queensland, with seasonal rainfall of about 1350 mm. This cycad is a close relative of both Cycas couttsiana and Cycas platyphylla. The plants are remarkable for their intense blue colour, and their resilience to the seasonal extremes of their native range. Its conservation status is near-threatened.
