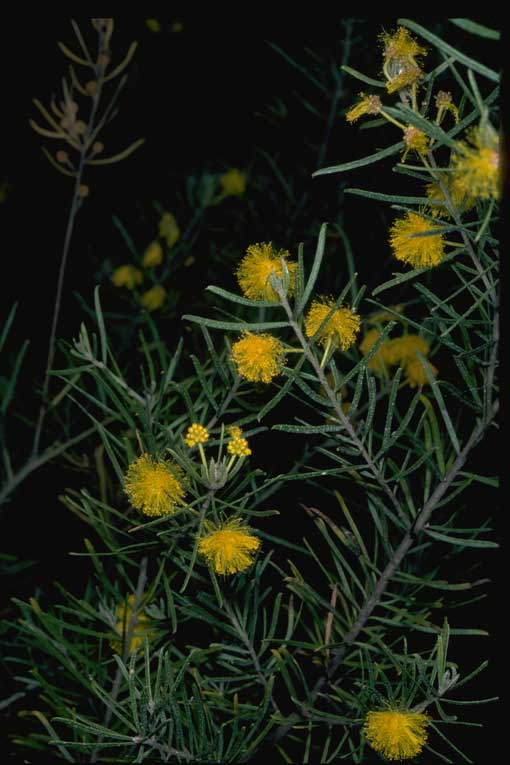
- In the Australian National Botanic Gardens

Conservation status
- Vulnerable (EPBC Act)

Scientific classification
- Kingdom: Plantae
- Clade: Embryophytes
- Clade: Tracheophytes
- Clade: Spermatophytes
- Clade: Angiosperms
- Clade: Eudicots
- Clade: Rosids
- Order: Fabales
- Family: Fabaceae
- Subfamily: Caesalpinioideae
- Clade: Mimosoid clade
- Genus: Acacia
- Species: A. lauta

Binomial name
- Acacia lauta Pedley

Synonyms
- Racosperma lautum (Pedley) Pedley; Acacia pilligaensis auct. non Maiden: Pedley, L. (1969)

= Acacia lauta =

Tara wattle

Species of legume

Acacia lauta, commonly known as Tara wattle, is a species of flowering plant in the family Fabaceae and is endemic to south-eastern Queensland, Australia. It is a sprawling shrub with branchlets usually covered with short, weak hairs, linear, curved or s-shaped phyllodes, spherical heads of golden yellow flowers and linear, glabrous pods.

== Description ==
Acacia lauta is a sprawling shrub that typically grows to a height of up to 2 m (6 ft 7 in) and has branchlets covered with short, weak, wide-spreading hairs. Its phyllodes are spreading to inclined or sometimes erect, linear, shallowly curved, sometimes most or all s-shaped, occasionally a few straight, flat, 20–40 mm (0.79–1.57 in) long, 1–2.5 mm (0.039–0.098 in) wide with an excentric point on the tip, and one to three veins and a slightly raised midrib. The flowers are arranged in a spherical head on a peduncle 3–7 mm (0.12–0.28 in) long, each head with 25 to 30 golden yellow flowers. Flowering occurs in August and September, and the pods are linear, glabrous, up to 60 mm (2.4 in) long and about 4 mm (0.16 in) wide. The seeds are 4.5–5.0 mm (0.18–0.20 in) long with a cup-shaped aril.

== Taxonomy ==
Acacia lauta was first formally described in 1980 by Leslie Pedley in the journal Austrobaileya from specimens collected near Weranga, about 16 km (9.9 mi) east of Tara in 1966.

== Distribution and habitat ==
Tara wattle is only known from the type locality where it grows in deep sand in low, open woodland between Tara and Inglewood on the Darling Downs in south-east Queensland.

== Conservation Status ==
Acacia lauta is listed as 'vulnerable' under the Australian Government Environment Protection and Biodiversity Conservation Act 1999 and the Queensland Government Nature Conservation Act 1992.

== See also ==
- List of Acacia species
