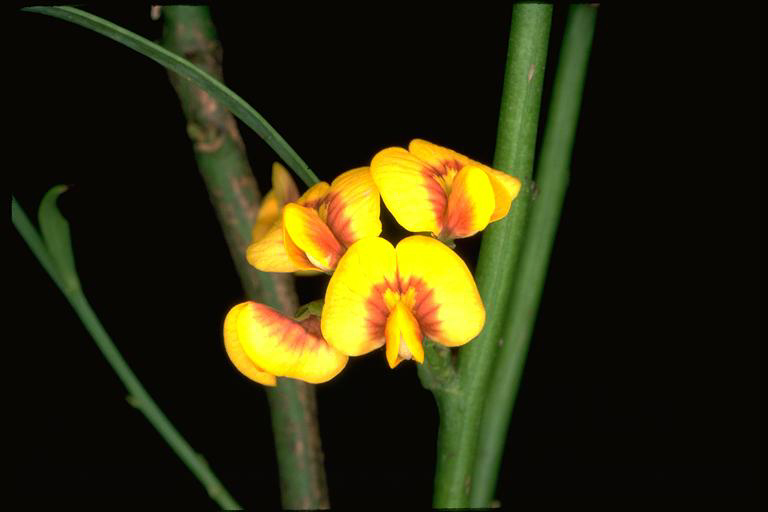
- In the Australian National Botanic Gardens

Conservation status
- Vulnerable (EPBC Act)

Scientific classification
- Kingdom: Plantae
- Clade: Tracheophytes
- Clade: Angiosperms
- Clade: Eudicots
- Clade: Rosids
- Order: Fabales
- Family: Fabaceae
- Subfamily: Faboideae
- Genus: Daviesia
- Species: D. discolor

Binomial name
- Daviesia discolor Pedley

= Daviesia discolor =

Species of flowering plant

Daviesia discolor is a species of flowering plant in the family Fabaceae and is endemic to Queensland. It is a glabrous, multi-stemmed shrub with linear, more or less sickle-shaped phyllodes, and yellow and dark red flowers.

== Description ==
Daviesia discolor is a glabrous, multi-stemmed shrub that typically grows to a height of up to 2 m (6 ft 7 in). Its leaves are reduced to linear to elliptic, more or less sickle-shaped phyllodes 40–160 mm (1.6–6.3 in) long, 4–11 mm (0.16–0.43 in) wide and striated, the lower surface a paler shade of green. The flowers are arranged in one or two groups of three to eight on a peduncle 1.5–6 mm (0.059–0.236 in) long, the rachis 1–4 mm (0.039–0.157 in) long, each flower on a pedicel 1.5–3.5 mm (0.059–0.138 in) long with narrowly oblong bracts about 1 mm (0.039 in) long at the base. The sepals are 3.5–4.0 mm (0.14–0.16 in) long and joined at the base, the two upper lobes joined for part of their length and the lower three triangular. The standard is broadly egg-shaped, 5.5–6.0 mm (0.22–0.24 in) long, 6.5–7.25 mm (0.256–0.285 in) wide and yellow with a red base, the wings 5.5–6.0 mm (0.22–0.24 in) long and yellow with a dull red base, and the keel 4.5 mm (0.18 in) long and pale green with a dull red tip. Flowering occurs from August and October and the fruit is a flattened, triangular pod 7.0–8.5 mm (0.28–0.33 in) long.

== Taxonomy and naming ==
Daviesia discolor was first formally described in 1977 by Leslie Pedley in the journal Austrobaileya. The specific epithet (discolor) means "variegated".

== Distribution and habitat ==
This species of pea grows in open forest on ridges, slopes and creek banks in the Blackdown Tableland National Park, near Biggenden and in the Carnarvon National Park.

== Conservation status ==
Daviesia discolor is listed as "vulnerable" under the Australian Government Environment Protection and Biodiversity Conservation Act 1999 and the Queensland Government Nature Conservation Act 1992.
