= Corymbia leptoloma =

Conservation status
- Near Threatened (IUCN 3.1)

- Vulnerable (EPBC Act)

Scientific classification
- Kingdom: Plantae
- Clade: Tracheophytes
- Clade: Angiosperms
- Clade: Eudicots
- Clade: Rosids
- Order: Myrtales
- Family: Myrtaceae
- Genus: Corymbia
- Species: C. leptoloma

Binomial name
- Corymbia leptoloma (Brooker & A.R.Bean) K.D.Hill & L.A.S.Johnson

Synonyms
- Eucalyptus leptoloma Brooker & A.R.Bean

Species of plant

Corymbia leptoloma, commonly known as yellowjacket or Paluma Range yellowjacket, is a species of tree that is endemic to Queensland. It has rough, tessellated bark on the trunk and branches, lance-shaped or curved adult leaves, flower buds in groups of seven and barrel-shaped, urn-shaped or shortened spherical fruit.

== Description ==
Corymbia leptoloma is a tree that typically grows to a height of 15 m (49 ft) and forms a lignotuber. It has thick, rough, grey-yellow, tessellated to flaky bark on the trunk and branches. Young plants and coppice regrowth have glossy green leaves that are paler on the lower surface, egg-shaped to lance-shaped, 110–200 mm (4.3–7.9 in) long, 50–100 mm (2.0–3.9 in) wide and petiolate. Adult leaves are dark glossy green on the upper surface, much paler below, lance-shaped to curved, 89–215 mm (3.5–8.5 in) long and 21–50 mm (0.83–1.97 in) wide, tapering to a petiole 14–36 mm (0.55–1.42 in) long. The flower buds are arranged on the ends of branchlets on a branched peduncle 6–26 mm (0.24–1.02 in) long, each branch of the peduncle with seven buds that are sessile or on pedicels up to 3 mm (0.12 in) long. Mature buds are oval, 6–8 mm (0.24–0.31 in) long and 5–6 mm (0.20–0.24 in) wide with a flattened to rounded operculum, sometimes with a central knob. The fruit is a woody barrel-shaped, urn-shaped or shortened spherical capsule 8–11 mm (0.31–0.43 in) long and wide with the valves enclosed in the fruit.

Corymbia leichhardtii sometimes occurs in the same vicinity and can be distinguished from C. leptoloma by its dull leaves that are a similar colour on both sides.

== Taxonomy and naming ==
Yellowjacket was first formally described in 1991 by Ian Brooker and Anthony Bean in the journal Austrobaileya, and was given the name Eucalyptus leptoloma from specimens Brooker collected near Paluma in 1989. In 1995, Ken Hill and Lawrie Johnson changed the name to Corymbia leptoloma.

== Distribution and habitat ==
Corymbia leptoloma is only known from a small area north west of Townsville where it is found in remnant areas of wet sclerophyll forest in association with Syncarpia glomulifera, Eucalyptus resinifera and Corymbia intermedia in gullies or on hillsides. It grows in coarse sandy soils derived from granite.

== Conservation status ==
This eucalypt is classified as "vulnerable" under the Australian Government Environment Protection and Biodiversity Conservation Act 1999 and the Queensland Government Nature Conservation Act 1992. The main threats to the species are habitat destruction and disturbance due to agriculture, mining and timber harvesting.

== See also ==
- List of Corymbia species
