= Solanum dunalianum =

Conservation status
- Vulnerable (EPBC Act)

Scientific classification
- Kingdom: Plantae
- Clade: Tracheophytes
- Clade: Angiosperms
- Clade: Eudicots
- Clade: Asterids
- Order: Solanales
- Family: Solanaceae
- Genus: Solanum
- Species: S. dunalianum

Binomial name
- Solanum dunalianum Gaudichaud-Beaupre, C.

Species of shrub

Solanum dunalianum is an erect rhizomatous perennial shrub which is endemic to Queensland, Australia.

== Distribution & habitat ==
In Australia, this species is only known to occur near Weipa on the Cape York Peninsula in Queensland, Australia. Outside of Australia it occurs in the biogeographic region of Malesia in New Guinea as well as on nearby islands. The habitat of collected specimens in Queensland are recorded as semi-deciduous rainforest, on red lateritic ridges.

== Conservation status ==
Solanum dunalianum is listed as "vulnerable" under the Queensland Nature Conservation Act 1992 and under the Australian Government Environment Protection and Biodiversity Conservation Act 1999.
