= Pomaderris crassifolia =

Scientific classification
- Kingdom: Plantae
- Clade: Tracheophytes
- Clade: Angiosperms
- Clade: Eudicots
- Clade: Rosids
- Order: Rosales
- Family: Rhamnaceae
- Genus: Pomaderris
- Species: P. crassifolia

Binomial name
- Pomaderris crassifolia N.G.Walsh & Coates

Species of shrub

Pomaderris crassifolia is a species of flowering plant in the family Rhamnaceae and is endemic to eastern Australia. It is a shrub with hairy young stems, egg-shaped or elliptic leaves, and clusters of cream-coloured or yellow flowers.

== Description ==
Pomaderris crassifolia is a shrub that typically grows to a height of 1–2 m (3 ft 3 in – 6 ft 7 in), its young stems woolly-hairy. The leaves are egg-shaped to elliptic, mostly 20–60 mm (0.79–2.36 in) long and 10–28 mm (0.39–1.10 in) wide on a petiole 5–10 mm (0.20–0.39 in) long with egg-shaped stipules 4.0–6.5 mm (0.16–0.26 in) long at the base. The upper surface of the leaves is glabrous and the lower surface densely covered with woolly hairs. The flowers are borne in clusters or twenty to more than fifty, the clusters 15–50 mm (0.59–1.97 in) long on the ends of branchlets and are cream-coloured and densely hairy. The floral cup is about 1 mm (0.039 in) in diameter and the sepals are 2.3–3.0 mm (0.091–0.118 in) long but there are usually no petals. Flowering occurs in August and September.

== Taxonomy ==
Pomaderris crassifolia was first formally described in 1997 by Neville Grant Walsh and Fiona Coates and the description was published in the journal Muelleria from specimens collected by Paul Irwin Forster in the McPherson Range in 1990.

== Distribution and habitat ==
This pomaderris grows in heathland, shrubland and woodland in rocky places on cliffs and mountains mainly near Warwick and in the McPherson Range in Queensland, with a disjunct population near Gloucester in New South Wales.
