= Cyperus semifertilis =

Scientific classification
- Kingdom: Plantae
- Clade: Tracheophytes
- Clade: Angiosperms
- Clade: Monocots
- Clade: Commelinids
- Order: Poales
- Family: Cyperaceae
- Genus: Cyperus
- Species: C. semifertilis

Binomial name
- Cyperus semifertilis S.T.Blake, 1939

Species of sedge

Cyperus semifertilis is a species of sedge that is native to parts of north eastern Australia.

== See also ==
- List of Cyperus species
