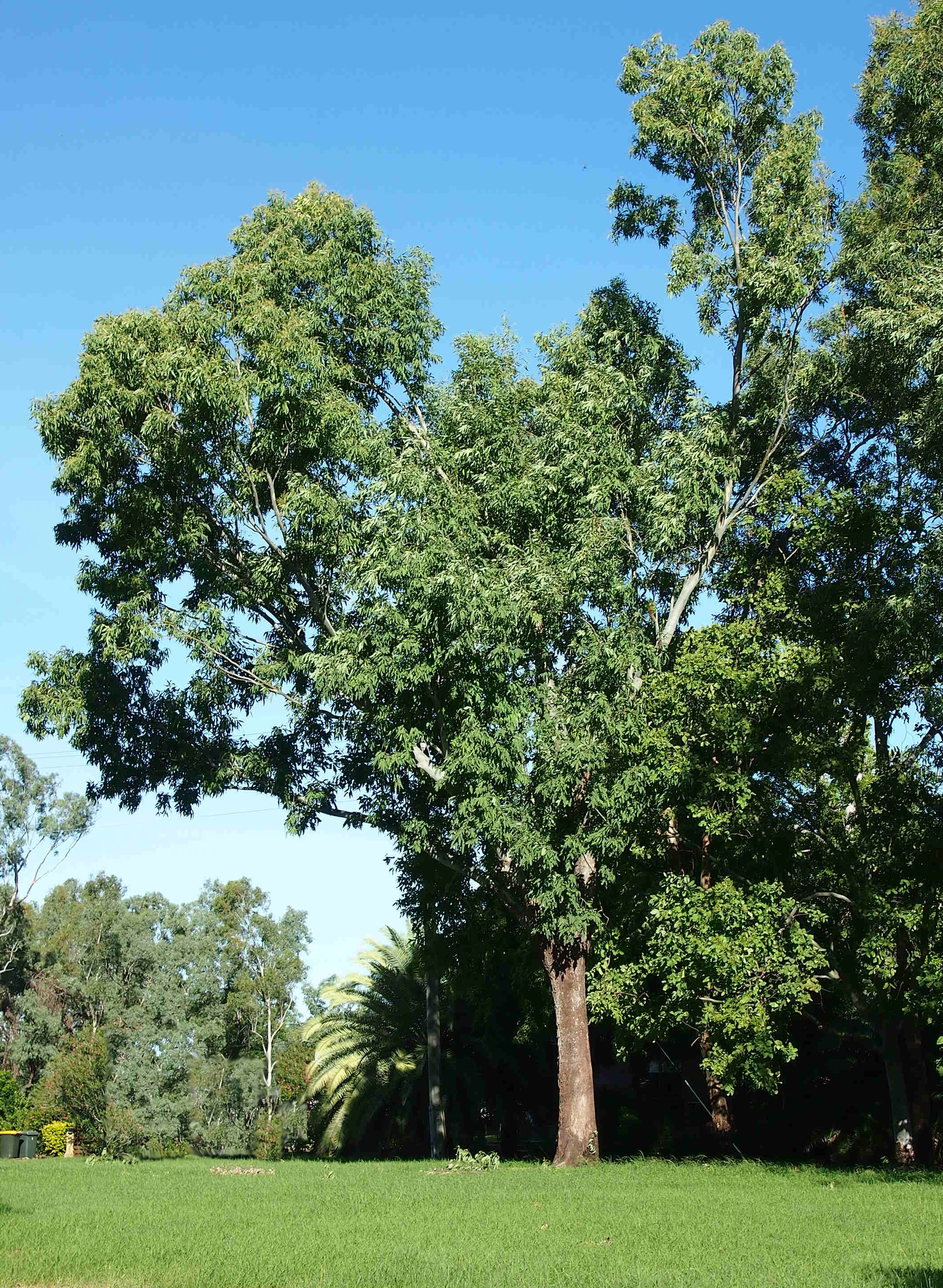

Conservation status
- Near Threatened (IUCN 3.1)

- Vulnerable (EPBC Act)

Scientific classification
- Kingdom: Plantae
- Clade: Tracheophytes
- Clade: Angiosperms
- Clade: Eudicots
- Clade: Rosids
- Order: Myrtales
- Family: Myrtaceae
- Genus: Eucalyptus
- Species: E. raveretiana

Binomial name
- Eucalyptus raveretiana F.Muell.

= Eucalyptus raveretiana =

Black ironbox

Species of eucalyptus

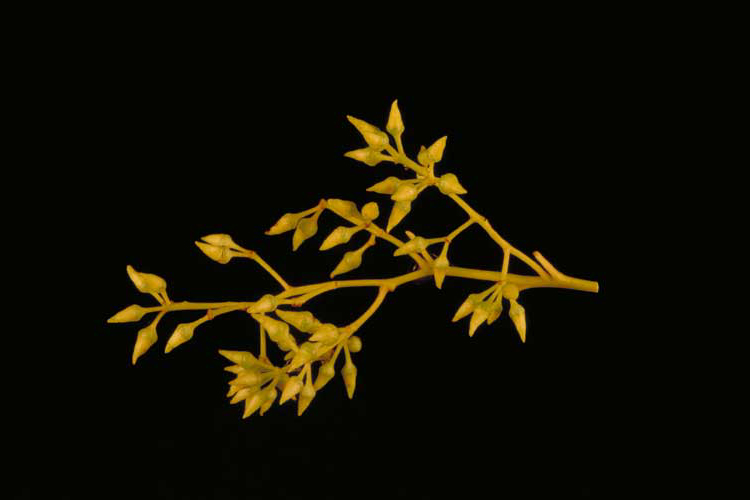
Flower buds

Eucalyptus raveretiana, commonly known as the black ironbox, is a species of small to medium-sized tree that is endemic to Queensland. It has rough, fibrous or flaky bark on the trunk and larger branches, smooth pale grey bark above, lance-shaped leaves, flower buds in groups of seven on a branched peduncle, white flowers and small, hemispherical fruit.

== Description ==
Eucalyptus raveretiana is a tree that typically grows to a height of 21–30 m (69–98 ft) and forms a lignotuber. It has thick, rough, flaky and fibrous, fissured dark grey bark on the trunk and larger branches, smooth grey to cream-coloured bark on branches thinner that 50 mm (2.0 in). Young plants and coppice regrowth have egg-shaped to broadly lance-shaped leaves that are paler on the lower surface, 50–125 mm (2.0–4.9 in) long and 17–55 mm (0.67–2.17 in) wide. Adult leaves are dull green on the upper surface, paler below, mostly lance-shaped, 80–172 mm (3.1–6.8 in) long and 10–35 mm (0.39–1.38 in) wide, tapering to a petiole 9–26 mm (0.35–1.02 in) long. The flower buds are arranged on the ends of branchlets in groups of seven on a branched peduncle 1–7 mm (0.039–0.276 in) long, the individual buds on pedicels 1–4 mm (0.039–0.157 in) long. Mature buds are oval, 3–4 mm (0.12–0.16 in) long and about 2 mm (0.079 in) wide with a conical operculum. Flowering occurs from December to March and the flowers are white. The fruit is a woody, hemispherical capsule about 2 mm (0.079 in) long and wide with the valves protruding.

== Taxonomy and naming ==
Eucalyptus raveretiana was first formally described in 1877 by Ferdinand von Mueller in his book Fragmenta phytographiae Australiae. The specific epithet honours a French public servant, C. Raveret-Wattel.

== Distribution and habitat ==
Black ironbox grows in forest and woodland along creeks and rivers between Rockhampton and Ayr and inland to the rivers north of Duaringa.

== Conservation status ==
This eucalypt is classified as "vulnerable" under the Australian Government Environment Protection and Biodiversity Conservation Act 1999 and the Queensland Government Nature Conservation Act 1992. The main threats to the species are habitat disturbance during timber harvesting operations and smothering by rubber vine (Cryptostegia grandiflora). The IUCN Red List assesses the species as Near Threatened.

== See also ==
- List of Eucalyptus species
