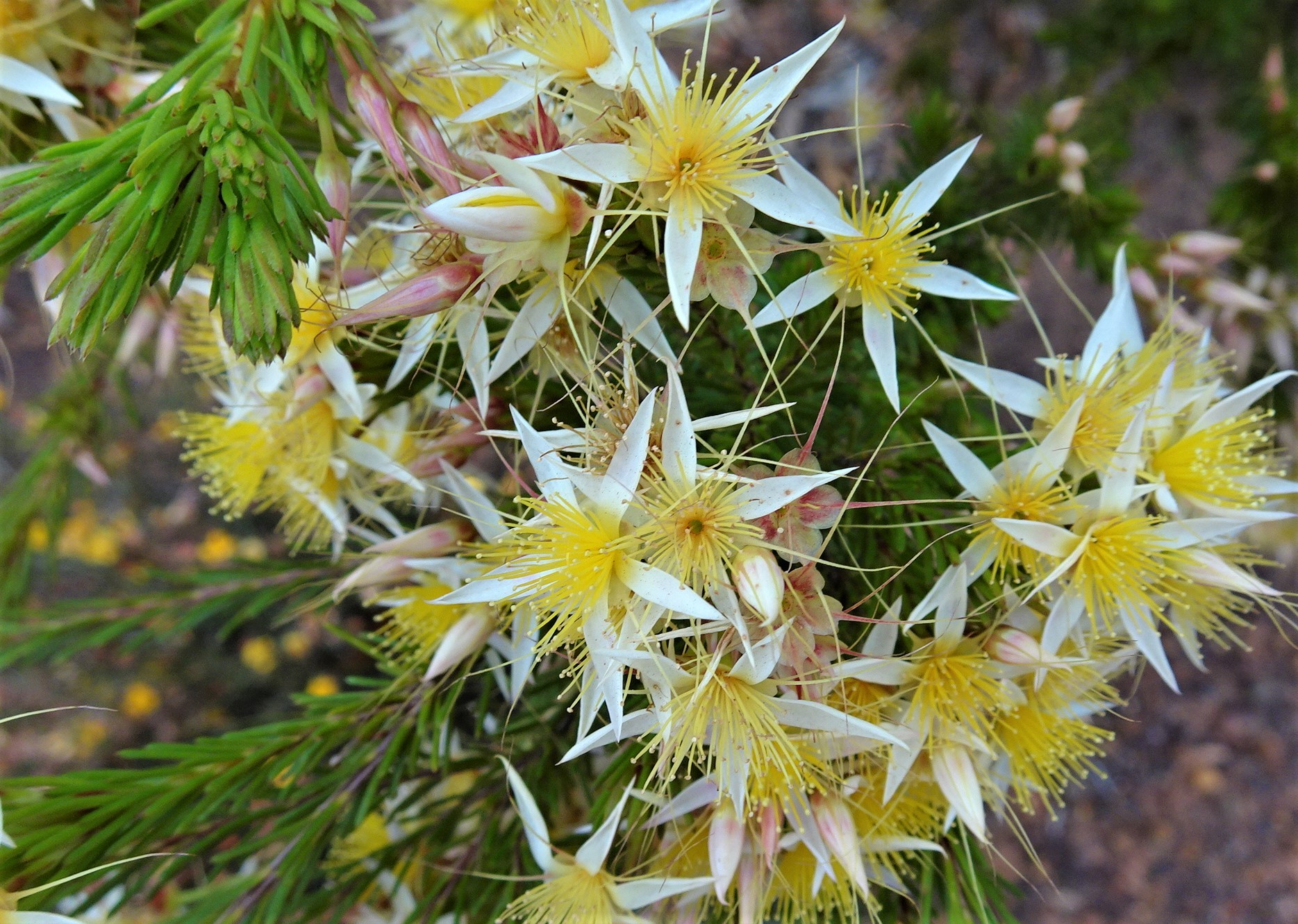

Conservation status
- Vulnerable (EPBC Act)

Scientific classification
- Kingdom: Plantae
- Clade: Tracheophytes
- Clade: Angiosperms
- Clade: Eudicots
- Clade: Rosids
- Order: Myrtales
- Family: Myrtaceae
- Genus: Calytrix
- Species: C. gurulmundensis

Binomial name
- Calytrix gurulmundensis Craven

= Calytrix gurulmundensis =

Species of flowering plant

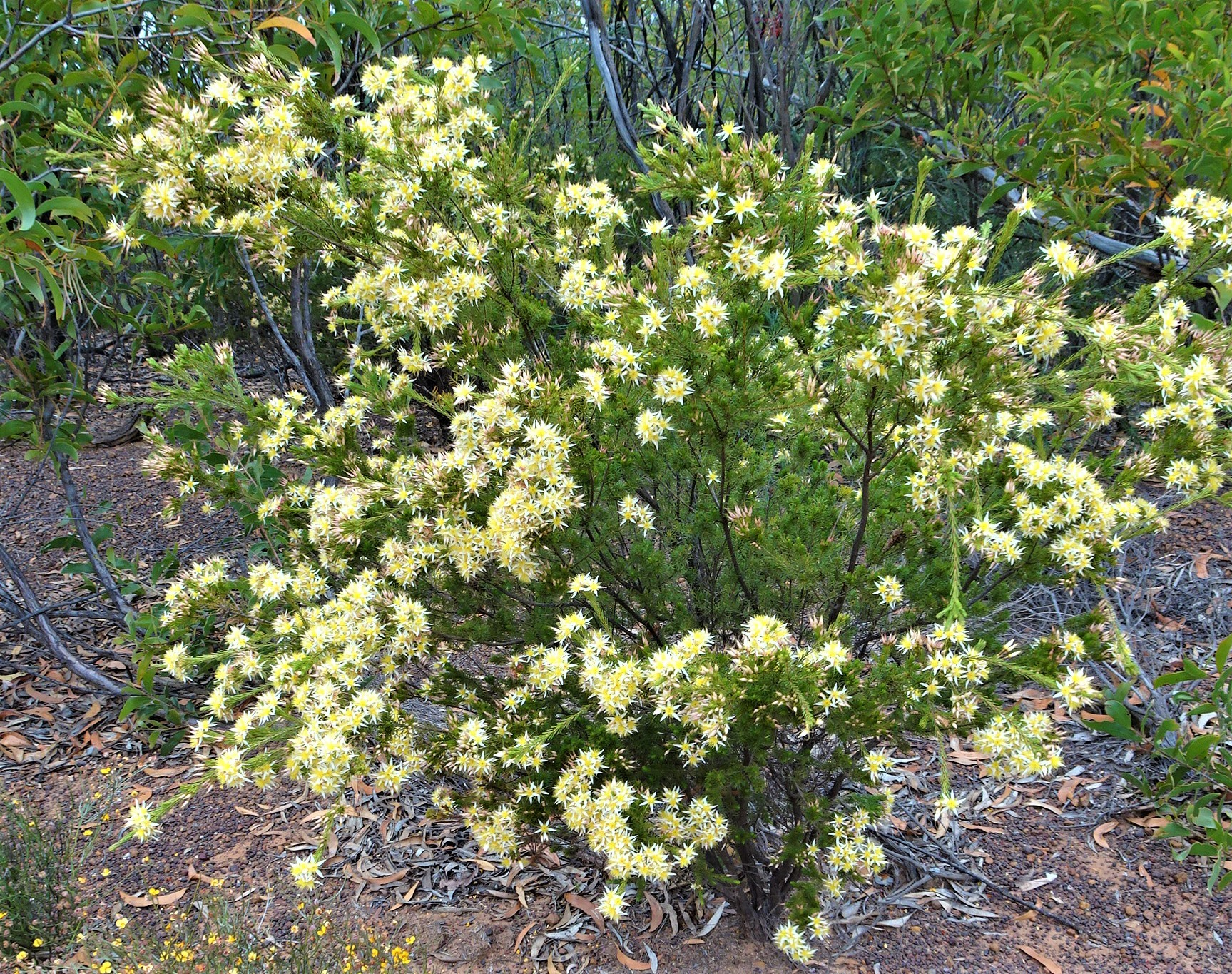
Habit near Gurulmundi

Calytrix gurulmundensis is a species of flowering plant in the myrtle family Myrtaceae and is endemic to Queensland. It is a mostly glabrous shrub with linear to narrowly elliptic leaves, and cream-coloured flowers with a yellow base, and about 60 to 70 yellow stamens in several rows.

== Description ==
Calytrix gurulmundensis is a mostly glabrous shrub that typically grows to a height of up to 2 m (6 ft 7 in). Its leaves are linear to narrowly elliptic, 4–11 mm (0.16–0.43 in) long, 0.6–1 mm (0.024–0.039 in) wide and sessile or on a petiole up to 1 mm (0.039 in) long. There are stipules 0.3 mm (0.012 in) long at the base of the petiole. The flowers are borne in clusters on a peduncle 7–10 mm (0.28–0.39 in) long with narrowly elliptic or elliptic lobes 5.5–8 mm (0.22–0.31 in) long. The floral tube is mostly free from the style, 9.5–12.5 mm (0.37–0.49 in) and has 10 ribs. The sepals are fused at the base, with more or less round or elliptic lobes 2.0–2.75 mm (0.079–0.108 in) long and 2.8–3.5 mm (0.11–0.14 in) long, with an awn long up to 15 mm (0.59 in) long. The petals are cream-coloured with a yellow base, lance-shaped to narrowly elliptic, 8.75–11 mm (0.344–0.433 in) long and about 2.75 mm (0.108 in) wide, and there are about 60 to 70 yellow stamens in two rows. Flowering occurs from July to October.

== Taxonomy ==
Calytrix gurulmundensis was first formally described in 1987 by Lyndley Craven in the journal Brunonia from specimens collected 13 km (8.1 mi) west of Gurulmundi in 1975.

== Distribution and habitat ==
This species of Calytrix grows in open shrubland in gravelly soil and on sandstone in the Guluguba-Chinchilla district of south-eastern Queensland.

== Conservation status ==
Calytrix gurulmundensis is listed as "vulnerable" under the Australian Government Environment Protection and Biodiversity Conservation Act 1999 and the Queensland Government Nature Conservation Act 1992.
