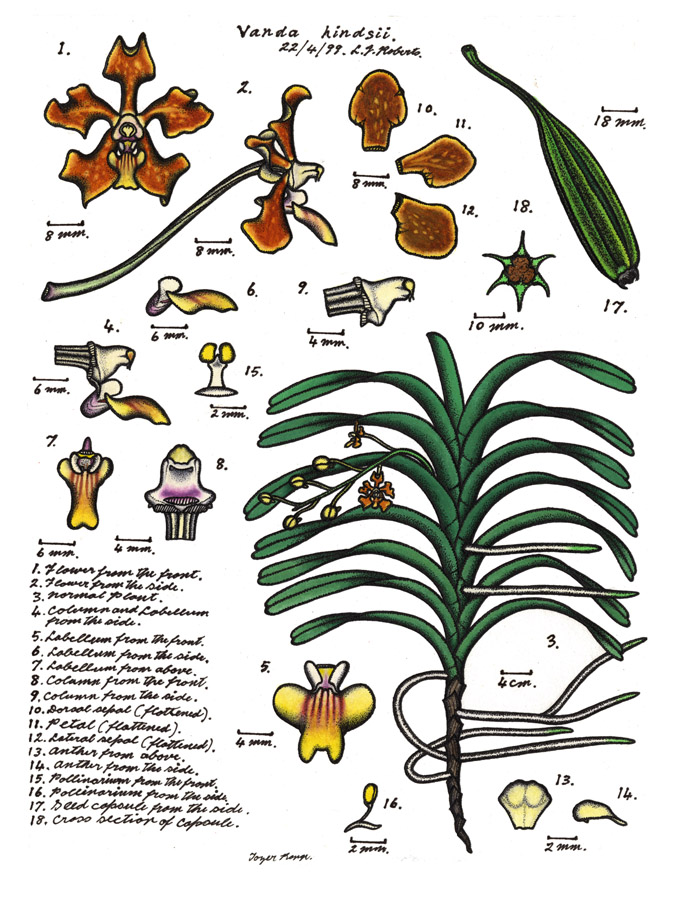
- Illustration by Lewis Roberts

Conservation status
- Vulnerable (EPBC Act)

- Least Concern (IUCN 3.1)

Scientific classification
- Kingdom: Plantae
- Clade: Tracheophytes
- Clade: Angiosperms
- Clade: Monocots
- Order: Asparagales
- Family: Orchidaceae
- Subfamily: Epidendroideae
- Genus: Vanda
- Species: V. hindsii

Binomial name
- Vanda hindsii Lindl.

Synonyms
- Vanda truncata J.J.Sm.; Vanda whiteana D.A.Herb. & S.T.Blake

= Vanda hindsii =

Native strap orchid

Species of orchid

Vanda hindsii, commonly known as the native strap orchid or the Cape York vanda, is a large epiphytic or lithophytic clump-forming orchid. It has thick, white, cord-like roots, branching stems, many thick, leathery, strap-like leaves and between three and seven shiny brown flowers with greenish to yellow markings and a white labellum. This orchid occurs in New Guinea and tropical North Queensland.

== Description ==
Vanda hindsii is an epiphytic or lithophytic herb that forms large, coarse clumps with thick, white, cord-like roots and branching stems up to 1 metre (3.3 ft) long. There are many thick, leathery, glossy, strap-like leaves 200–400 millimetres (7.9–16 in) long and 30–40 millimetres (1.2–1.6 in) wide arranged in two ranks along the stems. Between three and seven brown resupinate flowers with greenish to yellowish markings, 30–35 millimetres (1.2–1.4 in) long and wide are arranged on a stiff flowering stem 100–200 millimetres (3.9–7.9 in) long. The sepals are 14–16 millimetres (0.55–0.63 in) long and 8–10 millimetres (0.31–0.39 in) wide, the petals about the same length but narrower. The labellum is white, 12–14 millimetres (0.47–0.55 in) long and 7–8 millimetres (0.28–0.31 in) wide with three lobes. The side lobes are erect and curved and the middle lobe is about 7 millimetres (0.28 in) long with a notched tip and a spur about 4 millimetres (0.16 in) long. Flowering mainly occurs from November to March.

== Taxonomy and naming ==
Vanda hindsii was first formally described in 1843 by John Lindley and the description was published in the London Journal of Botany from a specimen collected by Richard Brinsley Hinds. The specific epithet (hindsii) honours the collector of the type specimen.

== Distribution and habitat ==
The native strap orchid grows on trees and rocks in humid forests. It only occurs in New Guinea, the Solomon Islands and Queensland where it is found in the Carron Valley, Iron Range and McIlwraith Range.

== Conservation status ==
The global assessment of the conservation status of this orchid in the IUCN Red List of Threatened Species is "least concern", but it is listed as "vulnerable" in Australia under the Australian Government Environment Protection and Biodiversity Conservation Act 1999 and the Queensland Government Nature Conservation Act 1992.
