= Acacia barakulensis =

Waajie wattle

Scientific classification
- Kingdom: Plantae
- Clade: Tracheophytes
- Clade: Angiosperms
- Clade: Eudicots
- Clade: Rosids
- Order: Fabales
- Family: Fabaceae
- Subfamily: Caesalpinioideae
- Clade: Mimosoid clade
- Genus: Acacia
- Species: A. barakulensis

Binomial name
- Acacia barakulensis Pedley
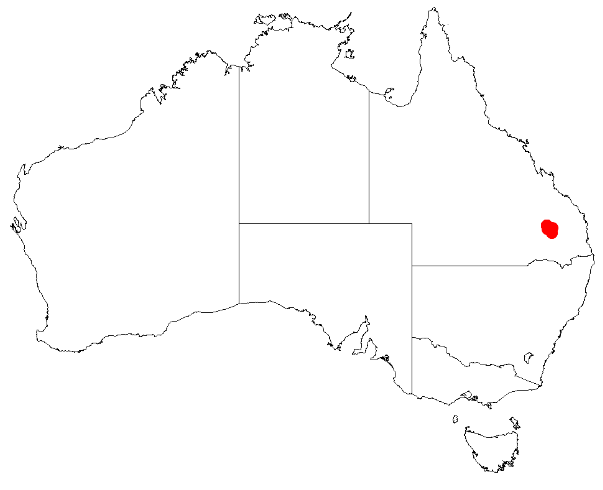
- Occurrence data from AVH

Synonyms
- Acacia barakulensis Pedley ex Lithgow nom. inval.; Acacia sp. (Barakula L.A.Nielsen 15); Racosperma barakulense (Pedley) Pedley

Species of shrub

Acacia barakulensis, commonly known as waajie wattle, is a species of flowering plant in the family Fabaceae and is endemic to a small area of Queensland. It is a shrub with slender to erect, more or less straight phyllodes round in cross section, spherical heads of golden yellow flowers arranged singly in leaf axils, and linear, papery pods up to 40 mm (1.6 in) long.

== Description ==
Acacia barakulensis is a shrub that typically grows to a height of 2–3 m (6 ft 7 in – 9 ft 10 in) and has slightly sticky branchlets with a few hairs. Its phyllodes are more or less crowded, ascending to erect, slender, straight and round in cross section, 10–22 mm (0.39–0.87 in) long, 0.6–1 mm (0.024–0.039 in) wide and mostly glabrous. The flowers are borne in a spherical head in axils on a peduncle 6–10 mm (0.24–0.39 in) long, each head with 25 to 35 golden yellow flowers. Flowering occurs from June to September, and the pods are linear, papery, glabrous and slightly sticky, sometimes slightly constricted between the seeds, up to 40 mm (1.6 in) long and 4 mm (0.16 in) wide with oblong seeds, 3.7–4.2 mm (0.15–0.17 in) long with a club-shaped aril.

== Taxonomy ==
Acacia barakulensis was first formally described in 1999 by Leslie Pedley from specimens collected in the Barakula State Forest in 1971. The specific epithet (barakulensis) refers to Barakula, the only known locality of occurrence of the species.

== Distribution and habitat ==
Waajie wattle is restricted to the Barakula State Forest north of Chinchilla, where it grows in sandy soils in eucalypt communities.

== Conservation status ==
Acacia barakulensis is listed as "vulnerable" under the Queensland Government Nature Conservation Act 1992.

== See also ==
- List of Acacia species
