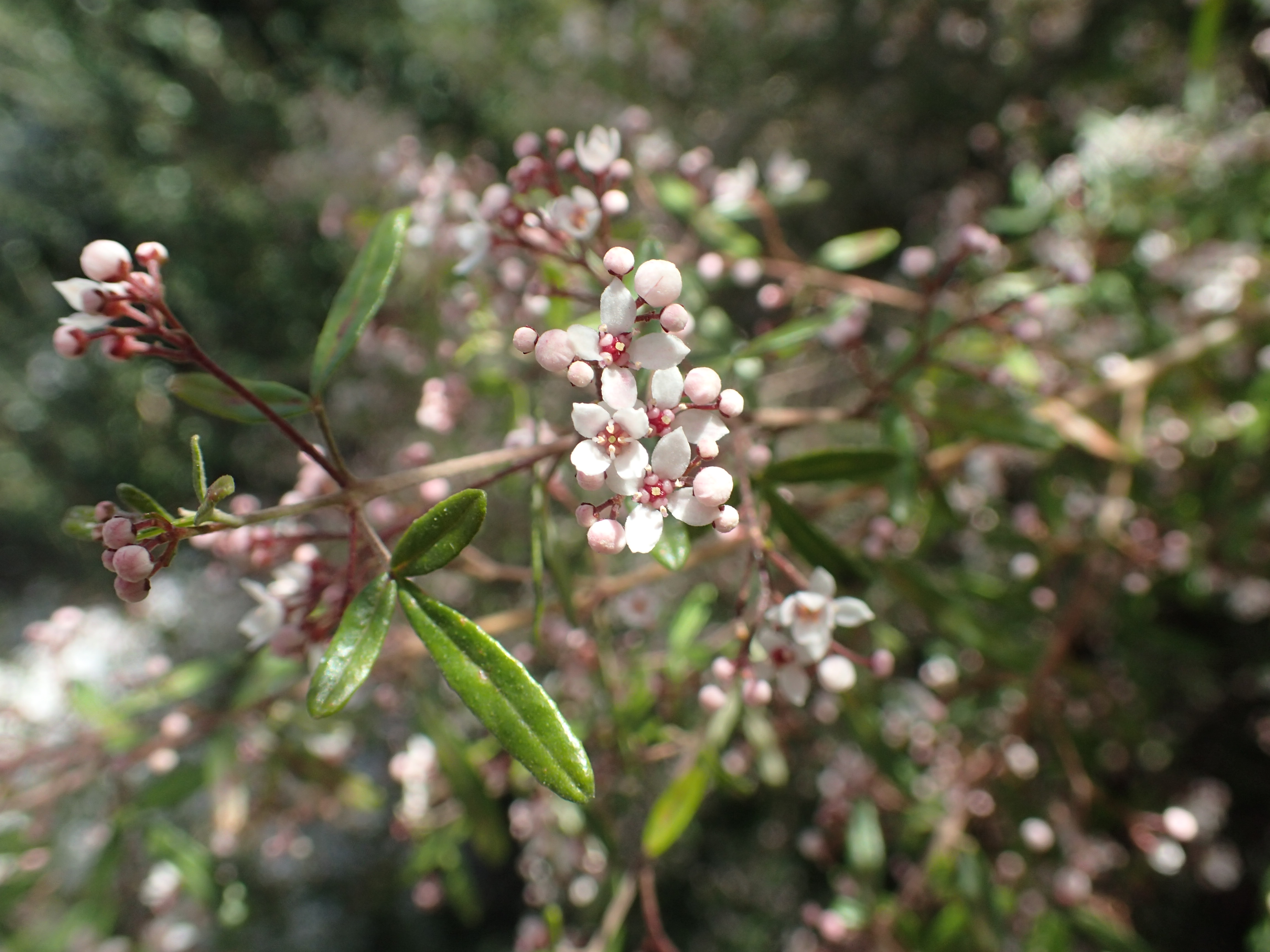
- In the Australian National Botanic Gardens

Conservation status
- Vulnerable (EPBC Act)

Scientific classification
- Kingdom: Plantae
- Clade: Tracheophytes
- Clade: Angiosperms
- Clade: Eudicots
- Clade: Rosids
- Order: Sapindales
- Family: Rutaceae
- Genus: Zieria
- Species: Z. collina

Binomial name
- Zieria collina C.T.White

= Zieria collina =

Hill zieria

Species of flowering plant

Zieria collina commonly known as hill zieria, is a plant in the citrus family, Rutaceae and is endemic to a small area in south-east Queensland. It is a large, spreading shrub with leaves composed of three leaflets, and small flowers with four white petals.

== Description ==
Zieria collina is a spreading shrub with velvety hairs and which grows to a height of 3 m (10 ft). The leaves are arranged in opposite pairs and are composed of elliptic to lance-shaped leaflets 12–20 mm (0.5–0.8 in) long and 3–5 mm (0.1–0.2 in) wide. The upper surface of the leaflets is a darker shade of green than the lower surface and usually has a few hairs and tubercles while the lower surface in densely covered with velvety hairs. The leaf stalk is 1–8 mm (0.04–0.3 in) long. The flowers are bright white, about 7 mm (0.3 in) in diameter and are arranged in groups of 15 to 30 in leaf axils and the groups are usually longer than the leaves. The sepal have four lobes and there are four petals. In common with other zierias, there are only four stamens. Flowering mainly occurs from August to October but flowers are often seen at other times. Fruit opens about six weeks after flowering.

== Taxonomy and naming ==
Zieria collina was first formally described in 1932 by Cyril Tenison White and the description was published in Proceedings of the Royal Society of Queensland. The specific epithet (collina) is a Latin word meaning "of a hill". New South Wales Flora Online features a photo of the Herbarium Sheet.

== Distribution and habitat ==
This zieria grows near the edge of rainforest on and near Tamborine Mountain. It sometimes forms dense thickets and seems to respond to disturbance.

== Conservation ==
Zieria collina is classified as "vulnerable" under the Commonwealth Government Environment Protection and Biodiversity Conservation Act 1999 (EPBC) Act. The main threat to its survival is invasion by introduced species, especially lantana (Lantana camara).
