= Acacia guymeri =

Scientific classification
- Kingdom: Plantae
- Clade: Tracheophytes
- Clade: Angiosperms
- Clade: Eudicots
- Clade: Rosids
- Order: Fabales
- Family: Fabaceae
- Subfamily: Caesalpinioideae
- Clade: Mimosoid clade
- Genus: Acacia
- Species: A. guymeri

Binomial name
- Acacia guymeri Tindale
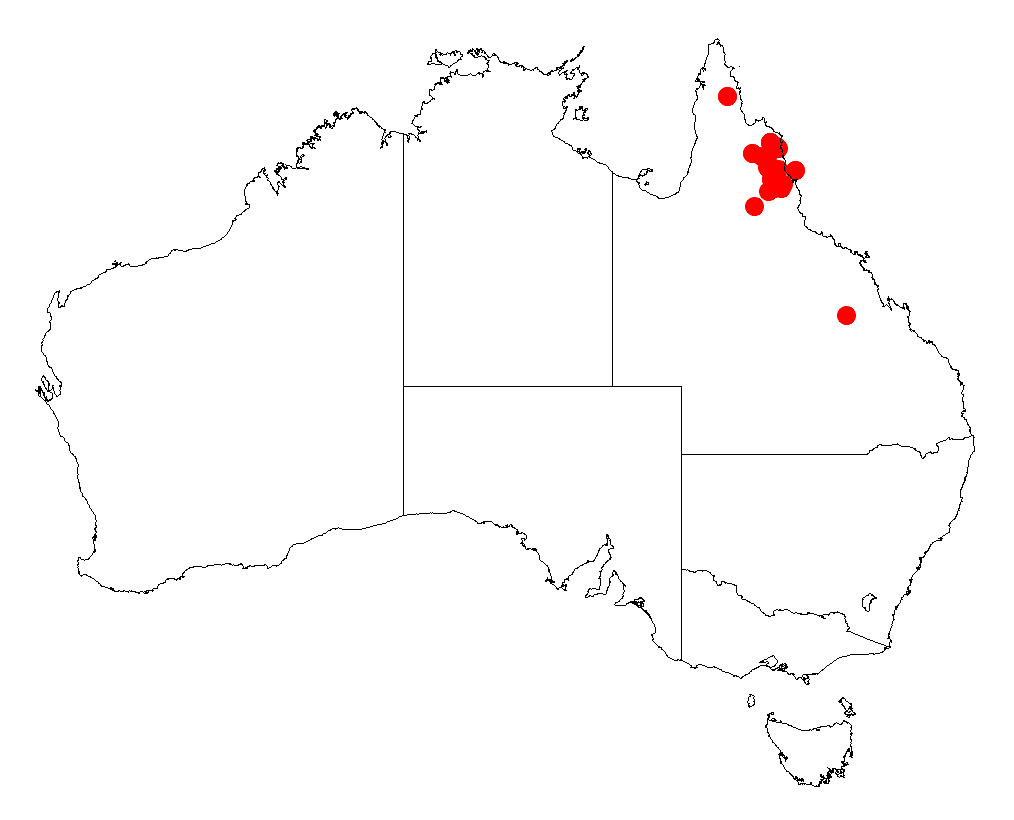
- Occurrence data from AVH

Synonyms
- Racosperma guymeri Pedley

Species of legume

Acacia guymeri is a species of flowering plant in the family Fabaceae and is endemic to northern Queensland, Australia. It is an open, single stemmed or multistemmed shrub with smooth, silver-grey bark, linear, glabrous, thinly leathery phyllodes, spikes of pale yellow or golden yellow flowers and linear subwoody, glabrous pods.

== Description ==
Acacia guymeri is an open, single or multistemmed shrub that typically grows to a height of 1–2.5 m (3 ft 3 in – 8 ft 2 in) and has smooth, silver-grey bark. Its branchlets are red-brown or yellowish red, resinous and covered with minute scales. The phyllodes are linear, more or less straight or slightly curved, 80–160 mm (3.1–6.3 in) long, 1–2 mm (0.039–0.079 in) wide, thinly leathery, glabrous and with a prominently raised midvein and one or two less prominent veins on each side. The flowers are pale yellow or golden yellow and borne in spikes 9–13 mm (0.35–0.51 in) long. Flowering has been recorded in January, and the pods are linear, flat, 40–90 mm (1.6–3.5 in) long, subwoody and glabrous, with prominent yellowish margins. The seeds are oblong to broadly oblong, 3–4 mm (0.12–0.16 in) long and yellowish brown, later darker.

== Taxonomy ==
Acacia guymeri was first formally described in 1978 by Mary Tindale in the journal Telopea from specimens collected 36 km (22 mi) west-north-west of Mount Carbine on the Laura road, by Gordon P. Guymer in 1977. The specific epithet (guymeri) honours the collector of the type specimens, who took photographs of and collected further material of this Acacia from the original site where the species was discovered.

== Distribution and habitat ==
This species of wattle grows in poor soil on rocky ridges and in disturbed areas and in Eucalyptus woodland from west of Cooktown in the north extending down the western edge of the Great Dividing Range to near Mount Surprise covering a total area of around 29,150 km^{2} (11,250 sq mi).

== Conservation status ==
Acacia guymeri was previously listed as "vulnerable" under the Australian Government Environment Protection and Biodiversity Conservation Act 1999 but deleted from the vulnerable category from 23/05/2013. It is listed as "near threatened" under the Queensland Government Nature Conservation Act 1992.

== See also ==
- List of Acacia species
