= Daviesia quoquoversus =

Scientific classification
- Kingdom: Plantae
- Clade: Tracheophytes
- Clade: Angiosperms
- Clade: Eudicots
- Clade: Rosids
- Order: Fabales
- Family: Fabaceae
- Subfamily: Faboideae
- Genus: Daviesia
- Species: D. quoquoversus

Binomial name
- Daviesia quoquoversus Crisp

Species of legume

Daviesia quoquoversus is a species of flowering plant in the family Fabaceae and is endemic to the Blackdown Tableland in the Central Highlands of Queensland. It is a diffuse, spreading shrub with hairy, arching branchlets, crowded egg-shaped or heart-shaped, sharply-pointed phyllodes and yellow and red flowers.

== Description ==
Daviesia quoquoversus is a diffuse, spreading shrub that typically grows to a height of up to 2 m (6 ft 7 in) and has arching branchlets covered with stiff hairs that are bent or twisted in every direction. Its phyllodes are crowded, egg-shaped with a heart-shaped base, 6–9 mm (0.24–0.35 in) long and 2.5–6 mm (0.098–0.236 in) wide with a long, tapering, sharply-pointed tip. The flowers are usually arranged singly in leaf axils on a peduncle 0.5–1.1 mm (0.020–0.043 in) long, each flower on a pedicel 3.1–6.2 mm (0.12–0.24 in) long with broadly egg-shaped bracts with the narrower end towards the base, 0.3–0.5 mm (0.012–0.020 in) long, at the base of the pedicel. The sepals are 2.8–3.1 mm (0.11–0.12 in) long and joined at the base with lobes about 1 mm (0.039 in) long. The standard petal is elliptic with a notched centre, 5.5–6.0 mm (0.22–0.24 in) long, about 6 mm (0.24 in) wide, and yellow with red markings. The wings are 5.5–6 mm (0.22–0.24 in) long and the keel slightly shorter. Flowering occurs from July to September and the fruit is a flattened triangular pod 9–10 mm (0.35–0.39 in) long.

== Taxonomy ==
Daviesia quoquoversus was first formally described in 1990 by Michael Crisp in Australian Systematic Botany from specimens collected on the Blackdown Tableland in 1971. The specific epithet (quoquoversus) means "in every direction".

== Distribution and habitat ==
This daviesia grows with shrubs and grasses in open forest and is restricted to the Blackdown Tableland.

== Conservation status ==
Daviesia quoquoversus is listed as "vulnerable" under the Queensland Government Nature Conservation Act 1992.
