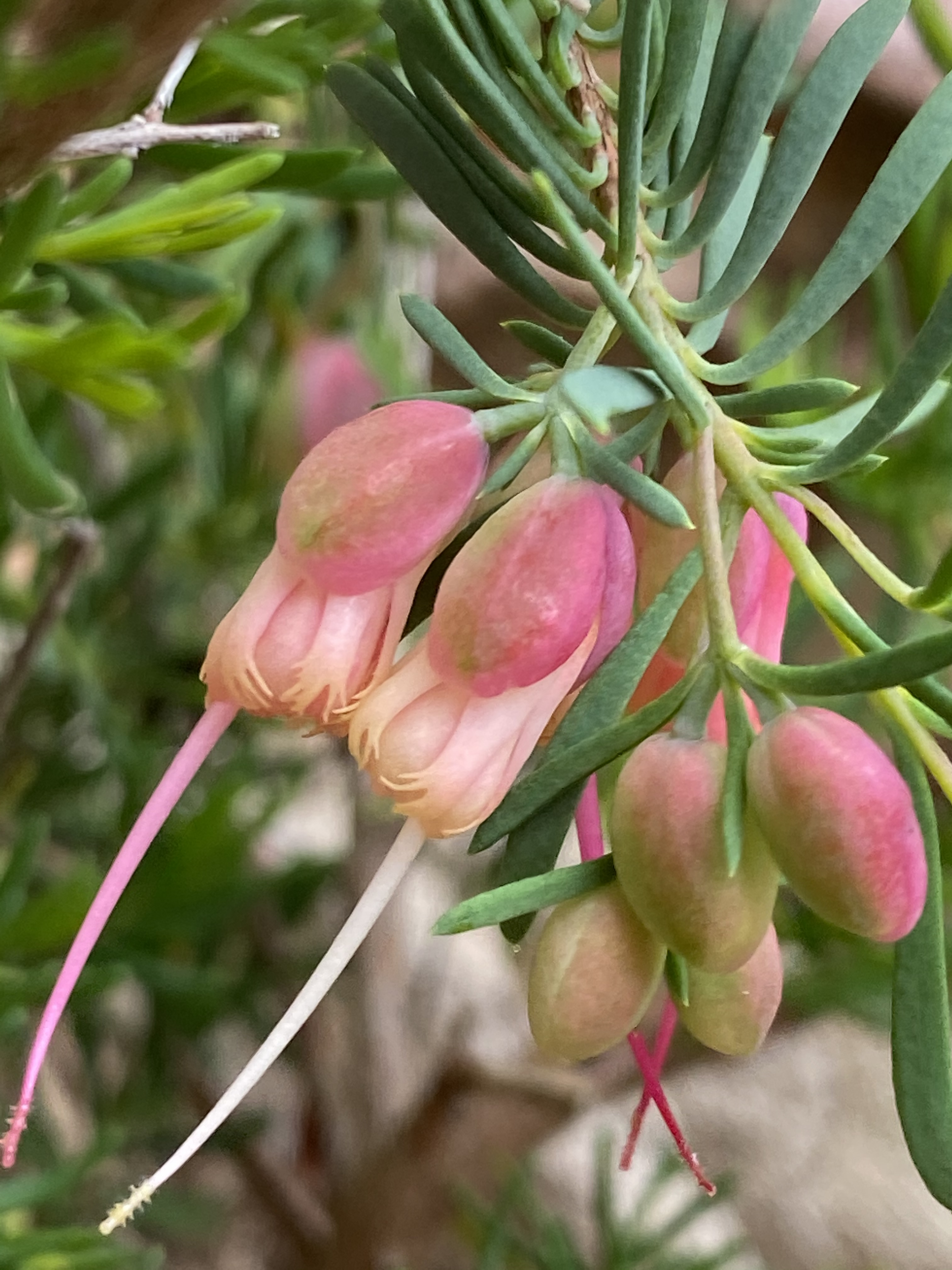

Conservation status
- Vulnerable (EPBC Act)

Scientific classification
- Kingdom: Plantae
- Clade: Tracheophytes
- Clade: Angiosperms
- Clade: Eudicots
- Clade: Rosids
- Order: Myrtales
- Family: Myrtaceae
- Genus: Homoranthus
- Species: H. porteri

Binomial name
- Homoranthus porteri C.T.White Craven & S.R.Jones
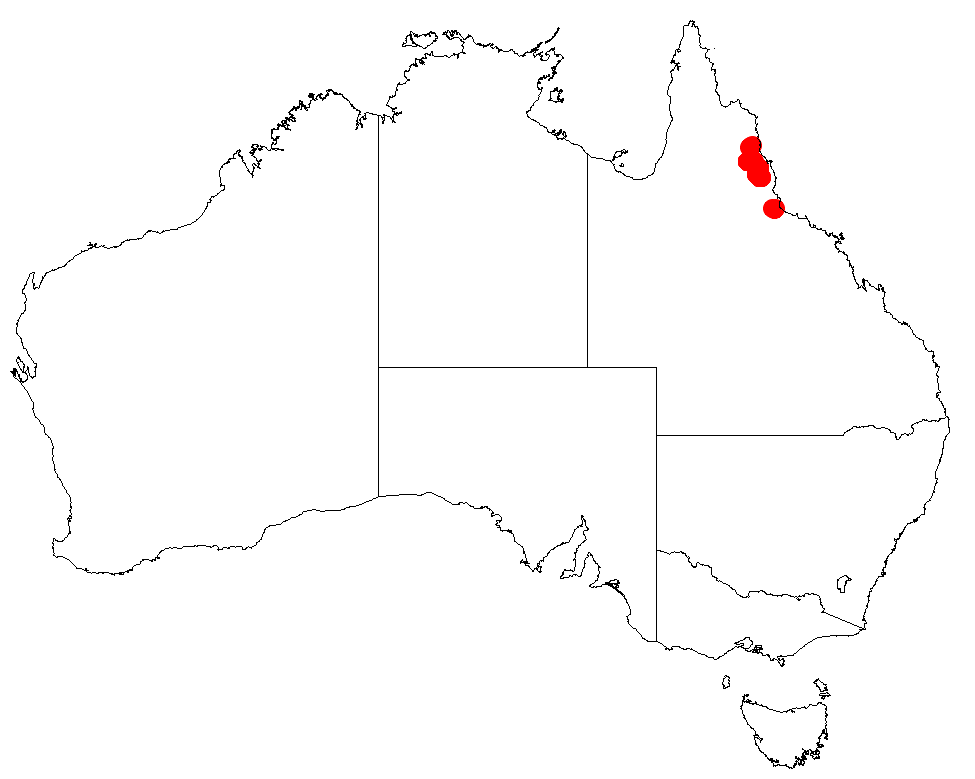
- Occurrence data from AVH

Synonyms
- Darwinia porteri C.T.White

= Homoranthus porteri =

Species of flowering plant

Homoranthus porteri is a plant in the myrtle family Myrtaceae, and is endemic to a small area in northern Queensland, Australia. It is an upright shrub with creamy-white to red pendulous flowers in pairs on a short stalk with red bracts and small linear leaves.

== Description ==
Homoranthus porteri is a shrub growing to 2.5 m (8 ft 2 in) high. The leaves are a dull green, small, slightly smooth, about 12 mm (0.47 in) long, 1.5 mm (0.059 in) wide and arranged spirally in pairs at right angles to the previous pair on the branches. The small flowers hang pendulous in pairs on a stalk from the leaf axils. The flowers have red bracts and a style about 1.5 cm (0.59 in) long that protrudes from the centre of the flower petals. Flowering occurs mostly in autumn but may flower and fruit sporadically throughout the year.

== Taxonomy and naming ==
This species was first formally described in 1931 by C.T. White who gave it the name of Darwinia porteri and published the description in Proceedings of the Royal Society of Queensland. In 1991, Lyndley Craven and S.R.Jones changed the name to Homoranthus porteri. The specific epithet (porteri) honours Charles Porter who collected the type specimen.

== Distribution and habitat ==
Homoranthus porteri is restricted to an area between Mareeba and Ravenshoe, Queensland. It is usually found adjacent to woodland, scree slopes or heath, growing on shallow sandstone soils and rock outcrops.

== Conservation ==
Homoranthus porteri is listed as "vulnerable" under the Australian Government EPBC Act. This species is uncommon with a restricted distribution, ROTAP conservation code 2V, Briggs and Leigh (1996).
