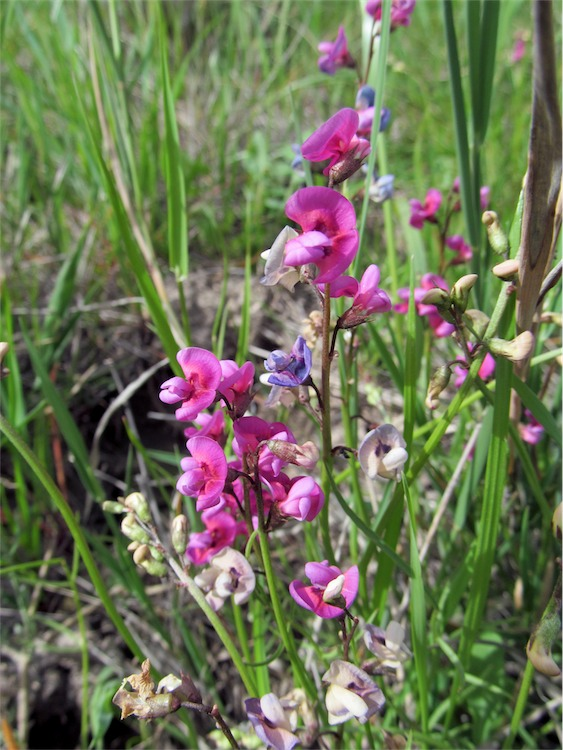
- Near Collingullie

Conservation status
- Vulnerable (EPBC Act)

Scientific classification
- Kingdom: Plantae
- Clade: Tracheophytes
- Clade: Angiosperms
- Clade: Eudicots
- Clade: Rosids
- Order: Fabales
- Family: Fabaceae
- Subfamily: Faboideae
- Genus: Swainsona
- Species: S. murrayana

Binomial name
- Swainsona murrayana Wawra

Synonyms
- Swainsona morrisiana J.M.Black; Swainsona murrayana subsp. eciliata A.T.Lee; Swainsona murrayana Wawra subsp. murrayana

= Swainsona murrayana =

Slender Darling-pea

Species of plant

Swainsona murrayana, commonly known as slender Darling-pea or slender Darling pea, is a species of flowering plant in the family Fabaceae and is endemic to south-eastern mainland Australia. It is a prostrate, low-growing or erect perennial herb, with imparipinnate leaves with 3 to 11 linear to elliptic leaflets and racemes of 3 to 11 pink or purple flowers.

== Description ==
Swainsona murrayana is a prostrate, low-growing or erect perennial herb that typically grows up to 25 cm (9.8 in) tall and is densely hairy. The leaves are imparipinnate, mostly 5–10 mm (0.20–0.39 in) long with 3 to 11 linear to elliptic leaflets, the side leaflets mostly 5–30 mm (0.20–1.18 in) long and 1–2 mm (0.039–0.079 in) wide with a stipule 1–5 mm (0.039–0.197 in) long at the base of the petiole. The flowers are pink or purple, arranged in racemes of 3 to 11, on a peduncle 0.5–2 mm (0.020–0.079 in) wide, each flower about 10 mm (0.39 in) long on a pedicel 3–5 mm (0.12–0.20 in) long. The sepals are joined at the base to form a tube about 2.5 mm (0.098 in) long, with teeth shorter than the tube. The standard petal is about 10 mm (0.39 in) long and 7–8 mm (0.28–0.31 in) wide, the wings 8–10 mm (0.31–0.39 in) long and the keel 7–9 mm (0.28–0.35 in) long and 2–3 mm (0.079–0.118 in) broad. Flowering occurs from August to November, and the fruit is a narrowly elliptic pod 20–65 mm (0.79–2.56 in) long with the remains of the style about 4 mm (0.16 in) long.

== Taxonomy and naming ==
Swainsona murrayana was first formally described in 1881 by Heinrich Wawra von Fernsee in Österreichische botanische Zeitschrift from specimens collected near the Murray River.

== Distribution ==
Slender Darling-pea is usually found in seasonally wet areas and near lakes and is found on the western slopes and plains of New South Wales, in Northern and western Victoria and southern Queensland with an outlier in South Australia.

== Conservation status ==
Swainsona murrayana is listed as "vulnerable" under the Australian Government Environment Protection and Biodiversity Conservation Act 1999 and the New South Wales Government Biodiversity Conservation Act 2016. The main threats to the species are grazing by domestic stock and by rabbits, weed invasion, agriculture and roadside maintenance.
