= Prostanthera palustris =

Swamp mint-bush

Conservation status
- Vulnerable (EPBC Act)

Scientific classification
- Kingdom: Plantae
- Clade: Tracheophytes
- Clade: Angiosperms
- Clade: Eudicots
- Clade: Asterids
- Order: Lamiales
- Family: Lamiaceae
- Genus: Prostanthera
- Species: P. palustris

Binomial name
- Prostanthera palustris B.J.Conn
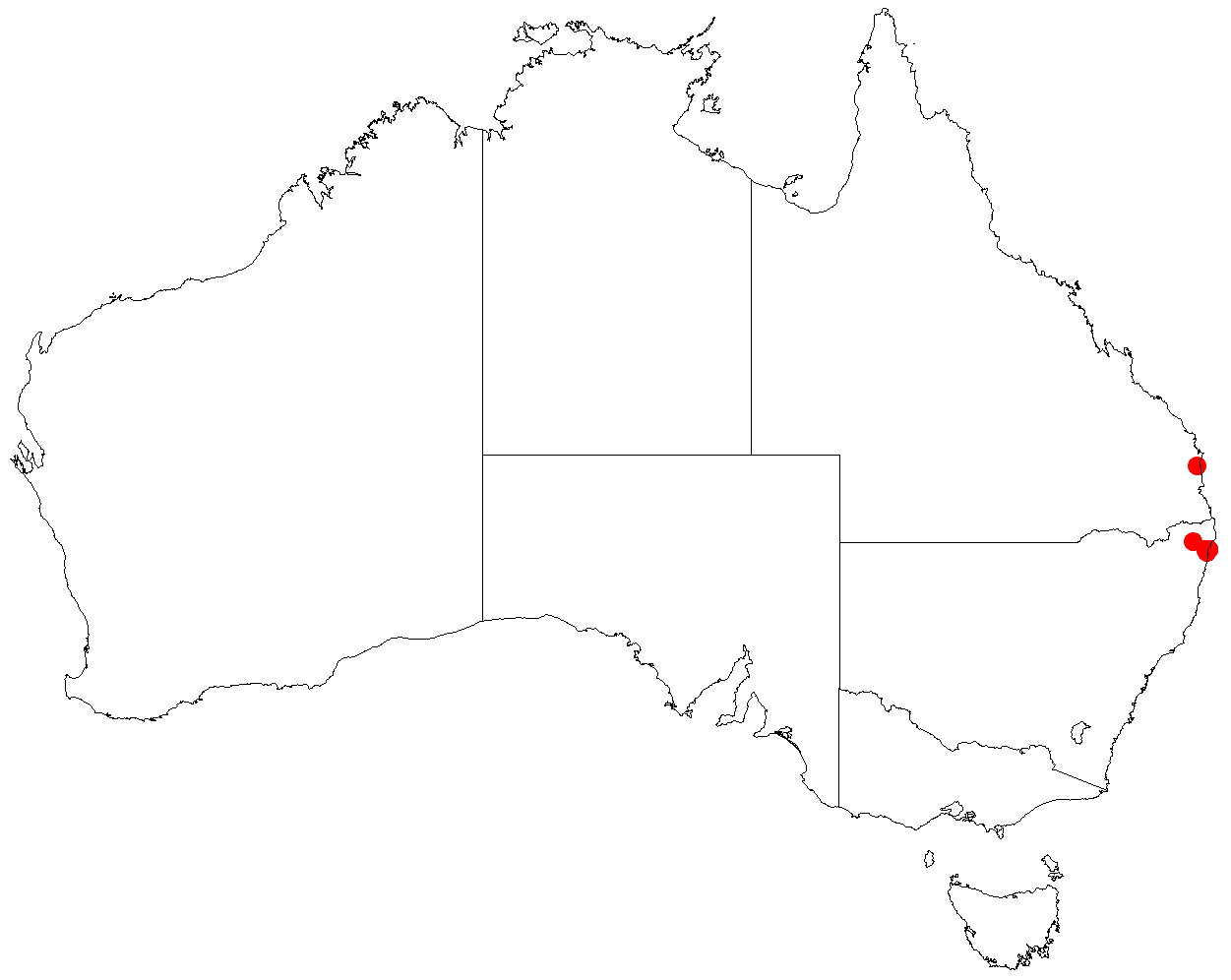
- Occurrence data from AVH

Species of flowering plant

Prostanthera palustris, commonly known as swamp mint-bush, is a species of flowering plant in the family Lamiaceae and is endemic to a restricted area of New South Wales. It is a low, spreading, weak shrub with spatula-shaped leaves and pale mauve and white flowers with yellow spots in the petal tube.

== Description ==
Prostanthera palustris is a low, spreading, weak shrub that typically grows to a height of 0.2–0.3 m (7.9 in – 11.8 in), is not aromatic, and has branches with two longitudinal ridges. The leaves are dull green above, paler below, spatula-shaped, 4–6 mm (0.16–0.24 in) long and 3.5–5 mm (0.14–0.20 in) wide on a petiole about 1–2 mm (0.039–0.079 in) long. The flowers are arranged in groups of four to ten in upper leaf axils on pedicels 0.5–1.5 mm (0.020–0.059 in) long. The sepals are light green and form a tube 2.5–3 mm (0.098–0.118 in) long with two lobes, the lower lobe 1.5–3 mm (0.059–0.118 in) long and the upper lobe 1.5–2 mm (0.059–0.079 in) long. The petals are pale mauve and white with yellow dots inside, 8–10 mm (0.31–0.39 in) long forming a tube 4 mm (0.16 in) long with two lips. The central lobe of the lower lip is 4–4.5 mm (0.16–0.18 in) long and 4.5–5 mm (0.18–0.20 in) wide and the side lobes are about 4 mm (0.16 in) long and 2.5 mm (0.098 in) wide. The upper lip is about 2.5 mm (0.098 in) long and 6–6.5 mm (0.24–0.26 in) wide. Flowering mainly occurs from February to June.

== Taxonomy ==
Prostanthera palustris was first formally described in 1997 by Barry Conn in the journal Telopea from material collected in Bundjalung National Park in 1990.

== Distribution and habitat ==
Swamp mint-bush grows in wet coastal shrubland and heathland in the Jerusalem Creek area of Bundjalung National Park.

== Conservation status ==
This mintbush is classified as "vulnerable" under the Australian Government Environment Protection and Biodiversity Conservation Act 1999 and the New South Wales Government Biodiversity Conservation Act 2016. The main threats to the species include inappropriate fire regimes, trampling and vegetation clearance.
