= Proceedings of the Royal Society of Queensland =

Multidisciplinary scientific journal

Proceedings of The Royal Society of Queensland
- Discipline: Multidisciplinary
- Language: English

Publication details
- History: 1884–present
- Publisher: The Royal Society of Queensland (Australia)
- Frequency: Annual

Standard abbreviations
- ISO 4: Proc. R. Soc. Qld.

Indexing
- CODEN: PRSQAG
- ISSN: 0080-469X
- LCCN: sf79010627
- OCLC no.: 1639402

Links
- Journal homepage

Proceedings of The Royal Society of Queensland is a multidisciplinary scientific journal published by The Royal Society of Queensland. It was established in 1884.

Volumes of the journal are typically published annually, although this schedule has varied over time as the resources of The Royal Society of Queensland have allowed.

While the scope of The Royal Society of Queensland encompasses all of science, including the social sciences that follow scientific method, the scope of the journal is more limited, being restricted to the natural sciences and observations about natural resources and the environment from within other disciplines. However, 'natural sciences' is itself interpreted broadly and also, the journal publishes papers on science policy, science education and science opinion.

All papers are single-blind peer-reviewed.

== Value of local and regional journals ==
The 2021 Honorary Editor, Dr Julien Louys of Griffith University, published a strong defence of regional journals like the Proceedings in his Editorial Foreword to Volume 129:

"The science reported in the following pages represents strong observational data, rigorous interpretations, and discourse that will resonate well beyond the state. Nevertheless, there is a wide-ranging perception, increasingly common across universities and funding bodies, that science should only be published in flashy, high-profile, or international publications. Unfortunately, excellent publications such as the Proceedings are not seen as desirable or even worthwhile venues to submit science. It has even reached the point where academics have been actively discouraged from publishing in more local or regional journals, being informed that such publications would detract from their professional records...

"Such journals provide one of the few remaining outlets for purely local or small-scale scientific observations. This scale may be small from a topical or geographical perspective but can be enormous from a scientific perspective. The grand narratives, the meta-analyses, and the increasingly popular ‘big data’ driven research agendas do not occur in isolation but critically rely on local observations and smaller-scale studies…

"The Great Barrier Reef, one of the natural wonders of the world…is composed of thousands of individual reefs, each in turn composed of billions of coral polyps, each building on the structures left by previous polyps. In much the same way do scientific contributions build upon one another, dependent on the small, local and (according to some) seemingly insignificant outputs."

== Special issues ==
In addition to the annual Proceedings of The Royal Society of Queensland, the Society has also published a number of special editions on topics of scientific and community interest at the time:

- 1976 The Border Ranges: A Land Use Conflict in Regional Perspective
- 1980 Contemporary Cape York Peninsula
- 1981 Public Information: Your Right to Know
- 1984 The Brigalow Belt of Australia
- 1984 The Capricorn Section of the Great Barrier Reef: Past, Present and Future
- 1984 Focus on Stradbroke: New Information on North Stradbroke Island and Surrounding Areas, 1974–1984
- 1986 The Mulga Lands
- 1989 Rural Queensland: A Sustainable Future: The Application of Geographic Information Systems to Land Planning and Management
- 1995 Queensland: the State of Science
- 2002 Landscape Health of Queensland
- 2006 Bushfire 2006 Conference (Vol. 115)
- 2011 A Place of Sandhills: Ecology, Hydrogeomorphology and Management of Queensland’s Dune Islands (Vol. 117)
- 2020 The Land of Clouds Revisited: The Biodiversity and Ecology of the Eungella Rainforests (Vol. 125)
- 2020 Springs of the Great Artesian Basin (Vol. 126)
- 2020 A Rangelands Dialogue: Towards a Sustainable Future (Vol. 127).

== Digitisation ==
In 2014, The Royal Society of Queensland undertook a major project to digitise all past issues of the Proceedings, the Transactions of the Philosophical Society of Queensland, special editions, and a range of assorted historical records. This digitisation effort aims to make this scientifically and historically valuable collection more accessible to scientists, historians and the public generally. Full text search capability is now available back to Volume 1, although issues after 1956 are behind a paywall and the scanned text is yet to be rectified.

In December 2019, the Society resolved to publish the Proceedings online with open access, commencing with Volume 124. In 2021, it added DOI references (prefix 10.53060).

== Honorary editors ==
- 2018 Dr Barry Pollock
- 2019 Ms Revel Pointon, Dr Ross Hynes, Dr Geoff Edwards
- 2020 Emeritus Prof Angela Arthington
- 2021 A/Prof Julien Louys
- 2022 Dr Justyna Miszkiewicz
- 2023 Dr Justyna Miszkiewicz and Julien Louys
