= Chiloglottis × pescottiana =

Bronze bird orchid

Scientific classification
- Kingdom: Plantae
- Clade: Tracheophytes
- Clade: Angiosperms
- Clade: Monocots
- Order: Asparagales
- Family: Orchidaceae
- Subfamily: Orchidoideae
- Tribe: Diurideae
- Genus: Chiloglottis
- Species: C. × pescottiana

Binomial name
- Chiloglottis × pescottiana R.S.Rogers

Synonyms
- × Chilosimpliglottis pescottiana (R.S.Rogers) Jeanes

Species of orchid

Chiloglottis × pescottiana, commonly known as the bronze bird orchid, is a species of orchid endemic to south-eastern Australia. It has two broad leaves and a single greenish bronze or purplish brown flower with a black, ant-like callus on the labellum. It is a natural hybrid formed from a cross between Chiloglottis valida and C. trapeziformis.

== Description ==
Chiloglottis × pescottiana is a terrestrial, perennial, deciduous, herb with two broadly elliptic to egg-shaped leaves 30–60 mm (1–2 in) long and 18–25 mm (0.7–1 in) wide. A single greenish bronze or purplish brown flower 14–18 mm (0.6–0.7 in) long and 20–30 mm (0.8–1 in) wide is borne on a flowering stem 50–80 mm (2–3 in) high. The dorsal sepal is spatula-shaped or egg-shaped with the narrower end towards the base, 12–15 mm (0.5–0.6 in) long and about 4–6 mm (0.16–0.24 in) wide. The lateral sepals are narrow lance-shaped, 15–18 mm (0.6–0.7 in) long, about 1.5 mm (0.06 in) wide and erect at the base then curve downwards and away from each other. There is a glandular tip about 0.5 mm (0.02 in) long on the tip of the dorsal sepal and 1–2 mm (0.04–0.08 in) long on the lateral sepals. The petals are narrow lance-shaped, 12–15 mm (0.5–0.6 in) long, 3–4 mm (0.1–0.2 in) wide and spread apart from each other. The labellum is elliptic to egg-shaped, 10–14 mm (0.4–0.6 in) long and 7–9 mm (0.3–0.4 in) wide with a black, ant-like callus with a large stalked "head" gland in the lower part. Flowering occurs from August to November.

== Taxonomy and naming ==
The bronze bird orchid was first formally described in 1918 by Richard Sanders Rogers who gave it the name Chiloglottis pescottiana and the description was published in Proceedings of the Royal Society of Victoria from a specimen collected near Tallangatta. The specific epithet (pescottiana) honours "Mr. E. E. Pescott" who sent Rogers the type specimens. In 1997 the hybrid origin of this orchid was confirmed.

== Distribution and habitat ==
Chiloglottis × pescottiana grows in open forest and coastal scrub mostly in eastern Victoria but also in the far south-east of New South Wales.
