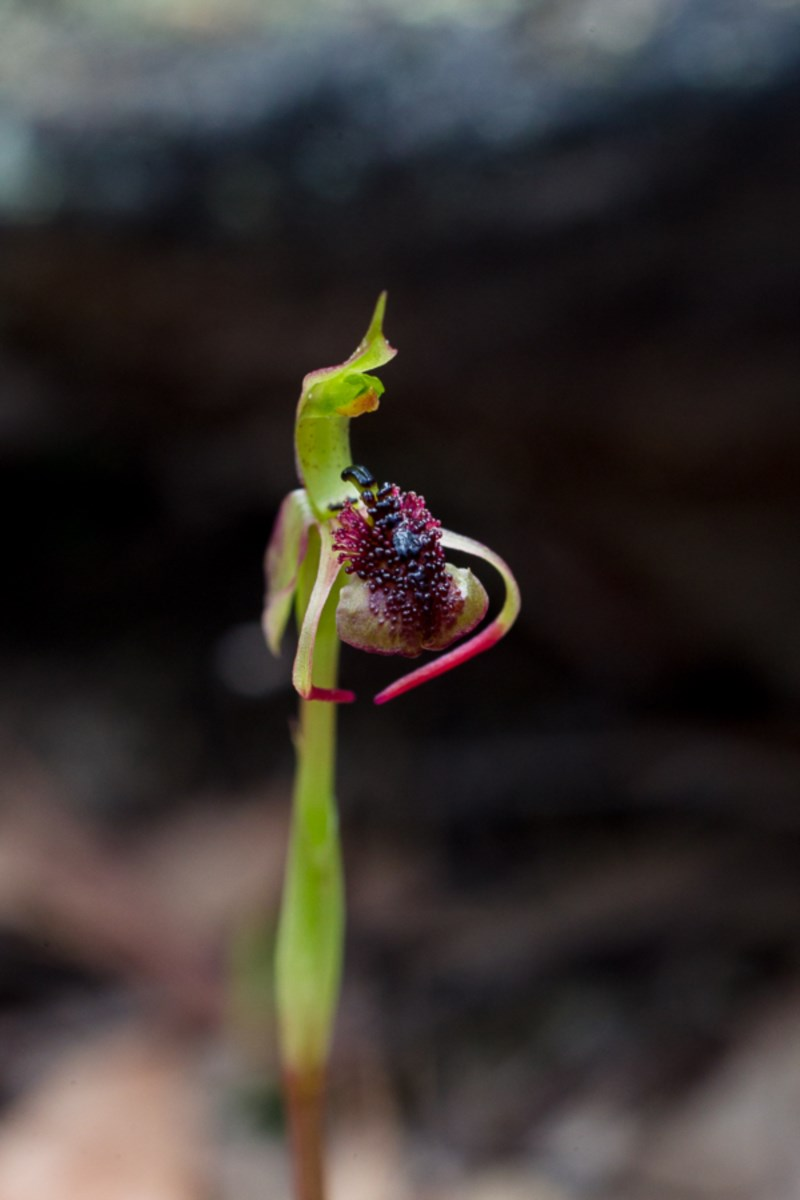

Scientific classification
- Kingdom: Plantae
- Clade: Tracheophytes
- Clade: Angiosperms
- Clade: Monocots
- Order: Asparagales
- Family: Orchidaceae
- Subfamily: Orchidoideae
- Tribe: Diurideae
- Genus: Chiloglottis
- Species: C. trilabra

Binomial name
- Chiloglottis trilabra Fitzg.

Synonyms
- Chiloglottis dockrillii Rupp

= Chiloglottis trilabra =

Long-clubbed wasp orchid

Species of orchid

Chiloglottis trilabra, commonly known as the long-clubbed wasp orchid, is a species of orchid endemic to south-eastern Australia. It has two dark green leaves and a single greenish brown or pinkish flower with a dark red to black, ant-like callus covering most of the upper surface of the labellum. It is similar to both C. seminuda and C. reflexa.

== Description ==
Chiloglottis trilabra is a terrestrial, perennial, deciduous, herb with two dark green, oblong to egg-shaped leaves 20–50 mm (0.8–2 in) long and 10–15 mm (0.4–0.6 in) wide. A single greenish brown or pinkish flower 25–32 mm (0.98–1.3 in) long and 6–7 mm (0.2–0.3 in) wide is borne on a flowering stem 50–100 mm (2–4 in) high. The dorsal sepal is spatula-shaped, 13–16 mm (0.5–0.6 in) long and 2.5–4 mm (0.1–0.2 in) wide. The lateral sepals are linear, 15–18 mm (0.6–0.7 in) long, less than 1 mm (0.04 in) wide and curve downwards. There is a glandular tip 2–3 mm (0.08–0.1 in) long on the dorsal sepal, dark red and 3–5 mm (0.1–0.2 in) long on the lateral sepals. The petals are oblong to lance-shaped, 9–11 mm (0.35–0.43 in) long, about 3 mm (0.1 in) wide and turned downwards towards the ovary. The labellum is more or less horizontal, diamond-shaped, 9–11 mm (0.35–0.43 in) long and 6–7 mm (0.2–0.3 in) wide with a black, ant-like callus surrounded by many stalked and stalkless glands occupying most of its upper surface. The column has narrow wings. Flowering occurs from December to March.

This wasp orchid is similar to C. seminuda which has a callus covering only about two-thirds of the labellum. It is also similar to C. reflexa but has longer lateral sepals and a smaller "head" on the ant-like callus.

== Taxonomy and naming ==
Chiloglottis trilabra was first formally described in 1883 by Robert D. FitzGerald and the description was published in Journal of Botany, British and Foreign from a specimen "obtained on Mount York in the Blue Mountains". The specific epithet (trilabra) is derived from the Latin prefix tri- meaning "three" and labra meaning "lip". The type specimen happened to be an aberrant form having two extra labellums in place of two lateral sepals.

== Distribution and habitat ==
The long-clubbed wasp orchid is widespread in moist parts of forest, mainly on the ranges in New South Wales. In Victoria it is only known from a few areas in the east, but may be more widespread because it has been confused with C. seminuda and C. reflexa.
