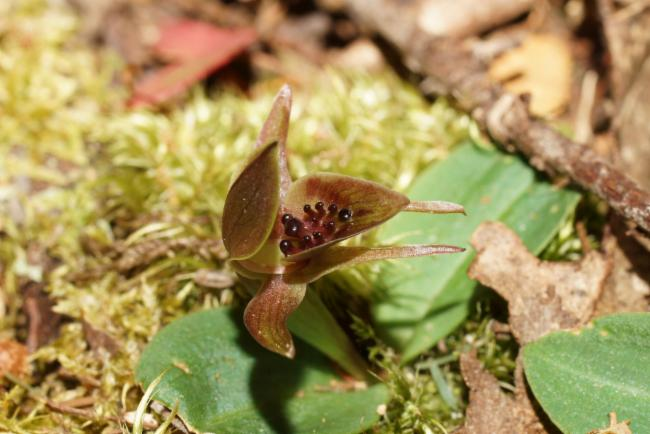
- In Liffey Valley Reserve, Tasmania

Scientific classification
- Kingdom: Plantae
- Clade: Tracheophytes
- Clade: Angiosperms
- Clade: Monocots
- Order: Asparagales
- Family: Orchidaceae
- Subfamily: Orchidoideae
- Tribe: Diurideae
- Genus: Chiloglottis
- Species: C. grammata

Binomial name
- Chiloglottis grammata G.W.Carr

Synonyms
- Simpliglottis grammata (G.W.Carr) Jeanes

= Chiloglottis grammata =

Small bird orchid

Species of orchid

Chiloglottis grammata, commonly known as the small bird orchid, is a species of orchid endemic to Tasmania. It has two broad leaves and a single greenish purple to purple flower with short, shiny greenish to reddish or black calli and low ridges resembling writing, covering most of the upper surface of the labellum. It is widespread and common in high rainfall mountainous areas.

== Description ==
Chiloglottis grammata is a terrestrial, perennial, deciduous, herb with two leaves 50–80 mm (2–3 in) long and 15–25 mm (0.6–1 in) wide. A single greenish purple to purple flower 16–19 mm (0.6–0.7 in) long and 25–30 mm (0.98–1.2 in) wide is borne on a flowering stem 20–40 mm (0.8–2 in) high. The dorsal sepal is broadly egg-shaped to spatula-shaped with the narrower end towards the base, 15–19 mm (0.6–0.7 in) long and 8–11 mm (0.3–0.4 in) wide. The lateral sepals are linear to lance-shaped, 14–16 mm (0.55–0.63 in) long, about 2 mm (0.08 in) wide and taper towards their tips. There is a glandular tip 0.5–1.0 mm (0.02–0.04 in) long on the end of all three sepals. The petals are lance-shaped but curved, 13–16 mm (0.5–0.6 in) long, about 4 mm (0.2 in) wide and spread widely apart from each other. The labellum is egg-shaped to heart-shaped, 8–11 mm (0.3–0.4 in) long and 7–10 mm (0.3–0.4 in) wide with short, shiny greenish to reddish or black calli up to 1 mm (0.04 in) long and low ridges resembling writing covering most of its upper surface. Flowering occurs from October to February.

== Taxonomy and naming ==
Chiloglottis grammata was first formally described in 1991 by Geoffrey Carr and the description was published in Indigenous Flora and Fauna Association Miscellaneous Paper 1 from a specimen collected from Jackeys Marsh in the Meander Valley.

== Distribution and habitat ==
The small bird orchid is widespread and locally common in Tasmania, especially in moist to wet forest in mountainous areas, sometimes forming dense colonies.
