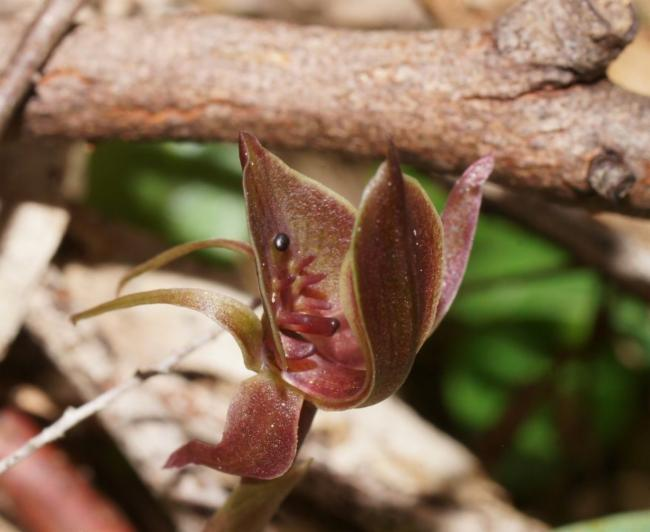
- Near Ridgeway in Tasmania

Scientific classification
- Kingdom: Plantae
- Clade: Tracheophytes
- Clade: Angiosperms
- Clade: Monocots
- Order: Asparagales
- Family: Orchidaceae
- Subfamily: Orchidoideae
- Tribe: Diurideae
- Genus: Chiloglottis
- Species: C. triceratops

Binomial name
- Chiloglottis triceratops D.L.Jones

Synonyms
- Simpliglottis triceratops (D.L.Jones) Jeanes

= Chiloglottis triceratops =

Three-horned bird orchid

Species of orchid

Chiloglottis triceratops, commonly known as the three-horned bird orchid, is a species of orchid endemic to Tasmania. It has two broad leaves and a greenish brown to purplish brown flower with a few column-like calli near the mid-line of the labellum.

== Description ==
Chiloglottis triceratops is a terrestrial, perennial, deciduous, herb with two leaves 30–60 mm (1–2 in) long and 10–25 mm (0.4–1 in) wide. A single greenish brown to purplish brown flower 15–24 mm (0.6–0.9 in) long and 25–30 mm (0.98–1.2 in) wide is borne on a flowering stem 15–40 mm (0.6–2 in) high. The dorsal sepal is spatula-shaped to egg-shaped with the narrower end towards the base, 15–24 mm (0.6–0.9 in) long and 8–11 mm (0.3–0.4 in) wide. The lateral sepals are linear to narrow lance-shaped, 15–20 mm (0.6–0.8 in) long and about 2 mm (0.08 in) wide. There is a glandular tip 2–3 mm (0.08–0.1 in) long on the end of all three sepals. The petals are lance-shaped but curved, 15–20 mm (0.6–0.8 in) long, 4–6 mm (0.16–0.24 in) wide and curve forwards. The labellum is broadly egg-shaped to heart-shaped, 12–15 mm (0.5–0.6 in) long and 9–13 mm (0.4–0.5 in) wide with a brown to black column-like callus 3–4 mm (0.1–0.2 in) tall in the centre surrounded by similar but shorter calli. The column is greenish brown with dark red streaks, 15–16 mm (0.59–0.63 in) long and 5–7 mm (0.2–0.3 in) wide with narrow wings. Flowering occurs from November to January.

== Taxonomy and naming ==
Chiloglottis triceratops was first formally described in 1998 by David Jones and the description was published in Australian Orchid Research. The specific epithet (triceratops) refers to the similarity between the dinosaur Triceratops and the tall calli on the labellum of this orchid.

== Distribution and habitat ==
The three-horned bird orchid is widespread and common in Tasmania, growing in shrubby and heathy forest, often in dense colonies.
