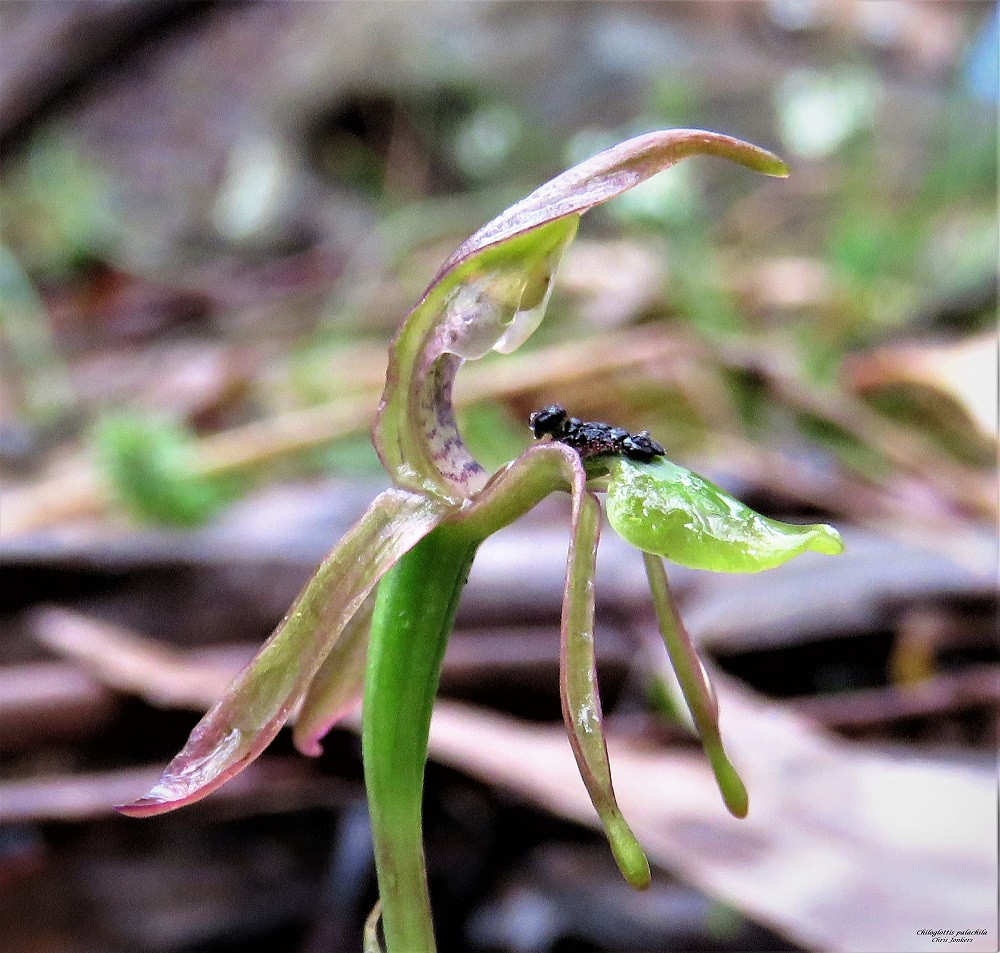
- Near Yetholme

Scientific classification
- Kingdom: Plantae
- Clade: Tracheophytes
- Clade: Angiosperms
- Clade: Monocots
- Order: Asparagales
- Family: Orchidaceae
- Subfamily: Orchidoideae
- Tribe: Diurideae
- Genus: Chiloglottis
- Species: C. palachila

Binomial name
- Chiloglottis palachila D.L.Jones & M.A.Clem.

= Chiloglottis palachila =

Spade-lipped wasp orchid

Species of orchid

Chiloglottis palachila, commonly known as the spade-lipped wasp orchid, is a species of orchid endemic to some of the higher places in northern New South Wales. It has two leaves and a single green to greenish pink flower with a black, ant-like callus on the base of the labellum. The tips of the lateral sepals have distinctive swollen, brown glandular tips.

== Description ==
Chiloglottis palachila is a terrestrial, perennial, deciduous, herb with two elliptic leaves lying flat on the ground, 30–70 mm (1–3 in) long and 12–15 mm (0.5–0.6 in) wide on a petiole 10–30 mm (0.4–1 in) long. A single green to greenish pink flower 20–22 mm (0.8–0.9 in) long and 5–7 mm (0.2–0.3 in) wide is borne on a flowering stem 120–170 mm (5–7 in) high. The dorsal sepal is linear to spatula-shaped, 12–18 mm (0.5–0.7 in) long, 3–3.5 mm (0.12–0.14 in) wide with a narrow glandular tip a further 2 mm (0.08 in) long. The lateral sepals are linear but tapered, 12–15 mm (0.5–0.6 in) long, about 1 mm (0.04 in) wide and curve strongly downwards with a swollen brown glandular tip about 2 mm (0.08 in) long. The petals are oblong, 10–12 mm (0.4–0.5 in) long, 2–3 mm (0.08–0.1 in) wide and turned downwards near the sides of the ovary. The labellum is spade-shaped, held horizontally, 5–6 mm (0.20–0.24 in) long and 4–5 mm (0.16–0.20 in) wide. About one-third of the base of the labellum is covered with a black, ant-like callus about 3 mm (0.1 in) long. The column has prominent reddish striations and is 7–9 mm (0.3–0.4 in) long, about 3 mm (0.1 in) wide with broad wings. Flowering occurs from April to June.

== Taxonomy and naming ==
Chiloglottis palachila was first formally described in 1991 by David Jones and Mark Clements from a specimen collected at Barrington Tops and the description was published in Australian Orchid Research. Jones notes that the specific epithet (palachila) is "from the Latin palachilus meaning "spade-shaped".

== Distribution and habitat ==
The spade-lipped wasp orchid grows in open forest near rainforest, especially near streams, but also under low shrubs on exposed peaks. It occurs in disjunct populations at Point Lookout, Barrington Tops and Mount Kaputar National Park.
