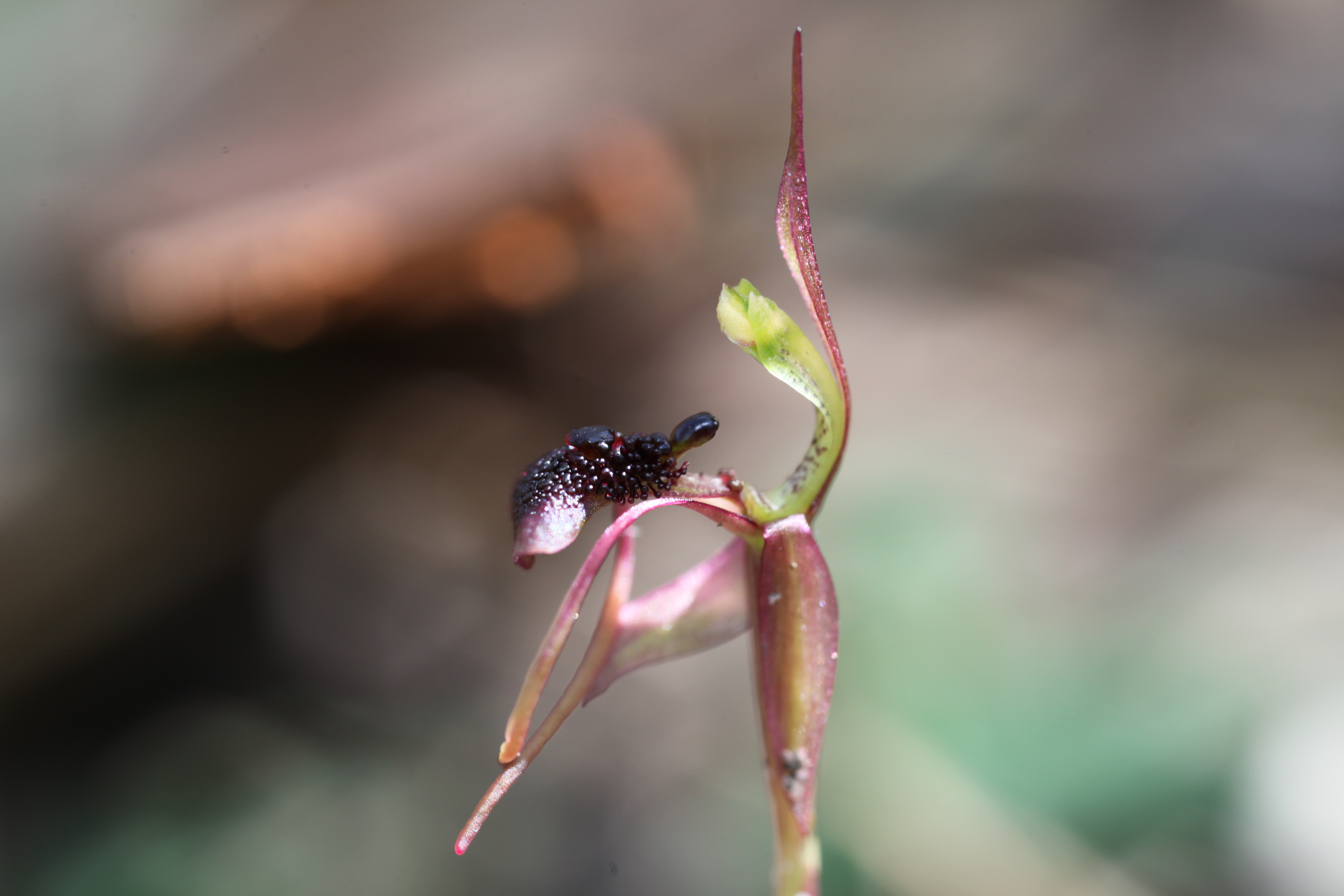

Scientific classification
- Kingdom: Plantae
- Clade: Tracheophytes
- Clade: Angiosperms
- Clade: Monocots
- Order: Asparagales
- Family: Orchidaceae
- Subfamily: Orchidoideae
- Tribe: Diurideae
- Genus: Chiloglottis
- Species: C. formicifera

Binomial name
- Chiloglottis formicifera Fitzg.

Synonyms
- Myrmechila formicifera (Fitzg.) D.L.Jones & M.A.Clem.

= Chiloglottis formicifera =

Common ant orchid

Species of orchid

Chiloglottis formicifera, commonly known as common ant orchid, is a species of orchid endemic to New South Wales. It has two broad leaves and a single narrow, greenish or reddish flower with a black, ant-like callus covering most of the upper surface of the labellum. There is a single record of this species from New Zealand.

== Description ==
Chiloglottis formicifera is a terrestrial, perennial, deciduous, herb with two leaves 30–60 mm (1–2 in) long and 15–25 mm (0.6–1 in) wide. A single greenish or reddish flower 12–16 mm (0.5–0.6 in) long and 6–8 mm (0.2–0.3 in) wide is borne on a flowering stem 60–100 mm (2–4 in) high. The dorsal sepal is spatula-shaped, 10–12.5 mm (0.4–0.5 in) long and about 3 mm (0.1 in) wide. The lateral sepals are 9–10 mm (0.35–0.39 in) long, about 0.7 mm (0.03 in) wide and erect at the base then curve downwards. There is a glandular tip about 0.5 mm (0.02 in) long on the end of all three sepals. The petals are lance-shaped with the narrower end towards the base, 8–10 mm (0.3–0.4 in) long, about 3 mm (0.1 in) wide and turned strongly downwards. The labellum is diamond-shaped, 7–10 mm (0.3–0.4 in) long and 6–7.5 mm (0.2–0.3 in) wide with a narrow, shiny black, ant-like callus covering most of its upper surface. Flowering occurs from August to November.

== Taxonomy and naming ==
Chiloglottis formicifera was first formally described in 1877 by Robert D. FitzGerald and the description was published in his book Australian Orchids from a specimen collected "in a gully at the Kurrajong". The specific epithet (formicifera) is derived from the Latin word formica meaning "ant" with the suffix -fera meaning "bear", "carry" or "have".

== Distribution and habitat ==
Common ant orchid grows in moist places in forest between the Northern Tablelands and Nowra. There is a single historical record from Kaitaia in New Zealand.
