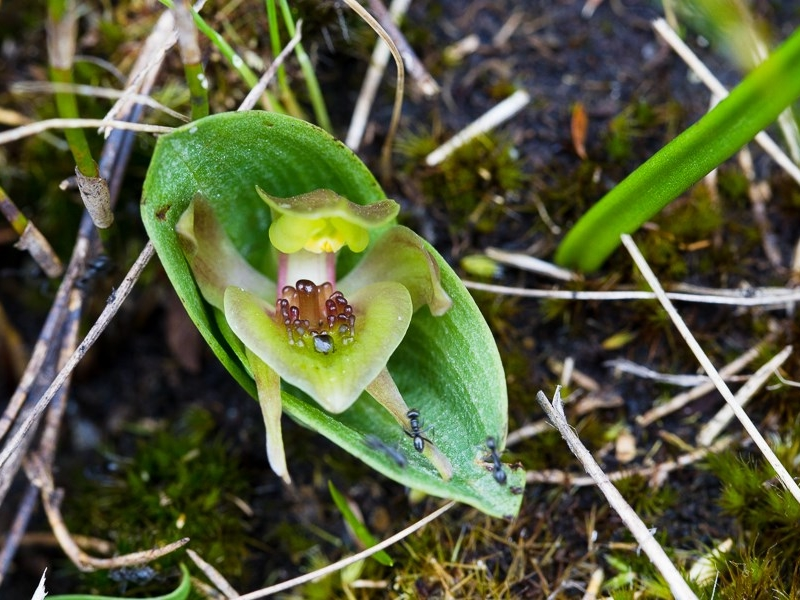

Scientific classification
- Kingdom: Plantae
- Clade: Tracheophytes
- Clade: Angiosperms
- Clade: Monocots
- Order: Asparagales
- Family: Orchidaceae
- Subfamily: Orchidoideae
- Tribe: Diurideae
- Genus: Chiloglottis
- Species: C. turfosa

Binomial name
- Chiloglottis turfosa D.L.Jones

Synonyms
- Simpliglottis turfosa (D.L.Jones) Szlach.

= Chiloglottis turfosa =

Bog bird orchid

Species of orchid

Chiloglottis turfosa, commonly known as the bog bird orchid, is a species of orchid endemic to southern New South Wales and the Australian Capital Territory. It has two dark green leaves and a single greenish to reddish brown flower with a shiny dark reddish callus of mostly thin, column-like glands on the labellum.

== Description ==
Chiloglottis turfosa is a terrestrial, perennial, deciduous, herb with two egg-shaped to almost round leaves 25–60 mm (1–2 in) long and 16–30 mm (0.6–1 in) wide on a petiole 4–12 mm (0.2–0.5 in) long. A single greenish to reddish brown flower 18–23 mm (0.7–0.9 in) long and wide is borne on a flowering stem 20–30 mm (0.8–1 in) high. The dorsal sepal is spatula-shaped, to egg-shaped with the narrower end towards the base, 18–22 mm (0.7–0.9 in) long and 6–8 mm (0.2–0.3 in) wide. The lateral sepals are linear, tapering towards the tip, 16–18 mm (0.6–0.7 in) long, 3–4 mm (0.1–0.2 in) wide, erect near their bases but turn downwards, often sharply, and away from each other. There is a glandular tip about 2–3 mm (0.08–0.1 in) long on the end of the all three sepals. The petals are egg-shaped to lance-shaped, 12–15 mm (0.5–0.6 in) long, 5–6 mm (0.20–0.24 in) wide, spread apart from each other and curve upwards near the labellum. The labellum is broadly egg-shaped to heart-shaped, 12–13 mm (0.47–0.51 in) long and 11–12 mm (0.43–0.47 in) wide. There are up to 24 erect, dark reddish, column like calli up to 3 mm (0.1 in) long, the longest nearer the base of the labellum. The column is greenish brown with darker marks, 12–13 mm (0.47–0.51 in) long and about 5 mm (0.2 in) wide with relatively broad wings. Flowering occurs from November to December.

== Taxonomy and naming ==
Chiloglottis turfosa was first formally described in 1991 by David Jones from a specimen collected near the Tantangara Dam and the description was published in Australian Orchid Research. The specific epithet (turfosa) is a Latin word meaning "a peat bog" referring to the habitat of this orchid.

== Distribution and habitat ==
The bog bird orchid grows with grasses and under shrubs in peaty soil in the Snowy Mountains near Kiandra and Adaminaby and in the Australian Capital Territory.
