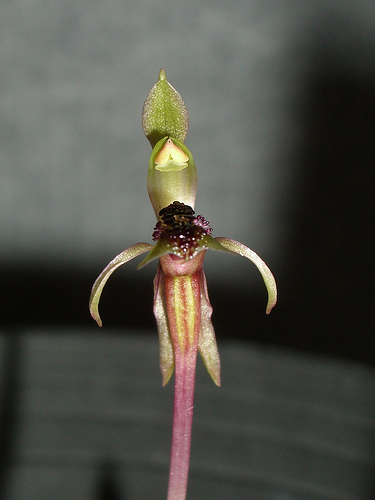

Scientific classification
- Kingdom: Plantae
- Clade: Tracheophytes
- Clade: Angiosperms
- Clade: Monocots
- Order: Asparagales
- Family: Orchidaceae
- Subfamily: Orchidoideae
- Tribe: Diurideae
- Genus: Chiloglottis
- Species: C. truncata

Binomial name
- Chiloglottis truncata D.L.Jones & M.A.Clem.

Synonyms
- Myrmechochila truncata (D.L.Jones & M.A.Clem.) D.L.Jones & M.A.Clem.

= Chiloglottis truncata =

Small ant orchid

Species of orchid

Chiloglottis truncata, commonly known as the small ant orchid, is a small species of orchid endemic to Queensland. It has two leaves and a single green flower with a shiny black, insect-like callus occupying most of the labellum.

== Description ==
Chiloglottis truncata is a terrestrial, perennial, deciduous, herb with two leaves 50–60 mm (2.0–2.4 in) long and 14–16 mm (0.55–0.63 in) wide. A single green flower 14–16 mm (0.55–0.63 in) long and 4–5 mm (0.16–0.20 in) wide is borne on a flowering stem 60–100 mm (2–4 in) high. The dorsal sepal is 10–11 mm (0.39–0.43 in) long and 2–2.5 mm (0.08–0.1 in) wide. The lateral sepals are 9–10 mm (0.35–0.39 in) long, about 1 mm (0.04 in) wide and curve downwards. There is a glandular tip about 1 mm (0.04 in) long on all three sepals. The petals are about 8 mm (0.3 in) long, 2 mm (0.08 in) wide and turn downwards towards the ovary. The labellum is trowel-shaped, 7.5–8 mm (0.30–0.31 in) long and about 4 mm (0.16 in) wide with a square-cut tip and a narrow, shiny black, insect-like callus extending to its tip. Flowering occurs from July to September.

== Taxonomy and naming ==
Chiloglottis truncata was first formally described in 1987 by David Jones and Mark Clements from a specimen collected at Anduramba and the description was published in Proceedings of the Royal Society of Queensland. The specific epithet (truncata) is a Latin word meaning "shorten by cutting off".

== Distribution and habitat ==
The small ant orchid grows in forest and woodland between Kingaroy and Toowoomba.
