= Chiloglottis sphyrnoides =

Forest wasp orchid

Scientific classification
- Kingdom: Plantae
- Clade: Tracheophytes
- Clade: Angiosperms
- Clade: Monocots
- Order: Asparagales
- Family: Orchidaceae
- Subfamily: Orchidoideae
- Tribe: Diurideae
- Genus: Chiloglottis
- Species: C. sphyrnoides

Binomial name
- Chiloglottis sphyrnoides D.L.Jones

Species of orchid

Chiloglottis sphyrnoides, commonly known as forest wasp orchid, is a species of orchid endemic to north-eastern New South Wales and south-eastern Queensland. It has two dark green leaves and a single green or reddish pink flower with a shiny black, insect-like callus surrounded by red club-shaped calli on two-thirds of the base of the labellum.

== Description ==
Chiloglottis sphyrnoides is a terrestrial, perennial, deciduous, herb with two egg-shaped to elliptic leaves 35–85 mm (1–3 in) long and 15–23 mm (0.6–0.9 in) wide on a petiole 5–15 mm (0.2–0.6 in) long. A single green or reddish pink flower 18–22 mm (0.7–0.9 in) long and 7–9 mm (0.3–0.4 in) wide is borne on a flowering stem 50–90 mm (2–4 in) high. The dorsal sepal is spatula-shaped, 16–18 mm (0.6–0.7 in) long and 3–4 mm (0.1–0.2 in) wide. The lateral sepals are linear, 13–17 mm (0.5–0.7 in) long, about 1 mm (0.04 in) wide and curve downwards. There is a glandular tip 2–2.5 mm (0.08–0.1 in) long on the end of the dorsal sepal and 4–6 mm (0.16–0.24 in) long on the lateral sepals. The petals are narrow oblong, 11–13 mm (0.4–0.5 in) long, about 4 mm (0.2 in) wide and turn downwards towards the ovary. The labellum is broadly spatula-shaped, 10–12 mm (0.4–0.5 in) long and 7–8.5 mm (0.28–0.33 in) wide. There is a shiny black, insect-like callus about 2 mm (0.08 in) long and wide near the base of the labellum. This large callus is surrounded by reddish, club-shaped calli and small red calli. The column is green with purplish black blotches, 9–10 mm (0.35–0.39 in) long and about 4 mm (0.2 in) wide with narrow wings. Flowering occurs from December to April.

== Taxonomy and naming ==
Chiloglottis sphyrnoides was first formally described in 1991 by David Jones from a specimen collected in the Lamington National Park and the description was published in Australian Orchid Research. The specific epithet (sphyrnoides) refers to the similarity of the shape of the large callus on the labellum resembling the head of a shark in the genus Sphyrna. The ending -oides is derived from an Ancient Greek word εἶδος (eîdos), meaning “form" or "likeness”.

== Distribution and habitat ==
Forest wasp orchid grows in moist places in tall forest near Nowendoc and in the Lamington National Park.
