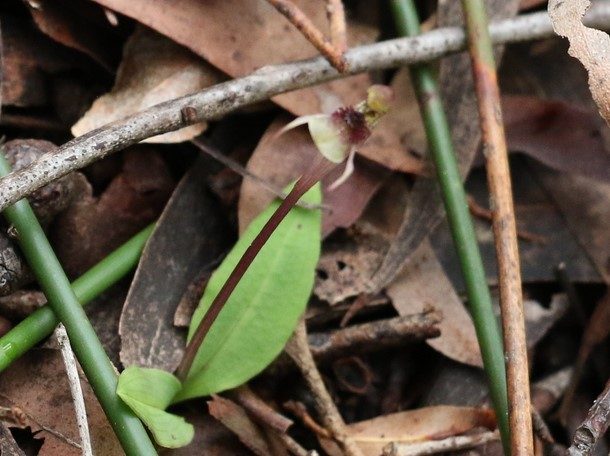

Scientific classification
- Kingdom: Plantae
- Clade: Tracheophytes
- Clade: Angiosperms
- Clade: Monocots
- Order: Asparagales
- Family: Orchidaceae
- Subfamily: Orchidoideae
- Tribe: Diurideae
- Genus: Chiloglottis
- Species: C. sphaerula

Binomial name
- Chiloglottis sphaerula D.L.Jones

= Chiloglottis sphaerula =

Species of orchid

Chiloglottis sphaerula is a species of orchid endemic to a small part of New South Wales. It has two dark green leaves and a single green to reddish pink flower with a shiny black insect-like callus covering two-thirds of the base of the labellum but with the tip of the labellum free of callus.

== Description ==
Chiloglottis sphaerula is a terrestrial, perennial, deciduous, herb with two egg-shaped leaves 45–55 mm (1.8–2.2 in) long and 15–20 mm (0.6–0.8 in) wide on a petiole 5–12 mm (0.2–0.5 in) long. A single green to reddish pink flower 20–25 mm (0.8–1 in) long is borne on a flowering stem 80–120 mm (3–5 in) high. The dorsal sepal is spatula-shaped, to egg-shaped with the narrower end towards the base, 14–16 mm (0.55–0.63 in) long and 3–6 mm (0.12–0.24 in) wide. The lateral sepals are linear, 14–17 mm (0.6–0.7 in) long, about 1.5 mm (0.06 in) wide, erect near their bases but turn downwards and away from each other. There is a glandular tip about 2 mm (0.08 in) long on the end of the dorsal sepal and 3–6 mm (0.1–0.2 in) long on the lateral sepals. The petals are narrow egg-shaped with the narrower end towards the base, 12–15 mm (0.5–0.6 in) long, about 4 mm (0.2 in) wide and turn downwards near the ovary. The labellum is wedge-shaped to trowel-shaped, 12–14 mm (0.5–0.6 in) long and about 8 mm (0.3 in) wide. There is a shiny black, insect-like callus about 2 mm (0.08 in) long and 2.5 mm (0.1 in) wide, occupying two-thirds of the labellum base. The large callus is surrounded by many dark reddish, club-shaped calli up to 2 mm (0.08 in) long and by smaller calli near its base. The remaining one-third of the tip of the labellum is devoid of calli. The column is pale green with reddish flecks, 9.5–10.5 mm (0.37–0.41 in) long and about 4 mm (0.2 in) wide with narrow wings. Flowering occurs from December to February.

== Taxonomy ==
Chiloglottis sphaerula was first formally described in 2006 by David Jones from a specimen collected in the Barrington Tops National Park and the description was published in Australian Orchid Research. The specific epithet (sphaerula) is a Latin word meaning "ball" referring to the shape of the "head" of the insect-like callus.

This species was formerly known as Chiloglottis sp. aff. sphyrnoides (Northern Tablelands).

== Distribution and habitat ==
This orchid grows in tall, moist forest on the southern part of the Northern Tablelands and Barrington Tops National Park.
