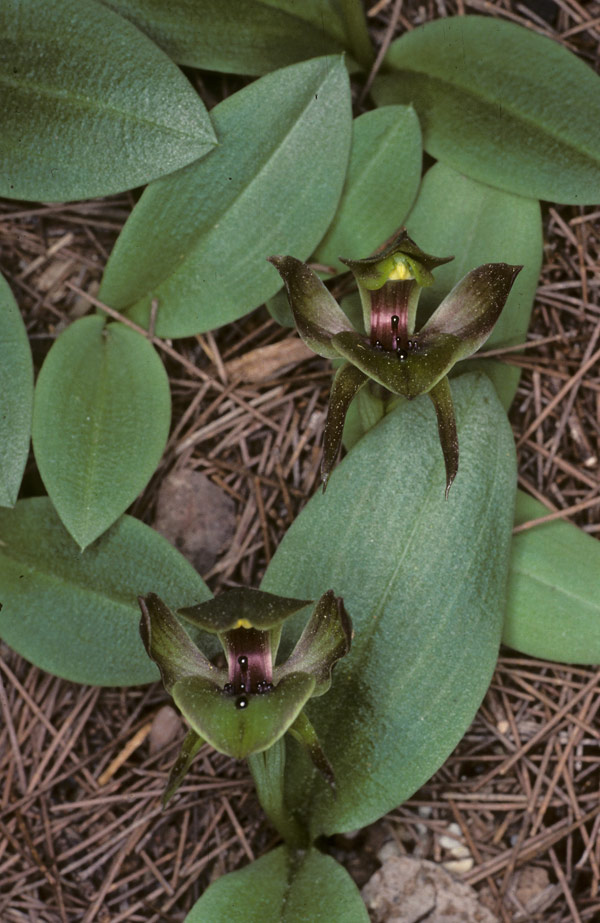

Scientific classification
- Kingdom: Plantae
- Clade: Tracheophytes
- Clade: Angiosperms
- Clade: Monocots
- Order: Asparagales
- Family: Orchidaceae
- Subfamily: Orchidoideae
- Tribe: Diurideae
- Genus: Chiloglottis
- Species: C. gunnii

Binomial name
- Chiloglottis gunnii Lindl.

Synonyms
- Caladenia gunnii (Lindl.) Rchb.f.; Chiloglottis platychila G.W.Carr; Chiologottis gunnii F.Muell. orth. var.; Simpliglottis gunnii (Lindl.) Szlach.

= Chiloglottis gunnii =

Tall bird orchid

Species of orchid

Chiloglottis gunnii, commonly known as the tall bird orchid, is a species of orchid endemic to Tasmania. It has two broad leaves and a single green to purplish brown flower with a line of erect calli with swollen heads along the mid-line of the labellum. It is widespread but mainly in coastal districts and most commonly in moist to wet forest.

== Description ==
Chiloglottis gunnii is a terrestrial, perennial, deciduous, herb with two leaves 40–60 mm (1.6–2.4 in) long and 15–20 mm (0.6–0.8 in) wide. A single green to purplish brown flower 20–24 mm (0.79–0.94 in) long and 20–25 mm (0.8–1 in) wide is borne on a flowering stem 60–100 mm (2–4 in) high. The dorsal sepal is egg-shaped to spatula-shaped with the narrower end towards the base, 20–24 mm (0.8–0.9 in) long and 7–11 mm (0.3–0.4 in) wide. The lateral sepals are linear to lance-shaped, 15–20 mm (0.6–0.8 in) long, about 2 mm (0.08 in) wide and taper towards their tips. There is a glandular tip 0.5–1.5 mm (0.02–0.06 in) long on the end of all three sepals. The petals are lance-shaped but curved, 15–17 mm (0.6–0.7 in) long, 4.5–6 mm (0.18–0.24 in) wide and spread widely apart from each other. The labellum is broadly egg-shaped to heart-shaped, 10–13 mm (0.4–0.5 in) long and 10–15 mm (0.4–0.6 in) wide with a line of pillar-like calli about 3 mm (0.1 in) high with large swollen heads up to 2 mm (0.08 in) wide. The column is 15–18 mm (0.6–0.7 in) long and 5–6 mm (0.20–0.24 in) wide and curved with narrow wings.

== Taxonomy and naming ==
Chiloglottis gunnii was first formally described in 1840 by John Lindley and the description was published in his book The Genera and Species of Orchidaceous Plants. The specific epithet (gunnii) honours Ronald Campbell Gunn, who collected the type specimen which was sent to William Jackson Hooker who forwarded it to Lindley.

== Distribution and habitat ==
The tall bird orchid is widespread but uncommon, growing mostly in wet forest and coastal scrub.
