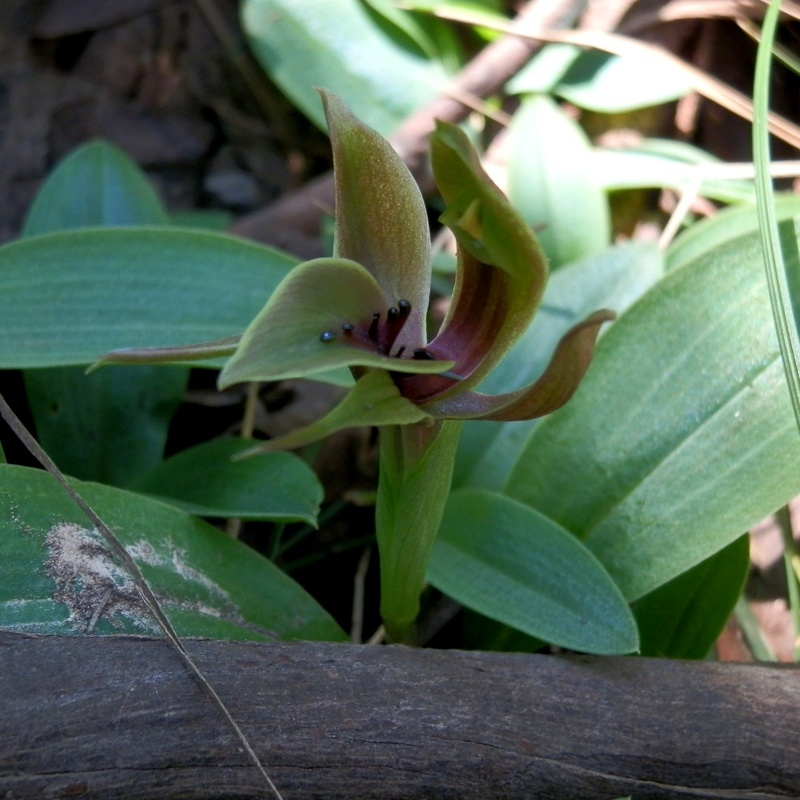
- Near Upper Ferntree Gully

Scientific classification
- Kingdom: Plantae
- Clade: Embryophytes
- Clade: Tracheophytes
- Clade: Angiosperms
- Clade: Monocots
- Order: Asparagales
- Family: Orchidaceae
- Subfamily: Orchidoideae
- Tribe: Diurideae
- Genus: Chiloglottis
- Species: C. jeanesii

Binomial name
- Chiloglottis jeanesii D.L.Jones

Synonyms
- Simpliglottis jeanesii (D.L.Jones) D.L.Jones

= Chiloglottis jeanesii =

Mountain bird orchid

Species of orchid

Chiloglottis jeanesii, commonly known as the mountain bird orchid, is a species of orchid endemic to Victoria. It has two broad leaves and a single green to dark purplish brown flower with shiny black, column-like calli on the labellum.

== Description ==
Chiloglottis jeanesii is a terrestrial, perennial, deciduous, herb with two elliptic leaves 27–40 mm (1–2 in) long and 10–18 mm (0.4–0.7 in) wide on a petiole 8–18 mm (0.3–0.7 in) long. A single green to dark purplish brown flower 17–20 mm (0.7–0.8 in) long and 25–30 mm (0.98–1.2 in) wide is borne on a flowering stem 45–70 mm (2–3 in) high. The dorsal sepal is egg-shaped with the narrower end towards the base, 17–20 mm (0.7–0.8 in) long and 7–9 mm (0.3–0.4 in) wide. The lateral sepals are narrow linear, 14–17 mm (0.6–0.7 in) long, about 2 mm (0.08 in) wide, held horizontally below the labellum and more or less parallel to each other. There is a glandular tip about 1 mm (0.04 in) long on all three sepals. The petals are narrow lance-shaped but curved, 13–16 mm (0.5–0.6 in) long, about 2.5 mm (0.1 in) wide, spread widely apart from each other and curve upwards. The labellum is egg-shaped to heart-shaped, 10–13 mm (0.4–0.5 in) long and 9–12 mm (0.4–0.5 in) wide. About half of the upper surface of the labellum is covered by a callus shiny black, column-like glands up to 2.5 mm (0.1 in) long. The column is green to brown with reddish flecks, 12–15 mm (0.5–0.6 in) long, 5–6 mm (0.20–0.24 in) wide with broad wings. Flowering from November to January.

== Taxonomy and naming ==
Chiloglottis jeanesii was first formally described in 1997 by David Jones from a specimen collected near Toorongo and the description was published in Muelleria. The specific epithet (jeanesii) honours the botanist and orchid expert Jeffrey Jeanes.

== Distribution and habitat ==
The mountain bird orchid grows in moist to wet forest in mountainous areas in the Sherbrooke Forest, Baw Baw National Park and Dandenong Ranges National Park.
