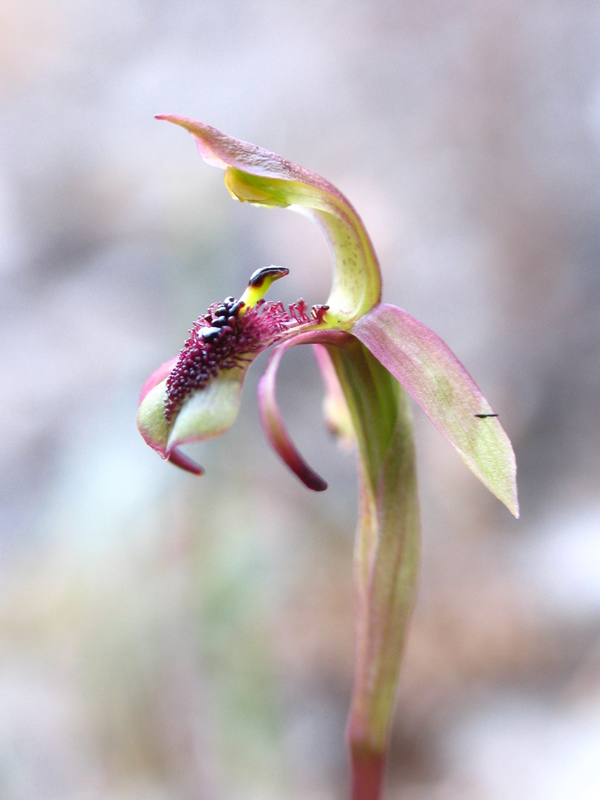
- Chiloglottis reflexa the short-clubbed wasp orchid

Scientific classification
- Kingdom: Plantae
- Clade: Tracheophytes
- Clade: Angiosperms
- Clade: Monocots
- Order: Asparagales
- Family: Orchidaceae
- Subfamily: Orchidoideae
- Tribe: Diurideae
- Subtribe: Drakaeinae
- Genus: Chiloglottis; R.Br., 1810

Type species
- Chiloglottis diphylla R.Br.

Synonyms
- Simpliglottis Szlach.; × Chilosimpliglottis Jeanes; Myrmechila D.L.Jones & M.A.Clem.

= Chiloglottis =

Wasp orchids

Genus of orchids

Chiloglottis, commonly known as wasp orchids, ant orchids or bird orchids, is a genus of about 25 species of flowering plants in the orchid family, Orchidaceae and is found in eastern Australia and New Zealand. Wasp orchids are terrestrial herbs which grow in colonies of genetically identical plants. They usually have two leaves at the base of the plant and a single resupinate ("upside-down") flower. The labellum is more or less diamond-shaped and has calli resembling the body of a wingless female wasp.

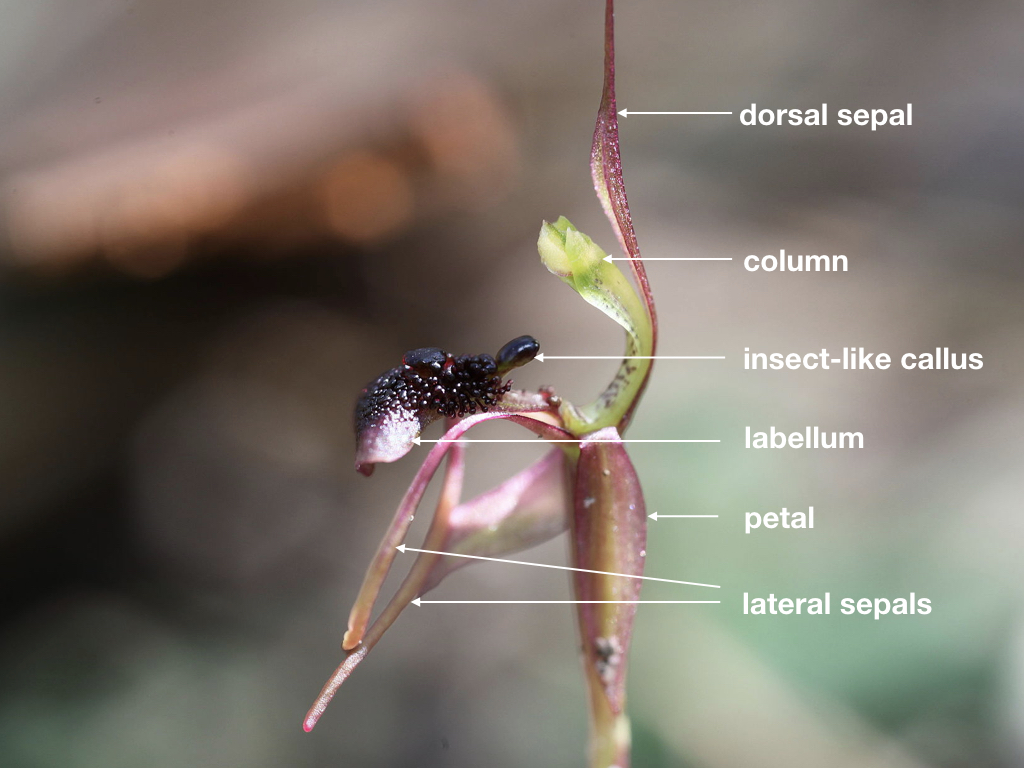
Labelled image of Chiloglottis formicifera

== Taxonomy and naming ==
The genus Chiloglottis was first formally described in 1810 by Robert Brown. Brown described Chiloglottis diphylla at the same time, making it the type species.

David Jones has transferred some species, especially those commonly known as "bird orchids" (Simpliglottis) and "ant orchids" (Myrmechila) to other genera, but the change has not been widely accepted.

== Distribution ==
This genus of orchids is native to Australia and New Zealand (including Chatham Island and the Antipodes Islands).

== Ecology ==
The flowers of wasp, ant and bird orchids are pollinated by sexual deception (pseudocopulation) of thynnine wasps, except for C. cornuta which is self-pollinating. A key feature is that each species of orchid is pollinated by a different species of wasp.

Male wasps are attracted by wind-borne pheromones released by glands on the sepals of the flowers. They usually land on the labellum, on another part of the plant or nearby and then walk or fly to the labellum. They crawl over the labellum, searching for the female wasp. They then attempt to lift and fly away with the dummy female but this action brings them into contact with the column. If the insect has pollinia from another orchid on its back, the contained pollen will attach to the sticky stigma. Alternatively, if there are no pollinia on its back, the insect may move backward, receive a coat of glue from the flower's rostellum, then push open the anther and removing any pollinia present, which adhere to the insect's thorax.

== List of species ==
The following is a list of Chiloglottis species accepted by Plants of the World Online as at July 2024:

- Chiloglottis anaticeps D.L.Jones (1991) - duck's-head wasp orchid, bird orchid (N.S.W.)
- Chiloglottis bifaria D.L.Jones (2018) (N.S.W.)
- Chiloglottis chlorantha D.L.Jones (1991) - Wollongong bird orchid (N.S.W.)
- Chiloglottis cornuta Hook.f. (1844) - green bird orchid (N.S.W., Vic., S.A., Tas., N.Z.)
- Chiloglottis curviclavia D.L.Jones (2018) (N.S.W.)
- Chiloglottis diphylla R.Br. (1810) - common wasp orchid (N.S.W., Qld.)
- Chiloglottis formicifera Fitzg. (1877) - common ant orchid (N.S.W.)
- Chiloglottis grammata G.W.Carr (1991) - small bird orchid (Tas.)
- Chiloglottis gunnii Lindl. (1840) - tall bird orchid (Tas.)
- Chiloglottis jeanesii D.L.Jones (1997) - mountain bird orchid (Vic.)
- Chiloglottis longiclavata D.L.Jones (1991) - northern wasp orchid (Qld.)
- Chiloglottis palachila D.L.Jones & M.A.Clem. (1991) - spade-lipped wasp orchid (N.S.W.)
- Chiloglottis × pescottiana R.S.Rogers (1918) - bronze bird orchid (N.S.W., Vic.)
- Chiloglottis platyptera D.L.Jones (1991) - winged ant orchid, Barrington Tops ant orchid (N.S.W.)
- Chiloglottis pluricallata D.L.Jones (1991) - clustered bird orchid (N.S.W.)
- Chiloglottis reflexa (Labill.) Druce (1917) - short-clubbed wasp orchid (N.S.W., Vic.)
- Chiloglottis seminuda D.L.Jones (1991) - turtle orchid (N.S.W., Vic.)
- Chiloglottis sphaerula D.L.Jones (2006) (N.S.W.)
- Chiloglottis sphyrnoides D.L.Jones (1991) - forest wasp orchid (N.S.W., Qld.)
- Chiloglottis sylvestris D.L.Jones & M.A.Clem. (1987) - small wasp orchid (N.S.W., Qld.)
- Chiloglottis trapeziformis Fitzg. (1877) - broad-lip bird orchid, diamond ant orchid, dainty bird-orchid (N.S.W., Qld., Vic., S.A., Tas.)
- Chiloglottis triceratops D.L.Jones (1998) - three-horned bird orchid (Tas.)
- Chiloglottis trilabra Fitzg. (1883) - long-clubbed wasp orchid (N.S.W., Vic.)
- Chiloglottis trullata D.L.Jones (1991) - triangular orchid (Qld.)
- Chiloglottis truncata D.L.Jones & M.A.Clem. (1987) - small ant orchid (Qld.)
- Chiloglottis turfosa D.L.Jones, (1991) - bog bird orchid (N.S.W., A.C.T.)
- Chiloglottis valida D.L.Jones, (1991) - large bird orchid, common bird orchid (N.S.W., A.C.T.)
