= Chiloglottis chlorantha =

Wollongong bird orchid

Scientific classification
- Kingdom: Plantae
- Clade: Embryophytes
- Clade: Tracheophytes
- Clade: Angiosperms
- Clade: Monocots
- Order: Asparagales
- Family: Orchidaceae
- Subfamily: Orchidoideae
- Tribe: Diurideae
- Genus: Chiloglottis
- Species: C. chlorantha

Binomial name
- Chiloglottis chlorantha D.L.Jones

Synonyms
- Simpliglottis chlorantha (D.L.Jones) Szlach.

Species of orchid

Chiloglottis chlorantha, commonly known as the Wollongong bird orchid, is a species of orchid endemic to a small part of New South Wales. It has two broad leaves and a single green to yellowish green flower with about twelve reddish, yellowish or bright green glands on the labellum callus.

== Description ==
Chiloglottis chlorantha is a terrestrial, perennial, deciduous, herb with two elliptic leaves 27–40 mm (1–2 in) long and 10–18 mm (0.4–0.7 in) wide on a petiole 3–6 mm (0.1–0.2 in) long. A single green to yellowish green flower 17–20 mm (0.7–0.8 in) long and 25–30 mm (0.98–1.2 in) wide is borne on a flowering stem 35–55 mm (1–2 in) high. The dorsal sepal is egg-shaped with the narrower end towards the base, 17–20 mm (0.7–0.8 in) long and 6–9 mm (0.2–0.4 in) wide. The lateral sepals are green, 14–16 mm (0.55–0.63 in) long, about 2 mm (0.08 in) wide and erect near the base before curving downwards. There is a glandular tip about 1 mm (0.04 in) long on the sepals. The petals are lance-shaped but curved, 13–15 mm (0.5–0.6 in) long, 4.5–6 mm (0.18–0.24 in) wide and spread widely apart from each other. The labellum is broadly egg-shaped to heart-shaped, 12–13 mm (0.47–0.51 in) long and 9–12 mm (0.4–0.5 in) wide. About two-thirds of the upper surface of the labellum is covered by a callus with about twelve reddish, yellowish or bright green glands up to 3.5 mm (0.1 in) long. The column is green with reddish flecks, 11–12 mm (0.4–0.5 in) long, about 5 mm (0.2 in) wide with broad wings. Flowering occurs in September and October.

== Taxonomy and naming ==
Chiloglottis chlorantha was first formally described in 1991 by David Jones from a specimen collected near Wollongong and the description was published in Australian Orchid Research. The specific epithet (chlorantha) is derived from the Ancient Greek words chloros meaning "green" and anthos meaning "flower", referring to the colour of the flower of this orchid.

== Distribution and habitat ==
The Wollongong bird orchid grows on moist, sheltered slopes under shrubs mainly from near Sydney to the New England.
