= Chiloglottis longiclavata =

Northern wasp orchid

Scientific classification
- Kingdom: Plantae
- Clade: Tracheophytes
- Clade: Angiosperms
- Clade: Monocots
- Order: Asparagales
- Family: Orchidaceae
- Subfamily: Orchidoideae
- Tribe: Diurideae
- Genus: Chiloglottis
- Species: C. longiclavata

Binomial name
- Chiloglottis longiclavata D.L.Jones

Species of orchid

Chiloglottis longiclavata, commonly known as the northern wasp orchid, is a species of orchid endemic to Queensland. It has two leaves and a single narrow, pinkish green flower with a dark blackish red callus covering most of the upper surface of the labellum .

== Description ==
Chiloglottis longiclavata is a terrestrial, perennial, deciduous, herb with two elliptic leaves 25–60 mm (1–2 in) long and 10–20 mm (0.4–0.8 in) wide on a petiole 3–5 mm (0.1–0.2 in) long. A single pinkish green flower 20–25 mm (0.8–1 in) long and 5–6 mm (0.20–0.24 in) wide is borne on a flowering stem 70–100 mm (3–4 in) high. The dorsal sepal is narrow egg-shaped to elliptic with a narrow base, 15–18 mm (0.6–0.7 in) long and about 2.5 mm (0.1 in) wide. The lateral sepals are linear but tapered, 12–15 mm (0.5–0.6 in) long, about 1 mm (0.04 in) wide and erect near the base before curving downwards and spreading apart from each other. There is a glandular tip 4–9 mm (0.2–0.4 in) long on the dorsal sepal and 10–14 mm (0.4–0.6 in) long on the lateral sepals. The petals are lance-shaped to oblong, 7–8 mm (0.28–0.31 in) long, about 2.5 mm (0.1 in) wide and turn downwards against the ovary. The labellum is broadly egg-shaped to diamond-shaped, 7–8 mm (0.28–0.31 in) long and 4–5 mm (0.16–0.20 in) wide. Most of the upper surface of the labellum is covered by a dark blackish red, insect-like callus of stalked and clusters of stalkless glands. The column is pale green with purple flecks, about 6 mm (0.2 in) long, about 2.5 mm (0.1 in) wide with narrow wings. Flowering occurs from February to May.

== Taxonomy and naming ==
Chiloglottis longiclavata was first formally described in 1991 by David Jones from a specimen collected in the Herberton Range and the description was published in Australian Orchid Research. The specific epithet (longiclavata) is derived from the Latin words longus meaning "long" and clavus meaning "club" or "cudgel" referring to the glandular tips on the sepals of this species.

== Distribution and habitat ==
The northern wasp orchid grows in small colonies in tall forests and near rainforest margins on and between the Atherton Tableland and Eungella National Park. On the summit of Mount Bartle Frere it grows in stunted heath.
