= Chiloglottis pluricallata =

Clustered bird orchid

Scientific classification
- Kingdom: Plantae
- Clade: Tracheophytes
- Clade: Angiosperms
- Clade: Monocots
- Order: Asparagales
- Family: Orchidaceae
- Subfamily: Orchidoideae
- Tribe: Diurideae
- Genus: Chiloglottis
- Species: C. pluricallata

Binomial name
- Chiloglottis pluricallata D.L.Jones

Synonyms
- Simpliglottis pluricallata (D.L.Jones) Szlach.

Species of orchid

Chiloglottis pluricallata, commonly known as the clustered bird orchid, is a species of orchid endemic to the New England Tableland and Barrington Tops in New South Wales. It has two broad leaves and a single reddish to purplish brown flower with a callus of about six pairs of reddish to blackish glands covering two-thirds of the top of the labellum.

== Description ==
Chiloglottis pluricallata is a terrestrial, perennial, deciduous, herb with two elliptic leaves 50–80 mm (2–3 in) long and 18–30 mm (0.7–1 in) wide on a petiole 10–18 mm (0.4–0.7 in) long. A single reddish to purplish brown flower 18–22 mm (0.7–0.9 in) long and 25–30 mm (0.98–1.2 in) wide is borne on a flowering stem 50–75 mm (2–3 in) high. The dorsal sepal is egg-shaped with the narrower end towards the base, 19–21 mm (0.75–0.83 in) long and 7–9 mm (0.3–0.4 in) wide. The lateral sepals are 15–18 mm (0.6–0.7 in) long, about 2.5 mm (0.1 in) wide and taper towards their ends. There is a glandular tip 2–3 mm (0.08–0.1 in) long on the end of the dorsal sepal and about 1 mm (0.04 in) long on the lateral sepals. The petals are lance-shaped, 15–18 mm (0.6–0.7 in) long, about 4 mm (0.2 in) wide and spread apart from each other. The labellum is broadly heart-shaped, 11–12.5 mm (0.43–0.49 in) long and 9–12 mm (0.4–0.5 in) wide. There are about twelve erect, linear, reddish to blackish glands on a wrinkled callus 4 mm (0.2 in) long covering two-thirds of the labellum near its base. The column is greenish brown with darker markings, 13–15 mm (0.5–0.6 in) long, about 5 mm (0.2 in) wide with narrow wings. Flowering occurs from November to January.

== Taxonomy and naming ==
Chiloglottis pluricallata was first formally described in 1991 by David Jones from a specimen collected at Point Lookout and the description was published in Australian Orchid Research. The specific epithet (pluricallata) is derived from the Latin words plurimus meaning "most" and callus meaning "hard skin", referring to the many glands on the labellum of this orchid.

== Distribution and habitat ==
The clustered bird orchid grows in grassy forest in mountainous areas on Barringon Tops and the New England Tableland.
