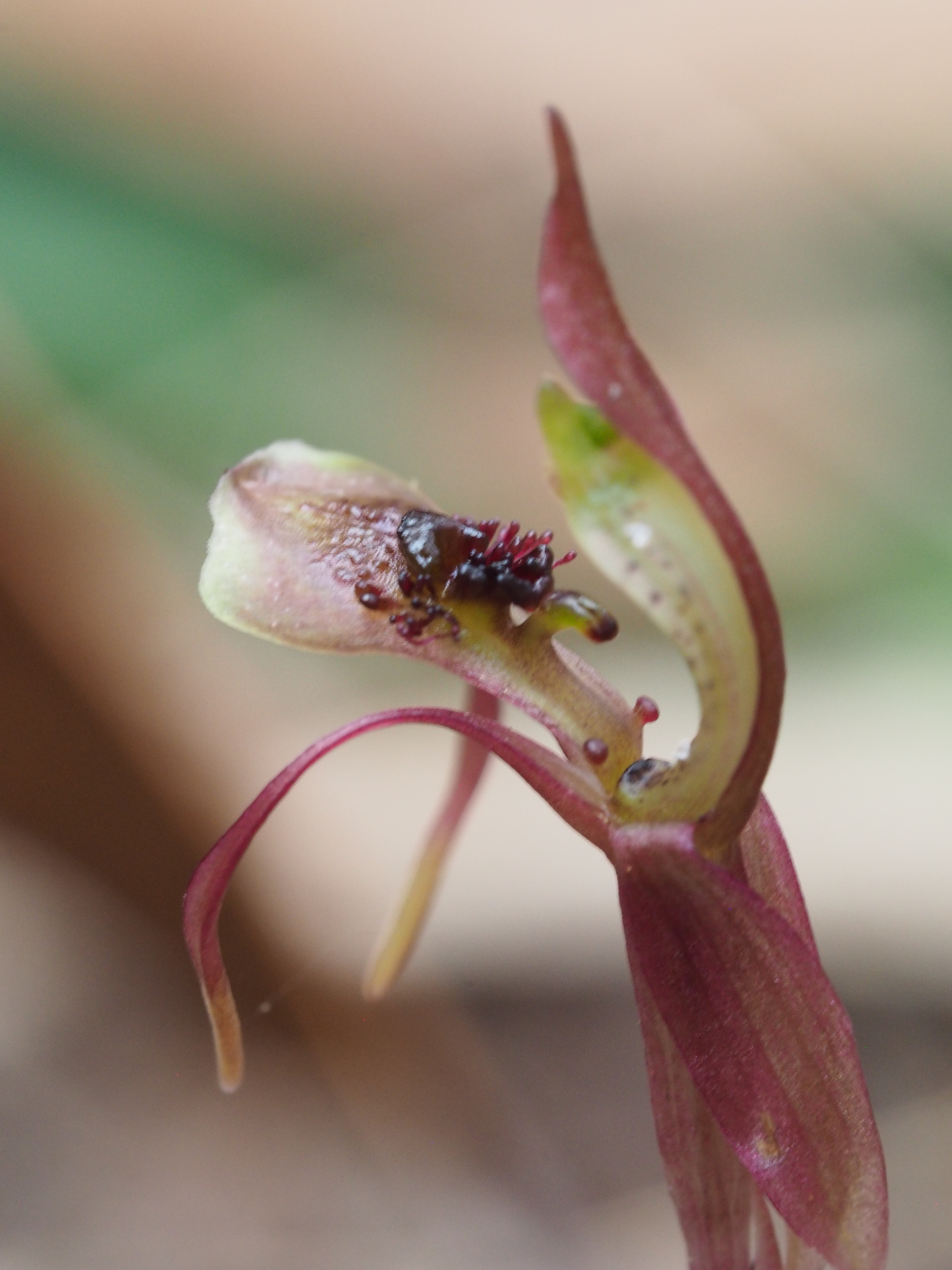
- In Bongil Bongil National Park

Scientific classification
- Kingdom: Plantae
- Clade: Tracheophytes
- Clade: Angiosperms
- Clade: Monocots
- Order: Asparagales
- Family: Orchidaceae
- Subfamily: Orchidoideae
- Tribe: Diurideae
- Genus: Chiloglottis
- Species: C. sylvestris

Binomial name
- Chiloglottis sylvestris D.L.Jones & M.A.Clem.

= Chiloglottis sylvestris =

Small wasp orchid

Species of orchid

Chiloglottis sylvestris, commonly known as small wasp orchid, is a small, delicate species of orchid endemic to eastern Australia. It has two dark green leaves and a single greenish pink flower with a reddish black, insect-like callus surrounded by fine, radiating, red, club-shaped calli on two-thirds of the base of the labellum.

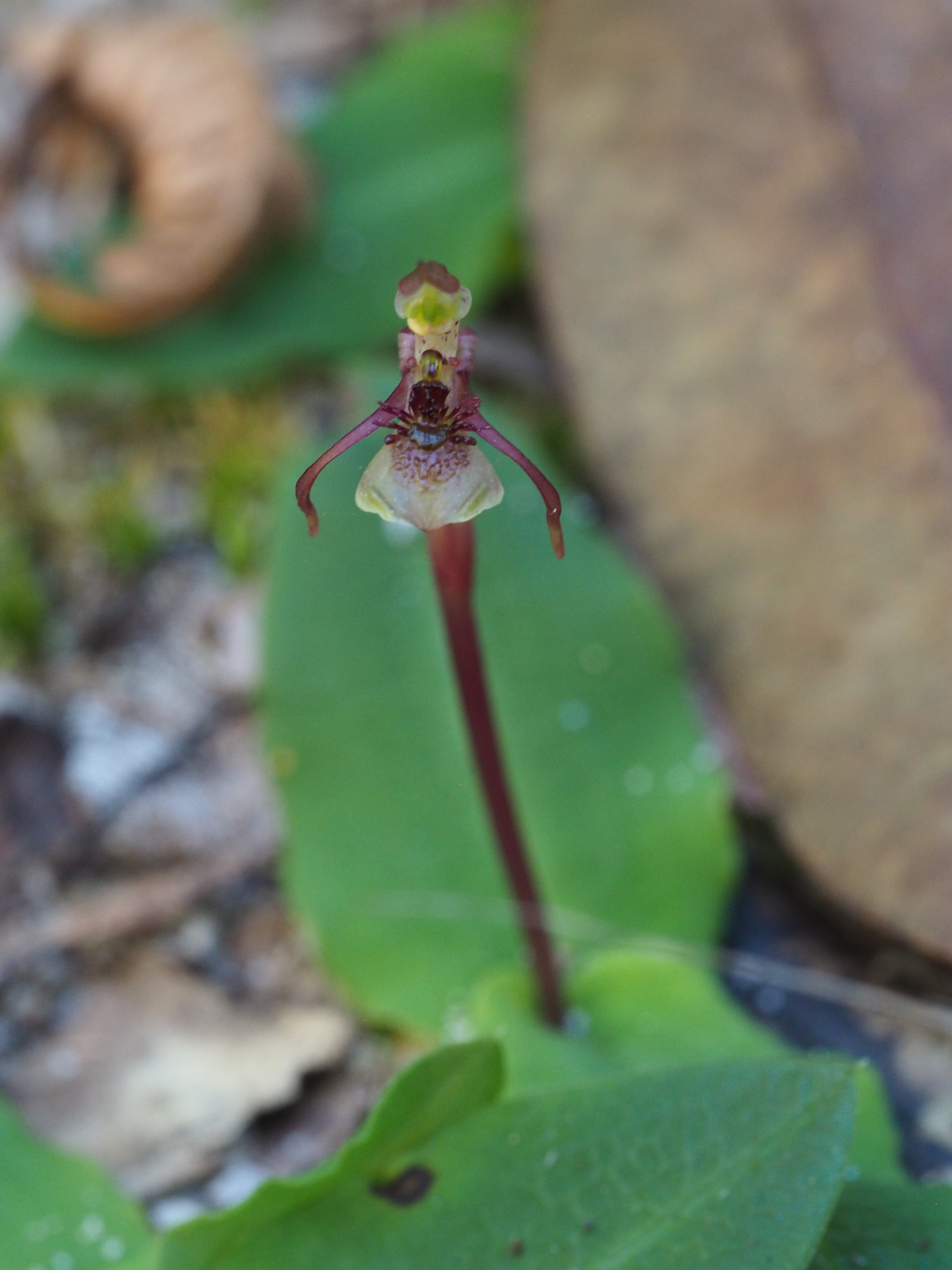
Chiloglottis sylvestris habit

== Description ==
Chiloglottis sylvestris is a terrestrial, perennial, deciduous, herb with two leaves 30–60 mm (1–2 in) long and 12–20 mm (0.5–0.8 in) wide. A single greenish pink flower 20–26 mm (0.8–1 in) long and 5–6 mm (0.20–0.24 in) wide is borne on a flowering stem 30–50 mm (1–2 in) high. The dorsal sepal is linear to spatula-shaped, 10–13 mm (0.4–0.5 in) long and 2–2.5 mm (0.08–0.1 in) wide. The lateral sepals are linear, 10–14 mm (0.4–0.6 in) long, about 0.5 mm (0.02 in) wide and curve downwards and away from each other. There is a glandular tip 2–3 mm (0.08–0.1 in) long on all three sepals. The petals are lance-shaped, 7–10 mm (0.3–0.4 in) long, about 2 mm (0.08 in) wide and turn downwards towards the ovary. The labellum is diamond-shaped, 7–10 mm (0.3–0.4 in) long and 5–6 mm (0.20–0.24 in) wide. There is a reddish black, insect-like callus covering about two-thirds of the middle of the base of the labellum. This large callus is surrounded by many fine, radiating, reddish, club-shaped calli and smaller red calli. The column has narrow wings. Flowering occurs from December to May.

== Taxonomy and naming ==
Chiloglottis sylvestris was first formally described in 1987 by David Jones and Mark Clements from a specimen collected near Springbrook and the description was published in Proceedings of the Royal Society of Queensland. The specific epithet (sylvestris) is a Latin word meaning "of woods".

== Distribution and habitat ==
Small wasp orchid grows in moist places in tall forest and rainforest between Eungella in Queensland and Robertson in New South Wales.

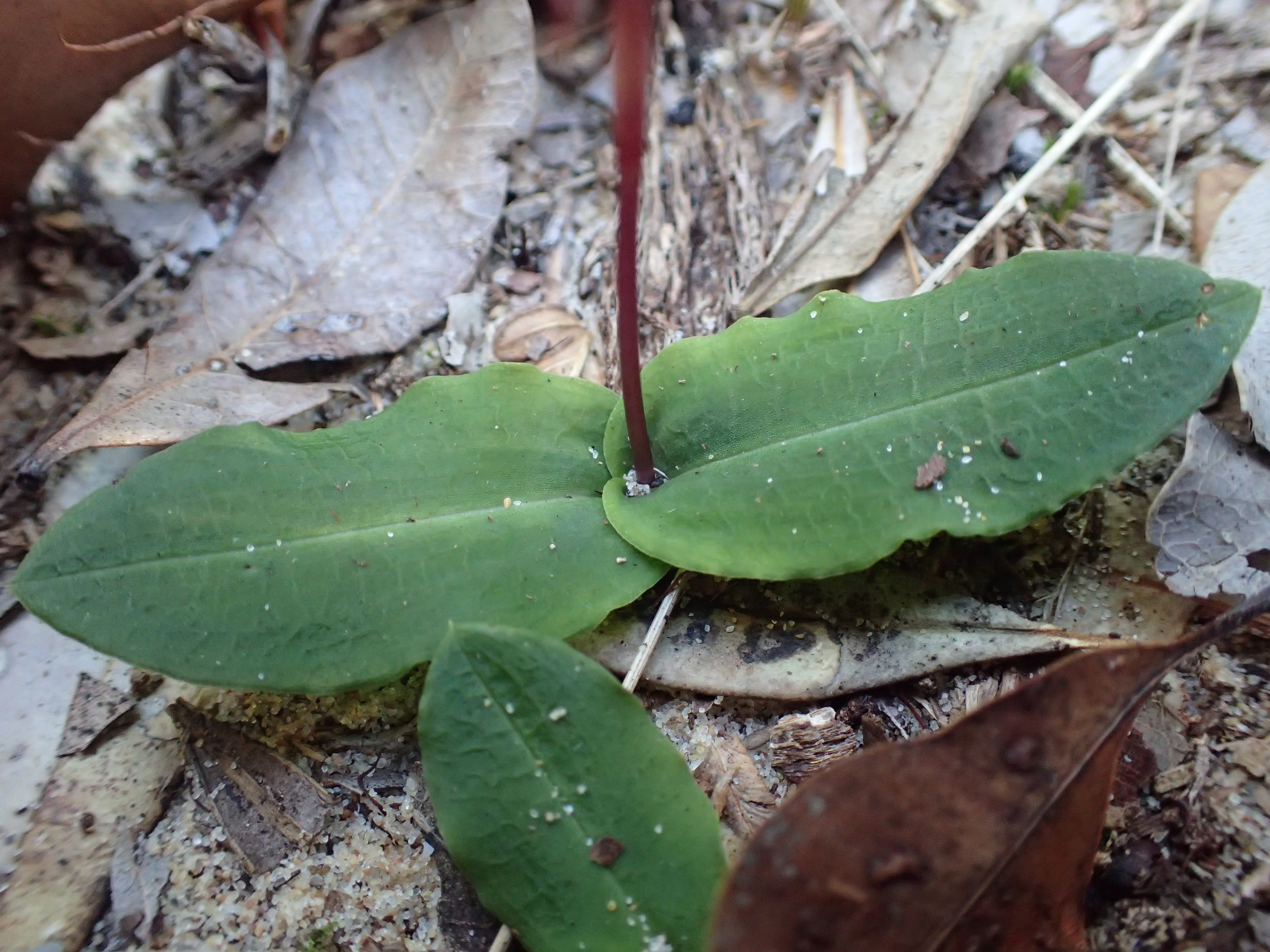
Leaves of C. sylvestris
