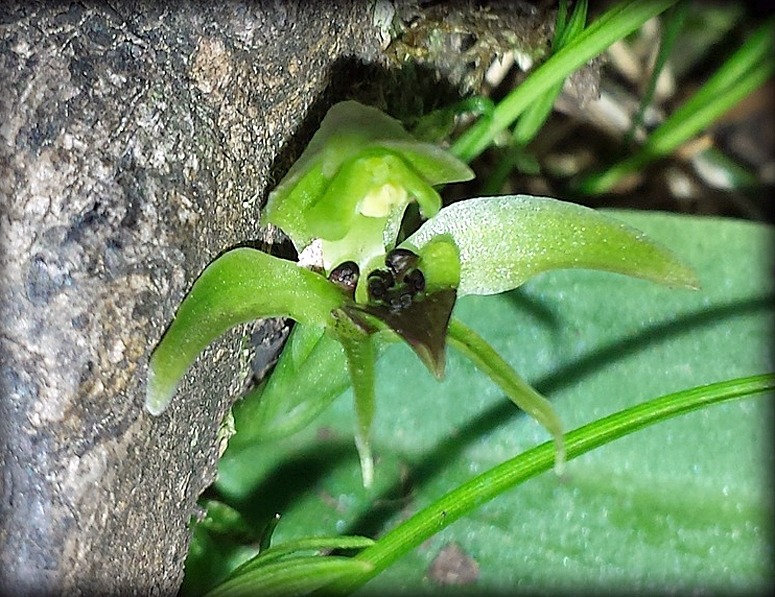

Scientific classification
- Kingdom: Plantae
- Clade: Tracheophytes
- Clade: Angiosperms
- Clade: Monocots
- Order: Asparagales
- Family: Orchidaceae
- Subfamily: Orchidoideae
- Tribe: Diurideae
- Genus: Chiloglottis
- Species: C. cornuta

Binomial name
- Chiloglottis cornuta Hook.f.

Synonyms
- Caladenia cornuta (Hook.f.) Rchb.f.; Simpliglottis cornuta (Hook.f.) Szlach.; Chiloglottis muelleri Fitzg.

= Chiloglottis cornuta =

Green bird orchid

Species of orchid

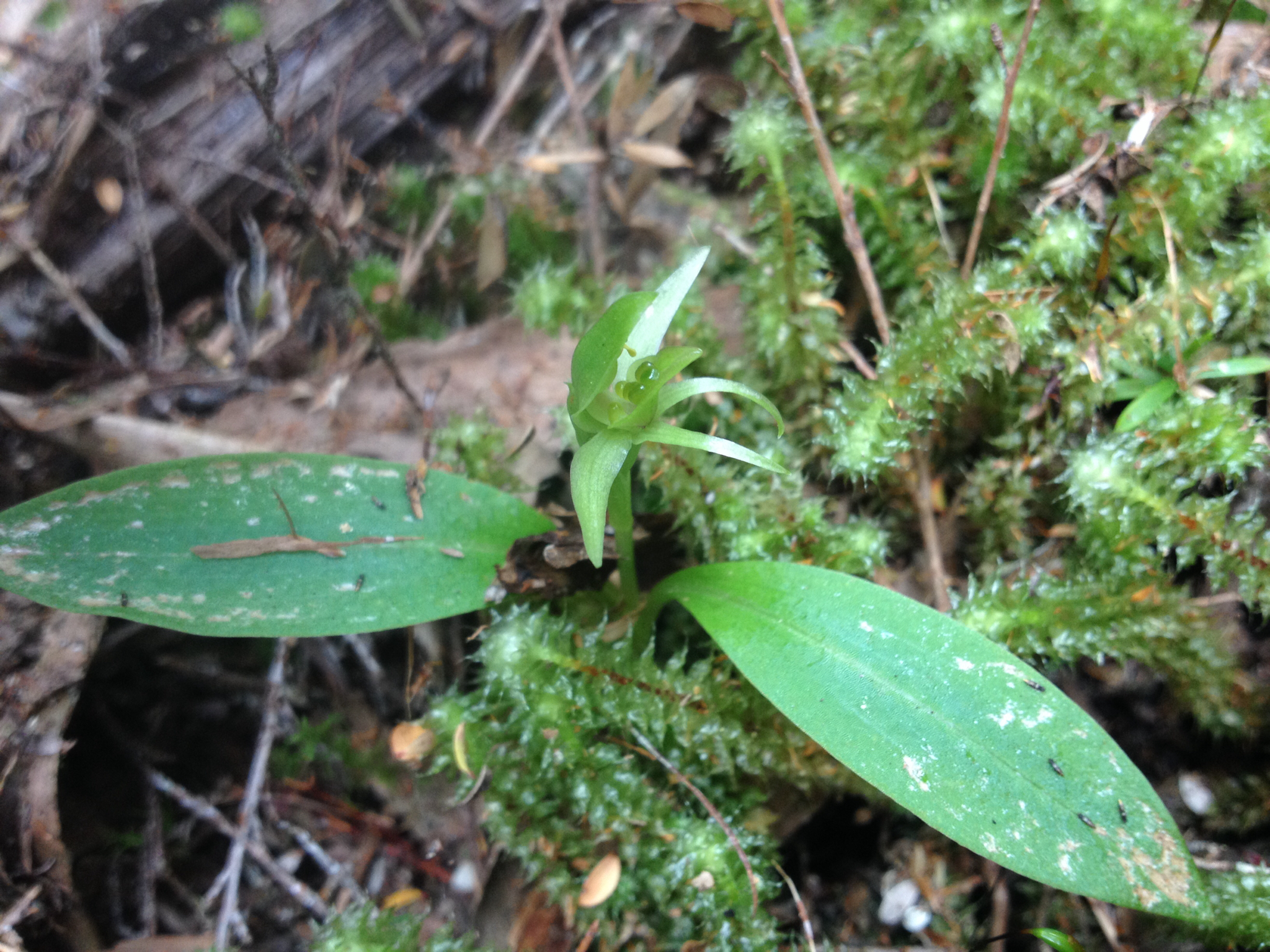
Side view showing characteristic flattened glands on labellum.

Chiloglottis cornuta, commonly known as the green bird orchid, is a species of orchid found in south-eastern Australia and in New Zealand, including many of its offshore islands. It has two broad leaves and a single green or pinkish flower with six to eight rounded, flattened green, reddish or blackish calli on the labellum.

== Description ==
Chiloglottis cornuta is a terrestrial, perennial, deciduous, herb with two elliptic leaves 60–100 mm (2–4 in) long and 20–30 mm (0.8–1 in) wide on a petiole 5–10 mm (0.2–0.4 in) long. A single green to reddish flower 13–16 mm (0.5–0.6 in) long and 25–30 mm (0.98–1.2 in) wide is borne on a flowering stem 40–100 mm (2–4 in) high. The dorsal sepal is lance-shaped to egg-shaped, 13–16 mm (0.5–0.6 in) long and 5–7 mm (0.2–0.3 in) wide. The lateral sepals are 10–12 mm (0.4–0.5 in) long, about 3 mm (0.1 in) wide and curve forwards. There is a glandular tip about 1 mm (0.04 in) long on the sepals. The petals are linear to lance-shaped, 10–12 mm (0.4–0.5 in) long, about 3.5 mm (0.1 in) wide and spread widely apart from each other. The labellum is heart-shaped, 9–12 mm (0.4–0.5 in) long and 7–8 mm (0.28–0.31 in) wide with six to eight rounded dark red, green, reddish or blackish calli. The column is erect, almost as long as the dorsal sepal with broad wings on the upper half. Flowering occurs from November to February.

== Taxonomy and naming ==
Chiloglottis cornuta was first formally described in 1844 by Joseph Dalton Hooker from a specimen collected near "Campbell's Island" and the description was published in Flora Antarctica. The specific epithet (cornuta) is a Latin word meaning "bearing horns".

== Distribution and habitat ==
The green bird orchid grows in moist places in sheltered forest in far south-eastern New South Wales, eastern Victoria, far south-eastern South Australia and in Tasmania. In New Zealand it occurs on both the North and South Islands and on Stewart, Chatham, the Antipodes, Campbell and Auckland Islands.
