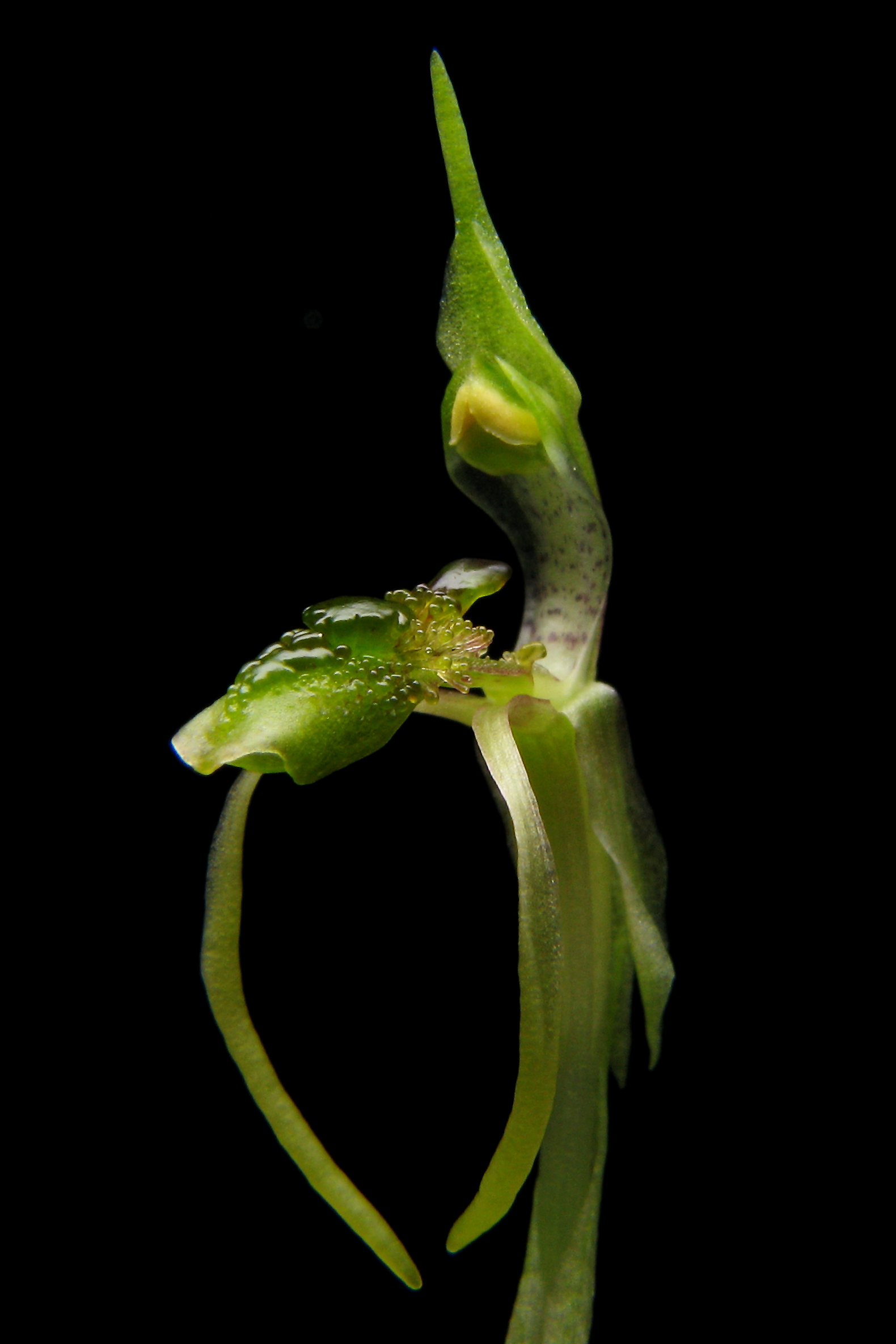

Scientific classification
- Kingdom: Plantae
- Clade: Tracheophytes
- Clade: Angiosperms
- Clade: Monocots
- Order: Asparagales
- Family: Orchidaceae
- Subfamily: Orchidoideae
- Tribe: Diurideae
- Genus: Chiloglottis
- Species: C. diphylla

Binomial name
- Chiloglottis diphylla R.Br.

Synonyms
- Caladenia diphylla (R.Br.) Rchb.f.

= Chiloglottis diphylla =

Common wasp orchid

Species of orchid

Chiloglottis diphylla, commonly known as common wasp orchid, is a species of orchid endemic to Australia. It has two broad leaves and a single narrow, greenish brown to reddish flower with a black, insect-like callus covering the upper surface of the labellum.

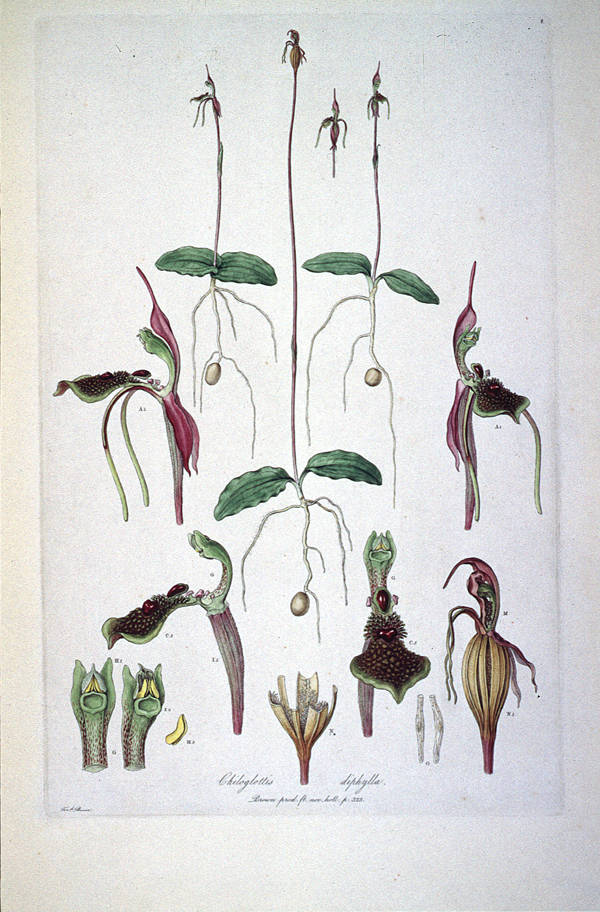
Chiloglottis diphylla - 1810 illustration by Ferdinand Bauer

== Description ==
Chiloglottis diphylla is a terrestrial, perennial, deciduous, herb with two leaves 30–60 mm (1–2 in) long and 10–15 mm (0.4–0.6 in) wide. A single greenish brown to reddish flower 30–45 mm (1–2 in) long and 4–5 mm (0.16–0.20 in) wide is borne on a flowering stem 70–100 mm (3–4 in) high. The dorsal sepal is spatula-shaped, 12–14 mm (0.5–0.6 in) long and about 2 mm (0.08 in) wide with a glandular tip a further 3–4 mm (0.1–0.2 in) long. The lateral sepals are 15–22 mm (0.6–0.9 in) long, about 0.5 mm (0.02 in) wide and curve downwards. There is a glandular tip 7–10 mm (0.3–0.4 in) long on the end of each lateral sepal. The petals are oblong, 7–9 mm (0.3–0.4 in) long, about 2 mm (0.08 in) wide and turned strongly downwards. The labellum is diamond-shaped, 7–10 mm (0.3–0.4 in) long and 4–5 mm (0.16–0.20 in) wide with a black, insect-like callus covering most of its upper surface. Flowering occurs from February to May.

== Taxonomy and naming ==
Chiloglottis diphylla was first formally described in 1810 by Robert Brown and the description was published in Prodromus Florae Novae Hollandiae et Insulae Van Diemen.

== Distribution and habitat ==
Common wasp orchid grows in moist places in shrubby forest on the coast and ranges between Carnarvon Gorge in Queensland and Batemans Bay in New South Wales.
