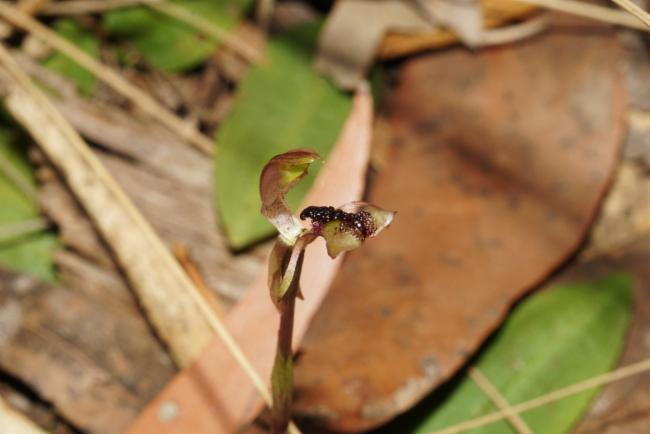

Scientific classification
- Kingdom: Plantae
- Clade: Tracheophytes
- Clade: Angiosperms
- Clade: Monocots
- Order: Asparagales
- Family: Orchidaceae
- Subfamily: Orchidoideae
- Tribe: Diurideae
- Genus: Chiloglottis
- Species: C. platyptera

Binomial name
- Chiloglottis platyptera D.L.Jones

Synonyms
- Myrmechila platyptera (D.L.Jones) D.L.Jones & M.A.Clem.

= Chiloglottis platyptera =

Winged ant orchid

Species of orchid

Chiloglottis platyptera, commonly known as the winged ant orchid or Barrington Tops ant orchid, is a species of orchid endemic to the New England Tableland of New South Wales. It has two broad leaves and a single greenish brown flower with a callus of many glands covering most of the top of the labellum.

== Description ==
Chiloglottis platyptera is a terrestrial, perennial, deciduous, herb with two elliptic to oblong leaves 40–75 mm (2–3 in) long and 14–22 mm (0.6–0.9 in) wide on a petiole 3–8 mm (0.1–0.3 in) long. A single greenish brown flower 10–12 mm (0.4–0.5 in) long and 8–9 mm (0.31–0.35 in) wide is borne on a flowering stem 50–100 mm (2–4 in) high. The dorsal sepal is spatula-shaped, more or less erect, about 13 mm (0.5 in) long and 3 mm (0.1 in) wide. The lateral sepals are linear, 7–10 mm (0.3–0.4 in) long, about 1 mm (0.04 in) wide, spread apart from each other and curve downwards. There is a glandular tip less than 1 mm (0.04 in) long on all three sepals. The petals are lance-shaped with the narrower end towards the base, about 10 mm (0.4 in) long, 3 mm (0.1 in) wide, slightly curved and turned down against the sides of the ovary. The labellum is shaped like a bricklayer's trowel with the narrower end towards the base. It is 9–10 mm (0.35–0.39 in) long, about 8 mm (0.3 in) wide and most of the upper surface of the labellum is covered with a callus of many short reddish, yellowish, bright green or black glands, the one nearest the base of the labellum about 1.5 mm (0.06 in) long and shaped like handlebars. The column is pale green with purple streaks, about 9 mm (0.4 in) long, 6 mm (0.2 in) wide with broad wings. Flowering occurs from September to November.

== Taxonomy and naming ==
Chiloglottis platyptera was first formally described in 1991 by David Jones from a specimen collected in Barrington Tops National Park and the description was published in Australian Orchid Research. The specific epithet (platyptera) is derived from the Ancient Greek words platys meaning "broad, wide, flat (or) level" and pteron meaning "feather" or "wing", referring to the brown wings on the column of this orchid.

== Distribution and habitat ==
The winged ant orchid grows with grass in tall forest and on the edges of rainforest between Dungog and Yarrowitch, including in the Barrington Tops, Oxley Wild Rivers and Ben Halls Gap National Parks.

== Conservation ==
Chiloglottis platyptera is listed as "vulnerable" under the New South Wales Government Biodiversity Conservation Act 2016. The main threats to the species are grazing by domestic stock, weed invasion (especially by scotch broom), the activities of feral pigs and land clearing.
