= Chiloglottis trullata =

Triangular ant orchid

Scientific classification
- Kingdom: Plantae
- Clade: Tracheophytes
- Clade: Angiosperms
- Clade: Monocots
- Order: Asparagales
- Family: Orchidaceae
- Subfamily: Orchidoideae
- Tribe: Diurideae
- Genus: Chiloglottis
- Species: C. trullata

Binomial name
- Chiloglottis trullata D.L.Jones

Synonyms
- Myrmechila trullata (D.L.Jones) D.L.Jones & M.A.Clem.

Species of orchid

Chiloglottis trullata, commonly known as the triangular ant orchid, is a species of orchid endemic to Queensland, Australia. It has two dark green leaves and a single small, green or pinkish flower with a shiny, dark reddish black, insect-like callus surrounded by reddish club-shaped calli covering most of the upper surface of the labellum.

== Description ==
Chiloglottis trullata is a terrestrial, perennial, deciduous, herb with two ground-hugging, dark green, oblong to elliptic leaves 50–80 mm (2–3 in) long and 15–25 mm (0.6–1 in) wide on a petiole 3–5 mm (0.1–0.2 in) long. A single green or pinkish flower 8–10 mm (0.3–0.4 in) long and 5–6 mm (0.20–0.24 in) wide is borne on a flowering stem 50–75 mm (2–3 in) high. The dorsal sepal is spatula-shaped, 10–11 mm (0.39–0.43 in) long and about 2 mm (0.08 in) wide. The lateral sepals are linear, 9–10 mm (0.35–0.39 in) long, about 1 mm (0.04 in) wide and curve downwards and away from each other. There is a glandular tip about 1 mm (0.04 in) long on the end of all three sepals. The petals are linear to lance-shaped with the narrower end towards the base, 8–9 mm (0.3–0.4 in) long, about 2.5 mm (0.1 in) wide and turn downwards towards the ovary. The labellum is broadly trowel-shaped, 7–8 mm (0.28–0.31 in) long and 5–6 mm (0.20–0.24 in) wide. There is a shiny, dark reddish black, insect-like callus with a handlebar-shaped, stalked "head" end about 1.5 mm (0.06 in) long and 2 mm (0.08 in) wide. The callus and associated glands occupy most of the upper surface of the labellum. The column is pale green with a few purple spots, 7–8 mm (0.28–0.31 in) long and about 3 mm (0.1 in) wide with narrow wings. Flowering occurs in July and August.

== Taxonomy and naming ==
Chiloglottis trullata was first formally described in 1991 by David Jones from a specimen collected in the Blackdown Tableland National Park and the description was published in Australian Orchid Research. The specific epithet (trullata) is a Latin word meaning "trowel", referring to the shape of the labellum.

== Distribution and habitat ==
The triangular ant orchid grows near sandstone boulder in tall forest on the Blackdown Tableland.
