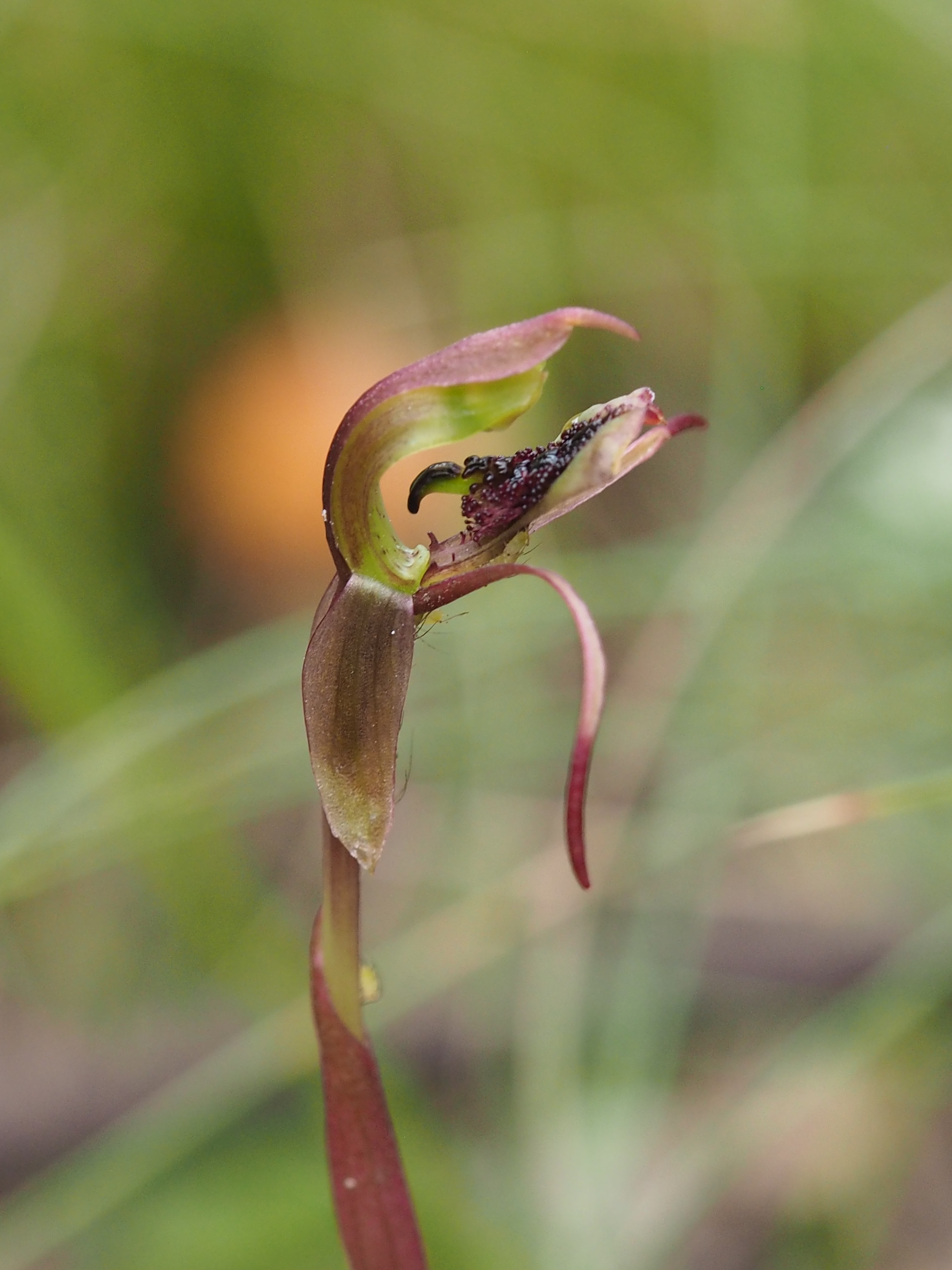
- Chiloglottis anaticeps in Cathedral Rock National Park

Scientific classification
- Kingdom: Plantae
- Clade: Tracheophytes
- Clade: Angiosperms
- Clade: Monocots
- Order: Asparagales
- Family: Orchidaceae
- Subfamily: Orchidoideae
- Tribe: Diurideae
- Genus: Chiloglottis
- Species: C. anaticeps

Binomial name
- Chiloglottis anaticeps D.L.Jones

= Chiloglottis anaticeps =

Duck's-head wasp orchid

Species of orchid

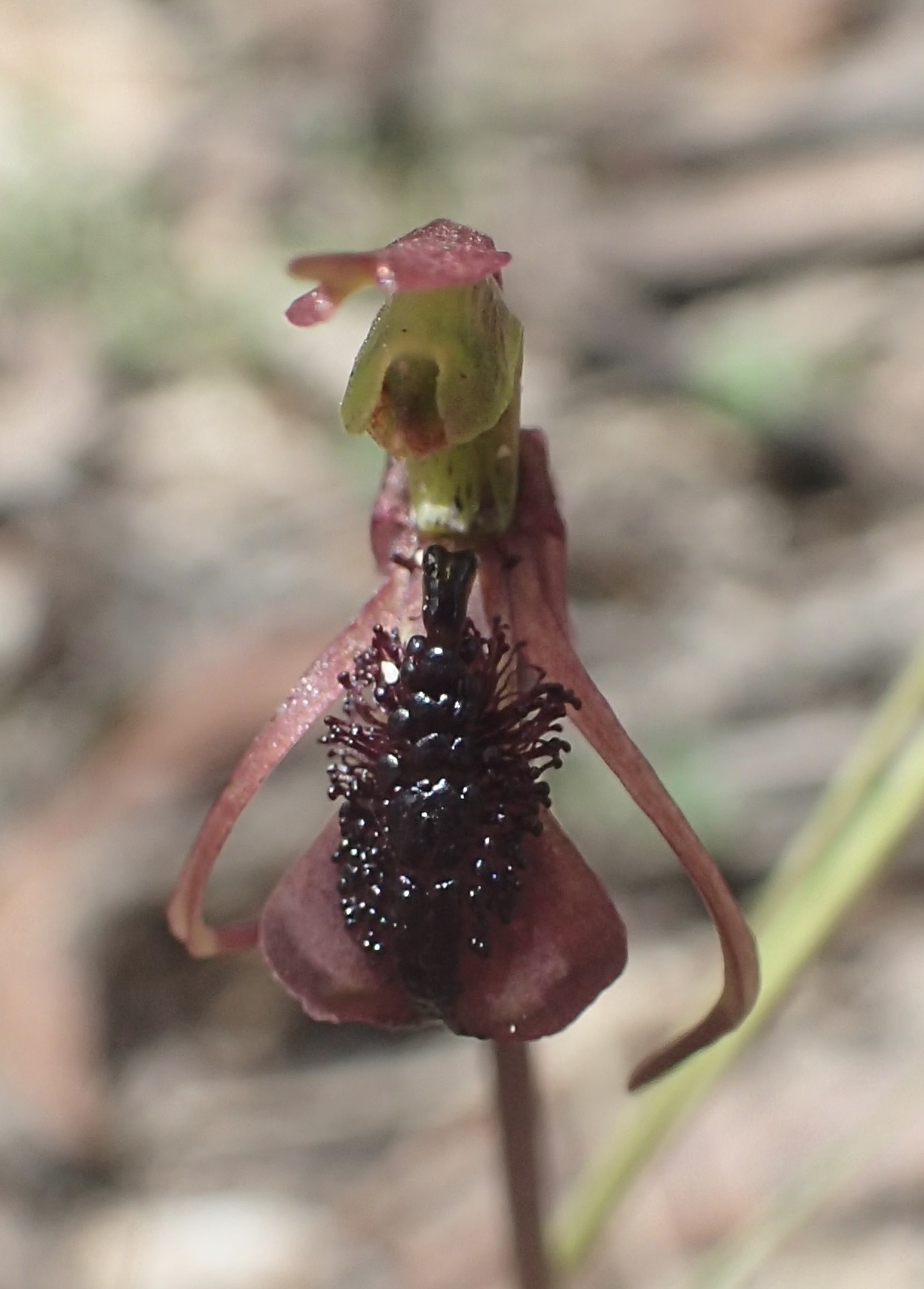
Labellum detail

Chiloglottis anaticeps, commonly known as the duck's-head wasp orchid or bird orchid is a species of orchid endemic to the New England Tableland of New South Wales. It has two narrow leaves and a single greenish brown or reddish flower with a shiny, dark green callus occupying most of the top of the labellum. One end of the callus looks like a tiny duck's head.

== Description ==
Chiloglottis anaticeps is a terrestrial, perennial, deciduous, herb with two narrow elliptic to egg-shaped leaves 30–40 mm (1–2 in) long and 14–18 mm (0.6–0.7 in) wide on a petiole 10–25 mm (0.4–1 in) long. A single green to reddish brown flower 26–30 mm (1.0–1.2 in) long and 5–6 mm (0.20–0.24 in) wide is borne on a flowering stem 35–70 mm (1–3 in) high. The dorsal sepal is 12–14 mm (0.5–0.6 in) long, about 2 mm (0.08 in) wide with a narrow glandular tip a further 3–4 mm (0.1–0.2 in) long. The lateral sepals are linear, 16–18 mm (0.6–0.7 in) long, about 1 mm (0.04 in) wide and curve downwards with a glandular tip 5–7 mm (0.2–0.3 in) long. The petals are lance-shaped, 10–12 mm (0.4–0.5 in) long, about 3 mm (0.1 in) wide and pressed against the sides of the ovary. The labellum is held horizontally, 9–11 mm (0.35–0.43 in) long and 5–6 mm (0.20–0.24 in) wide. Most of the upper surface of the labellum is covered with a callus of prominent, club-shaped, stalked glands, the one nearest the base of the labellum about 2 mm (0.08 in) long and shaped like a tiny duck's head. The column is green with red spots on the front, 8–9 mm (0.3–0.4 in) long, about 3 mm (0.1 in) wide with broad wings. Flowering occurs from December to February.

== Taxonomy and naming ==
Chiloglottis anaticeps was first formally described in 1991 by David Jones from a specimen collected west of Wauchope and the description was published in Australian Orchid Research. The specific epithet (anaticeps) means "duck-headed" and refers to the stalked gland on the labellum.

== Distribution and habitat ==
The duck's-head wasp orchid grows in tall forest and near granite outcrops in the New England, Werrikimbe and Cathedral Rock National Parks.

== Conservation ==
Chiloglottis anaticeps is listed as "endangered" under the New South Wales Government Biodiversity Conservation Act 2016.
