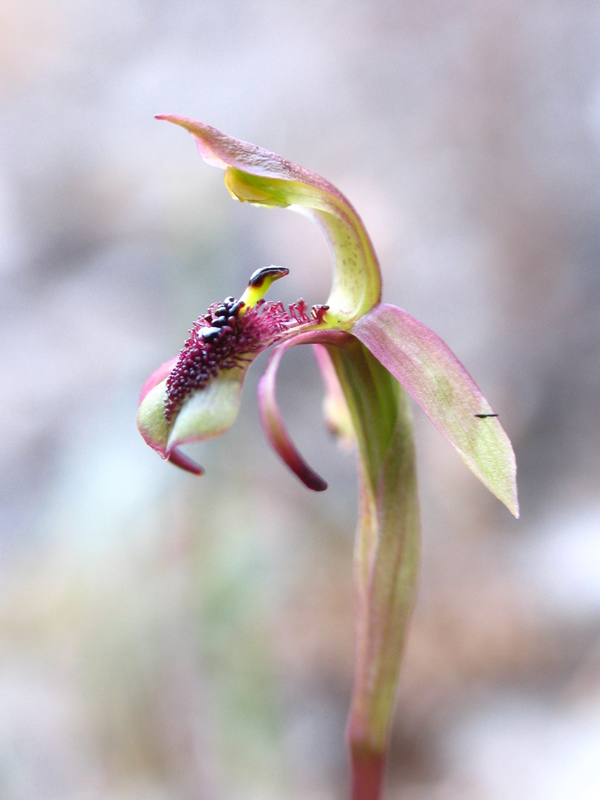
- Chiloglottis reflexa near Steiglitz

Scientific classification
- Kingdom: Plantae
- Clade: Tracheophytes
- Clade: Angiosperms
- Clade: Monocots
- Order: Asparagales
- Family: Orchidaceae
- Subfamily: Orchidoideae
- Tribe: Diurideae
- Genus: Chiloglottis
- Species: C. reflexa

Binomial name
- Chiloglottis reflexa (Labill.) Druce

Synonyms
- Acianthus bifolius R.Br. nom. illeg., nom. superfl.; Arethusa reflexa (Labill.) Sw.; Chiloglottis sp. 1; Cyrtostylis reflexa (Labill.) Spreng.; Epipactis reflexa Labill.; Chiloglottis diphylla auct. non R.Br.: Rodway, L. (1903); Chiloglottis trilabra auct. non Fitzg.: Jones, D.L. in Banks, D.P. (ed.) (1998)

= Chiloglottis reflexa =

Short-clubbed wasp orchid

Species of orchid

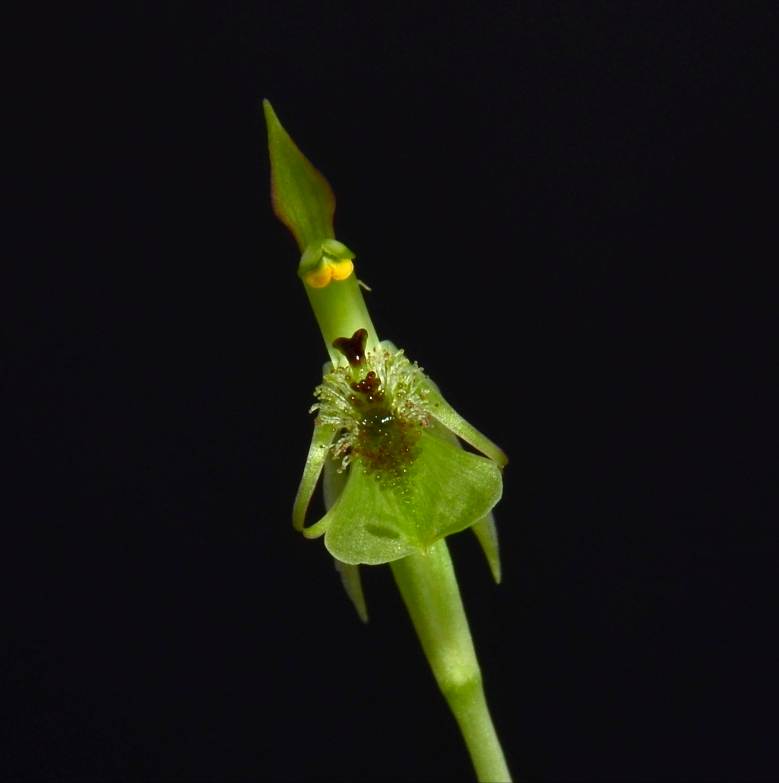
Chiloglottis reflexa (green form) in cultivation

Chiloglottis reflexa, commonly known as the short-clubbed wasp orchid, is a species of orchid endemic to the south-eastern Australia. It has two broad leaves and a single greenish-bronze or purplish flower with an ant-like callus covering most of the top of the labellum.

== Description ==
Chiloglottis reflexa is a terrestrial, perennial, deciduous, herb with two egg-shaped to elliptic leaves 20–60 mm (0.8–2 in) long and 10–30 mm (0.4–1 in) wide. A single greenish-bronze or purplish flower 22–28 mm (0.9–1 in) long and 10–12 mm (0.4–0.5 in) wide is borne on a flowering stem 60–100 mm (2–4 in) high. The dorsal sepal is spatula-shaped, 10–15 mm (0.4–0.6 in) long and 2–3.5 mm (0.08–0.1 in) wide. The lateral sepals are linear, 10–13 mm (0.4–0.5 in) long, less than 1 mm (0.04 in) wide and curve downwards. There is a glandular tip 1–2.5 mm (0.04–0.1 in) long on the end of the dorsal sepal and 1.5–3.5 mm (0.06–0.1 in) long on the lateral sepals. The petals are oblong, 8–11 mm (0.3–0.4 in) long, about 2.5 mm (0.1 in) wide and turned downwards near the ovary. The labellum is held horizontally, diamond-shaped, 8–11 mm (0.31–0.43 in) long and 5–7 mm (0.2–0.3 in) wide. The callus resembles a large black ant surrounded by thin, stalked glands and covers most of the labellum. The column has narrow wings. Flowering occurs from December to May.

== Taxonomy and naming ==
This orchid species was first formally described in 1806 by Jacques Labillardière who gave it the name Epipactis reflexa and published the description in Novae Hollandiae Plantarum Specimen. In 1917 George Claridge Druce changed the name to Chiloglottis reflexa. The specific epithet (reflexa) is a Latin word meaning "bent" or "turned back".

== Distribution and habitat ==
The short-clubbed wasp orchid grows in a wide range of habitats but is most common in coastal and near-coastal forest and heath. It occurs in New South Wales south from the Blue Mountains, in southern Victoria and in Tasmania.
