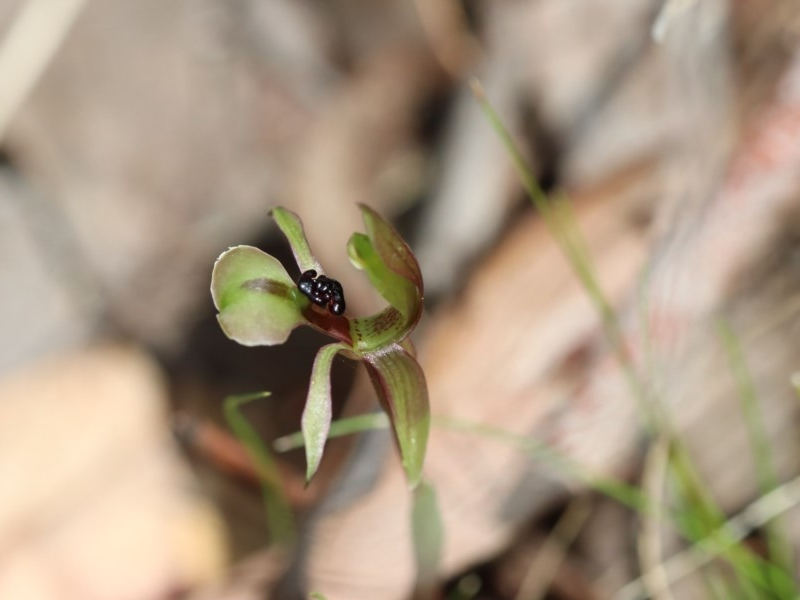
- Near Acton in the A.C.T.

Scientific classification
- Kingdom: Plantae
- Clade: Tracheophytes
- Clade: Angiosperms
- Clade: Monocots
- Order: Asparagales
- Family: Orchidaceae
- Subfamily: Orchidoideae
- Tribe: Diurideae
- Genus: Chiloglottis
- Species: C. trapeziformis

Binomial name
- Chiloglottis trapeziformis Fitzg.

Synonyms
- Chiloglottis trapeziforme Fitzg. orth. var.; Myrmechila trapeziformis (Fitzg.) D.L.Jones & M.A.Clem.

= Chiloglottis trapeziformis =

Broad-lip bird orchid

Species of orchid

Chiloglottis trapeziformis, commonly known as broad-lip bird orchid, diamond ant orchid or dainty bird-orchid, is a species of orchid endemic to south-eastern Australia. It has two narrow leaves and a narrow, greenish to purplish or brownish flower with a short, shiny black, ant-like callus covering the lower quarter of the diamond-shaped labellum. It has been recorded as a vagrant in New Zealand.

== Description ==
Chiloglottis trapeziformis is a terrestrial, perennial, deciduous, herb with two leaves 30–80 mm (1–3 in) long and 10–25 mm (0.4–1 in) wide. A single greenish to purplish or brownish flower 12–16 mm (0.5–0.6 in) long and 6–8 mm (0.2–0.3 in) wide is borne on a flowering stem 80–140 mm (3–6 in) high. The dorsal sepal is spatula-shaped, 11–13 mm (0.4–0.5 in) long and about 3 mm (0.1 in) wide. The lateral sepals are linear, 9–12 mm (0.35–0.47 in) long, 1–2.5 mm (0.04–0.1 in) wide and curve downwards and away from each other. There is a glandular tip about 0.5 mm (0.02 in) long on the end of all three sepals. The petals are oblong or broadly linear in shape, 8–15 mm (0.3–0.6 in) long, 3–4 mm (0.1–0.2 in) wide and turned downwards near the ovary. The labellum is erect, diamond-shaped, 7–12 mm (0.3–0.5 in) long and 6–8 mm (0.2–0.3 in) wide with a narrow, shiny black, ant-like callus covering one quarter of its upper surface. Flowering occurs from August to November.

== Taxonomy and naming ==
Chiloglottis trapeziformis was first formally described in 1877 by Robert D. FitzGerald and the description was published in his book Australian Orchids from a specimen collected "at Liverpool".

== Distribution and habitat ==
Broad-lip bird orchid is widespread and common in sheltered sites in a wide range of habitats. It occurs in south-eastern Queensland, eastern New South Wales and eastern Victoria. There is a single small population in south-eastern South Australia and scattered populations at Wynyard, Launceston, Flinders Island and Great Dog Island in Tasmania. A single vagrant population, now extinct, was known from a pine plantation near Levin in New Zealand.

== Conservation ==
Chiloglottis trapeziformis is listed as "endangered" in Tasmania under the Threatened Species Protection Act 1995.
