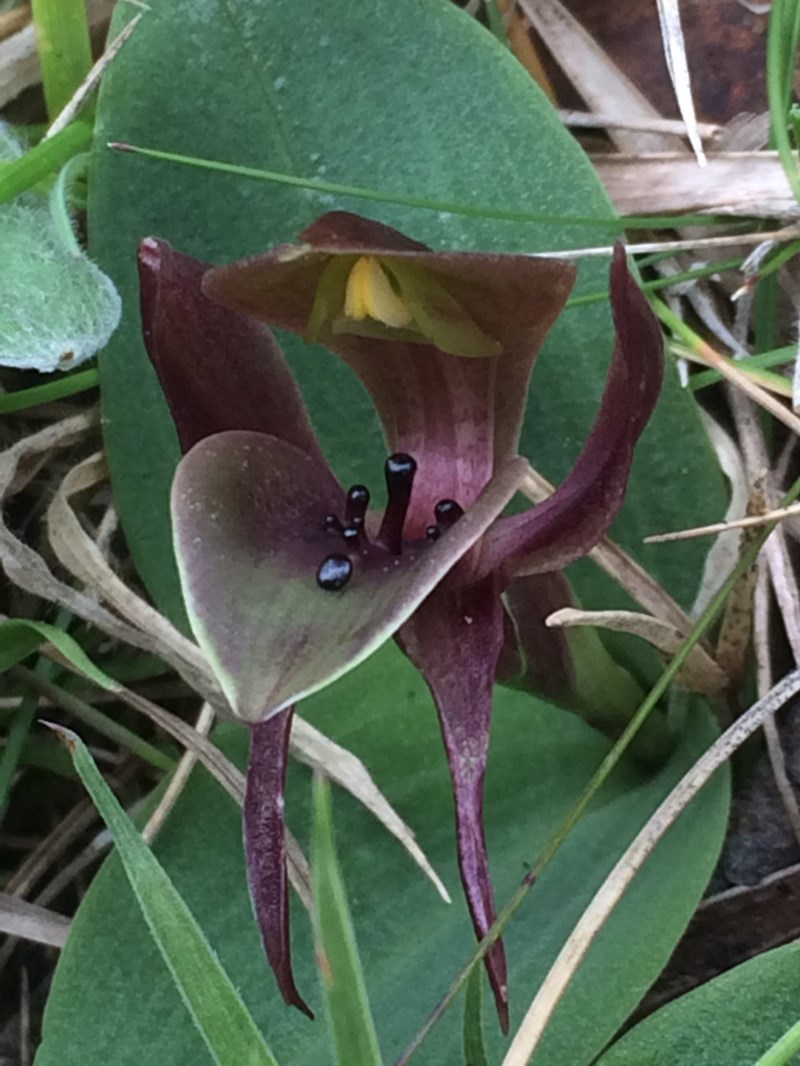

Scientific classification
- Kingdom: Plantae
- Clade: Tracheophytes
- Clade: Angiosperms
- Clade: Monocots
- Order: Asparagales
- Family: Orchidaceae
- Subfamily: Orchidoideae
- Tribe: Diurideae
- Genus: Chiloglottis
- Species: C. valida

Binomial name
- Chiloglottis valida D.L.Jones

Synonyms
- Simpliglottis valida (D.L.Jones) Szlach.

= Chiloglottis valida =

Large bird orchid

Species of orchid

Chiloglottis valida, commonly known as large bird orchid or common bird orchid, is a species of orchid endemic to south-eastern Australia.It has two dark green leaves and a single greenish purple to purplish brown flower with six to ten blackish, column-like calli on the labellum.

== Description ==
Chiloglottis valida is a terrestrial, perennial, deciduous, herb with two dark green broad elliptic leaves 50–100 mm (2–4 in) long and 20–40 mm (0.8–2 in) wide. A single greenish purple to purplish brown flower 20–30 mm (0.8–1 in) long and 30–35 mm (1.2–1.4 in) wide is borne on a flowering stem 40–70 mm (2–3 in) high. The dorsal sepal is spatula-shaped, to egg-shaped with the narrower end towards the base, 19–30 mm (0.7–1 in) long and 4–7 mm (0.2–0.3 in) wide. The lateral sepals are linear, tapering towards the tip, 17–25 mm (0.7–1 in) long, 3–4 mm (0.1–0.2 in) wide, curve downwards and away from each other. There is a glandular tip about 1–2.5 mm (0.04–0.1 in) long on the end of the dorsal sepal and about 1 mm (0.04 in) long on the lateral sepals. The petals are egg-shaped to lance-shaped, 17–23 mm (0.7–0.9 in) long, 8–11 mm (0.3–0.4 in) wide, spread apart from each other and curve upwards and inwards towards the labellum. The labellum is broadly heart-shaped, 14–18.5 mm (0.6–0.7 in) long and 12–16 mm (0.5–0.6 in) wide. There is a large, black, column-like callus up to 4 mm (0.2 in) long, surrounded by between one and four pairs of smaller calli on the labellum. The column is greenish brown with darker marks, 13–17 mm (0.5–0.7 in) long and about 8 mm (0.3 in) wide with broad wings. Flowering occurs from October to February.

== Taxonomy and naming ==
Chiloglottis valida was first formally described in 1991 by David Jones from a specimen collected in Namadgi National Park and the description was published in Australian Orchid Research. The specific epithet (valida) is a Latin word meaning "strong", "sound" or "powerful", in reference to this species being the largest in the genus.

== Distribution and habitat ==
Large bird orchid is widespread and common, growing in a range of habitats from coastal to subalpine areas. It is most common in Victoria where it grows throughout the state, except in the far west. In New South Wales and the Australian Capital Territory it is found south from the Brindabella Range and it grows on King Island in Tasmania.
