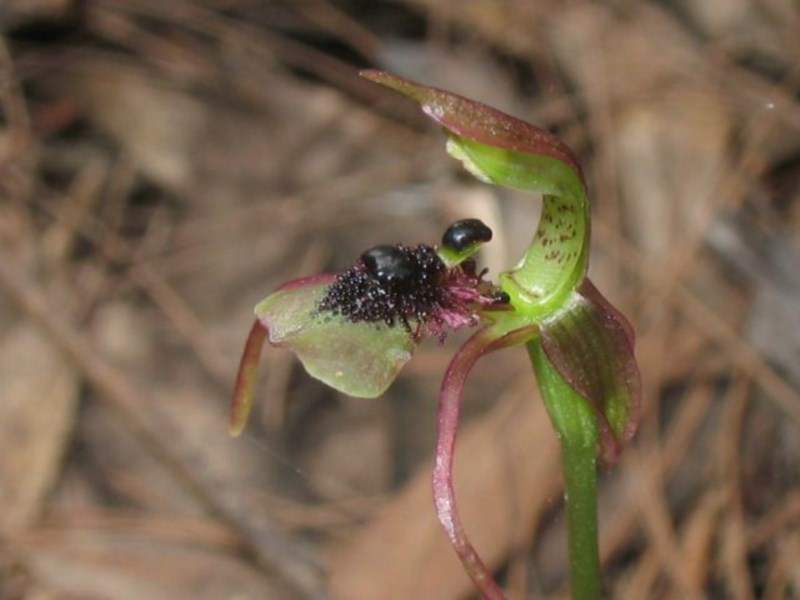

Scientific classification
- Kingdom: Plantae
- Clade: Tracheophytes
- Clade: Angiosperms
- Clade: Monocots
- Order: Asparagales
- Family: Orchidaceae
- Subfamily: Orchidoideae
- Tribe: Diurideae
- Genus: Chiloglottis
- Species: C. seminuda

Binomial name
- Chiloglottis seminuda D.L.Jones

= Chiloglottis seminuda =

Turtle orchid

Species of orchid

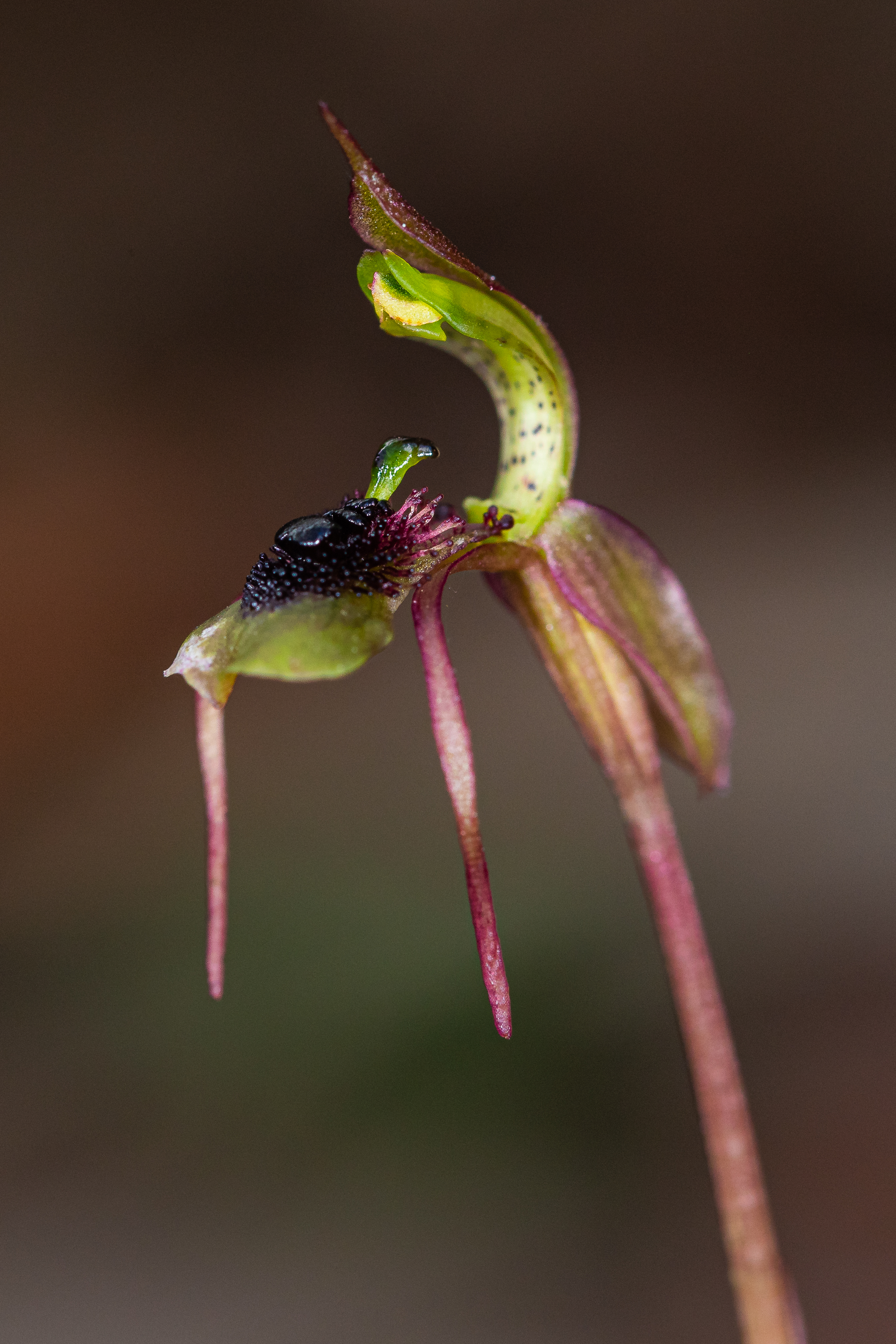
St Helens Park, NSW

Chiloglottis seminuda, commonly known as the turtle orchid, is a species of orchid endemic to south-eastern New South Wales. It has two broad leaves and a single green or reddish pink flower with a shiny black insect-like callus covering two-thirds of the base of the labellum but with the tip of the labellum free of callus.

== Description ==
Chiloglottis pluricallata is a terrestrial, perennial, deciduous, herb with two elliptic to oblong leaves 25–85 mm (1–3 in) long and 10–18 mm (0.4–0.7 in) wide on a petiole 5–20 mm (0.2–0.8 in) long. A single green to reddish pink flower 10–14 mm (0.4–0.6 in) long is borne on a flowering stem 100–150 mm (4–6 in) high. The dorsal sepal is erect, narrow spatula-shaped, 10–15 mm (0.4–0.6 in) long and 2.5–3 mm (0.098–0.12 in) wide. The lateral sepals are linear, 13–18 mm (0.5–0.7 in) long, about 1 mm (0.04 in) wide, turn downwards and away from each other. There is a glandular tip 2–2.5 mm (0.08–0.1 in) long on the end of the dorsal sepal and about 3–7 mm (0.1–0.3 in) long on the lateral sepals. The petals are narrow oblong, 8–11 mm (0.3–0.4 in) long, 2–3 mm (0.08–0.1 in) wide and turn downwards towards the ovary. The labellum is diamond-shaped, 8–10 mm (0.3–0.4 in) long and 5–6.5 mm (0.2–0.3 in) wide. There is a shiny black, insect-like callus 1.8 mm (0.07 in) long, occupying two-thirds of its base. The callus is surrounded by pinkish, club-shaped calli and by short black calli nearer the tip. The remaining one-third of the labellum is devoid of calli. The column is pale green with dark purple spots and flecks, 6.5–7.5 mm (0.26–0.30 in) long, about 2 mm (0.08 in) wide with narrow wings. Flowering occurs from January to April.

== Taxonomy and naming ==
Chiloglottis seminuda was first formally described in 1991 by David Jones from a specimen collected near Penrose and the description was published in Australian Orchid Research. The specific epithet (seminuda) is derived from the Latin prefix semi- meaning "a half" and nuda meaning "bare" or "naked", referring to the bare one-third of the tip of the labellum.

== Distribution and habitat ==
The turtle orchid grows in moist forest mainly between the Blue Mountains and Clyde Mountain but there are several isolated records from Victoria.
