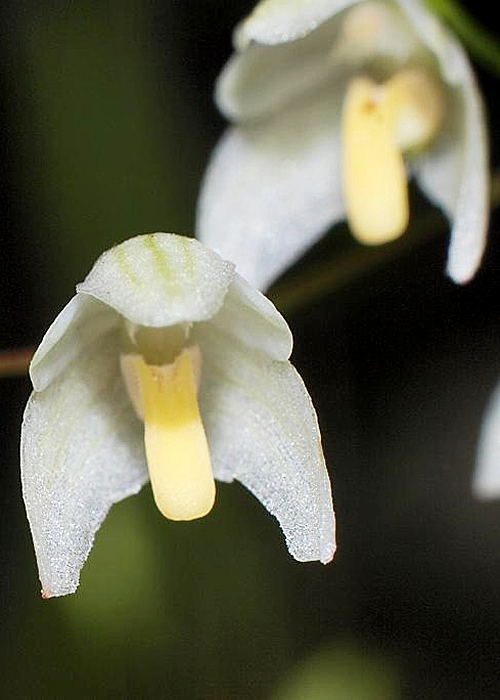
- Bulbophyllum newportii

Scientific classification
- Kingdom: Plantae
- Clade: Tracheophytes
- Clade: Angiosperms
- Clade: Monocots
- Order: Asparagales
- Family: Orchidaceae
- Subfamily: Epidendroideae
- Genus: Bulbophyllum
- Section: Bulbophyllum sect. Adelopetalum (Fitzg.) J.J. Verm. 1993

Type species
- Bulbophyllum bracteatum

Species
- See text

Synonyms
- Adelopetalum Fitzg. 1891

= Bulbophyllum sect. Adelopetalum =

Section of flowering plants

Bulbophyllum sect. Adelopetalum is a section of the genus Bulbophyllum.

== Description ==
Species in this section has creeping rhizome, an inflorescence with 2 or more flowers

== Distribution ==
Plants from this section are found in Australia, New Zealand and New Caledonia.

== Species ==
Bulbophyllum section Adelopetalum comprises the following species:

Image	Name	Distribution	Elevation (m)
	Bulbophyllum argyropus (Endl.) Rchb.f. 1876	Australia (Lord Howe and Norfolk Islands, Queensland and New South Wales) and New Zealand	600–1,000 metres (2,000–3,300 ft)
	Bulbophyllum boonjee B.Gray & D.L.Jones 1984	Australia (Queensland)	650–750 metres (2,130–2,460 ft)
	Bulbophyllum bracteatum F.M.Bailey 1891	Australia (Queensland and New South Wales)	400–1,000 metres (1,300–3,300 ft)
	Bulbophyllum corythium N.Hallé 1981	New Caledonia	900–950 metres (2,950–3,120 ft)
	Bulbophyllum elisae F. Mueller 1868	Australia (Queensland and New South Wales.)	600–1,300 metres (2,000–4,300 ft)
	Bulbophyllum lageniforme F.M.Bailey 1904	Australia (Queensland)	900–1,600 metres (3,000–5,200 ft)
	Bulbophyllum lilianae Rendle 1917	Australia (North Queensland.)	900 metres (3,000 ft)
	Bulbophyllum lingulatum Rendle 1921	New Caledonia	600–1,400 metres (2,000–4,600 ft)
	Bulbophyllum newportii Rolfe 1909	Australia (North Queensland.)	600–1,200 metres (2,000–3,900 ft)
	Bulbophyllum tuberculatum Colenso 1884	New Zealand	
	Bulbophyllum weinthalii Rogers 1933	Australia (Queensland to New South Wales. )	650–1,200 metres (2,130–3,940 ft)
	Bulbophyllum wilkianum T.E.Hunt 1947	Australia (Queensland)	
