= Mount Alexandra =

Mount Alexandra may refer to:

- Mount Alexandra (Canada), Canada
- Mount Alexandra (Antarctica)
- Mount Alexandra (Queensland), Australia
- Alexandra Peak, Vancouver Island, British Columbia, Canada
