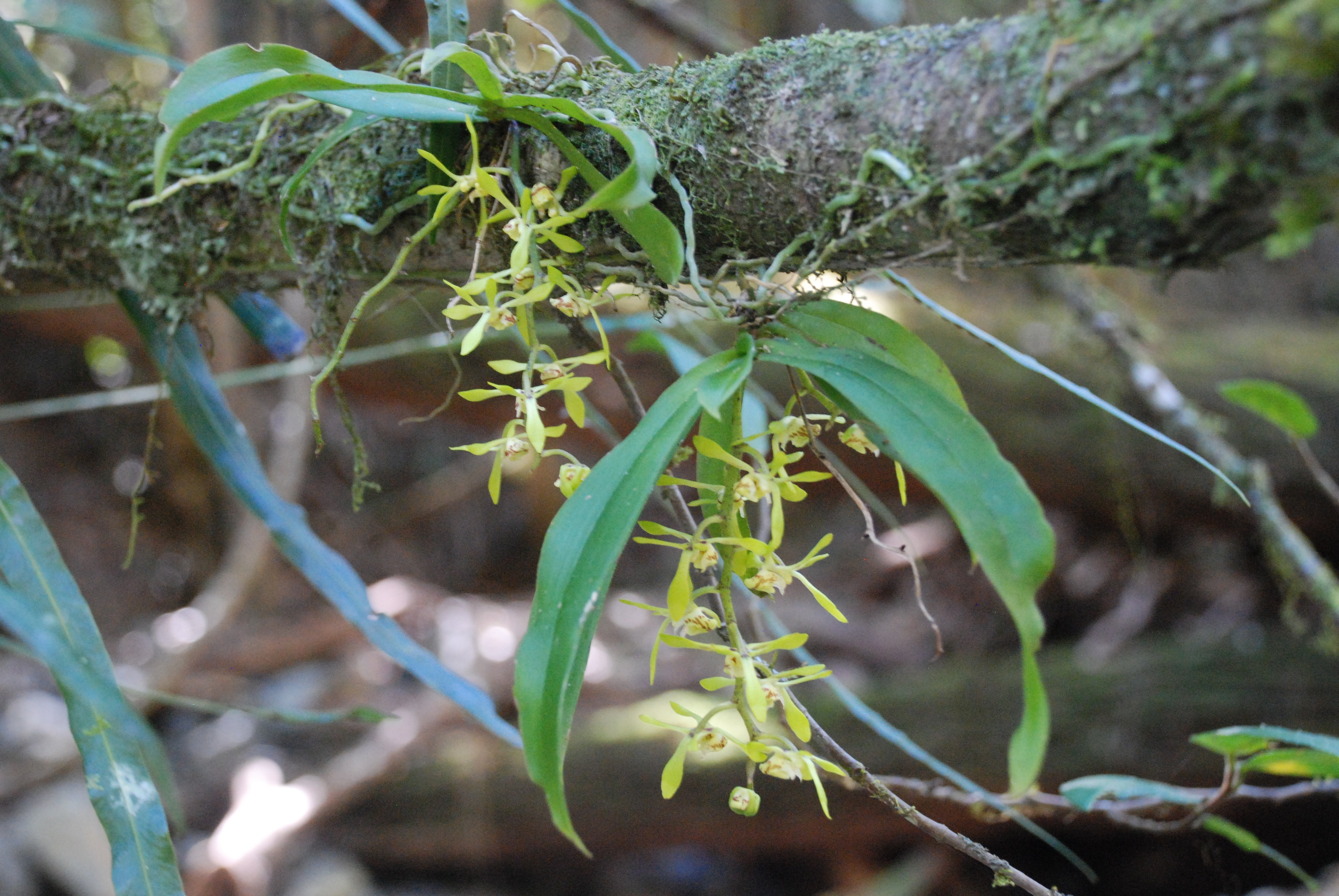
- Flowering at Mt. Boss State Forest

Scientific classification
- Kingdom: Plantae
- Clade: Tracheophytes
- Clade: Angiosperms
- Clade: Monocots
- Order: Asparagales
- Family: Orchidaceae
- Subfamily: Epidendroideae
- Genus: Sarcochilus
- Species: S. parviflorus

Binomial name
- Sarcochilus parviflorus Lindl.

Synonyms
- Thrixspermum parviflorum (Lindl.) Rchb.f.; Sarcochilus olivaceus Lindl.; Thrixspermum olivaceum (Lindl.) Rchb.f.

= Sarcochilus parviflorus =

Southern lawyer orchid

Species of orchid

Sarcochilus parviflorus, commonly known as the southern lawyer orchid or green tree orchid, is an epiphytic orchid endemic to eastern Australia. It has up to eight rigid leaves and up to twelve small bright green to yellowish green flowers with reddish markings on the labellum.

== Description ==
Sarcochilus parviflorus is an epiphytic, rarely lithophytic orchid with sparsely branched stems 30–80 mm (1–3 in) long with between two and eight leaves. The leaves are dark green, rigid, egg-shaped to narrow oblong, 80–150 mm (3–6 in) long and 30–40 mm (1–2 in) long wide. The flowering stems are 90–140 mm (4–6 in) long and bear between two and twelve bright green to yellowish green flowers 18–22 mm (0.7–0.9 in) long and 20–25 mm (0.8–1 in) wide. The sepal are 10–15 mm (0.4–0.6 in) long and 3–4 mm (0.1–0.2 in) wide whilst the petals are narrower. The labellum is 6–8 mm (0.2–0.3 in) long, 4–5 mm (0.16–0.20 in) wide and greenish cream with reddish markings. The labellum has three lobes, the side lobes curving upwards near their tips and the middle lobe with a short tooth on its midline. Flowering occurs between June and January.

== Taxonomy and naming ==
Sarcochilus parviflorus was first formally described in 1838 by John Lindley and the description was published in Edwards's Botanical Register. The specific epithet (parviflorus) is derived from the Latin words parvus meaning "little" and flos meaning "flower".

== Distribution and habitat ==
The southern lawyer orchid grows on trees, rarely on rocks, in rainforest in coastal areas and nearby tablelands between Brisbane and Tathra.
