= Sarcochilus dilatatus =

Brown butterfly orchid

Scientific classification
- Kingdom: Plantae
- Clade: Tracheophytes
- Clade: Angiosperms
- Clade: Monocots
- Order: Asparagales
- Family: Orchidaceae
- Subfamily: Epidendroideae
- Genus: Sarcochilus
- Species: S. dilatatus

Binomial name
- Sarcochilus dilatatus F.Muell.

Synonyms
- Sarcochilus bancroftii F.M.Bailey; Thrixspermum dilatatum (F.Muell.) Rchb.f.

Species of orchid

Sarcochilus dilatatus, commonly known as the brown butterfly orchid, is a small epiphytic orchid endemic to eastern Australia. It has up to twelve, thin, leathery, dark green leaves and up to twelve brown or reddish brown flowers with a mostly white and yellow labellum.

== Description ==
Sarcochilus dilatatus is a small epiphytic herb with a stem 10–30 mm (0.4–1 in) long with between four and twelve thin, leathery, dark green leaves 30–60 mm (1–2 in) long and about 10 mm (0.4 in) wide. Between two and twelve brown or dark reddish brown flowers 18–22 mm (0.7–0.9 in) long and 15–20 mm (0.6–0.8 in) wide are arranged on a flowering stem 30–70 mm (1–3 in) long. The tips of the sepals and petals are often dilated. The dorsal sepal is 5–9 mm (0.2–0.4 in) long and 2–3 mm (0.08–0.1 in) wide whilst the lateral sepals are slightly longer. The petals are a similar size to the dorsal sepal. The labellum is white with yellow and reddish brown markings, about 2 mm (0.08 in) long and 4 mm (0.16 in) wide and has three lobes. The side lobes are erect with reddish brown lines and the middle lobe short and fleshy with a yellow tip. Flowering occurs between September and October.

== Taxonomy and naming ==
Sarcochilus dilatatus was first formally described in 1859 by Ferdinand von Mueller who published the description in Fragmenta phytographiae Australiae from a specimen collected near Moreton Bay by Walter Hill.

== Distribution and habitat ==
The brown butterfly orchid usually grows on trees, often hoop pine (Araucaria cunninghamii), in drier rainforest. It is found from Carnarvon Gorge and Gladstone in Queensland south to the Richmond River in New South Wales.

== Conservation ==
Sarcochilus dilatatus is very rare in New South Wales with only a single recent record from that state and it is classed as "endangered" there. The main threats to the species are weed invasion and illegal collecting.
