= Ferdinand August Weinthal =

Australian botanist and orchid grower

Ferdinand August Weinthal (born 2 January 1881) was an Australian botanist and orchid grower who, in the early 20th century, was responsible for the collection of multiple eastern Australian orchids which were previously unknown to western science.

== Early life ==
F.A. Weinthal was born in Brisbane and spent his younger and early adult years in and around South Eastern Queensland where was to develop his initial interest in botany and native plant cultivation. He sat for his Public Service examination in January 1899 and became a successful candidate for the Public Service in February the same year working initially as a conveyancing clerk in the Brisbane Stamp Office. Weinthal was to later relocate to Roseville in Sydney where he was to raise a family with his wife Florence. Weinthal worked as a conveyancer with the New South Wales Government Savings Bank whilst actively maintaining his botanical collection work, submitting specimen collections to herbariums throughout Australia and abroad over a number of decades.

== Collection work ==
Weinthal was a prolific botanical collector and the species Bulbophyllum weinthalii and Sarcochilus weinthalii are both named in his honour.

Bulbophyllum weinthalii was first formally described in 1933 by Richard Sanders Rogers and the description was published in Transactions and Proceedings of the Royal Society of South Australia from a specimen collected by Weinthal with the specific epithet (weinthalii) honouring his role as collector of the type specimen.

There are two subspecies:

- Bulbophyllum weinthalii subsp. weinthalii, commonly known as the blotched wax orchid which has coloured spots and blotches on the flowers and has a more southerly distribution.
- Bulbophyllum weinthalii subsp. striatum, the streaked wax orchid which has coloured striations on the flowers, a more northerly distribution and grows at lower altitudes than the autonym.

Sarcochilus weinthalii was first formally described in 1904 by Frederick Manson Bailey and the description was published in the Queensland Agricultural Journal from a specimen collected near Toowoomba by Weinthal. The specific epithet (weinthalii) honours his initial collection of the type specimen at Main Range Toowoomba Queensland in 1903.

Listed specimen collections lodged by F.A. Weinthal with the Royal Royal Botanic Gardens, Kew:

1927

Mr. F. A. Weinthal, Sydney, N.S.W.- A collection of terrestrial orchids.

1930

Mr. F. A. Weinthal, Roseville, New South Wales - A collection of Australian orchids.

1932

Mr. F. A. Weinthal, Roseville, N.S.W. - A collection of orchids.

1933

Mr. F. A. Weinthal, New South Wales - A collection of orchids and 4 packets of miscellaneous seeds.

Mr. F. A. Weinthal, New South Wales - A collection of orchids.

1934

Mr. F. A. Weinthall, Roseville, New South Wales. - A collection of orchids.

Mr. F. A. Weinthal, Roseville, New South Wales - Orchids.

A collection of New South Wales orchids was presented by Mr. F. A. Weinthal.

1935

Mr. F. A. Weinthal, Roseville, N.S.W. - Orchids.

1936

Mr. F. A. Weinthal, Roseville, N.S.W. - Plants, including Den-drobium, Cymbidium and Sarcochilus spp.; seeds of Drosera and Stylidium spp.

1937

Mr. F. A. Weinthal, Roseville, New South Wales. - A collection of orchids; seeds of Drosera peltata.

Mr. F. A. Weinthal, Roseville, N.S.W. - Plants of Cattleya and Cymbidium hybrids.

1940

Dendrobium Kingianum, D. Fairfaxii, D. delicatum, D. aemulum, and D. gracilicaule, all charming species of orchids collected by Mr. F. A. Weinthal in Australia.
