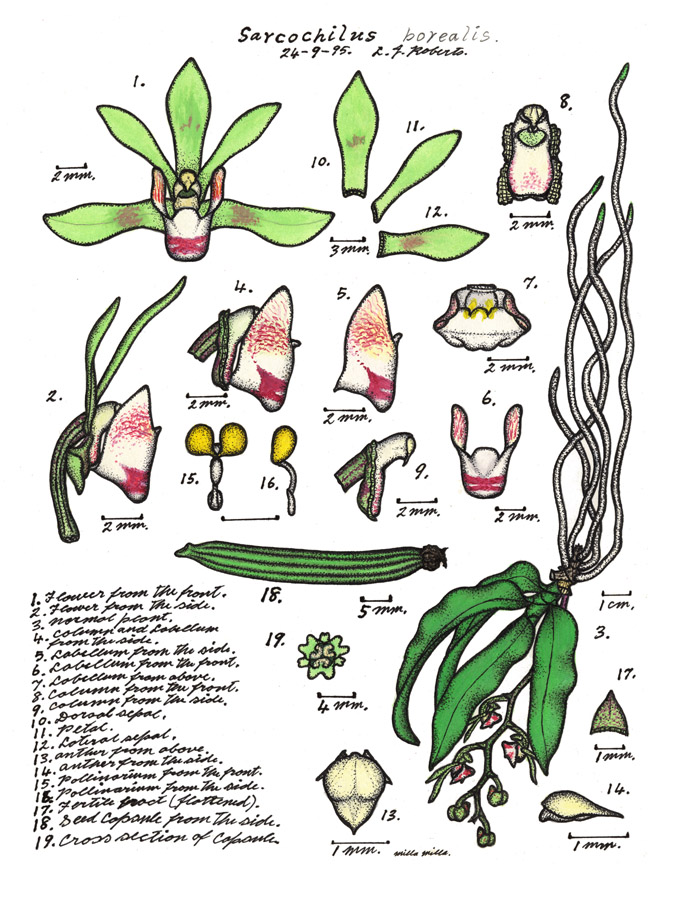
- Illustration by Lewis Roberts

Scientific classification
- Kingdom: Plantae
- Clade: Tracheophytes
- Clade: Angiosperms
- Clade: Monocots
- Order: Asparagales
- Family: Orchidaceae
- Subfamily: Epidendroideae
- Genus: Sarcochilus
- Species: S. borealis

Binomial name
- Sarcochilus borealis (Nicholls) D.L.Jones & M.A.Clem.

Synonyms
- Sarcochilus olivaceus var. borealis Nicholls

= Sarcochilus borealis =

Small lawyer orchid

Species of orchid

Sarcochilus borealis, commonly known as small lawyer orchid, is a small epiphytic orchid endemic to Queensland. It has up to six thin but stiff, dark green leaves and up to ten green flowers with a white labellum that has reddish brown markings.

== Description ==
Sarcochilus borealis is a small epiphytic herb with a stem 10–30 mm (0.4–1 in) long with between two and six thin but stiff dark green leaves 40–80 mm (2–3 in) long and 15–20 mm (0.6–0.8 in) wide. Between two and ten pale green to dark green flowers 16–18 mm (0.6–0.7 in) long and 18–20 mm (0.7–0.8 in) wide are arranged on a flowering stem 60–100 mm (2–4 in) long. The sepal are 8–11 mm (0.3–0.4 in) long and 3–5 mm (0.1–0.2 in) wide whilst the petals are slightly shorter and narrower. The labellum is white with reddish brown markings, 5–7 mm (0.2–0.3 in) long and 3–4 mm (0.12–0.16 in) wide and has three lobes. The side lobes are erect and the middle lobe is smaller with a prominent tooth. Flowering occurs between June and December.

== Taxonomy and naming ==
Small lawyer orchid was first formally described in 1939 by William Henry Nicholls who gave it the name Sarcochilus olivaceus var. borealis and published the description in The North Queensland Naturalist. In 1989 David Jones and Mark Clements raised the variety to species status. The specific epithet (borealis) is a Latin word meaning "northern".

== Distribution and habitat ==
Small lawyer orchid grows on trees and vines in rainforest at altitudes of 800–1,000 m (3,000–3,000 ft) in the Mount Lewis National Park and on the Atherton Tableland.
