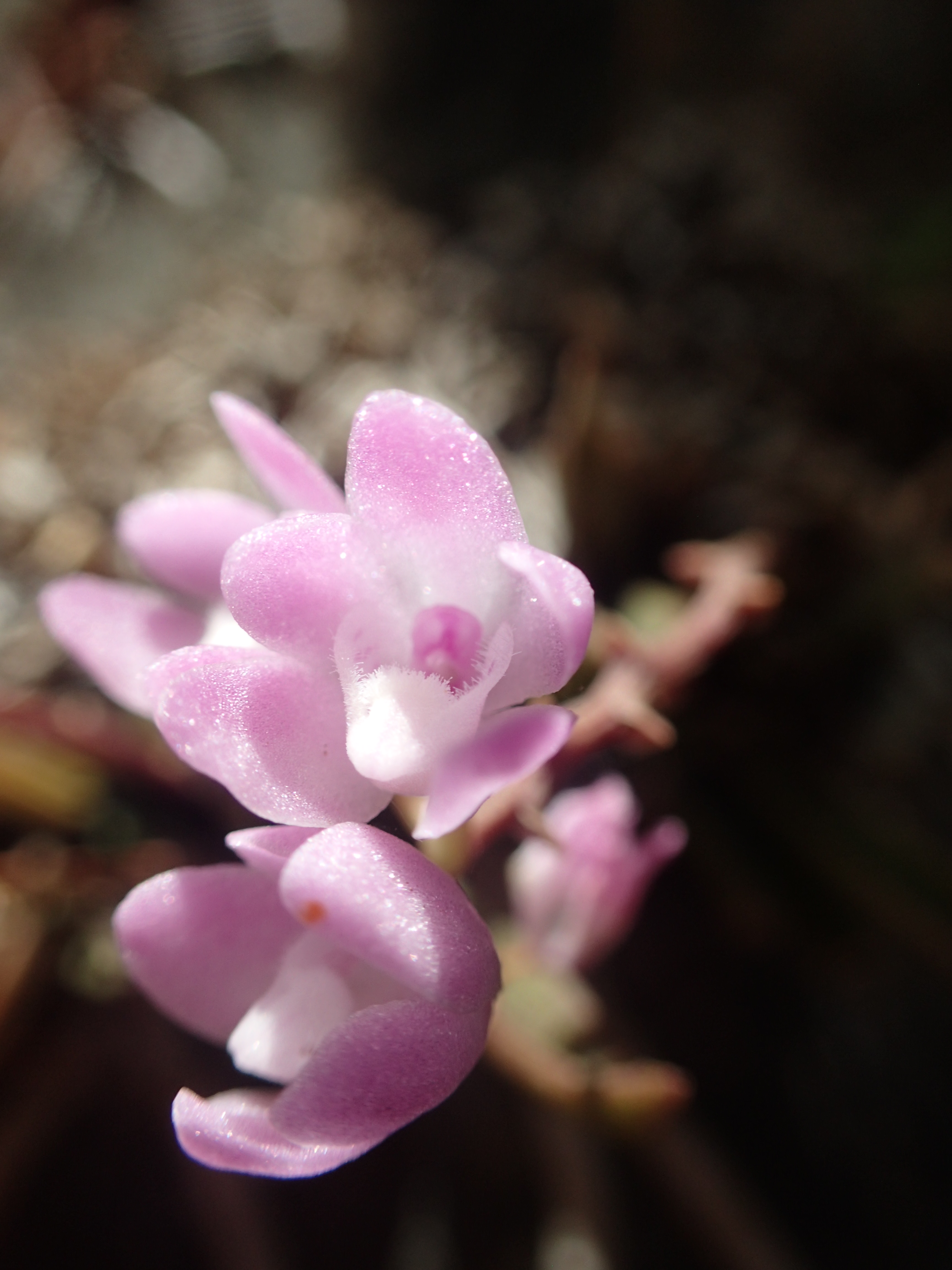
- In the Oxley Wild Rivers National Park

Scientific classification
- Kingdom: Plantae
- Clade: Tracheophytes
- Clade: Angiosperms
- Clade: Monocots
- Order: Asparagales
- Family: Orchidaceae
- Subfamily: Epidendroideae
- Genus: Sarcochilus
- Species: S. ceciliae

Binomial name
- Sarcochilus ceciliae F.Muell.

Synonyms
- Sarcochilus ceciliae F.Muell. subsp. ceciliae; Sarcochilus ceciliae subsp. roseus Clemesha; Sarcochilus ceciliae var. albus T.E.Hunt; Sarcochilus ceciliae F.Muell. var. ceciliae; Sarcochilus ceciliae var. roseus (Clemesha) Dockrill; Sarcochilus roseus (Clemesha) Clemesha; Sarcochilus setosus D.L.Jones, M.A.Clem. & D.P.Banks; Thrixspermum ceciliae (F.Muell.) Rchb.f.

= Sarcochilus ceciliae =

Fairy bells

Species of orchid

Sarcochilus ceciliae, commonly known as fairy bells, is a lithophytic orchid endemic to eastern Australia. It has up to ten channelled, spotted linear leaves and up to twenty pink flowers with a hairy labellum.

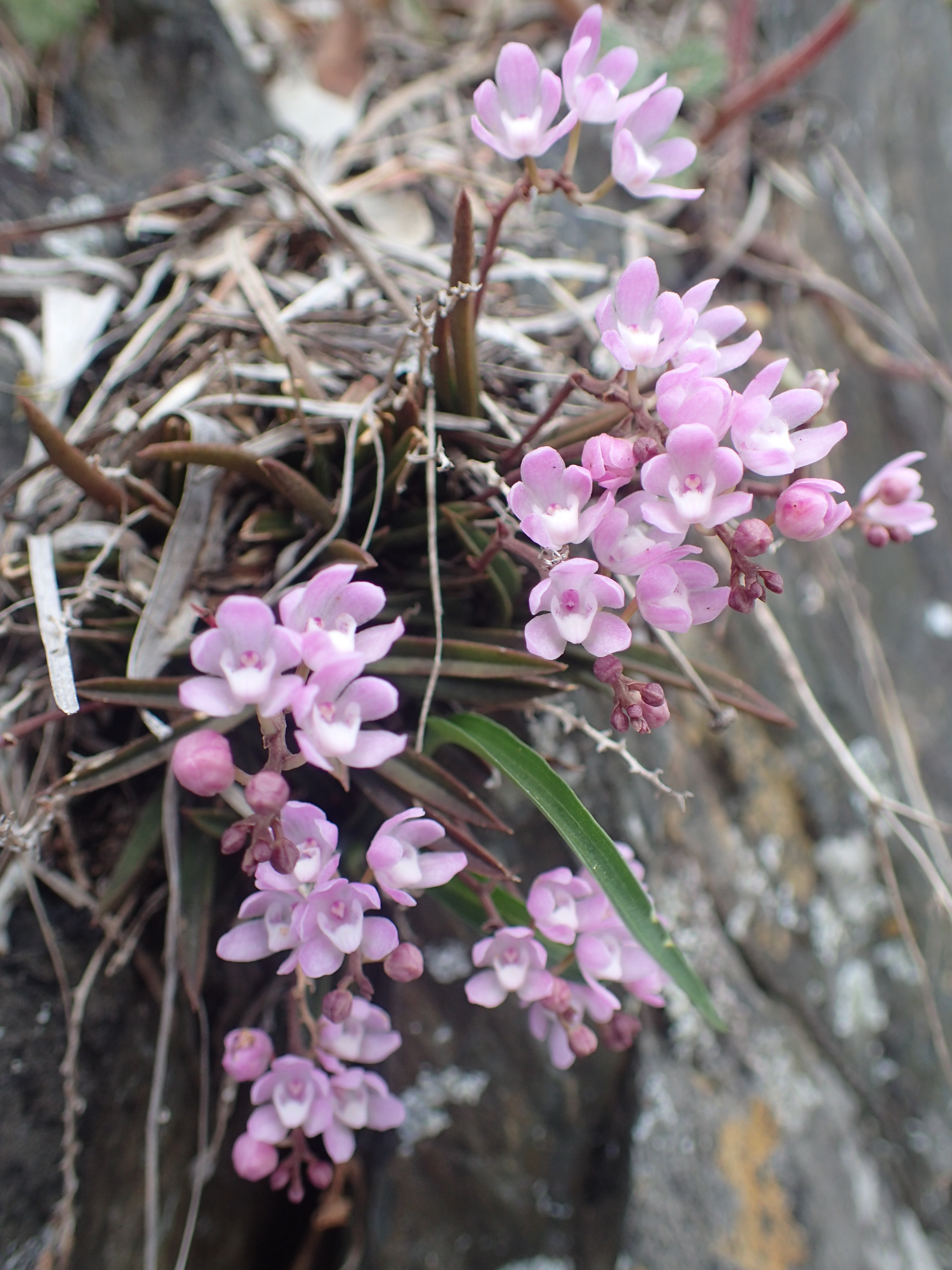
Sarcochilus ceciliae habit

== Description ==
Sarcochilus ceciliae is a lithophytic herb that forms small clumps on rocks. It has an erect, branching stem 30–120 mm (1–5 in) long with between four and ten channelled, spotted linear leaves 40–120 mm (2–5 in) long and 3–8 mm (0.12–0.31 in) wide. Between three and twenty pale to bright pink, cup-shaped flowers 4–8 mm (0.2–0.3 in) long and wide are arranged on a flowering stem 70–200 mm (3–8 in) long. The dorsal sepal is 4–6 mm (0.16–0.24 in) long, about 3 mm (0.12 in) wide and the lateral sepals are a similar length or slightly longer. The petals are 4–5 mm (0.16–0.20 in) long and about 2 mm (0.079 in) wide. The labellum is fleshy and about 3 mm (0.12 in) long and has three lobes. The side lobes are erect and hairy and the middle lobe is short, thick and densely hairy. Flowering occurs between October and March.

== Taxonomy and naming ==
Sarcochilus ceciliae was first formally described in 1865 by Ferdinand von Mueller and the description was published in Fragmenta phytographiae Australiae from a specimen collected near Cleveland Bay by Edward Bowman. The specific epithet (ceciliae) honours Cecilia Viennot van Maseyk.

== Distribution and habitat ==
Fairy bells mainly grows on rocks and cliff faces in humid places. It occurs between the Atherton Tableland in Queensland and the Hastings River catchment in New South Wales.
