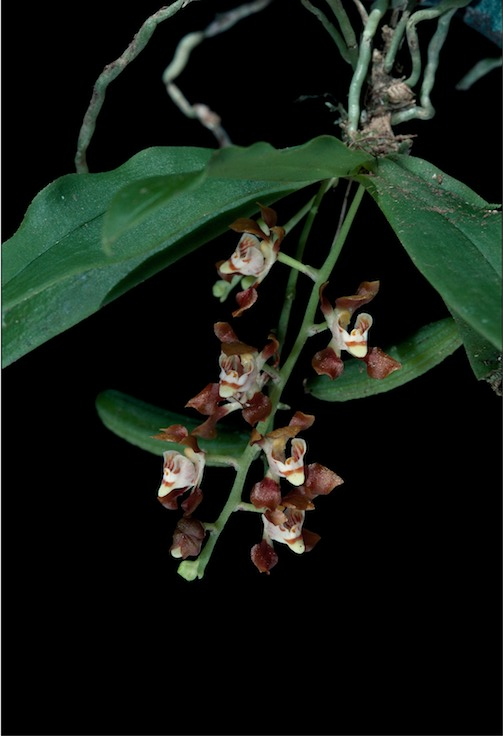
- Sarcochilus serrulatus in Cedar Bay National Park

Scientific classification
- Kingdom: Plantae
- Clade: Tracheophytes
- Clade: Angiosperms
- Clade: Monocots
- Order: Asparagales
- Family: Orchidaceae
- Subfamily: Epidendroideae
- Genus: Sarcochilus
- Species: S. serrulatus

Binomial name
- Sarcochilus serrulatus D.L.Jones

Synonyms
- Sarcochilus serrulatis Dockrill orth. var.; Sarcochilus olivaceus var. borealis auct. non Nicholls: Dockrill, A.W. (1969)

= Sarcochilus serrulatus =

Banded butterfly orchid

Species of orchid

Sarcochilus serrulatus, commonly known as the banded butterfly orchid, is an epiphytic orchid endemic to tropical North Queensland. It has up to six crowded leaves with finely toothed and wavy edges and up to ten reddish brown flowers with a white, yellow-banded labellum.

== Description ==
Sarcochilus serrulatus is an epiphytic herb with a stem 10–20 mm (0.4–0.8 in) long with between three and six curved leaves 50–100 mm (2.0–3.9 in) long and about 20 mm (0.8 in) wide. The leaves are oblong to egg-shaped with wavy edges that have fine teeth. Between two and ten reddish brown flowers 14–18 mm (0.55–0.71 in) long and 12–15 mm (0.47–0.59 in) wide are arranged on a fleshy, club-shaped flowering stem 20–40 mm (0.8–2 in) long. The dorsal sepal is 5–6 mm (0.20–0.24 in) long and wide whilst the lateral sepals are 5–7 mm (0.20–0.28 in) long and 3–4 mm (0.12–0.16 in) wide. The petals are shorter and narrower than the lateral sepals. The labellum is white with reddish and yellowish markings, about 4 mm (0.2 in) long and wide with three lobes. The side lobes are erect and curve inwards and the middle lobe is fleshy with a spur about 3 mm (0.1 in) long. Flowering occurs between August and January.

== Taxonomy and naming ==
Sarcochilus serrulatus was first formally described in 1972 by David Jones and the description was published in The Victorian Naturalist. The specific epithet (serrulatus) is derived from the Latin word serra meaning "toothed like a saw".

== Distribution and habitat ==
The banded butterfly orchid grows on trees in dense rainforest, usually near streams. It is only known from the Tablelands Region of north Queensland.
