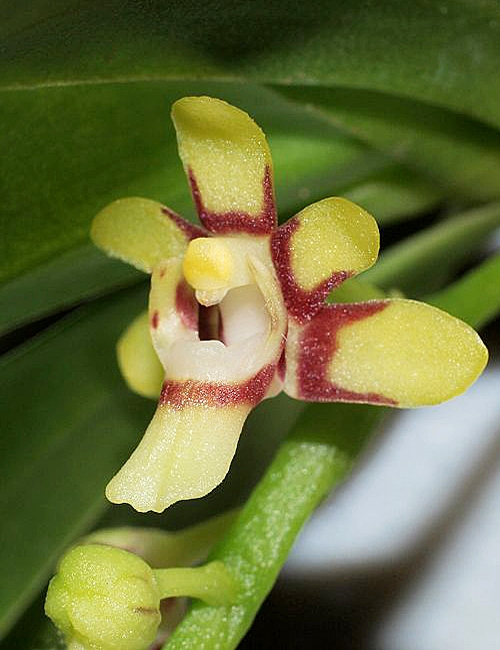

Scientific classification
- Kingdom: Plantae
- Clade: Embryophytes
- Clade: Tracheophytes
- Clade: Angiosperms
- Clade: Monocots
- Order: Asparagales
- Family: Orchidaceae
- Subfamily: Epidendroideae
- Genus: Sarcochilus
- Species: S. hirticalcar

Binomial name
- Sarcochilus hirticalcar (Dockrill) M.A.Clem. & B.J.Wallace

Synonyms
- Parasarcochilus hirticalcar Dockrill; Pteroceras hirticalcar (Dockrill) Garay

= Sarcochilus hirticalcar =

Harlequin orchid

Species of orchid

Sarcochilus hirticalcar, commonly known as the harlequin orchid, is a small epiphytic orchid endemic to Queensland. It has up to eight bright green leaves and up to twelve cream-coloured to bright yellow flowers with purplish to reddish brown bands.

== Description ==
Sarcochilus hirticalcar is a small epiphytic herb with stems 20–40 mm (0.8–2 in) long with between two and ten leathery, linear or curved bright green leaves 50–120 mm (2.0–4.7 in) long and 10–15 mm (0.39–0.59 in) wide. Between two and twelve cream-coloured to bright yellow flowers with purplish to reddish bands, 7–8 mm (0.28–0.31 in) long and 10–12 mm (0.39–0.47 in) wide are arranged on a flowering stem 50–120 mm (2.0–4.7 in) long. The dorsal sepal is 4–6 mm (0.16–0.24 in) long and 3–4 mm (0.12–0.16 in) wide and the lateral sepals are slightly longer. The petals are 4–5 mm (0.16–0.20 in) long and about 2.5 mm (0.098 in) wide. The labellum is 3–4 mm (0.12–0.16 in) long and 4–5 mm (0.16–0.20 in) wide and has three lobes. The side lobes are erect with purple stripes on the inside and the middle lobe is densely covered with white hairs. Flowering occurs between October and December but only up to three flowers are open at once.

== Taxonomy and naming ==
The harlequin orchid was first formally described in 1967 by Alick Dockrill who gave it the name Parasarcochilus hirticalcar and published the description in Australasian Sarcanthinae. In 1998 Mark Clements and Benjamin John Wallace changed the name to Sarcochilus hirticalcar. The specific epithet (hirticalcar) is derived from the Latin words hirtus meaning "hairy", "rough" or "shaggy" and calcar meaning "a spur".

== Distribution and habitat ==
Sarcochilus hirticalcar grows on trees in rainforest and along rivers, often growing on Dillenia alata. It is only known from the McIlwraith Range where it grows at altitudes of between 300 and 600 m (1,000 and 2,000 ft).
