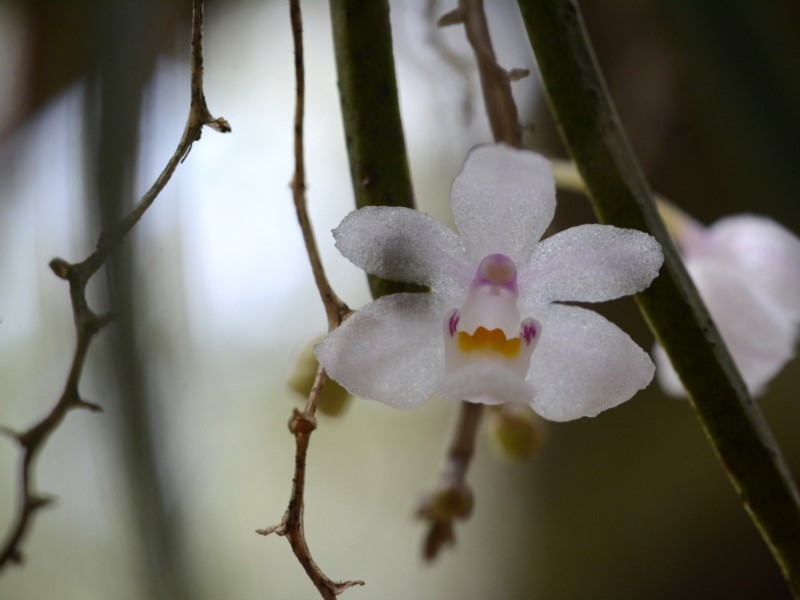
- Sarcochilus hillii in Bugong National Park

Scientific classification
- Kingdom: Plantae
- Clade: Tracheophytes
- Clade: Angiosperms
- Clade: Monocots
- Order: Asparagales
- Family: Orchidaceae
- Subfamily: Epidendroideae
- Genus: Sarcochilus
- Species: S. hillii

Binomial name
- Sarcochilus hillii (F.Muell.) F.Muell.

Synonyms
- Dendrobium hillii F.Muell.; Thrixspermum hillii (F.Muell.) Rchb.f.; Sarcochilus loganii D.L.Jones & M.A.Clem.; Sarcochilus minutiflos F.M.Bailey

= Sarcochilus hillii =

Myrtle bells

Species of orchid

Sarcochilus hillii, commonly known as myrtle bells, is a small epiphytic orchid native to eastern Australia and New Caledonia. It has up to ten drooping, quill-shaped leaves and up to ten frosty white or pink flowers that have a hairy labellum with purple stripes.

== Description ==
Sarcochilus hillii is a drooping, epiphytic herb with stems 20–50 mm (0.79–2.0 in) long. It has between two and ten linear or quill-shaped leaves 60–100 mm (2.4–3.9 in) long and about 3 mm (0.1 in) wide. Between two and ten frosty white or pink flowers, 8–10 mm (0.31–0.39 in) long and wide are arranged on a flowering stem 50–120 mm (2.0–4.7 in) long. The dorsal sepal is 4–6 mm (0.16–0.24 in) long and 3–4 mm (0.12–0.16 in) wide, the lateral sepals slightly longer. The petals are 4–5 mm (0.16–0.20 in) long and about 2.5 mm (0.098 in) wide. The labellum is hairy, about 3–4 mm (0.1–0.2 in) long, 4–5 mm (0.16–0.20 in) wide and has three lobes. The side lobes are erect with purple stripes on the inside surface the middle lobe is densely hairy. Flowering occurs between October and December but only a few flowers are open at once.

== Taxonomy and naming ==
Myrtle bells was first formally described in 1859 by Ferdinand von Mueller who gave it the name Dendrobium hillii and published the description in Fragmenta phytographiae Australiae from a specimen collected near Moreton Bay by Walter Hill (garden curator). In 1860, Mueller changed the name to Sarcochilus hillii. The specific epithet (hillii) honours the collector of the type specimen.

In 2019, a variety, S. hillii var. thycola was raised to species rank as Sarcochilus thycola in the Australian Orchid Review.

== Distribution and habitat ==
Sarcochilus hillii usually grows on trees in rainforest, often on Backhousia myrtifolia and occasionally on rocks. It is found between Rockhampton in Queensland and Bega in New South Wales and it also occurs in New Caledonia.
