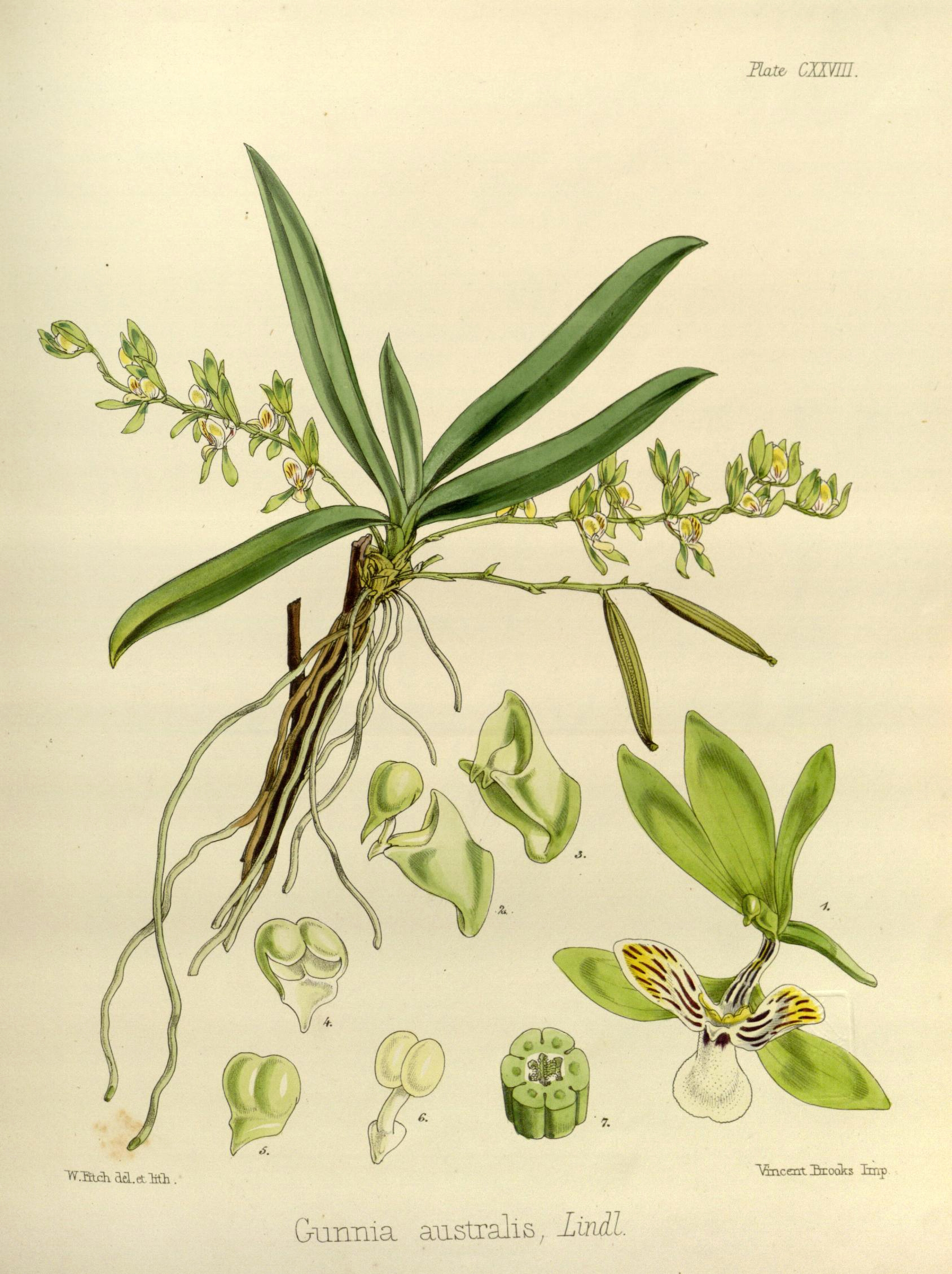
- Illustration from Hooker's Flora Antarctica

Scientific classification
- Kingdom: Plantae
- Clade: Tracheophytes
- Clade: Angiosperms
- Clade: Monocots
- Order: Asparagales
- Family: Orchidaceae
- Subfamily: Epidendroideae
- Genus: Sarcochilus
- Species: S. australis

Binomial name
- Sarcochilus australis (Lindl.) Rchb.f.

Synonyms
- Gunnia australis Lindl.; Gunnia picta Lindl.; Sarcochilus barklyanus F.Muell.; Sarcochilus gunnii F.Muell. nom. illeg., nom. superfl.; Sarcochilus pictus (Lindl.) Rchb.f.; Thrixspermum australe (Lindl.) Rchb.f.; Thrixspermum australis Ross orth. var.; Thrixspermum pictum (Lindl.) Rchb.f.; Thrixspermum pictus M.A.Clem. orth. var.

= Sarcochilus australis =

Butterfly orchid

Species of orchid

Sarcochilus australis, commonly known as butterfly orchid or Gunn's tree orchid, is a small epiphytic orchid endemic to eastern Australia. It has up to ten oblong, dark green leaves and up to fourteen small green to yellowish or brownish flowers with a mostly white labellum.

== Description ==
Sarcochilus australis is a small epiphytic herb with a stem 20–50 mm (0.8–2 in) long with between three and ten dark green leaves 40–80 mm (2–3 in) long and 10–14 mm (0.4–0.6 in) wide. Between two and fourteen green to yellowish or brownish flowers 16–18 mm (0.6–0.7 in) long and 12–15 mm (0.5–0.6 in) wide are arranged on a pendulous flowering stem 70–160 mm (3–6 in) long. The sepals are 7–12 mm (0.3–0.5 in) long and 3–4.5 mm (0.1–0.2 in) wide whilst the petals are shorter and narrower. The labellum is white with purple and yellow markings, about 3 mm (0.1 in) long and 5 mm (0.20 in) wide and has three lobes. The side lobes are erect, usually with purple markings and the middle lobe erect with a thin, solid spur. Flowering occurs between October and January.

== Taxonomy and naming ==
Butterfly orchid was first formally described in 1834 by John Lindley who gave it the name Gunnia australis and published the description in Edwards's Botanical Register. In 1863, Heinrich Gustav Reichenbach changed the name to Sarcochilus australis. The specific epithet (australis) is a Latin word meaning "southern".

== Distribution and habitat ==
Sarcochilus australis grows on trees in rainforest and other humid places, sometimes close to the ground. It is found between the Hunter River in New South Wales through south-eastern Victoria to northern Tasmania.
