= Sarcochilus argochilus =

Northern lawyer orchid

Scientific classification
- Kingdom: Plantae
- Clade: Tracheophytes
- Clade: Angiosperms
- Clade: Monocots
- Order: Asparagales
- Family: Orchidaceae
- Subfamily: Epidendroideae
- Genus: Sarcochilus
- Species: S. argochilus

Binomial name
- Sarcochilus argochilus D.L.Jones & M.A.Clem.

Species of orchid

Sarcochilus argochilus, commonly known as the northern lawyer orchid, is a small epiphytic orchid endemic to Queensland. It has up to eight thin leaves and up to twelve small bright green to yellowish green flowers with a white labellum.

== Description ==
Sarcochilus argochilus is a small epiphytic herb with sparsely branched stems 30–80 mm (1–3 in) long with between two and eight leaves. The leaves are dark green, thin but rigid, oblong, 80–150 mm (3–6 in) long and 30–40 mm (1–2 in) wide. Between two and twelve bright green to yellowish green flowers 18–22 mm (0.7–0.9 in) long and 20–25 mm (0.8–1 in) wide are arranged on a flowering stem 90–140 mm (4–6 in) long. The sepal are 10–15 mm (0.4–0.6 in) long and 3–4 mm (0.1–0.2 in) wide whilst the petals are shorter and narrower. The labellum is white, 6–8 mm (0.2–0.3 in) long and 4–5 mm (0.16–0.20 in) wide with a few reddish brown markings. The labellum has three lobes, the side lobes erect and the middle lobe with a short tooth. Flowering occurs between June and December.

== Taxonomy and naming ==
Sarcochilus argochilus was first formally described in 2006 by David Jones and Mark Clements and the description was published in Australian Orchid Review from a specimen collected in the Eungella National Park.

== Distribution and habitat ==
The northern lawyer orchid grows on trees and vines in rainforest and other humid places. It is found in Queensland between the Mount Lewis National Park and Toowoomba.
