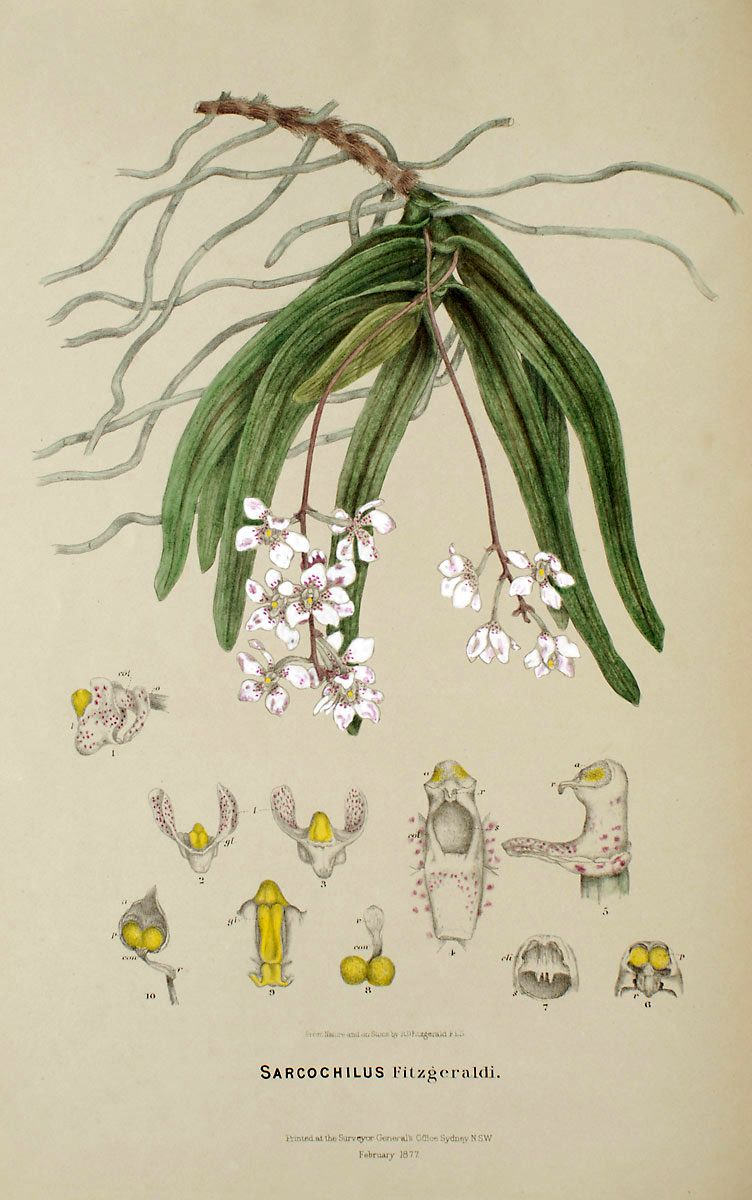
- Illustration of Sarcochilus fitzgeraldii from Fitzgerald's Australian Orchids

Scientific classification
- Kingdom: Plantae
- Clade: Tracheophytes
- Clade: Angiosperms
- Clade: Monocots
- Order: Asparagales
- Family: Orchidaceae
- Subfamily: Epidendroideae
- Tribe: Vandeae
- Subtribe: Aeridinae
- Genus: Sarcochilus; R.Br.

Type species
- Sarcochilus falcatus R.Br.

Synonyms
- Gunnia Lindl.; Monanthochilus (Schltr.) R.Rice; Parasarcochilus Dockrill

= Sarcochilus =

Genus of orchids

Sarcochilus, commonly known as butterfly orchids or fairy bells is a genus of about twenty species of flowering plants in the orchid family, Orchidaceae. Plants in this genus are epiphytes or lithophytes and usually have short stems, leaves arranged in two rows, and flowers arranged along unbranched flowering stems. Most species are endemic to Australia but some are found in New Guinea and New Caledonia.

== Description ==
Orchids in the genus Sarcochilus are epiphytic or lithophytic monopodial herbs with fibrous stems and long, relatively broad leaves folded lengthwise and arranged in two ranks. The flowers are scented, resupinate and arranged on an unbranched flowering stem, each flower on a short thin stalk. The sepals and petals are free from and similar to each other except that the petals are usually smaller than the sepals. The labellum is hinged to the column and has three lobes. The sides lobes are relatively large and upright, sometimes curving inwards. The structure of the middle lobe varies between species.

== Taxonomy and naming ==
The genus Sarcochilus was first formally described in 1810 by Robert Brown and the description was published in Prodromus Florae Novae Hollandiae et Insulae Van Diemen. The name Sarcochilus is derived from the Ancient Greek words sarx meaning "flesh" and cheilos meaning "lip", referring to the fleshy labellum of these orchids.

The genus Sarcochilus has been shown to be non-monophyletic.

== Species ==
The following is a list of Sarcochilus species recognised by Plants of the World Online as of March 2023. The common names in the list below are those used by David Jones.

Image	Name	Common name	Distribution	Elevation (m)
	Sarcochilus argochilus D.L.Jones & M.A.Clem., 2006	northern lawyer orchid	Queensland	400–1,000 metres (1,300–3,300 ft)
	Sarcochilus australis (Lindl.) Rchb.f. in Walp., 1863	butterfly orchid, Gunn's tree orchid	New South Wales through south-eastern Victoria to northern Tasmania.	0–1,000 metres (0–3,281 ft)
	Sarcochilus borealis (Nicholls) D.L.Jones & M.A.Clem., 1989	small lawyer orchid	New South Wales and Queensland	800–1,000 metres (2,600–3,300 ft)
	Sarcochilus ceciliae F.Muell., 1865	fairy bells	Queensland and New South Wales	150–900 metres (490–2,950 ft)
	Sarcochilus chrysanthus Schltr., 1913		New Guinea	1,000–2,400 metres (3,300–7,900 ft)
	Sarcochilus dilatatus F.Muell., 1859	brown butterfly orchid	Queensland and New South Wales	0–400 metres (0–1,312 ft)
	Sarcochilus falcatus R.Br., 1810	orange blossom orchid	Queensland, New South Wales and Victoria	100–1,400 metres (330–4,590 ft)
	Sarcochilus fitzgeraldii F.Muell., 1870	ravine orchid	Queensland and New South Wales	500–800 metres (1,600–2,600 ft)
	Sarcochilus gildasii N.Hallé, 1986		New Caledonia	
	Sarcochilus hartmannii F.Muell., 1874	large boulder orchid	eastern Australia	0–1,000 metres (0–3,281 ft)
	Sarcochilus hillii (F.Muell.) F.Muell, 1860	myrtle bells	Australia and New Caledonia	0–800 metres (0–2,625 ft)
	Sarcochilus hirticalcar (Dockrill) M.A.Clem. & B.J.Wallace, 1998	harlequin orchid	Queensland	300–650 metres (980–2,130 ft)
	Sarcochilus iboensis Schltr., 1913		New Guinea	1,000 metres (3,300 ft)
	Sarcochilus koghiensis Schltr., 1911		New Caledonia	
	Sarcochilus odoratus Schltr., 1913		New Guinea	200 metres (660 ft)
	Sarcochilus parviflorus Lindl., 1838	southern lawyer orchid, green tree orchid	New South Wales	600 metres (2,000 ft)
	Sarcochilus rarus Schltr., 1906		New Caledonia	
	Sarcochilus serrulatus D.L.Jones, 1972	banded butterfly orchid	Queensland	900–600 metres (3,000–2,000 ft)
	Sarcochilus spathulatus R.S.Rogers, 1927	small butterfly orchid	Queensland and New South Wales	0–600 metres (0–1,969 ft)
	Sarcochilus thycola (N.Hallé) M.A.Clem., D.L.Jones & D.P.Banks, 2019		New Caledonia	
	Sarcochilus tricalliatus (Rupp) Rupp, 1951		Queensland	200–800 metres (660–2,620 ft)
	Sarcochilus uniflorus Schltr., 1913		New Guinea	1,000–2,200 metres (3,300–7,200 ft)
	Sarcochilus weinthalii F.M.Bailey, 1903	blotched butterfly orchid	Queensland and New South Wales	300–700 metres (980–2,300 ft)

== Use in horticulture ==
The term "sarco" is often used to refer to a number of orchid genera, including Sarcochilus. Most species of Sarcochilus are easily grown but some are very difficult. They need bright light, high humidity and free air movement.
