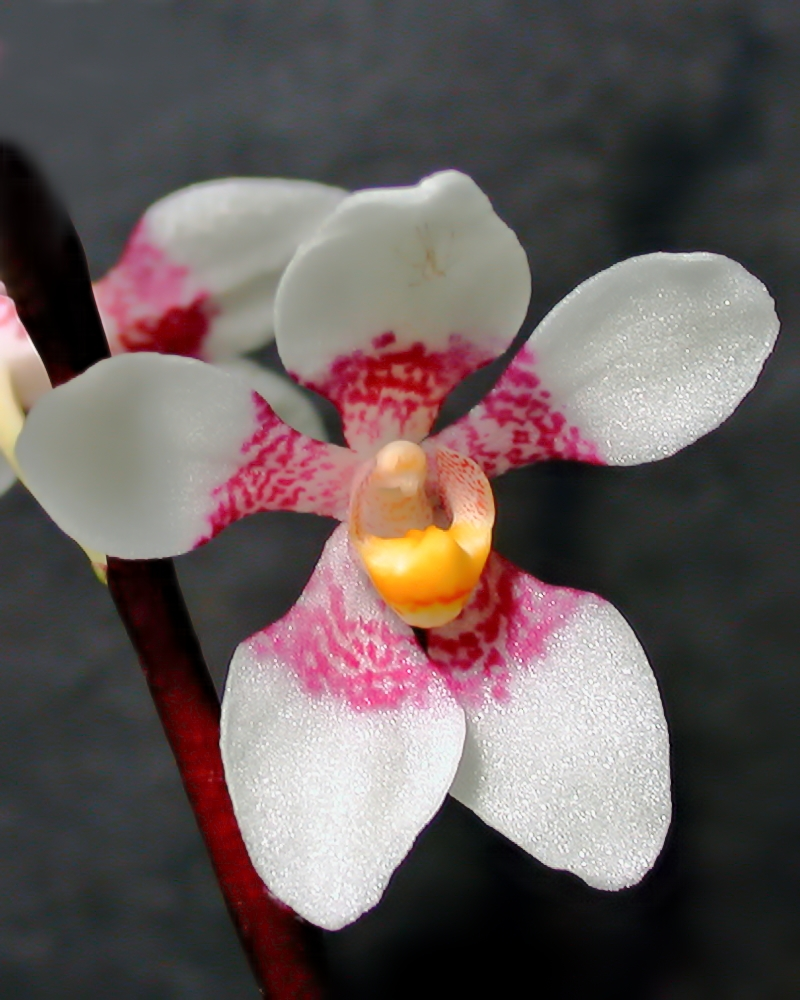

Conservation status
- Vulnerable (EPBC Act)

Scientific classification
- Kingdom: Plantae
- Clade: Tracheophytes
- Clade: Angiosperms
- Clade: Monocots
- Order: Asparagales
- Family: Orchidaceae
- Subfamily: Epidendroideae
- Genus: Sarcochilus
- Species: S. fitzgeraldii

Binomial name
- Sarcochilus fitzgeraldii F.Muell.

Synonyms
- Sarcochilus fitzgeraldii var. albus W.Schmidt; Sarcochilus fitzgeraldii var. aemulus Rupp; Sarcochilus fitzgeraldii f. aemulus (Rupp) M.Wolff & O.Gruss; Sarcochilus fitzgeraldii f. albus (W.Schmidt) M.Wolff & O.Gruss

= Sarcochilus fitzgeraldii =

Ravine orchid

Species of orchid

Sarcochilus fitzgeraldii, commonly known as the ravine orchid, is a lithophytic orchid endemic to eastern Australia. It forms large clumps with between four and eight dark green, linear leaves and up to fifteen white flowers with crimson spots near the centre.

== Description ==
Sarcochilus fitzgeraldii is a lithophytic herb with stems 200–500 mm (7.9–20 in) long and which forms large clumps on rocks. It has between four and eight dark green, linear leaves 100–200 mm (3.9–7.9 in) long and 10–15 mm (0.4–0.6 in) wide. Between four and fifteen white flowers with many crimson spots near the centre, 25–30 mm (0.98–1.2 in) long and wide are arranged on an arching flowering stem 100–250 mm (3.9–9.8 in) long. The sepal and petals are 12–17 mm (0.47–0.67 in) long and 5–9 mm (0.20–0.35 in) wide, the dorsal sepal slightly shorter and narrower than the lateral sepals and the petals narrower than both. The labellum is thick and waxy, about 5 mm (0.2 in) long and 7 mm (0.28 in) wide and has three lobes. The side lobes are erect and the middle lobe is short and fleshy. Flowering occurs between October and November.

== Taxonomy and naming ==
Sarcochilus fitzgeraldii was first formally described in 1870 by Ferdinand von Mueller and the description was published in Fragmenta phytographiae Australiae from a specimen collected near the Bellinger River by Robert Fitzgerald. The specific epithet (fitzgeraldii) honours the collector of the type specimen.

== Distribution and habitat ==
The ravine orchid usually grows on rocks in dense rainforest or in shady gorges and ravines but sometimes also on the base of fibrous-barked trees. It is found between Maleny in south-east Queensland and the Macleay River in New South Wales.

== Conservation ==
This orchid is class as "vulnerable" under the Australian Government Environment Protection and Biodiversity Conservation Act 1999 and the New South Wales Government Biodiversity Conservation Act 2016. The main threat to the species is illegal collecting. It was formerly an abundant species but has suffered from over-collecting.
