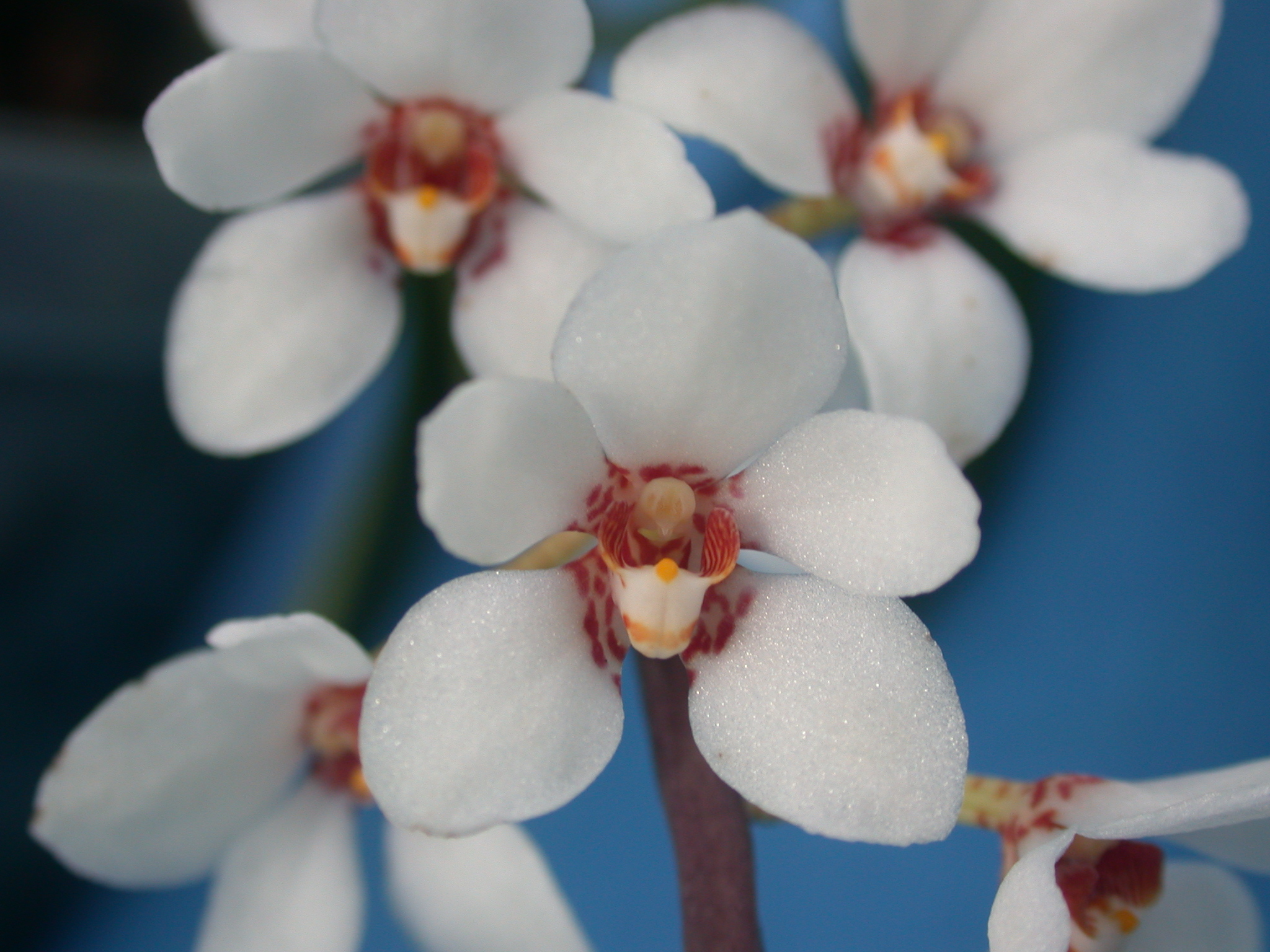

Conservation status
- Vulnerable (EPBC Act)

Scientific classification
- Kingdom: Plantae
- Clade: Tracheophytes
- Clade: Angiosperms
- Clade: Monocots
- Order: Asparagales
- Family: Orchidaceae
- Subfamily: Epidendroideae
- Genus: Sarcochilus
- Species: S. hartmannii

Binomial name
- Sarcochilus hartmannii F.Muell.

Synonyms
- Sarcochilus fitzgeraldi var. rubicentrum Maiden & Betche orth. var.; Sarcochilus fitzgeraldii var. rubricentrum (Fitzg.) Maiden & Betche; Sarcochilus hartmanni F.Muell. orth. var.; Sarcochilus rubricentrum Fitzg.; Sarcochilus rubricentrum Fitzg. isonym; Thrixspermum hartmannii (F.Muell.) Rchb.f.; Thrixspermum rubricentrum (Fitzg.) Rchb.f.; Thrixspermum rubrocinctum Rchb.f. orth. var.

= Sarcochilus hartmannii =

Large boulder orchid

Species of orchid

Sarcochilus hartmannii, commonly known as the large boulder orchid', ravine orchid, Hartmann's sarcochilus or cliff orchid, is a lithophytic orchid endemic to eastern Australia. It forms spreading clumps with between four and ten thick, channelled leaves and up to twenty five white flowers with crimson spots near the centre.

== Description ==
Sarcochilus hartmannii is a lithophytic (sometimes an epiphyte or terrestrial) herb with stems 200–800 mm (7.9–31 in) long and which forms spreading clumps, usually on rocks. It has between four and ten thick, channelled linear to oblong or triangular leaves 80–200 mm (3.1–7.9 in) long and 15–20 mm (0.6–0.8 in) wide. Between five and twenty five white flowers with crimson spots near the centre, 25–30 mm (0.98–1.2 in) long and wide are crowded on an arching flowering stem 100–250 mm (3.9–9.8 in) long. The sepal are 12–16 mm (0.47–0.63 in) long and 5–8 mm (0.20–0.31 in) wide, the petals 10–14 mm (0.39–0.55 in) long and 4–6 mm (0.16–0.24 in) wide. The labellum is 2–3 mm (0.08–0.1 in) long, thick and waxy with three lobes. The side lobes are erect, about 3 mm (0.12 in) high and wide and the middle lobe is short and fleshy. Flowering occurs between September and November.

== Taxonomy and naming ==
Sarcochilus hartmannii was first formally described in 1874 by Ferdinand von Mueller and the description was published in Fragmenta phytographiae Australiae from a specimen collected near Toowoomba by Carl Heinrich Hartmann. The specific epithet (hartmannii) honours the collector of the type specimen.

== Distribution and habitat ==
The large boulder orchid usually grows on boulders and cliffs, rarely on trees or cycads. It is found between Gympie in south-east Queensland and the Richmond River in New South Wales.

== Conservation ==
This orchid is classed as "vulnerable" under the Australian Government Environment Protection and Biodiversity Conservation Act 1999 and the New South Wales Government Biodiversity Conservation Act 2016. The main threats to the species are illegal collecting and weed invasion.
