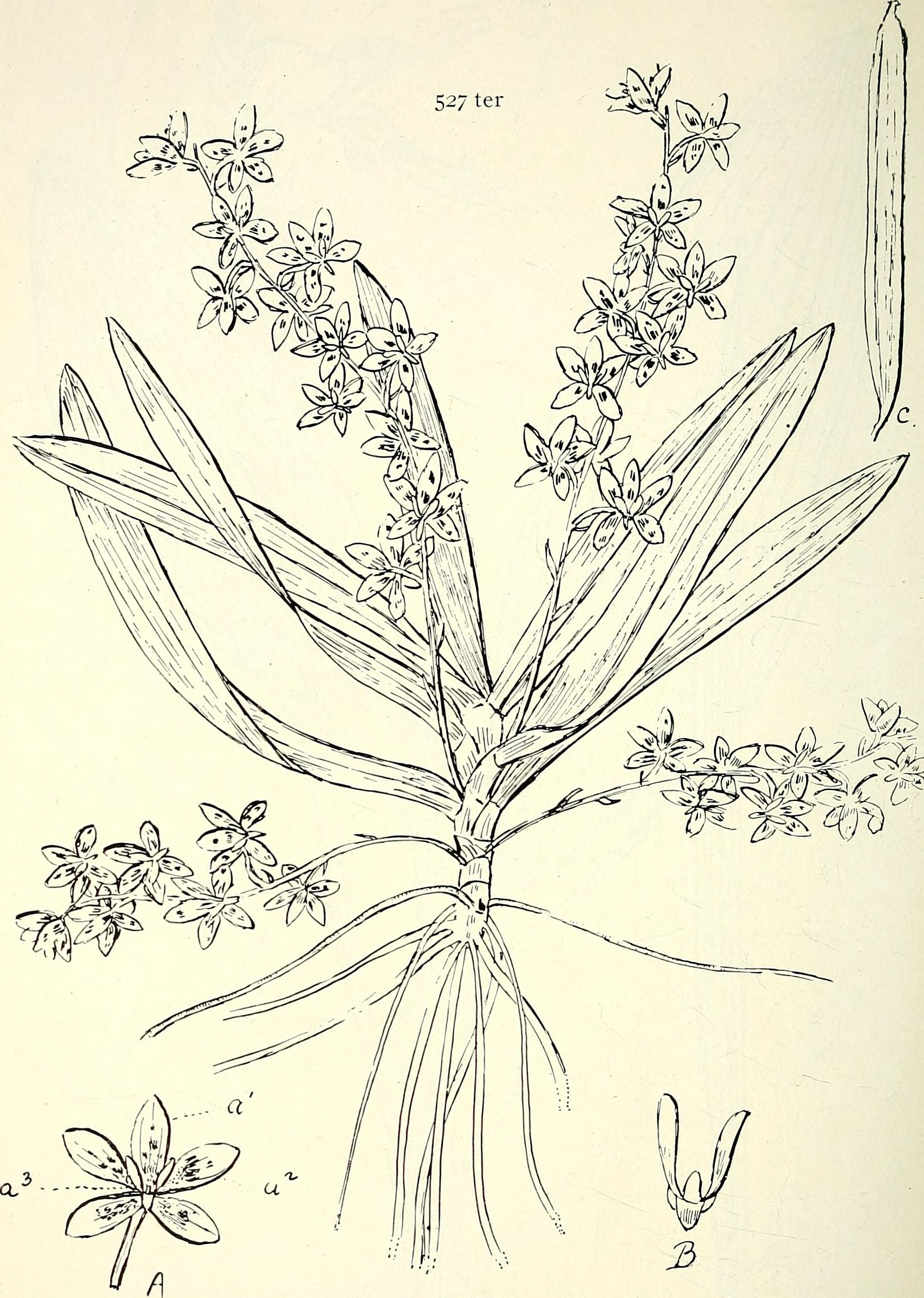

Conservation status
- Vulnerable (EPBC Act)

Scientific classification
- Kingdom: Plantae
- Clade: Tracheophytes
- Clade: Angiosperms
- Clade: Monocots
- Order: Asparagales
- Family: Orchidaceae
- Subfamily: Epidendroideae
- Genus: Sarcochilus
- Species: S. weinthalii

Binomial name
- Sarcochilus weinthalii R.S.Rogers

Synonyms
- Parasarcochilus weinthalii (F.M.Bailey) Dockrill; Sarcochilus longmanii F.M.Bailey

= Sarcochilus weinthalii =

Blotched butterfly orchid

Species of orchid

Sarcochilus weinthalii, commonly known as blotched butterfly orchid, is a small epiphytic orchid endemic to eastern Australia. It has between three and seven thin, leathery, yellowish green leaves and up to twelve cream-coloured flowers with large purple or reddish blotches.

== Description ==
Sarcochilus weinthalii is a small epiphytic herb with stems 40–80 mm (2–3 in) long and between three and seven thin, leathery, yellowish green leaves 50–90 mm (2.0–3.5 in) long and 10–12 mm (0.4–0.5 in) wide. Between three and twelve cream-coloured flowers with large purple or reddish blotches, 12–16 mm (0.47–0.63 in) long and 12–15 mm (0.47–0.59 in) wide are arranged on a pendulous stem 50–70 mm (2–3 in) long. The sepals and petals are elliptic to spatula-shaped and the flowers are sometimes cup-shaped. The dorsal sepal is 7–10 mm (0.28–0.39 in) long and 3–4 mm (0.12–0.16 in) wide whilst the lateral sepals are slightly longer and wider. The petals are 6–9 mm (0.24–0.35 in) long and about 3–4 mm (0.12–0.16 in) wide. The labellum is cream-coloured with purplish markings, about 1.5 mm (0.06 in) long with three lobes. The side lobes are erect, about 4 mm (0.2 in) long and curved inwards and the middle lobe has a rounded, fleshy spur about 2 mm (0.08 in) long. Flowering occurs between August and October.

== Taxonomy and naming ==
Sarcochilus weinthalii was first formally described in 1904 by Frederick Manson Bailey and the description was published in the Queensland Agricultural Journal from a specimen collected near Toowoomba by Ferdinand August Weinthal. The specific epithet (weinthalii) honours the collector of the type specimen.

== Distribution and habitat ==
Blotched butterfly orchid grows in forest and scrub in hilly between the Bunya Mountains in Queensland and the Richmond River in New South Wales.

== Conservation ==
This orchid is classed as "vulnerable" under the Australian Government Environment Protection and Biodiversity Conservation Act 1999 and the New South Wales Government Biodiversity Conservation Act 2016. The main threats to the species are illegal collecting and inappropriate fire regimes.
