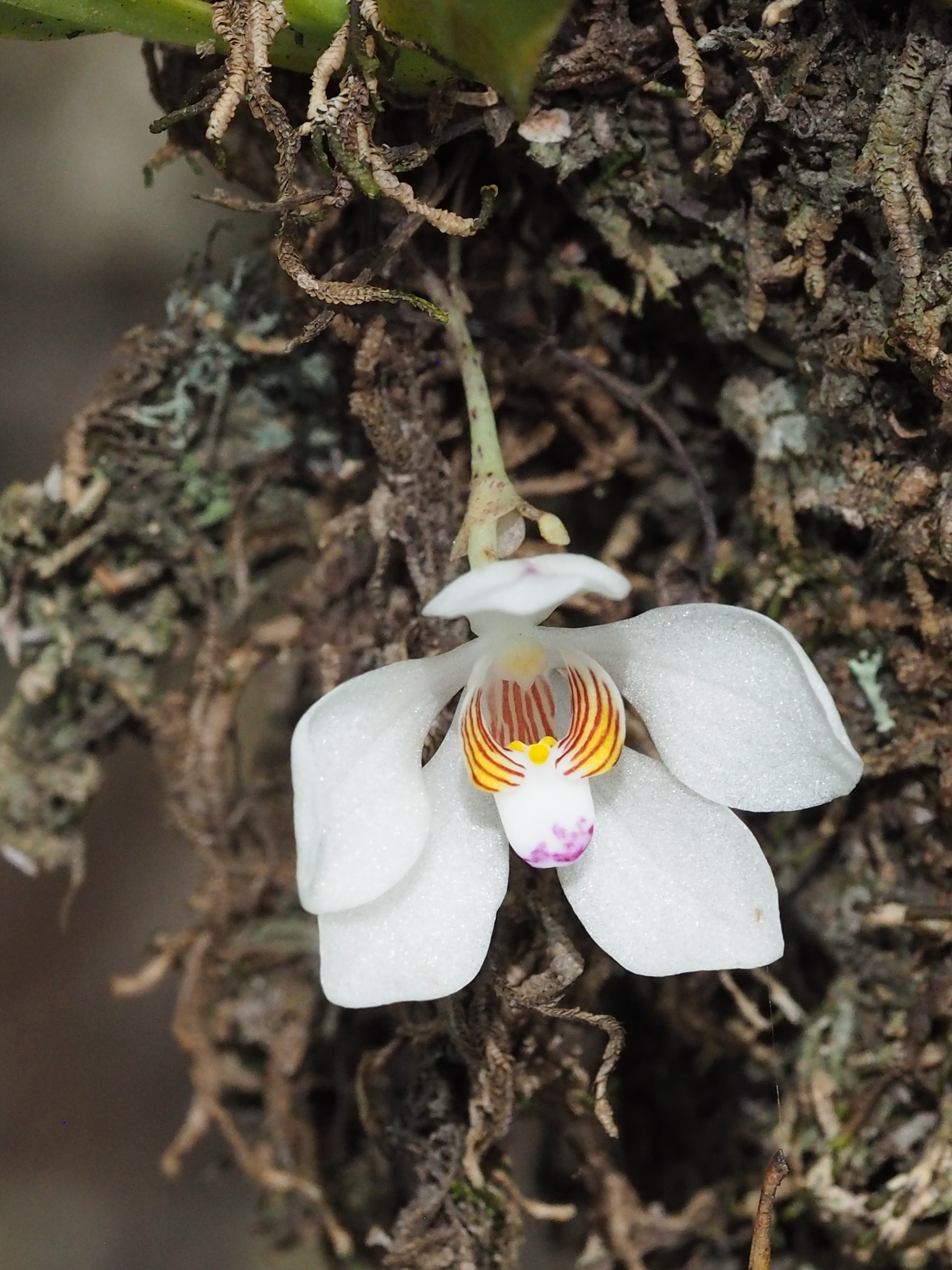
- In Dorrigo National Park

Conservation status
- Least Concern (IUCN 3.1)

Scientific classification
- Kingdom: Plantae
- Clade: Tracheophytes
- Clade: Angiosperms
- Clade: Monocots
- Order: Asparagales
- Family: Orchidaceae
- Subfamily: Epidendroideae
- Genus: Sarcochilus
- Species: S. falcatus

Binomial name
- Sarcochilus falcatus R.Br.

Synonyms
- Sarcochiluis montanus Dockrill orth. var.; SSarcochilus falcatus R.Br. var. falcatus; SSarcochilus falcatus var. montanus (Fitzg.) Fitzg.; SSarcochilus falcatus var. montanus (Fitzg.) F.M.Bailey isonym; SSarcochilus montanus Fitzg.; SThrixspermum falcatum (R.Br.) Rchb.f.

= Sarcochilus falcatus =

Orange blossom orchid

Species of orchid

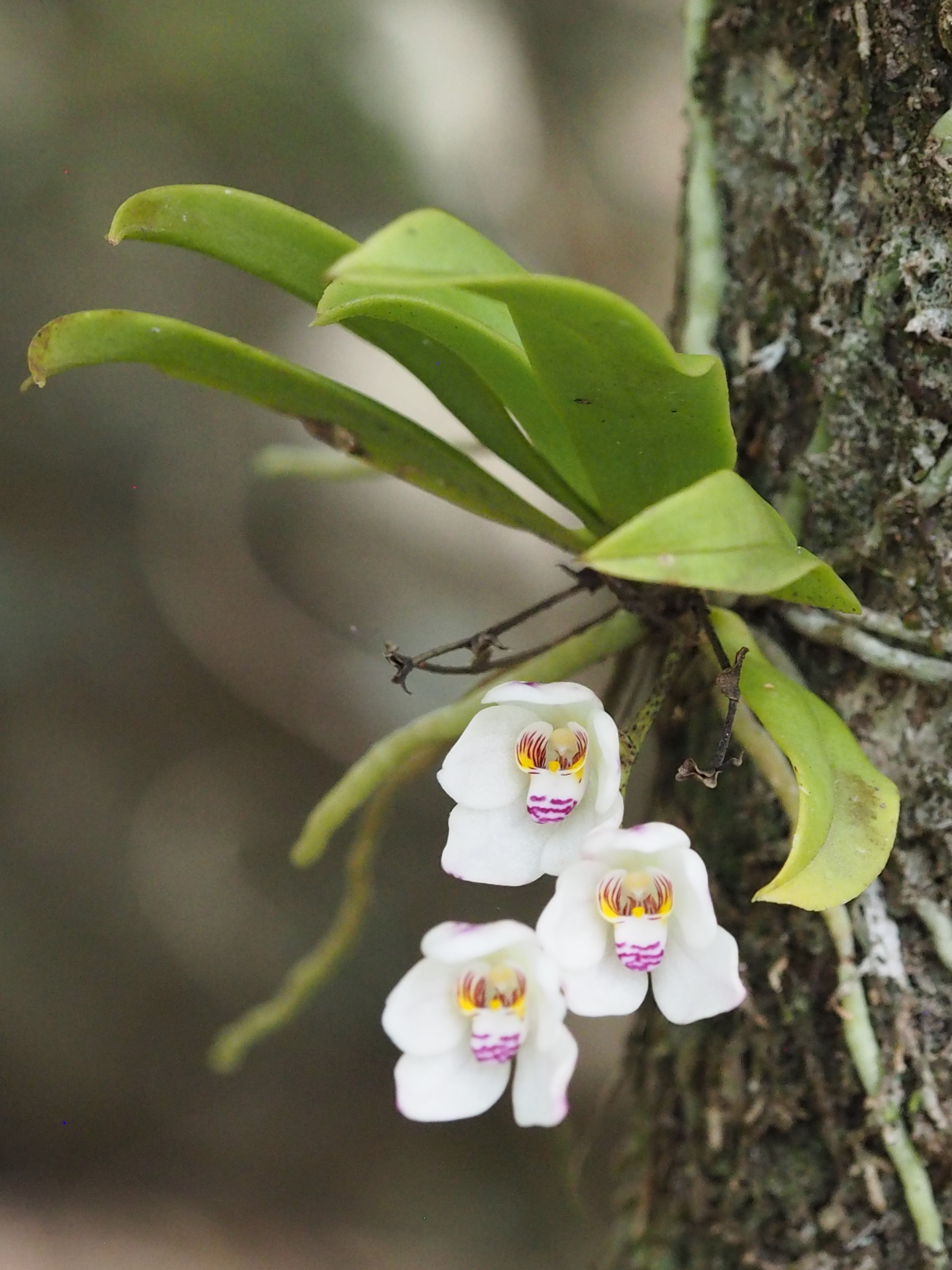
Whole plant

Sarcochilus falcatus, commonly known as orange blossom orchid, is a small epiphytic or lithophytic orchid that is endemic to eastern Australia. It has up to eight, leathery leaves with fine teeth on the edges and up to twelve white to cream-coloured flowers with a white labellum that has orange and purple markings.

== Description ==
Sarcochilus falcatus is a small epiphytic or lithophytic herb with a stem 40–80 mm (2–3 in) long with between three and eight leathery, often curved leaves 60–160 mm (2–6 in) long and 15–20 mm (0.59–0.79 in) wide with fine teeth on the edges. Between three and twelve white to cream-coloured, fragrant flowers 20–30 mm (0.79–1.2 in) long and wide are arranged on an arching flowering stem 70–180 mm (2.8–7.1 in) long. The sepals and petals are egg-shaped, spread widely apart from each other and are 10–16 mm (0.39–0.63 in) long and 5–7 mm (0.2–0.3 in) wide. The labellum is white with orange and purple markings, 4–6 mm (0.16–0.24 in) long with three lobes. The side lobes are erect, about 7 mm (0.3 in) long and 5 mm (0.2 in) wide and the middle lobe is short and fleshy. Flowering occurs between June and October.

== Taxonomy and naming ==
Sarcochilus falcatus was first formally described in 1810 by Robert Brown who published the description in Prodromus Florae Novae Hollandiae et Insulae Van Diemen. It was the first species of Sarcochilus to be described and is therefore the type species. The specific epithet (falcatus) is a Latin word meaning "sickle-shaped" or "curved", referring to the shape of the leaves.

== Distribution and habitat ==
Orange blossom orchid grows on trees but sometimes on rocks, usually in places exposed to air movement, clouds and drizzly weather. It grows in the Cedar Bay National Park in Queensland and south to the coast and nearby tablelands of New South Wales. It rarely occurs in the far north-eastern corner of Victoria.

== Ecology ==
A species of Ceratobasidium was isolated from a specimen of S. falcatus collected near Dungog.

== Conservation ==
This orchid is classed as "endangered" in Victoria under the Victorian Government Flora and Fauna Guarantee Act 1988. It is classified as "least concern" (LC) by the IUCN Red List of Threatened Species.
