= Sarcochilus spathulatus =

Small butterfly orchid

Scientific classification
- Kingdom: Plantae
- Clade: Tracheophytes
- Clade: Angiosperms
- Clade: Monocots
- Order: Asparagales
- Family: Orchidaceae
- Subfamily: Epidendroideae
- Genus: Sarcochilus
- Species: S. spathulatus

Binomial name
- Sarcochilus spathulatus R.S.Rogers

Synonyms
- Parasarcochilus spathulatus (R.S.Rogers) Dockrill; Pteroceras spathulatum (R.S.Rogers) Garay; Sarcochilus harriganiae Rupp

Species of orchid

Sarcochilus spathulatus, commonly known as the small butterfly orchid, is a small epiphytic orchid endemic to eastern Australia. It has a single, more or less pendent growth with up to ten thin, leathery leaves and up to five green to dark brown flowers with a cream-coloured labellum that has purple markings.

== Description ==
Sarcochilus spathulatus is a small epiphytic herb with a single, more or less pendent growth with stems 20–40 mm (0.8–2 in) long. There are between two and ten thin, leathery, narrow egg-shaped leaves 30–70 mm (1.2–2.8 in) long and 14–17 mm (0.6–0.7 in) wide. Up to five green to dark brown flowers 15–18 mm (0.59–0.71 in) long and 12–15 mm (0.47–0.59 in) wide are widely spaced on a pendulous flowering stem 30–50 mm (1–2 in) long. The sepals and petals are narrow oblong, often distinctly expanded near the tip. The dorsal sepal is 5–7 mm (0.20–0.28 in) long and 2–3 mm (0.079–0.12 in) wide whilst the lateral sepals are slightly longer and wider. The petals are 4–6 mm (0.16–0.24 in) long and about 2.5 mm (0.098 in) wide. The labellum is cream-coloured with purplish markings, about 5 mm (0.2 in) long with three lobes. The side lobes are erect, expanded near the tip and the middle lobe is purple. Flowering occurs between July and October.

== Taxonomy and naming ==
Sarcochilus spathulatus was first formally described in 1927 by Richard Sanders Rogers and the description was published in Transactions and Proceedings of the Royal Society of South Australia. The specific epithet (spathulatus) is derived from the Latin word spatha meaning "paddle for stirring or mixing".

== Distribution and habitat ==
The small butterfly orchid grows on the outer branches of trees in rainforest or drier forests near streams. It is found between the Bunya Mountains in Queensland and the Hunter River in New South Wales.
