= Bulbophyllum lingulatum =

Scientific classification
- Kingdom: Plantae
- Clade: Tracheophytes
- Clade: Angiosperms
- Clade: Monocots
- Order: Asparagales
- Family: Orchidaceae
- Subfamily: Epidendroideae
- Genus: Bulbophyllum
- Species: B. lingulatum

Binomial name
- Bulbophyllum lingulatum Rendle

Synonyms
- Adelopetalum lingulatum (Rendle) M.A.Clem. & D.L.Jones

Species of orchid

Bulbophyllum lingulatum is a species of orchid in the genus Bulbophyllum. It is endemic to New Caledonia.

Two forms are accepted.

- Bulbophyllum lingulatum f. lingulatum
- Bulbophyllum lingulatum f. microphyton (Guillaumin) N.Hallé
