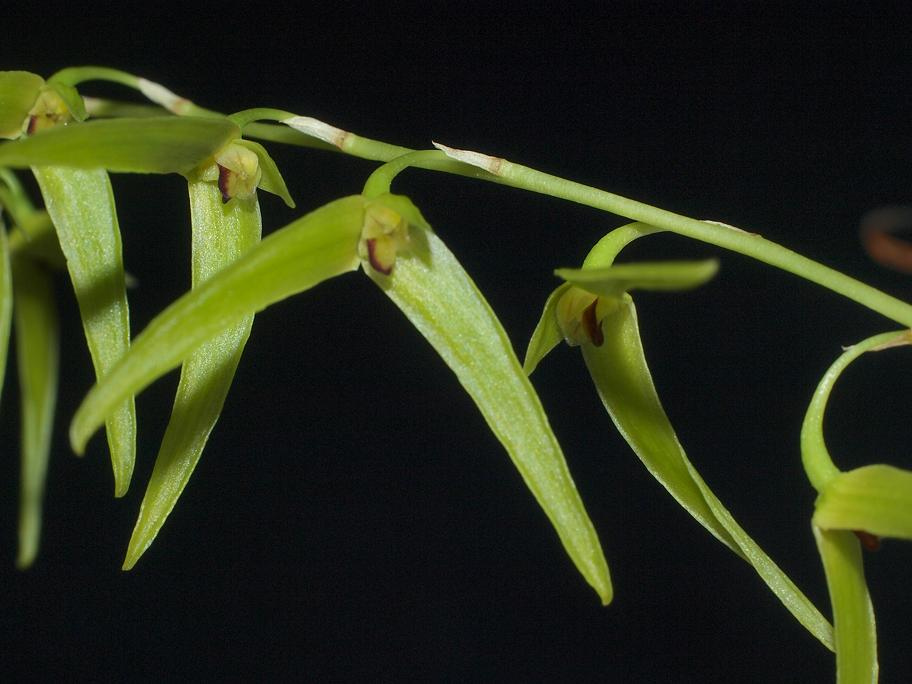

Scientific classification
- Kingdom: Plantae
- Clade: Tracheophytes
- Clade: Angiosperms
- Clade: Monocots
- Order: Asparagales
- Family: Orchidaceae
- Subfamily: Epidendroideae
- Genus: Bulbophyllum
- Species: B. elisae

Binomial name
- Bulbophyllum elisae (F.Muell.) Benth.

Synonyms
- Adelopetalum elisae (F.Muell.) D.L.Jones & M.A.Clem.; Bolbophyllum elisae F.Muell. nom. inval., pro syn.; Bolbophyllum elisae Benth. orth. var.; Cirrhopetalum elisae F.Muell.; Phyllorchis elisae Kuntze orth. var.; Phyllorkis elisae (F.Muell.) Kuntze

= Bulbophyllum elisae =

Pineapple orchid

Species of orchid

Bulbophyllum elisae, commonly known as pineapple orchid, is a species of epiphytic or lithophytic orchid that is endemic to eastern Australia. It has crowded, wrinkled, pale green or yellowish clump-forming pseudobulbs, stiff, pale green to yellowish leaves and between three and twelve pale green to dark green flowers with a dark red to purple labellum. It usually grows in the tops of rainforest trees, on cliff faces or boulders.

== Description ==
Bulbophyllum elisae is an epiphytic or lithophytic herb with crowded, wrinkled and grooved, pale green or yellowish pseudobulbs 10–30 mm (0.4–1 in) long and 15–20 mm (0.59–0.79 in) wide. The leaves are narrow oblong to lance-shaped, thin, leathery, flat, 60–100 mm (2–4 in) long and 8–12 mm (0.31–0.47 in) wide. Between three and twelve pale green to dark green flowers 15–20 mm (0.59–0.79 in) long and 10–15 mm (0.39–0.59 in) wide are arranged on one side of a thin flowering stem 150–250 mm (5.9–9.8 in) long. The dorsal sepal is egg-shaped, 6–8 mm (0.2–0.3 in) long and about 3 mm (0.12 in) wide, but the lateral sepals are much longer at 15–20 mm (0.6–0.8 in) long and 3–4 mm (0.12–0.16 in) wide. The petals are about 3 mm (0.12 in) long and 2 mm (0.079 in) wide. The labellum is purple, fleshy, about 4 mm (0.16 in) long and 2 mm (0.079 in) wide. Flowering occurs between May and November.

== Taxonomy and naming ==
Pineapple orchid was first formally described in 1868 by Ferdinand von Mueller who gave it the name Cirrhopetalum elisae and published the description in the Fragmenta phytographiae Australiae from a specimen collected near Tenterfield. In 1873, George Bentham changed the name to Bulbophyllum elisae. The specific epithet (elisae) honours Eliza Kern.

== Distribution and habitat ==
Bulbophyllum elisae grows on the highest branches of rainforest trees, sometimes on cliff faces and boulders. It occurs between the Bunya Mountains in Queensland and the Blue Mountains in New South Wales.
