= Bulbophyllum argyropus =

Silver strand orchid

Scientific classification
- Kingdom: Plantae
- Clade: Embryophytes
- Clade: Tracheophytes
- Clade: Angiosperms
- Clade: Monocots
- Order: Asparagales
- Family: Orchidaceae
- Subfamily: Epidendroideae
- Genus: Bulbophyllum
- Species: B. argyropus

Binomial name
- Bulbophyllum argyropus (Endl.) Rchb.f.

Synonyms
- Adelopetalum argyropum D.L.Jones & M.A.Clem. orth. var.; Adelopetalum argyropus (Endl.) D.L.Jones & M.A.Clem.; Bulbophyllum corythium N.Hallé; Thelychiton argyropus Endl.; Bulbophyllum exiguum auct. non F.Muell.: Mueller, F.J.H. von (1875); Bulbophyllum pygmaeum auct. non (Sm.) Lindl.: Jaede, C.H. (1962); Bulbophyllum tuberculatum auct. non Colenso: Rupp, H.M.R. (1935); Bulbophyllum tuberculatum auct. non Colenso: Clemesha, S.C. (December 1979); Bulbophyllum tuberculatum Colenso, on the Australian mainland. The Orchadian 6(6); Bulbophyllum tuberculatum auct. non Colenso: Jacobs, S.W.L. & Pickard, J. (1981)

Species of orchid from Australia

Bulbophyllum argyropus, commonly known as the silver strand orchid, is a species of epiphytic or sometimes lithophytic orchid that is endemic to eastern Australia, including Lord Howe and Norfolk Islands. It has crowded pseudobulbs, tough, dark green leaves and up to four small whitish to yellowish flowers with an orange labellum.

== Description ==
Bulbophyllum argyropus is an epiphytic, rarely an lithophytic herb with crowded, warty and furrowed pseudobulbs 5–8 mm (0.2–0.3 in) long and 4–6 mm (0.16–0.24 in) wide. Young pseudobulbs are covered with papery white bracts. There is a single tough, dark green leaf, 20–45 mm (0.8–2 in) long and 4–6 mm (0.16–0.24 in) wide on each pseudobulb. Up to five whitish or yellowish flowers 5–6 mm (0.20–0.24 in) long and about 4 mm (0.16 in) wide are arranged on a warty, thread-like flowering stem 15–30 mm (0.59–1.2 in) long. The sepals are about 4 mm (0.2 in) long and 1 mm (0.039 in) wide, the lateral sepals are 14–18 mm (0.55–0.71 in) long, the petals about 1 mm (0.039 in) long and wide. The labellum is orange, about 3 mm (0.12 in) long and 2 mm (0.079 in) wide curved and fleshy. Flowering occurs between August and December.

== Taxonomy and naming ==
The silver strand orchid was first formally described in 1833 by Stephan Endlicher who gave it the name Thelychiton argyropus and published the description in Prodromus Florae Norfolkicae. In 1876, Heinrich Gustav Reichenbach changed the name to Bulbophyllum argyropus. The specific epithet (argyropus) is derived from the Ancient Greek words argyros meaning "silver" and pous meaning "foot".

== Distribution and habitat ==
Bulbophyllum argyropus usually grows on the highest branches of rainforest trees, rarely on rocks. It occurs between the McPherson Range in Queensland and the Dorrigo Plateau in New South Wales as well as on Lord Howe and Norfolk Islands. It has also been reported from New Caledonia.
