= Bulbophyllum corythium =

Scientific classification
- Kingdom: Plantae
- Clade: Tracheophytes
- Clade: Angiosperms
- Clade: Monocots
- Order: Asparagales
- Family: Orchidaceae
- Subfamily: Epidendroideae
- Genus: Bulbophyllum
- Species: B. corythium

Binomial name
- Bulbophyllum corythium N.Hallé (1981)

Synonyms
- Adelopetalum corythium (N.Hallé) M.A.Clem., H.C.Zimmer & D.L.Jones (2024)

Species of orchid

Bulbophyllum corythium is a species of orchid in the genus Bulbophyllum. It is endemic to New Caledonia.
