= Mount Alexandra (Queensland) =

Mountain in Queensland, Australia

Highest point
- Elevation: 561 m (1,841 ft)
- Coordinates: 16.2502778°S 145.4647222°E

Naming
- Native name: Walu Wugirriga

Geography
- Location: Queensland, Australia

Mount Alexandra (also known as Alexandra Mountain) is a mountain in Queensland, Australia, near the Daintree Rainforest, and part of the Mount Alexandra Reserve.
