= List of Australian plant species authored by Ferdinand von Mueller =

This is a list of Australian plant species authored by Ferdinand von Mueller, including naturalised species:

== A ==
- Abrophyllum ornans (F.Muell.) Benth.
- Abrotanella nivigena (F.Muell.) F.Muell.
- Abrotanella scapigera (F.Muell.) Benth.
- Abutilon cryptopetalum (F.Muell.) Benth.
- Abutilon exonemum F.Muell.
- Abutilon halophilum F.Muell.
- Abutilon lepidum (F.Muell.) A.S.Mitch.
- Abutilon leucopetalum (F.Muell.) Benth.
- Abutilon longilobum F.Muell.
- Abutilon macrum F.Muell.
- Abutilon otocarpum F.Muell.
- Abutilon oxycarpum (F.Muell.) Benth.
- Acacia acanthoclada F.Muell.
- Acacia acradenia F.Muell.
- Acacia adnata F.Muell.
- Acacia alpina F.Muell.
- Acacia amblyophylla F.Muell.
- Acacia amentifera F.Muell.
- Acacia aneura F.Muell. ex Benth.
- Acacia armitii F.Muell. ex Maiden
- Acacia asperulacea F.Muell.
- Acacia baileyana F.Muell.
- Acacia burkittii F.Muell. ex Benth.
- Acacia cambagei F.Muell. ex R.T.Baker
- Acacia cincinnata F.Muell.
- Acacia conjunctifolia F.Muell.
- Acacia conspersa F.Muell.
- Acacia craspedocarpa F.Muell.
- Acacia cyperophylla F.Muell. ex Benth.
- Acacia dallachiana F.Muell.
- Acacia dempsteri F.Muell.
- Acacia denticulosa F.Muell.
- Acacia dictyophleba F.Muell.
- Acacia dietrichiana F.Muell.
- Acacia drepanocarpa F.Muell.
- Acacia estrophiolata F.Muell.
- Acacia fasciculifera F.Muell. ex Benth.
- Acacia gilesiana F.Muell.
- Acacia gonocarpa F.Muell.
- Acacia gonoclada F.Muell.
- Acacia gregorii F.Muell.
- Acacia harpophylla F.Muell. ex Benth.
- Acacia hemignosta F.Muell.
- Acacia homaloclada F.Muell.
- Acacia howittii F.Muell.
- Acacia imbricata F.Muell.
- Acacia iteaphylla F.Muell. ex Benth.
- Acacia jonesii F.Muell. & Maiden
- Acacia kelleri F.Muell.
- Acacia kempeana F.Muell.
- Acacia lachnophylla F.Muell.
- Acacia leptophleba F.Muell. ex Benth.
- Acacia limbata F.Muell.
- Acacia lysiphloia F.Muell.
- Acacia maidenii F.Muell.
- Acacia maitlandii F.Muell.
- Acacia megalantha F.Muell.
- Acacia merrallii F.Muell.
- Acacia microcarpa F.Muell.
- Acacia minutifolia F.Muell.
- Acacia murrayana F.Muell. ex Benth.
- Acacia nematophylla F.Muell. ex Benth.
- Acacia notabilis F.Muell.
- Acacia nyssophylla F.Muell.
- Acacia oldfieldii F.Muell.
- Acacia oligoneura F.Muell.
- Acacia oraria F.Muell.
- Acacia orthocarpa F.Muell.
- Acacia oshanesii F.Muell. & Maiden
- Acacia oswaldii F.Muell.
- Acacia oxyclada F.Muell. ex Benth.
- Acacia pachycarpa F.Muell. ex Benth.
- Acacia peuce F.Muell.
- Acacia phlebocarpa F.Muell.
- Acacia platycarpa F.Muell.
- Acacia praelongata F.Muell.
- Acacia pravifolia F.Muell.
- Acacia pravissima F.Muell. ex Benth.
- Acacia ptychophylla F.Muell.
- Acacia pycnostachya F.Muell. ex Benth.
- Acacia quadrimarginea F.Muell.
- Acacia quadrisulcata F.Muell.
- Acacia retivenea F.Muell.
- Acacia rhigiophylla F.Muell. ex Benth.
- Acacia rossei F.Muell.
- Acacia rupicola F.Muell. ex Benth.
- Acacia sclerosperma F.Muell.
- Acacia sessiliceps F.Muell.
- Acacia signata F.Muell.
- Acacia spondylophylla F.Muell.
- Acacia stipuligera F.Muell.
- Acacia stipulosa F.Muell.
- Acacia strongylophylla F.Muell.
- Acacia subporosa F.Muell.
- Acacia subternata F.Muell.
- Acacia subtilinervis F.Muell.
- Acacia sutherlandii (F.Muell.) F.Muell.
- Acacia tayloriana F.Muell.
- Acacia tenuissima F.Muell.
- Acacia tetragonophylla F.Muell.
- Acacia trineura F.Muell.
- Acacia triptycha F.Muell. ex Benth.
- Acacia tumida F.Muell. ex Benth.
- Acacia volubilis F.Muell.
- Acacia wattsiana F.Muell. ex Benth.
- Acacia wilhelmiana F.Muell.
- Acanthocladium dockeri F.Muell.
- Aceratium megalospermum (F.Muell.) Balgooy
- Achnophora tatei F.Muell.
- Aciphylla glacialis (F.Muell.) Benth.
- Aciphylla simplicifolia (F.Muell.) Benth.
- Ackama paniculosa (F.Muell.) Hoogland
- Acmena hemilampra (F.Muell.) Merr. & L.M.Perry
- Acomis acoma (F.Muell.) Druce
- Acomis macra F.Muell.
- Acradenia euodiiformis (F.Muell.) T.G.Hartley
- Acronychia acidula F.Muell.
- Acronychia acronychioides (F.Muell.) T.G.Hartley
- Acronychia imperforata F.Muell.
- Acronychia octandra (F.Muell.) T.G.Hartley
- Acronychia vestita F.Muell.
- Acronychia wilcoxiana (F.Muell.) T.G.Hartley
- Acrotriche prostrata F.Muell.
- Acsmithia davidsonii (F.Muell.) Hoogland
- Actinotus gibbonsii F.Muell.
- Actinotus humilis (F.Muell. & Tate) Domin
- Actinotus moorei F.Muell. ex Rodway
- Actinotus omnifertilis (F.Muell.) Benth.
- Actinotus schwarzii F.Muell.
- Adansonia gregorii F.Muell.
- Adenanthera abrosperma F.Muell.
- Adenanthos detmoldii F.Muell.
- Adenanthos dobsonii F.Muell.
- Adenanthos flavidiflorus F.Muell.
- Adenanthos forrestii F.Muell.
- Adriana hookeri (F.Muell.) Mull.Arg.
- Adriana klotzschii (F.Muell.) Mull.Arg.
- Agapetes meiniana F.Muell.
- Agathis robusta (F.Muell.) F.M.Bailey
- Aglaia sapindina (F.Muell.) Harms
- Agonis obtusissima F.Muell.
- Akania lucens (F.Muell.) Airy Shaw
- Alectryon connatus (F.Muell.) Radlk.
- Alectryon diversifolius (F.Muell.) S.T.Reynolds
- Alectryon semicinereus (F.Muell.) Radlk.
- Alectryon subdentatus (F.Muell. ex Benth.) Radlk.
- Alectryon tomentosus (F.Muell.) Radlk.
- Allittia cardiocarpa (F.Muell. ex Benth.) P.S.Short
- Allocasuarina acuaria (F.Muell.) L.A.S.Johnson
- Allocasuarina acutivalvis (F.Muell.) L.A.S.Johnson
- Allocasuarina corniculata (F.Muell.) L.A.S.Johnson
- Allocasuarina decaisneana (F.Muell.) L.A.S.Johnson
- Allocasuarina inophloia (F.Muell. & F.M.Bailey) L.A.S.Johnson
- Allopterigeron filifolius (F.Muell.) Dunlop
- Alloxylon wickhamii (W.Hill ex F.Muell.) P.H.Weston & Crisp
- Alpinia arctiflora (F.Muell.) Benth.
- Alpinia modesta F.Muell. ex K.Schum.
- Alpinia racemigera F.Muell.
- Alstonia constricta F.Muell.
- Alstonia ophioxyloides F.Muell.
- Althoffia pleiostigma (F.Muell.) Burret
- Alyxia ilicifolia F.Muell.
- Alyxia lindii F.Muell.
- Alyxia squamulosa C.Moore & F.Muell.
- Amaranthus pallidiflorus F.Muell.
- Amomum dallachyi F.Muell.
- Ampelocissus acetosa (F.Muell.) Planch.
- Amphipogon caricinus F.Muell.
- Amyema sanguinea (F.Muell.) Danser
- Amylotheca dictyophleba (F.Muell.) Tiegh.
- Ancana stenopetala F.Muell.
- Andersonia latiflora (F.Muell.) Benth.
- Andersonia macranthera F.Muell.
- Anemocarpa podolepidium (F.Muell.) Paul G.Wilson
- Angianthus brachypappus F.Muell.
- Angianthus microcephalus (F.Muell.) Benth.
- Angophora subvelutina F.Muell.
- Anisotome procumbens (F.Muell.) C.J.Webb
- Anopterus macleayanus F.Muell.
- Anthobolus foveolatus F.Muell.
- Anthobolus leptomerioides F.Muell.
- Anthocercis angustifolia F.Muell.
- Anthocercis fasciculata F.Muell.
- Anthocercis intricata F.Muell.
- Anthotroche walcottii F.Muell.
- Antidesma parvifolium F.Muell.
- Aotus phylicoides F.Muell. ex Benth.
- Aotus tietkensii F.Muell.
- Aphelia brizula F.Muell.
- Aphelia pumilio F.Muell. ex Sond.
- Apodytes brachystylis F.Muell.
- Apophyllum anomalum F.Muell.
- Aporum sphenochilum (F.Muell. & Kraenzl.) M.A.Clem.
- Arabidella (F.Muell.) O.E.Schulz
- Arabidella eremigena (F.Muell.) E.A.Shaw
- Arabidella filifolia (F.Muell.) E.A.Shaw
- Arabidella nasturtium (F.Muell.) E.A.Shaw
- Arabidella trisecta (F.Muell.) O.E.Schulz
- Aralia macdowallii (F.Muell.) F.M.Bailey
- Archidendron hendersonii (F.Muell.) I.C.Nielsen
- Archidendron lucyi F.Muell.
- Archidendron ramiflorum (F.Muell.) Kosterm.
- Archidendron vaillantii (F.Muell.) F.Muell.
- Archidendropsis basaltica (F.Muell.) I.C.Nielsen
- Archidendropsis thozetiana (F.Muell.) I.C.Nielsen
- Archirhodomyrtus beckleri (F.Muell.) A.J.Scott
- Archontophoenix alexandrae (F.Muell.) H.Wendl. & Drude
- Ardisia brevipedata F.Muell.
- Ardisia pachyrrhachis (F.Muell.) F.M.Bailey
- Argentipallium spiceri (F.Muell.) Paul G.Wilson
- Argophyllum lejourdanii F.Muell.
- Argyrodendron trifoliolatum F.Muell.
- Aristida behriana F.Muell.
- Aristida contorta F.Muell.
- Aristolochia deltantha F.Muell.
- Aristolochia holtzei F.Muell.
- Aristolochia praevenosa F.Muell.
- Aristolochia thozetii F.Muell.
- Aristotelia australasica F.Muell.
- Arthrochilus huntianus (F.Muell.) Blaxell
- Arthrochilus irritabilis F.Muell.
- Arytera divaricata F.Muell.
- Arytera foveolata F.Muell.
- Asperula geminifolia F.Muell.
- Asplenium simplicifrons F.Muell.
- Astartea ambigua F.Muell.
- Astartea intratropica F.Muell.
- Astelia psychrocharis F.Muell.
- Asteridea athrixioides (Sond. & F.Muell.) Kroner
- Asteridea chaetopoda (F.Muell.) Kroner
- Asteridea croniniana (F.Muell.) Kroner
- Asterolasia asteriscophora (F.Muell.) Druce
- Asterolasia phebalioides F.Muell.
- Asterolasia trymalioides F.Muell.
- Astrebla pectinata (Lindl.) F.Muell. ex Benth.
- Astroloma conostephioides (Sond.) F.Muell. ex Benth.
- Astrotricha asperifolia F.Muell. ex Klatt
- Astrotricha biddulphiana F.Muell.
- Astrotricha hamptonii F.Muell.
- Atalaya hemiglauca (F.Muell.) F.Muell. ex Benth.
- Atalaya variifolia (F.Muell.) Benth.
- Atkinsonia ligustrina (Lindl.) F.Muell.
- Atractocarpus benthamianus (F.Muell.) Puttock
- Atractocarpus chartaceus (F.Muell.) Puttock
- Atractocarpus fitzalanii (F.Muell.) Puttock
- Atractocarpus hirtus (F.Muell.) Puttock
- Atractocarpus sessilis (F.Muell.) Puttock
- Atractocarpus stipularis (F.Muell.) Puttock
- Atriplex bunburyana F.Muell.
- Atriplex conduplicata F.Muell.
- Atriplex elachophylla F.Muell.
- Atriplex exilifolia F.Muell.
- Atriplex fissivalvis F.Muell.
- Atriplex holocarpa F.Muell.
- Atriplex humilis F.Muell.
- Atriplex incrassata F.Muell.
- Atriplex leptocarpa F.Muell.
- Atriplex lobativalvis F.Muell.
- Atriplex quinii F.Muell.
- Atriplex rhagodioides F.Muell.
- Atriplex spongiosa F.Muell.
- Atriplex velutinella F.Muell.
- Auranticarpa melanosperma (F.Muell.) L.Cayzer, Crisp & I.Telford
- Australorchis monophylla (F.Muell.) Brieger
- Austromyrtus lasioclada (F.Muell.) L.S.Sm.
- Austrosteenisia blackii (F.Muell.) Geesink
- Austrostipa aristiglumis (F.Muell.) S.W.L.Jacobs & J.Everett
- Austrostipa tuckeri (F.Muell.) S.W.L.Jacobs & J.Everett

== B ==
- Babingtonia crenulata (F.Muell.) A.R.Bean
- Babingtonia densifolia (Sm.) F.Muell.
- Babingtonia pluriflora (F.Muell.) A.R.Bean
- Babingtonia virgata (J.R.Forst. & G.Forst.) F.Muell.
- Backhousia angustifolia F.Muell.
- Backhousia citriodora F.Muell.
- Backhousia sciadophora F.Muell.
- Baeckea blackettii F.Muell.
- Baeckea corynophylla (F.Muell.) F.Muell.
- Baeckea crispiflora (F.Muell.) F.Muell.
- Baeckea cryptandroides F.Muell.
- Baeckea ericaea F.Muell. ex Benth.
- Baeckea ochropetala F.Muell.
- Baeckea ovalifolia (F.Muell.) F.Muell.
- Baeckea pentagonantha F.Muell.
- Baeckea polyandra F.Muell.
- Baeckea polystemonea F.Muell.
- Baeckea robusta F.Muell.
- Baeckea subcuneata F.Muell.
- Baeckea utilis F.Muell. ex Miq.
- Balanops australiana F.Muell.
- Ballantinia antipoda (F.Muell.) E.A.Shaw
- Bambusa arnhemica F.Muell.
- Banksia blechnifolia F.Muell.
- Banksia elderiana F.Muell. & Tate
- Banksia ornata F.Muell. ex Meisn.
- Banksia petiolaris F.Muell.
- Barklya syringifolia F.Muell.
- Basedowia tenerrima (F.Muell. & Tate) J.M.Black
- Bauera sessiliflora F.Muell.
- Bauhinia carronii F.Muell.
- Bauhinia hookeri F.Muell.
- Beaufortia interstans F.Muell.
- Beaufortia orbifolia F.Muell.
- Beccariella xerocarpa (F.Muell. ex Benth.) Aubrev.
- Beilschmiedia obtusifolia (Meisn.) F.Muell.
- Bergia pedicellaris (F.Muell.) Benth.
- Bergia perennis (F.Muell.) Benth.
- Bertya dimerostigma F.Muell.
- Bertya findlayi F.Muell.
- Bertya opponens (F.Muell. ex Benth.) Guymer
- Bertya pedicellata F.Muell.
- Bertya pomaderroides F.Muell.
- Bertya rotundifolia F.Muell.
- Beyeria lepidopetala F.Muell.
- Beyeria opaca F.Muell.
- Beyeria tristigma F.Muell.
- Billardiera cymosa F.Muell.
- Billardiera floribunda (Putt.) F.Muell.
- Billardiera fraseri (Hook.) F.Muell.
- Billardiera lehmanniana F.Muell.
- Billardiera sericophora F.Muell.
- Billardiera speciosa (Endl.) F.Muell.
- Billardiera versicolor F.Muell. ex Klatt
- Blechnum articulatum (F.Muell.) S.B.Andrews
- Blechnum fullagari (F.Muell.) C.Chr.
- Blepharocarya involucrigera F.Muell.
- Bobea myrtoides (F.Muell.) Valeton
- Boea hygroscopica F.Muell.
- Boea kinneari (F.Muell.) B.L.Burtt
- Boehmeria calophleba C.Moore & F.Muell.
- Bonamia rosea (F.Muell.) Hallier f.
- Boronia adamsiana F.Muell.
- Boronia algida F.Muell.
- Boronia baeckeacea F.Muell.
- Boronia barkeriana F.Muell.
- Boronia bowmanii F.Muell.
- Boronia busselliana F.Muell.
- Boronia coerulescens F.Muell.
- Boronia defoliata F.Muell.
- Boronia filifolia F.Muell.
- Boronia gracilipes F.Muell.
- Boronia grandisepala F.Muell.
- Boronia heterophylla F.Muell.
- Boronia lanceolata F.Muell.
- Boronia nematophylla F.Muell.
- Boronia repanda (F.Muell. ex Maiden & Betche) Maiden & Betche
- Boronia wilsonii (F.Muell. ex Benth.) Duretto
- Borya septentrionalis F.Muell.
- Bosistoa medicinalis (F.Muell.) T.G.Hartley
- Bosistoa pentacocca (F.Muell.) Baill.
- Bossiaea armitii F.Muell.
- Bossiaea bracteosa F.Muell. ex Benth.
- Bossiaea neo-anglica F.Muell.
- Bossiaea scortechinii F.Muell.
- Bossiaea stephensonii F.Muell.
- Bossiaea walkeri F.Muell.
- Bossiaea webbii F.Muell.
- Bothriochloa erianthoides (F.Muell.) C.E.Hubb.
- Bouchardatia neurococca (F.Muell.) Baill.
- Brachyachne convergens (F.Muell.) Stapf
- Brachychiton discolor F.Muell.
- Brachychiton gregorii F.Muell.
- Brachyloma concolor (F.Muell.) Benth.
- Brachyloma depressum (F.Muell.) Benth.
- Brachyloma scortechinii F.Muell.
- Brachyscome basaltica F.Muell.
- Brachyscome cheilocarpa F.Muell.
- Brachyscome chrysoglossa F.Muell.
- Brachyscome graminea (Labill.) F.Muell.
- Brachyscome latisquamea F.Muell.
- Brachyscome leptocarpa F.Muell.
- Brachyscome microcarpa F.Muell.
- Brachyscome nivalis F.Muell.
- Brachyscome ptychocarpa F.Muell.
- Brachyscome segmentosa C.Moore & F.Muell.
- Brachyscome trachycarpa F.Muell.
- Brachysola coerulea (F.Muell. & Tate) Rye
- Brachysola halganiacea (F.Muell.) Rye
- Brachystelma glabriflorum (F.Muell.) Schltr.
- Bridelia exaltata F.Muell.
- Brombya platynema F.Muell.
- Buchanania mangoides F.Muell.
- Buckinghamia celsissima F.Muell.
- Bulbophyllum baileyi F.Muell.
- Bulbophyllum elisae (F.Muell.) Benth.
- Bulbophyllum exiguum F.Muell.
- Bulbophyllum nematopodum F.Muell.

== C ==
- Cadellia pentastylis F.Muell.
- Cadetia taylori (F.Muell.) Schltr.
- Caelospermum paniculatum F.Muell.
- Caelospermum reticulatum (F.Muell.) Benth.
- Caesalpinia nitens (F.Muell. ex Benth.) Pedley
- Caesalpinia scortechinii (F.Muell.) Hattink
- Caesia chlorantha F.Muell.
- Caesia rigidifolia F.Muell.
- Cajanus cinereus (Benth.) F.Muell.
- Cajanus confertiflorus F.Muell.
- Cajanus marmoratus (Benth.) F.Muell.
- Cajanus reticulatus (Aiton) F.Muell.
- Caladenia cairnsiana F.Muell.
- Calandrinia brevipedata F.Muell.
- Calandrinia pleiopetala F.Muell.
- Calandrinia ptychosperma F.Muell.
- Calandrinia pumila (Benth.) F.Muell.
- Calandrinia quadrivalvis F.Muell.
- Calandrinia spergularina F.Muell.
- Calandrinia strophiolata (F.Muell.) Poelln.
- Calandrinia uniflora F.Muell.
- Caldesia oligococca (F.Muell.) Buchenau
- Callerya megasperma (F.Muell.) Schot
- Callistemon coccineus F.Muell.
- Callistemon pityoides F.Muell.
- Callistemon teretifolius F.Muell.
- Callitris columellaris F.Muell.
- Callitris drummondii (Parl.) F.Muell.
- Callitris macleayana (F.Muell.) F.Muell.
- Callitris muelleri (Parl.) F.Muell.
- Callitris roei (Endl.) F.Muell.
- Callitris verrucosa (A.Cunn. ex Endl.) F.Muell.
- Calocephalus aervoides (F.Muell.) Benth.
- Calocephalus francisii (F.Muell.) Benth.
- Calocephalus knappii (F.Muell.) Ewart & Jean White
- Calocephalus platycephalus (F.Muell.) Benth.
- Calocephalus sonderi F.Muell.
- Calochilus holtzei F.Muell.
- Calophanoides hygrophiloides (F.Muell.) R.M.Barker
- Calothamnus blepharospermus F.Muell.
- Calothamnus chrysantherus F.Muell.
- Calothamnus gilesii F.Muell.
- Calothamnus homalophyllus F.Muell.
- Calothamnus longissimus F.Muell.
- Calothamnus microcarpus F.Muell.
- Calothamnus oldfieldii F.Muell.
- Calothamnus pinifolius F.Muell.
- Calotis anthemoides F.Muell.
- Calotis cymbacantha F.Muell.
- Calotis glandulosa F.Muell.
- Calotis hispidula (F.Muell.) F.Muell.
- Calotis kempei F.Muell.
- Calotis latiuscula F.Muell. & Tate
- Calotis plumulifera F.Muell.
- Calotis pubescens (F.Muell. ex Benth.) N.G.Walsh & K.L.McDougall
- Caltha introloba F.Muell.
- Calytrix achaeta (F.Muell.) Benth.
- Calytrix arborescens (F.Muell.) Benth.
- Calytrix birdii (F.Muell.) B.D.Jacks.
- Calytrix brachychaeta (F.Muell.) Benth.
- Calytrix creswellii (F.Muell.) B.D.Jacks.
- Calytrix harvestiana (F.Muell.) Craven
- Calytrix longiflora (F.Muell.) Benth.
- Calytrix megaphylla (F.Muell.) Benth.
- Calytrix merrelliana (F.Muell. & Tate) Craven
- Calytrix plumulosa (F.Muell.) B.D.Jacks.
- Calytrix purpurea (F.Muell.) Craven
- Camptacra brachycomoides (F.Muell.) N.T.Burb. f. brachycomoides
- Canarium australianum F.Muell.
- Canthium coprosmoides F.Muell.
- Canthium vacciniifolium F.Muell.
- Capparis arborea (F.Muell.) Maiden
- Capparis humistrata (F.Muell.) F.Muell.
- Capparis nobilis (Endl.) F.Muell. ex Benth.
- Capparis ornans F.Muell. ex Benth.
- Capparis shanesiana F.Muell.
- Capparis thozetiana (F.Muell.) F.Muell.
- Cardwellia sublimis F.Muell.
- Carex alsophila F.Muell.
- Carex cephalotes F.Muell.
- Carex contracta F.Muell.
- Carex hypandra F.Muell. ex Benth.
- Carex lobolepis F.Muell.
- Carex neurochlamys F.Muell.
- Carex polyantha F.Muell.
- Carex tereticaulis F.Muell.
- Carmichaelia exsul F.Muell.
- Carnarvonia araliifolia F.Muell.
- Carpha nivicola F.Muell.
- Carronia multisepalea F.Muell.
- Carronia protensa (F.Muell.) Diels
- Cartonema philydroides F.Muell.
- Casearia dallachii F.Muell.
- Cassia brewsteri (F.Muell.) F.Muell. ex Benth.
- Cassia cardiosperma F.Muell.
- Cassia magnifolia F.Muell.
- Cassia notabilis F.Muell.
- Cassia oligoclada F.Muell.
- Cassia pleurocarpa F.Muell.
- Cassia venusta F.Muell.
- Cassinia compacta F.Muell.
- Cassinia leptocephala F.Muell.
- Cassinia ozothamnoides (F.Muell.) Orchard
- Cassinia subtropica F.Muell.
- Cassinia theodori F.Muell.
- Cassytha phaeolasia (F.Muell.) F.Muell.
- Cassytha phaeolasia (F.Muell.) F.Muell.
- Castanospora alphandii (F.Muell.) F.Muell.
- Casuarina pauper F.Muell. ex L.A.S.Johnson
- Cayratia acris (F.Muell.) Domin
- Cayratia clematidea (F.Muell.) Domin
- Celastrus australis Harvey & F.Muell. ex F.Muell.
- Cenchrus elymoides F.Muell.
- Centipeda racemosa (Hook.) F.Muell.
- Centipeda thespidioides F.Muell.
- Centrolepis glabra (F.Muell. ex Sond.) Hieron.
- Cephalaralia cephalobotrys (F.Muell.) Harms
- Ceraia macfarlanei (F.Muell.) M.A.Clem.
- Ceraia macfarlanei (F.Muell.) M.A.Clem.
- Ceratanthus longicornis (F.Muell.) G.Taylor
- Ceratopetalum virchowii F.Muell.
- Chamaescilla corymbosa (R.Br.) F.Muell. ex Benth.
- Chamaexeros fimbriata (F.Muell.) Benth.
- Cheilanthes fragillima F.Muell.
- Cheilanthes pumilio (R.Br.) F.Muell.
- Chenopodium cristatum (F.Muell.) F.Muell.
- Chenopodium nitrariaceum (F.Muell.) F.Muell. ex Benth.
- Chiloschista phyllorhiza (F.Muell.) Schltr.
- Chionachne cyathopoda (F.Muell.) F.Muell. ex Benth.
- Chionanthus quadristamineus F.Muell.
- Chionanthus quadristamineus F.Muell.
- Chionohebe densifolia (F.Muell.) B.G.Briggs & Ehrend.
- Chordifex amblycoleus (F.Muell.) B.G.Briggs & L.A.S.Johnson
- Chordifex chaunocoleus (F.Muell.) B.G.Briggs & L.A.S.Johnson
- Chordifex gracilior (F.Muell. ex Benth.) B.G.Briggs & L.A.S.Johnson
- Choretrum candollei F.Muell. ex Benth.
- Choretrum spicatum F.Muell.
- Choricarpia leptopetala (F.Muell.) Domin
- Chrysocephalum podolepidium (F.Muell.) Anderb.
- Chrysocephalum pterochaetum F.Muell.
- Chrysogonum ecliptoides (F.Muell.) F.Muell.
- Chrysogonum trichodesmoides (F.Muell.) F.Muell.
- Chthonocephalus tomentellus (F.Muell.) Benth.
- Cinnamomum baileyanum (F.Muell. ex F.M.Bailey) W.D.Francis
- Cinnamomum laubatii F.Muell.
- Cissus cardiophylla (F.Muell.) Jackes
- Cissus opaca F.Muell.
- Cissus penninervis (F.Muell.) Planch.
- Citronella smythii (F.Muell.) R.A.Howard
- Citrus australasica F.Muell.
- Claoxylon tenerifolium F.Muell.
- Clematicissus angustissima (F.Muell.) Planch.
- Clematis fawcettii F.Muell.
- Cleome cleomoides (F.Muell.) H.H.Iltis
- Cleome oxalidea F.Muell.
- Clerodendrum holtzei F.Muell.
- Clerodendrum lanceolatum F.Muell.
- Clerodendrum tracyanum (F.Muell.) F.Muell. ex Benth.
- Cochlospermum gregorii F.Muell.
- Codonocarpus cotinifolius (Desf.) F.Muell.
- Codonocarpus pyramidalis (F.Muell.) F.Muell.
- Coelandria smillieae (F.Muell.) Fitzg.
- Coleocoma centaurea F.Muell.
- Colobanthus pulvinatus F.Muell.
- Colysis ampla (F.Muell. ex Benth.) Copel.
- Colysis sayeri (F.Muell. & Baker) Copel.
- Comesperma defoliatum F.Muell.
- Comesperma patentifolium F.Muell.
- Comesperma polygaloides F.Muell.
- Comesperma praecelsum F.Muell.
- Comesperma rhadinocarpum F.Muell.
- Comesperma spinosum F.Muell.
- Comesperma viscidulum F.Muell.
- Commelina agrostophylla F.Muell.
- Commersonia craurophylla (F.Muell.) F.Muell.
- Commersonia melanopetala F.Muell.
- Commersonia tatei F.Muell. ex Tate
- Connarus conchocarpus F.Muell.
- Conospermum coerulescens F.Muell.
- Conospermum toddii F.Muell.
- Conostylis androstemma F.Muell.
- Conostylis bealiana F.Muell.
- Conostylis petrophiloides F.Muell. ex Benth.
- Conostylis seorsiflora F.Muell.
- Conostylis stylidioides F.Muell.
- Conostylis teretiuscula F.Muell.
- Convolvulus crispifolius F.Muell.
- Coopernookia strophiolata (F.Muell.) Carolin
- Coprosma lanceolaris F.Muell.
- Coprosma putida F.Muell.
- Corchorus allenii F.Muell.
- Corchorus cunninghamii F.Muell.
- Corchorus elachocarpus F.Muell.
- Corchorus elderi F.Muell.
- Corchorus macropetalus (F.Muell.) Domin
- Corchorus sidoides F.Muell.
- Corchorus tomentellus F.Muell.
- Corchorus walcottii F.Muell.
- Cordyline manners-suttoniae F.Muell.
- Cordyline murchisoniae F.Muell.
- Corokia carpodetoides (F.Muell.) L.S.Sm.
- Correa aemula (Lindl.) F.Muell.
- Correa baeuerlenii F.Muell.
- Correa decumbens F.Muell.
- Corymbia abergiana (F.Muell.) K.D.Hill & L.A.S.Johnson
- Corymbia aspera (F.Muell.) K.D.Hill & L.A.S.Johnson
- Corymbia confertiflora (F.Muell.) K.D.Hill & L.A.S.Johnson
- Corymbia dichromophloia (F.Muell.) K.D.Hill & L.A.S.Johnson
- Corymbia latifolia (F.Muell.) K.D.Hill & L.A.S.Johnson
- Corymbia papuana (F.Muell.) K.D.Hill & L.A.S.Johnson
- Corymbia polycarpa (F.Muell.) K.D.Hill & L.A.S.Johnson
- Corymbia polysciada (F.Muell.) K.D.Hill & L.A.S.Johnson
- Corymbia ptychocarpa (F.Muell.) K.D.Hill & L.A.S.Johnson
- Corymbia tessellaris (F.Muell.) K.D.Hill & L.A.S.Johnson
- Corymbia torelliana (F.Muell.) K.D.Hill & L.A.S.Johnson
- Corymbia trachyphloia (F.Muell.) K.D.Hill & L.A.S.Johnson
- Corymbia watsoniana (F.Muell.) K.D.Hill & L.A.S.Johnson
- Corynotheca lateriflora (R.Br.) F.Muell. ex Benth.
- Costus potierae F.Muell.
- Craspedia leucantha F.Muell.
- Crassula pedicellosa (F.Muell.) Ostenf.
- Cratystylis conocephala (F.Muell.) S.Moore
- Cratystylis conocephala (F.Muell.) S.Moore x Cratystylis microphylla S.Moore
- Crinum uniflorum F.Muell.
- Croninia kingiana (F.Muell.) J.M.Powell
- Crotalaria crispata F.Muell. ex Benth.
- Crotalaria eremaea F.Muell.
- Croton acronychioides F.Muell.
- Croton phebalioides (F.Muell.) Mull.Arg.
- Croton stigmatosus F.Muell.
- Croton tomentellus F.Muell.
- Croton triacros F.Muell.
- Crowea exalata F.Muell.
- Crypsinus simplicissimus (F.Muell.) S.B.Andrews
- Cryptandra hispidula Reissek & F.Muell.
- Cryptandra humilis (Benth.) F.Muell.
- Cryptandra lanosiflora F.Muell.
- Cryptandra longistaminea F.Muell.
- Cryptandra nudiflora F.Muell.
- Cryptandra pumila (F.Muell.) F.Muell.
- Cryptandra spyridioides F.Muell.
- Cryptandra waterhousei (F.Muell.) F.Muell.
- Cryptocarya hypospodia F.Muell.
- Cryptocarya mackinnoniana F.Muell.
- Cryptocarya murrayi F.Muell.
- Cullen balsamicum (F.Muell.) J.W.Grimes
- Cullen lachnostachys (F.Muell.) J.W.Grimes
- Cullen leucanthum (F.Muell.) J.W.Grimes
- Cullen martinii (F.Muell.) J.W.Grimes
- Cullen parvum (F.Muell.) J.W.Grimes
- Cullen pustulatum (F.Muell.) J.W.Grimes
- Cullen walkingtonii (F.Muell.) J.W.Grimes
- Cupaniopsis foveolata (F.Muell.) Radlk.
- Cupaniopsis serrata (F.Muell.) Radlk.
- Cupaniopsis tomentella (F.Muell. ex Benth.) S.T.Reynolds
- Cupaniopsis wadsworthii (F.Muell.) Radlk.
- Cuphonotus andraeanus (F.Muell.) Airy Shaw
- Cuphonotus humistratus (F.Muell.) O.E.Schulz
- Cuttsia viburnea F.Muell.
- Cyanostegia cyanocalyx (F.Muell.) C.A.Gardner
- Cyathea cooperi (Hook. ex F.Muell.) Domin
- Cyathea leichhardtiana (F.Muell.) Copel.
- Cyathea macarthurii (F.Muell.) Benth.
- Cyathea rebeccae (F.Muell.) Domin
- Cyathea robertsiana (F.Muell.) Domin
- Cyathea woollsiana (F.Muell.) Domin
- Cycas cairnsiana F.Muell.
- Cycas cairnsiana F.Muell.
- Cycas kennedyana F.Muell.
- Cycas normanbyana F.Muell.
- Cynanchum liebianum (F.Muell.) P.I.Forst.
- Cyperus bowmannii F.Muell. ex Benth.
- Cyperus decompositus (R.Br.) F.Muell.
- Cyperus ixiocarpus F.Muell.
- Cyperus ixiocarpus F.Muell.
- Cyperus pedunculosus F.Muell.
- Cyphanthera anthocercidea (F.Muell.) Haegi
- Cyphanthera myosotidea (F.Muell.) Haegi
- Cyphanthera odgersii (F.Muell.) Haegi
- Cyphanthera racemosa (F.Muell.) Haegi
- Cypselocarpus haloragoides (F.Muell. ex Benth.) F.Muell.
- Cyrtandra baileyi F.Muell.

== D ==
- Dampiera candicans F.Muell.
- Dampiera glabriflora F.Muell.
- Dampiera loranthifolia F.Muell. ex Benth.
- Dampiera luteiflora F.Muell.
- Dampiera sacculata F.Muell. ex Benth.
- Dampiera scottiana F.Muell.
- Dampiera wellsiana F.Muell.
- Daphnandra repandula (F.Muell.) F.Muell.
- Darlingia darlingiana (F.Muell.) L.A.S.Johnson
- Darwinia homoranthoides (F.Muell.) J.M.Black
- Darwinia luehmannii F.Muell. & Tate
- Darwinia micropetala (F.Muell.) Benth.
- Darwinia neildiana F.Muell.
- Darwinia thomasii (F.Muell.) Benth.
- Datura leichhardtii F.Muell. ex Benth.
- Davidsonia jerseyana (F.Muell. ex F.M.Bailey) G.Harden & J.B.Williams
- Davidsonia pruriens F.Muell.
- Daviesia abnormis F.Muell.
- Daviesia arthropoda F.Muell.
- Daviesia cardiophylla F.Muell.
- Daviesia croniniana F.Muell.
- Daviesia nematophylla F.Muell. ex Benth.
- Daviesia pachyphylla F.Muell.
- Decaisnina signata (F.Muell. ex Benth.) Tiegh.
- Decazesia hecatocephala F.Muell.
- Delarbrea michieana (F.Muell.) F.Muell.
- Dendrobium fellowsii F.Muell.
- Dendrobium johnsoniae F.Muell.
- Dendrobium lichenastrum (F.Muell.) Kraenzl.
- Dendrobium prenticei (F.Muell.) Nicholls
- Dendrobium smillieae F.Muell.
- Dendrophthoe vitellina (F.Muell.) Tiegh.
- Denhamia celastroides (F.Muell.) Jessup
- Denhamia oleaster (Lindl.) F.Muell.
- Denhamia pittosporoides F.Muell.
- Denhamia viridissima F.M.Bailey & F.Muell. ex F.M.Bailey
- Deplanchea tetraphylla (R.Br.) F.Muell.
- Desmodium acanthocladum F.Muell.
- Desmodium nemorosum F.Muell. ex Benth.
- Desmodium rhytidophyllum F.Muell. ex Benth.
- Desmos goezeanus (F.Muell.) Jessup
- Dicarpidium monoicum F.Muell.
- Dichosciadium ranunculaceum (F.Muell.) Domin
- Dichromochlamys dentatifolia (F.Muell.) Dunlop
- Dichrostachys spicata (F.Muell.) Domin
- Dicladanthera forrestii F.Muell.
- Dicliptera armata F.Muell.
- Dicrastylis beveridgei F.Muell.
- Dicrastylis doranii F.Muell.
- Dicrastylis exsuccosa (F.Muell.) Druce
- Dicrastylis gilesii F.Muell.
- Dicrastylis lewellinii (F.Muell.) F.Muell.
- Dicrastylis nicholasii F.Muell.
- Dicrastylis parvifolia F.Muell.
- Dietes robinsoniana (C.Moore & F.Muell.) F.Muell. ex Klatt
- Digitaria ammophila (F.Muell.) Hughes
- Digitaria coenicola (F.Muell.) Hughes
- Digitaria ctenantha (F.Muell.) Hughes
- Dimorphanthera (F.Muell. ex Drude) F.Muell.
- Dimorphanthera forbesii (F.Muell.) F.Muell.
- Dimorphanthera macbainii (F.Muell.) P.F.Stevens
- Dimorphocoma minutula F.Muell. & Tate
- Dinosperma erythrococcum (F.Muell.) T.G.Hartley
- Diospyros mabacea (F.Muell.) F.Muell.
- Diospyros pentamera (F.Muell.) F.Muell.
- Diplatia grandibractea (F.Muell.) Tiegh.
- Diploglottis diphyllostegia (F.Muell.) F.M.Bailey
- Diplopeltis stuartii F.Muell.
- Diplospora ixoroides F.Muell.
- Dipodium ensifolium F.Muell.
- Dipteracanthus australasicus F.Muell.
- Dipteranthemum crosslandii F.Muell.
- Dissocarpus biflorus F.Muell.
- Dockrillia fairfaxii (F.Muell. & Fitzg.) Rauschert
- Dockrillia mortii (F.Muell.) Rauschert
- Dodonaea bursariifolia F.Muell.
- Dodonaea hexandra F.Muell.
- Dodonaea lanceolata F.Muell.
- Dodonaea lobulata F.Muell.
- Dodonaea macrossanii F.Muell. & Scort.
- Dodonaea megazyga (F.Muell.) F.Muell. ex Benth.
- Dodonaea microzyga F.Muell.
- Dodonaea oxyptera F.Muell.
- Dodonaea pachyneura F.Muell.
- Dodonaea petiolaris F.Muell.
- Dodonaea physocarpa F.Muell.
- Dodonaea platyptera F.Muell.
- Dodonaea polyzyga F.Muell.
- Dodonaea procumbens F.Muell.
- Dodonaea stenophylla F.Muell.
- Dodonaea stenozyga F.Muell.
- Dodonaea tepperi F.Muell. ex Tepper
- Dodonaea trifida F.Muell.
- Dodonaea truncatiales F.Muell.
- Dolichandrone heterophylla (R.Br.) F.Muell.
- Drabastrum (F.Muell.) O.E.Schulz
- Drabastrum alpestre (F.Muell.) O.E.Schulz
- Dracophyllum fitzgeraldii F.Muell.
- Dracophyllum minimum F.Muell.
- Dracophyllum sayeri F.Muell.
- Drosera adelae F.Muell.
- Drummondita calida (F.Muell.) Paul G.Wilson
- Drummondita hassellii (F.Muell.) Paul G.Wilson
- Dryopoa dives (F.Muell.) Vickery
- Drypetes lasiogyna (F.Muell.) Pax & K.Hoffm.
- Duboisia hopwoodii (F.Muell.) F.Muell.
- Duboisia leichhardtii (F.Muell.) F.Muell.
- Dunbaria singuliflora F.Muell.
- Durandea jenkinsii (F.Muell.) Stapf
- Dysoxylum oppositifolium F.Muell.
- Dysphania plantaginella F.Muell.
- Dysphania rhadinostachya (F.Muell.) A.J.Scott
- Dysphania simulans F.Muell. & Tate ex Tate

== E ==
- Ecdeiocolea monostachya F.Muell.
- Echinochloa lacunaria (F.Muell.) P.W.Michael & Vickery
- Eclipta platyglossa F.Muell.
- Ectrosia gulliveri F.Muell.
- Ehretia pilosula F.Muell.
- Elachanthus pusillus F.Muell.
- Elacholoma hornii F.Muell.
- Elaeocarpus arnhemicus F.Muell.
- Elaeocarpus bancroftii F.Muell.
- Elaeocarpus foveolatus F.Muell.
- Elaeocarpus grahamii F.Muell.
- Elaeocarpus holopetalus F.Muell.
- Elaeocarpus ruminatus F.Muell.
- Elaeocarpus sericopetalus F.Muell.
- Elaeodendron melanocarpum F.Muell.
- Elattostachys nervosa (F.Muell.) Radlk.
- Elattostachys xylocarpa (A.Cunn. ex F.Muell.) Radlk.
- Embelia australiana (F.Muell.) F.M.Bailey
- Emblingia calceoliflora F.Muell.
- Emmenosperma alphitonioides F.Muell.
- Empodisma gracillimum (F.Muell.) L.A.S.Johnson & D.F.Cutler
- Empusa habenarina (F.Muell.) M.A.Clem. & D.L.Jones
- Endiandra dichrophylla F.Muell.
- Endiandra hypotephra F.Muell.
- Endiandra virens F.Muell.
- Enteropogon unispiceus (F.Muell.) Clayton
- Epacris calvertiana F.Muell.
- Epacris glacialis (F.Muell.) M.Gray
- Epaltes tatei F.Muell.
- Eragrostis lacunaria F.Muell. ex Benth.
- Eragrostis megalosperma F.Muell. ex Benth.
- Eremaea acutifolia F.Muell.
- Eremaea ebracteata F.Muell.
- Eremaea violacea F.Muell.
- Eremophila adenotricha (F.Muell. ex Benth.) F.Muell.
- Eremophila battii F.Muell.
- Eremophila behriana (F.Muell.) F.Muell.
- Eremophila bignoniiflora (Benth.) F.Muell.
- Eremophila bowmanii F.Muell.
- Eremophila brevifolia (Bartl.) F.Muell.
- Eremophila christopheri F.Muell.
- Eremophila clarkei Oldfield & F.Muell.
- Eremophila crassifolia (F.Muell.) F.Muell.
- Eremophila dalyana F.Muell.
- Eremophila delisseri F.Muell.
- Eremophila dempsteri F.Muell.
- Eremophila densifolia F.Muell.
- Eremophila denticulata F.Muell.
- Eremophila divaricata (F.Muell.) F.Muell.
- Eremophila drummondii F.Muell.
- Eremophila duttonii F.Muell.
- Eremophila elderi F.Muell.
- Eremophila eriocalyx F.Muell.
- Eremophila exilifolia F.Muell.
- Eremophila forrestii F.Muell.
- Eremophila fraseri F.Muell.
- Eremophila freelingii F.Muell.
- Eremophila gibbifolia (F.Muell.) F.Muell.
- Eremophila gibsonii F.Muell.
- Eremophila gilesii F.Muell.
- Eremophila goodwinii F.Muell.
- Eremophila graciliflora F.Muell.
- Eremophila hughesii F.Muell.
- Eremophila laanii F.Muell.
- Eremophila latrobei F.Muell.
- Eremophila longifolia (R.Br.) F.Muell.
- Eremophila macdonnellii F.Muell.
- Eremophila mackinlayi F.Muell.
- Eremophila maculata (Ker Gawl.) F.Muell.
- Eremophila microtheca (F.Muell. ex Benth.) F.Muell.
- Eremophila oldfieldii F.Muell.
- Eremophila paisleyi F.Muell.
- Eremophila pantonii F.Muell.
- Eremophila phillipsii F.Muell.
- Eremophila platycalyx F.Muell.
- Eremophila polyclada (F.Muell.) F.Muell.
- Eremophila psilocalyx F.Muell.
- Eremophila racemosa (Endl.) F.Muell.
- Eremophila resinosa (Endl.) F.Muell.
- Eremophila rotundifolia F.Muell.
- Eremophila santalina (F.Muell.) F.Muell.
- Eremophila scoparia (R.Br.) F.Muell.
- Eremophila strongylophylla F.Muell.
- Eremophila weldii F.Muell.
- Eremophila willsii F.Muell.
- Eremophila youngii F.Muell.
- Eriachne agrostidea F.Muell.
- Eriachne aristidea F.Muell.
- Eriachne festucacea F.Muell.
- Eriachne melicacea F.Muell.
- Eriachne schultziana F.Muell.
- Eriachne scleranthoides F.Muell.
- Eriachne stipacea F.Muell.
- Erigeron ambiguus F.Muell.
- Erigeron conyzoides F.Muell.
- Erigeron gunnii (Hook.f.) F.Muell. ex Hook.f.
- Erigeron sessilifolius F.Muell.
- Eriocaulon australasicum (F.Muell.) Korn.
- Eriocaulon carsonii F.Muell.
- Eriocaulon concretum F.Muell.
- Eriocaulon heterogynum F.Muell.
- Eriocaulon lividum F.Muell.
- Eriocaulon monoscapum F.Muell.
- Eriocaulon spectabile F.Muell.
- Eriocaulon tortuosum F.Muell.
- Eriochiton sclerolaenoides (F.Muell.) A.J.Scott
- Erodiophyllum elderi F.Muell.
- Eryngium expansum F.Muell. ex Klatt
- Eryngium plantagineum F.Muell.
- Erythrophleum chlorostachys (F.Muell.) Baill.
- Erythroxylum australe F.Muell.
- Eucalyptus angustissima F.Muell.
- Eucalyptus baeuerlenii F.Muell.
- Eucalyptus baileyana F.Muell.
- Eucalyptus behriana F.Muell.
- Eucalyptus bigalerita F.Muell.
- Eucalyptus bosistoana F.Muell.
- Eucalyptus brachyandra F.Muell.
- Eucalyptus brevifolia F.Muell.
- Eucalyptus buprestium F.Muell.
- Eucalyptus cinerea F.Muell. ex Benth.
- Eucalyptus cladocalyx F.Muell.
- Eucalyptus cloeziana F.Muell.
- Eucalyptus cooperiana F.Muell.
- Eucalyptus cosmophylla F.Muell.
- Eucalyptus costata F.Muell. & Behr ex F.Muell.
- Eucalyptus crebra F.Muell.
- Eucalyptus decurva F.Muell.
- Eucalyptus diversicolor F.Muell.
- Eucalyptus doratoxylon F.Muell.
- Eucalyptus erythrocorys F.Muell.
- Eucalyptus eudesmioides F.Muell.
- Eucalyptus exserta F.Muell.
- Eucalyptus fasciculosa F.Muell.
- Eucalyptus fibrosa F.Muell.
- Eucalyptus ficifolia F.Muell.
- Eucalyptus foelscheana F.Muell.
- Eucalyptus gamophylla F.Muell.
- Eucalyptus goniocalyx F.Muell. ex Miq.
- Eucalyptus gracilis F.Muell.
- Eucalyptus howittiana F.Muell.
- Eucalyptus kruseana F.Muell.
- Eucalyptus lansdowneana F.Muell. & J.E.Br.
- Eucalyptus largiflorens F.Muell.
- Eucalyptus leptophleba F.Muell.
- Eucalyptus leptophylla F.Muell. ex Miq.
- Eucalyptus leucoxylon F.Muell.
- Eucalyptus longicornis (F.Muell.) F.Muell. ex Maiden
- Eucalyptus luehmanniana F.Muell.
- Eucalyptus macrandra F.Muell. ex Benth.
- Eucalyptus macrorhyncha F.Muell. ex Benth.
- Eucalyptus megacarpa F.Muell.
- Eucalyptus melanophloia F.Muell.
- Eucalyptus micranthera F.Muell. ex Benth.
- Eucalyptus microcorys F.Muell.
- Eucalyptus microtheca F.Muell.
- Eucalyptus nutans F.Muell.
- Eucalyptus ochrophloia F.Muell.
- Eucalyptus odontocarpa F.Muell.
- Eucalyptus oldfieldii F.Muell.
- Eucalyptus oleosa F.Muell. ex Miq.
- Eucalyptus orbifolia F.Muell.
- Eucalyptus pachyphylla F.Muell.
- Eucalyptus patellaris F.Muell.
- Eucalyptus pellita F.Muell.
- Eucalyptus perriniana F.Muell. ex Rodway
- Eucalyptus phoenicea F.Muell.
- Eucalyptus planchoniana F.Muell.
- Eucalyptus platyphylla F.Muell.
- Eucalyptus populnea F.Muell.
- Eucalyptus rameliana F.Muell.
- Eucalyptus raveretiana F.Muell.
- Eucalyptus regnans F.Muell.
- Eucalyptus salmonophloia F.Muell.
- Eucalyptus salubris F.Muell.
- Eucalyptus scyphocalyx (F.Muell. ex Benth.) Maiden & Blakely
- Eucalyptus sepulcralis F.Muell.
- Eucalyptus signata F.Muell.
- Eucalyptus socialis F.Muell. ex Miq.
- Eucalyptus staigeriana F.Muell. ex F.M.Bailey
- Eucalyptus tectifica F.Muell.
- Eucalyptus terminalis F.Muell.
- Eucalyptus tetragona (R.Br.) F.Muell.
- Eucalyptus tetrodonta F.Muell.
- Eucalyptus thozetiana F.Muell. ex R.T.Baker
- Eucalyptus todtiana F.Muell.
- Eucalyptus youngiana F.Muell.
- Euchilopsis linearis (Benth.) F.Muell.
- Eucryphia moorei F.Muell.
- Euodia haplophylla F.Muell.
- Euonymus australiana F.Muell.
- Euphorbia careyi F.Muell.
- Euphorbia schizolepis F.Muell. ex Boiss.
- Euphrasia alsa F.Muell.
- Eupomatia bennettii F.Muell.
- Ewartia meredithae (F.Muell.) Beauverd
- Ewartia nubigena (F.Muell.) Beauverd
- Exocarpos homalocladus C.Moore & F.Muell.
- Exocarpos syrticola (F.Muell. ex Miq.) Stauffer
- Exocarpos syrticola (F.Muell. ex Miq.) Stauffer
- Exocarya sclerioides (F.Muell.) Benth.

== F ==
- Fagraea fagraeacea (F.Muell.) Druce
- Faradaya albertisii F.Muell.
- Faradaya splendida F.Muell.
- Ficus destruens F.Muell. ex C.T.White
- Ficus mollior F.Muell. ex Benth.
- Ficus pleurocarpa F.Muell.
- Fimbristylis cardiocarpa F.Muell.
- Fimbristylis cephalophora F.Muell.
- Fimbristylis corynocarya F.Muell.
- Fimbristylis fimbristyloides (F.Muell.) Druce
- Fimbristylis microcarya F.Muell.
- Fimbristylis neilsonii F.Muell.
- Fimbristylis oxystachya F.Muell.
- Fimbristylis rhyticarya F.Muell.
- Fimbristylis solidifolia F.Muell.
- Fimbristylis squarrulosa F.Muell.
- Fimbristylis trachycarya F.Muell.
- Fimbristylis trigastrocarya F.Muell.
- Fitzalania heteropetala (F.Muell.) F.Muell.
- Flemingia schultzii (F.Muell.) Maconochie
- Flindersia bennettiana F.Muell. ex Benth.
- Flindersia bourjotiana F.Muell.
- Flindersia brayleyana F.Muell.
- Flindersia dissosperma (F.Muell.) Domin
- Flindersia ifflaiana F.Muell.
- Flindersia oppositifolia (F.Muell.) T.G.Hartley & Jessup
- Flindersia pimenteliana F.Muell.
- Flindersia schottiana F.Muell.
- Floydia praealta (F.Muell.) L.A.S.Johnson & B.G.Briggs
- Franciscodendron laurifolium (F.Muell.) B.Hyland & Steenis
- Freycinetia excelsa F.Muell.

== G ==
- Gahnia filum (Labill.) F.Muell.
- Galactia megalophylla (F.Muell.) J.H.Willis
- Galbulimima belgraveana (F.Muell.) Sprague
- Galeola foliata (F.Muell.) F.Muell.
- Garcinia warrenii F.Muell.
- Gardenia megasperma F.Muell.
- Gardenia megasperma F.Muell.
- Gardenia resinosa F.Muell.
- Gastrolobium grandiflorum F.Muell.
- Gastrolobium melanopetalum (F.Muell.) G.Chandler & Crisp
- Geijera paniculata (F.Muell.) Druce
- Geissois benthamiana F.Muell.
- Geissois biagiana (F.Muell.) F.Muell.
- Geniostoma petiolosum F.Muell.
- Gevuina bleasdalei (F.Muell.) Sleumer
- Gilesia biniflora F.Muell.
- Gillbeea adenopetala F.Muell.
- Gingidia algens (F.Muell.) J.W.Dawson
- Gingidia harveyana (F.Muell.) J.W.Dawson
- Glinus orygioides F.Muell.
- Glossogyne filifolia (F.Muell.) Benth.
- Glossogyne orthochaeta F.Muell.
- Glossogyne retroflexa F.Muell.
- Glossostigma trichodes F.Muell.
- Glyceria latispicea (F.Muell.) Benth.
- Glycocystis beckeri (F.Muell.) Chinnock MS
- Gmelina dalrympleana (F.Muell.) H.J.Lam
- Gmelina leichhardtii (F.Muell.) Benth.
- Gnephosis eriocarpa (F.Muell.) Benth.
- Gomphandra australiana F.Muell.
- Gompholobium eatoniae F.Muell.
- Gompholobium gompholobioides (F.Muell.) Crisp
- Gompholobium polyzygum F.Muell.
- Gompholobium simplicifolium (F.Muell. & Tate) Crisp
- Gomphrena affinis F.Muell. ex Benth.
- Gomphrena brachystylis F.Muell.
- Gomphrena platandra F.Muell.
- Gonocarpus confertifolius (F.Muell.) Orchard
- Gonocarpus hexandrus (F.Muell.) Orchard
- Gonocarpus leptothecus (F.Muell.) Orchard
- Gonocarpus pycnostachyus (F.Muell.) Orchard
- Goodenia amplexans F.Muell.
- Goodenia armitiana F.Muell.
- Goodenia azurea F.Muell.
- Goodenia barilletii F.Muell.
- Goodenia bicolor F.Muell. ex Benth.
- Goodenia brachypoda (F.Muell. ex Benth.) Carolin
- Goodenia calcarata (F.Muell.) F.Muell.
- Goodenia chambersii F.Muell.
- Goodenia cirrifica F.Muell.
- Goodenia corynocarpa F.Muell.
- Goodenia cusackiana (F.Muell.) Carolin
- Goodenia disperma F.Muell.
- Goodenia eatoniana F.Muell.
- Goodenia elderi F.Muell. & Tate
- Goodenia fascicularis F.Muell. & Tate
- Goodenia forrestii F.Muell.
- Goodenia glauca F.Muell.
- Goodenia goodeniacea (F.Muell.) Carolin
- Goodenia hassallii F.Muell.
- Goodenia heterochila F.Muell.
- Goodenia heteromera F.Muell.
- Goodenia heteroptera (F.Muell.) B.D.Jacks.
- Goodenia hirsuta F.Muell.
- Goodenia lamprosperma F.Muell.
- Goodenia laytoniana F.Muell. ex Benth.
- Goodenia macmillanii F.Muell.
- Goodenia macroplectra (F.Muell.) Carolin
- Goodenia microptera F.Muell.
- Goodenia minutiflora F.Muell.
- Goodenia mueckeana F.Muell.
- Goodenia odonnellii F.Muell.
- Goodenia purpurea (F.Muell.) Carolin
- Goodenia pusilliflora F.Muell.
- Goodenia racemosa F.Muell.
- Goodenia ramelii F.Muell.
- Goodenia salmoniana (F.Muell.) Carolin
- Goodenia scaevolina F.Muell.
- Goodenia sepalosa F.Muell. ex Benth.
- Goodenia stenophylla F.Muell.
- Goodenia stephensonii F.Muell.
- Goodenia stobbsiana F.Muell.
- Goodenia strangfordii F.Muell.
- Goodenia strophiolata F.Muell.
- Goodenia tenuiloba F.Muell.
- Goodenia vilmoriniae F.Muell.
- Goodenia watsonii F.Muell. & Tate
- Goodenia xanthosperma F.Muell.
- Gossia acmenoides (F.Muell.) N.Snow & Guymer
- Gossia dallachiana (F.Muell. ex Benth.) N.Snow & Guymer
- Gossia fragrantissima (F.Muell. ex Benth.) N.Snow & Guymer
- Gossia gonoclada (F.Muell. ex Benth.) N.Snow & Guymer
- Gossia myrsinocarpa (F.Muell.) N.Snow & Guymer
- Gossia shepherdii (F.Muell.) N.Snow & Guymer
- Gossypium australe F.Muell.
- Gossypium populifolium (Benth.) F.Muell.
- Gossypium robinsonii F.Muell.
- Gouania australiana F.Muell.
- Gouania hillii F.Muell.
- Grammosolen dixonii (F.Muell. & Tate) Haegi
- Graptophyllum excelsum (F.Muell.) Druce
- Graptophyllum ilicifolium (F.Muell.) Benth.
- Graptophyllum spinigerum F.Muell.
- Grastidium baileyi (F.Muell.) Rauschert
- Gratiola pumilo F.Muell.
- Gratwickia monochaeta F.Muell.
- Grevillea acerosa F.Muell.
- Grevillea acuaria F.Muell. ex Benth.
- Grevillea amplexans F.Muell. ex Benth.
- Grevillea angustiloba (F.Muell.) Downing
- Grevillea annulifera F.Muell.
- Grevillea barklyana F.Muell. ex Benth.
- Grevillea batrachioides F.Muell. ex McGill.
- Grevillea brevifolia F.Muell. ex Benth.
- Grevillea chrysophaea F.Muell. ex Meisn.
- Grevillea commutata F.Muell.
- Grevillea confertifolia F.Muell.
- Grevillea deflexa F.Muell.
- Grevillea dimidiata F.Muell.
- Grevillea dimorpha F.Muell.
- Grevillea disjuncta F.Muell.
- Grevillea erectiloba F.Muell.
- Grevillea eriobotrya F.Muell.
- Grevillea haplantha F.Muell. ex Benth.
- Grevillea hilliana F.Muell.
- Grevillea kennedyana F.Muell.
- Grevillea leiophylla F.Muell. ex Benth.
- Grevillea miqueliana F.Muell.
- Grevillea nematophylla F.Muell.
- Grevillea oligantha F.Muell.
- Grevillea paradoxa F.Muell.
- Grevillea patentiloba F.Muell.
- Grevillea pityophylla F.Muell.
- Grevillea platypoda F.Muell.
- Grevillea plurijuga F.Muell.
- Grevillea pterosperma F.Muell.
- Grevillea renwickiana F.Muell.
- Grevillea repens F.Muell. ex Meisn.
- Grevillea scortechinii (F.Muell. ex Scort.) F.Muell.
- Grevillea singuliflora F.Muell.
- Grevillea sparsiflora F.Muell.
- Grevillea stenobotrya F.Muell.
- Grevillea stenomera F.Muell.
- Grevillea trachytheca F.Muell.
- Grevillea treueriana F.Muell.
- Grevillea victoriae F.Muell.
- Guettardella putaminosa (F.Muell.) Benth.
- Guilfoylia monostylis (Benth.) F.Muell.
- Guioa semiglauca (F.Muell.) Radlk.
- Gunniopsis quadrifida (F.Muell.) Ewart
- Gunniopsis quadrifida (F.Muell.) Pax
- Gunniopsis septifraga (F.Muell.) Chinnock
- Gunniopsis zygophylloides (F.Muell.) Diels
- Gymnema pleiadenium F.Muell.
- Gynura drymophila (F.Muell.) F.G.Davies

== H ==
- Habenaria xanthantha F.Muell.
- Haeckeria cassiniiformis F.Muell.
- Haeckeria ozothamnoides F.Muell.
- Haeckeria pholidota (F.Muell.) J.H.Willis
- Haeckeria punctulata (F.Muell.) J.H.Willis
- Haegiela tatei (F.Muell.) P.S.Short & Paul G.Wilson
- Haemodorum brevicaule F.Muell.
- Haemodorum ensifolium F.Muell.
- Haemodorum simulans F.Muell.
- Haemodorum sparsiflorum F.Muell.
- Hakea bakeriana F.Muell. & Maiden
- Hakea carinata F.Muell. ex Meisn.
- Hakea chordophylla F.Muell.
- Hakea commutata F.Muell.
- Hakea francisiana F.Muell.
- Hakea grammatophylla (F.Muell.) F.Muell.
- Hakea macraeana F.Muell.
- Hakea orthorrhyncha F.Muell.
- Hakea pedunculata F.Muell.
- Hakea persiehana F.Muell.
- Hakea plurinervia F.Muell. ex Benth.
- Hakea rhombales F.Muell.
- Hakea rostrata F.Muell. ex Meisn.
- Hakea trineura (F.Muell.) F.Muell.
- Hakea verrucosa F.Muell.
- Halfordia scleroxyla F.Muell.
- Halgania andromedifolia F.Muell.
- Halgania bebrana F.Muell.
- Halgania gustafsenii F.Muell.
- Halgania solanacea F.Muell.
- Haloragis acutangula F.Muell.
- Haloragis acutangula F.Muell. f. acutangula
- Haloragis exalata F.Muell.
- Haloragis glauca f. sclopetifera (F.Muell.) Orchard
- Haloragis gossei F.Muell.
- Haloragis odontocarpa F.Muell.
- Haloragis odontocarpa F.Muell. f. odontocarpa
- Haloragis trigonocarpa F.Muell.
- Haloragodendron baeuerlenii (F.Muell.) Orchard
- Haloragodendron monospermum (F.Muell.) Orchard
- Hannafordia bissillii F.Muell.
- Hannafordia quadrivalvis F.Muell.
- Hannafordia shanesii F.Muell.
- Haplostichanthus johnsonii F.Muell.
- Harmsiodoxa blennodioides (F.Muell.) O.E.Schulz
- Harmsiodoxa brevipes (F.Muell.) O.E.Schulz
- Harpullia alata F.Muell.
- Harpullia hillii F.Muell.
- Harpullia pendula Planch. ex F.Muell.
- Hebejeebie densifolia (F.Muell.) Heads
- Hedraianthera porphyropetala F.Muell.
- Hedyotis coerulescens F.Muell.
- Hedyotis crouchiana F.Muell.
- Hedyotis galioides F.Muell.
- Hedyotis mitrasacmoides F.Muell.
- Hedyotis polyclada F.Muell.
- Hedyotis pterospora F.Muell.
- Hedyotis scleranthoides F.Muell.
- Hedyotis trachymenoides F.Muell.
- Helichrysum adenophorum F.Muell.
- Helichrysum antennarium (DC.) F.Muell. ex Benth.
- Helichrysum calvertianum (F.Muell.) F.Muell.
- Helichrysum gilesii F.Muell.
- Helichrysum lepidophyllum (Steetz) F.Muell. ex Benth.
- Helichrysum monochaetum (F.Muell.) H.Eichler
- Helichrysum oligochaetum F.Muell.
- Helichrysum oxylepis F.Muell.
- Helichrysum scutellifolium (Hook.f.) F.Muell.
- Helichrysum thomsonii F.Muell.
- Helicia australasica F.Muell.
- Helicia ferruginea F.Muell.
- Helicia glabriflora F.Muell.
- Helicteres semiglabra (F.Muell.) F.Muell. ex F.M.Bailey
- Heliohebe hulkeana (F.Muell.) Garn.-Jones
- Heliotropium conocarpum F.Muell. ex Benth.
- Heliotropium crispatum F.Muell. ex Benth.
- Heliotropium diversifolium F.Muell. ex Benth.
- Heliotropium epacrideum F.Muell. ex Benth.
- Heliotropium flintii F.Muell. ex A.S.Mitch.
- Heliotropium heteranthum (F.Muell.) Ewart & O.B.Davies
- Heliotropium pleiopterum F.Muell.
- Helipterum praecox F.Muell.
- Helmholtzia acorifolia F.Muell.
- Hemiarrhena plantaginea (F.Muell.) Benth.
- Hemichroa mesembryanthema F.Muell.
- Hemigenia biddulphiana F.Muell.
- Hemigenia brachyphylla F.Muell.
- Hemigenia curvifolia F.Muell.
- Hemigenia diplanthera F.Muell.
- Hemigenia macrantha F.Muell.
- Hemigenia obovata F.Muell.
- Hemigenia pimelifolia F.Muell.
- Hemigenia podalyrina F.Muell.
- Hemigenia teretiuscula F.Muell.
- Hemigenia tysonii F.Muell.
- Hemiphora (F.Muell.) F.Muell.
- Hemiphora elderi (F.Muell.) F.Muell.
- Hibbertia acicularis (Labill.) F.Muell.
- Hibbertia desmophylla (Benth.) F.Muell.
- Hibbertia glaberrima F.Muell.
- Hibbertia glomerosa (Benth.) F.Muell.
- Hibbertia goyderi F.Muell.
- Hibbertia hamata (F.Muell.) F.Muell.
- Hibbertia helianthemoides (Turcz.) F.Muell.
- Hibbertia huegelii (Endl.) F.Muell.
- Hibbertia humifusa F.Muell.
- Hibbertia longifolia F.Muell.
- Hibbertia melhanioides F.Muell.
- Hibbertia salicifolia (DC.) F.Muell.
- Hibbertia spicata F.Muell.
- Hibbertia stricta (DC.) F.Muell.
- Hibbertia subvaginata F.Muell.
- Hibbertia synandra F.Muell.
- Hibbertia uncinata (Benth.) F.Muell.
- Hibbertia vaginata (Benth.) F.Muell.
- Hibiscus brachychlaenus F.Muell.
- Hibiscus brachysiphonius F.Muell.
- Hibiscus coatesii F.Muell.
- Hibiscus goldsworthii F.Muell.
- Hibiscus haynaldii F.Muell.
- Hibiscus krichauffianus F.Muell.
- Hibiscus normanii F.Muell.
- Hibiscus pentaphyllus F.Muell.
- Hibiscus setulosus F.Muell.
- Hibiscus solanifolius F.Muell.
- Hibiscus zonatus F.Muell.
- Hicksbeachia pinnatifolia F.Muell.
- Hierochloe submutica F.Muell.
- Hippocratea barbata F.Muell.
- Hodgkinsonia ovatiflora F.Muell.
- Hodgsoniola junciformis (F.Muell.) F.Muell.
- Hollandaea sayeriana (F.Muell.) L.S.Sm.
- Homalium alnifolium Thwaites & F.Muell. ex F.Muell.
- Homalium brachybotrys (F.Muell.) F.Muell.
- Homalocalyx coarctatus (F.Muell.) Craven
- Homalocalyx ericaeus F.Muell.
- Homalocalyx polyandrus (F.Muell.) Benth.
- Homalocalyx staminosus (F.Muell.) Craven
- Homalocalyx thryptomenoides (F.Muell.) Craven
- Homalosciadium homalocarpum (F.Muell.) H.Eichler
- Homopholis proluta (F.Muell.) R.D.Webster
- Homoranthus wilhelmii (F.Muell.) Cheel
- Hopkinsia anoectocolea (F.Muell.) D.F.Cutler
- Hornstedtia scottiana (F.Muell.) K.Schum.
- Hovea acanthoclada (Turcz.) F.Muell.
- Hovea beckeri F.Muell.
- Howea forsteriana (C.Moore & F.Muell.) Becc.
- Howittia trilocularis F.Muell.
- Hyalosperma praecox (F.Muell.) Paul G.Wilson
- Hyalosperma semisterile (F.Muell.) Paul G.Wilson
- Hybanthus aurantiacus (Benth.) F.Muell.
- Hybanthus calycinus (DC.) F.Muell.
- Hybanthus debilissimus F.Muell.
- Hybanthus enneaspermus (L.) F.Muell.
- Hybanthus floribundus (Lindl.) F.Muell.
- Hybanthus vernonii (F.Muell.) F.Muell.
- Hydriastele wendlandiana (F.Muell.) H.Wendl. & Drude
- Hydrocotyle acutiloba (F.Muell.) N.A.Wakef.
- Hydrocotyle blepharocarpa F.Muell.
- Hydrocotyle capillaris F.Muell. ex Klatt
- Hydrocotyle comocarpa F.Muell.
- Hydrocotyle corynophora F.Muell.
- Hydrocotyle geraniifolia F.Muell.
- Hydrocotyle grammatocarpa F.Muell.
- Hydrocotyle pterocarpa F.Muell.
- Hydrocotyle rhombifolia F.Muell.
- Hydrocotyle trachycarpa F.Muell.
- Hymeneria fitzalanii (F.Muell.) M.A.Clem. & D.L.Jones
- Hymeneria kingii (F.Muell.) M.A.Clem. & D.L.Jones
- Hymenosporum flavum (Hook.) F.Muell.
- Hypocalymma longifolium F.Muell.
- Hypocalymma xanthopetalum F.Muell.
- Hypolaena grandiuscula F.Muell.
- Hypserpa laurina (F.Muell.) Diels
- Hypsophila halleyana F.Muell.

== I ==
- Ilex arnhemensis (F.Muell.) Loes.
- Indigofera baileyi F.Muell.
- Indigofera efoliata F.Muell.
- Indigofera haplophylla F.Muell.
- Indigofera pratensis F.Muell.
- Indigofera saxicola F.Muell. ex Benth.
- Indigofera schultziana F.Muell.
- Ipomoea calobra F.Muell.
- Ipomoea racemigera F.Muell. & Tate
- Isoetes elatior F.Muell. ex A.Braun
- Isoetes humilior F.Muell. ex A.Braun
- Isoglossa eranthemoides (F.Muell.) R.M.Barker
- Isopogon crithmifolius F.Muell.
- Isopogon dawsonii F.Muell. ex R.T.Baker
- Isopogon fletcheri F.Muell.
- Isopogon tridens (Meisn.) F.Muell.
- Isotoma fluviatilis (R.Br.) F.Muell. ex Benth.
- Isotoma gulliveri F.Muell.
- Isotoma petraea F.Muell.
- Isotropis atropurpurea F.Muell.
- Isotropis canescens F.Muell.
- Isotropis forrestii F.Muell.
- Isotropis winneckei F.Muell.
- Ixiolaena brevicompta F.Muell.
- Ixiolaena supina F.Muell.

== J ==
- Jacksonia forrestii F.Muell.
- Jacksonia nematoclada F.Muell.
- Jacksonia odontoclada F.Muell. ex Benth.
- Jacksonia rhadinoclada F.Muell.
- Jacksonia stackhousei F.Muell.
- Jasminum calcareum F.Muell.
- Jasminum dallachii F.Muell.
- Josephinia eugeniae F.Muell.
- Juncus homalocaulis F.Muell. ex Benth.

== K ==
- Kailarsenia jardinei (F.Muell. ex Benth.) Puttock
- Kailarsenia ochreata (F.Muell.) Puttock
- Kennedia beckxiana F.Muell.
- Kennedia prorepens (F.Muell.) F.Muell.
- Keraudrenia adenolasia (F.Muell.) F.M.Bailey
- Keraudrenia hillii F.Muell. ex Benth.
- Keraudrenia nephrosperma (F.Muell.) F.Muell.
- Kippistia suaedifolia F.Muell.
- Kuntheria pedunculata (F.Muell.) Conran & Clifford
- Kunzea calida F.Muell.
- Kunzea eriocalyx F.Muell.
- Kunzea opposita F.Muell.
- Kunzea pomifera F.Muell.

== L ==
- Labichea buettneriana F.Muell.
- Lachnostachys eriobotrya (F.Muell.) Druce
- Lachnostachys verbascifolia F.Muell.
- Lampranthus tegens (F.Muell.) N.E.Br.
- Lasiopetalum behrii F.Muell.
- Lasiopetalum fitzgibbonii F.Muell.
- Lasiopetalum maxwellii F.Muell.
- Lasiopetalum membraniflorum F.Muell.
- Lasiopetalum ogilvieanum F.Muell.
- Lasiopetalum oldfieldii F.Muell.
- Lasiopetalum oppositifolium F.Muell.
- Lasiopetalum parvuliflorum F.Muell.
- Lasiopetalum schulzenii (F.Muell.) Benth.
- Lasiopetalum x tepperi F.Muell.
- Lastreopsis marginans (F.Muell.) Tindale
- Lawrencella davenportii (F.Muell.) Paul G.Wilson
- Lawrencia berthae (F.Muell.) Melville
- Lawrencia helmsii (F.Muell. & Tate) Lander
- Laxmannia brachyphylla F.Muell.
- Laxmannia paleacea F.Muell.
- Lechenaultia chlorantha F.Muell.
- Lechenaultia divaricata F.Muell.
- Lechenaultia hirsuta F.Muell.
- Lechenaultia longiloba F.Muell.
- Lechenaultia striata F.Muell.
- Lechenaultia superba F.Muell.
- Legnephora moorei (F.Muell.) Miers
- Leiocarpa brevicompta (F.Muell.) Paul G.Wilson
- Leiocarpa semicalva (F.Muell.) Paul G.Wilson
- Leiocarpa supina (F.Muell.) Paul G.Wilson
- Leionema (F.Muell.) Paul G.Wilson
- Leionema ambiens (F.Muell.) Paul G.Wilson
- Leionema carruthersii (F.Muell.) Paul G.Wilson
- Leionema coxii (F.Muell.) Paul G.Wilson
- Leionema elatius (F.Muell.) Paul G.Wilson
- Leionema lamprophyllum (F.Muell.) Paul G.Wilson
- Leionema microphyllum (F.Muell.) Paul G.Wilson
- Leionema oldfieldii (F.Muell.) Paul G.Wilson
- Leionema phylicifolium (F.Muell.) Paul G.Wilson
- Leionema ralstonii (F.Muell.) Paul G.Wilson
- Lepiderema punctulata (F.Muell.) Radlk.
- Lepidium leptopetalum (F.Muell.) F.Muell.
- Lepidium merrallii F.Muell.
- Lepidium monoplocoides F.Muell.
- Lepidium papillosum F.Muell.
- Lepidium pedicellosum F.Muell.
- Lepidium phlebopetalum (F.Muell.) F.Muell.
- Lepidium pholidogynum F.Muell.
- Lepidorrhachis mooreana (F.Muell.) C.D.K.Cook
- Lepidosperma carphoides F.Muell. ex Benth.
- Lepidosperma resinosum (Lehm.) F.Muell. ex Benth.
- Lepidosperma tortuosum F.Muell.
- Lepilaena preissii (Lehm.) F.Muell.
- Lepistemon urceolatum (R.Br.) F.Muell.
- Leptorhynchos baileyi F.Muell.
- Leptorhynchos tenuifolius F.Muell.
- Leptosema chambersii F.Muell.
- Leptosema oxylobioides F.Muell.
- Leptospermum brachyandrum (F.Muell.) Druce
- Leptospermum brevipes F.Muell.
- Leptospermum laevigatum (Gaertn.) F.Muell.
- Lepyrodia anarthria F.Muell.
- Lepyrodia glauca (Nees) F.Muell.
- Lepyrodia monoica F.Muell.
- Lepyrodia muirii F.Muell.
- Leucochrysum fitzgibbonii (F.Muell.) Paul G.Wilson
- Leucochrysum stipitatum (F.Muell.) Paul G.Wilson
- Leucopogon allittii F.Muell.
- Leucopogon blepharolepis (F.Muell.) Benth.
- Leucopogon bossiaea (F.Muell.) Benth.
- Leucopogon breviflorus F.Muell.
- Leucopogon concurvus F.Muell.
- Leucopogon costatus (F.Muell.) J.M.Black
- Leucopogon crassiflorus (F.Muell.) Benth.
- Leucopogon exolasius (F.Muell.) Benth.
- Leucopogon gelidus (F.Muell. ex Benth.) N.A.Wakef.
- Leucopogon maccraei F.Muell.
- Leucopogon milliganii (F.Muell.) Rodway
- Leucopogon neoanglicus F.Muell. ex Benth.
- Leucopogon neurophyllus F.Muell.
- Leucopogon neurophyllus F.Muell.
- Leucopogon opponens (F.Muell.) Benth.
- Leucopogon pleiospermus (F.Muell.) Benth.
- Leucopogon pleurandroides F.Muell.
- Leucopogon plumuliflorus (F.Muell.) Benth.
- Leucopogon pluriloculatus F.Muell.
- Leucopogon rubicundus F.Muell.
- Leucopogon strongylophyllus F.Muell.
- Leucopogon stuartii F.Muell. ex Sond.
- Leucopogon woodsii F.Muell.
- Levenhookia preissii F.Muell.
- Levenhookia sonderi (F.Muell.) F.Muell.
- Levieria acuminata (F.Muell.) Perkins
- Licuala ramsayi (F.Muell.) Domin
- Limosella curdieana F.Muell.
- Lindernia clausa (F.Muell.) F.Muell.
- Lindernia crustacea (L.) F.Muell.
- Lindernia lobelioides (F.Muell.) F.Muell.
- Lindernia macrosiphonia (F.Muell.) W.R.Barker
- Lindernia plantaginea (F.Muell.) F.Muell.
- Lindernia pubescens (Benth.) F.Muell.
- Linospadix minor (W.Hill) F.Muell.
- Liparis angustilabris (F.Muell.) Blaxell
- Liparis coelogynoides (F.Muell.) Benth.
- Liparis habenarina (F.Muell.) Benth.
- Lissanthe pluriloculata (F.Muell.) J.M.Powell, Crayn & E.A.Br.
- Lissanthe rubicunda (F.Muell.) J.M.Powell, Crayn & E.A.Br.
- Lithomyrtus hypoleuca F.Muell. ex N.Snow & Guymer
- Litsea bindoniana (F.Muell.) F.Muell.
- Litsea fawcettiana (F.Muell.) B.Hyland
- Litsea leefeana (F.Muell.) Merr.
- Litsea reticulata (Meisn.) F.Muell.
- Livistona alfredii F.Muell.
- Livistona drudei F.Muell.
- Livistona mariae F.Muell.
- Lobelia gelida F.Muell.
- Logania buxifolia F.Muell.
- Logania callosa F.Muell.
- Logania flaviflora F.Muell.
- Logania nuda F.Muell.
- Logania spermacocea F.Muell.
- Logania stenophylla F.Muell.
- Logania vaginalis (Labill.) F.Muell.
- Lomandra juncea (F.Muell.) Ewart
- Lomandra ordii (F.Muell.) Schltr.
- Lomandra sonderi (F.Muell.) Ewart
- Lomandra sororia (F.Muell. ex Benth.) Ewart
- Lomatia fraxinifolia F.Muell. ex Benth.
- Lophostemon lactifluus (F.Muell.) Peter G.Wilson & J.T.Waterh.
- Loxocarya striata (F.Muell.) B.G.Briggs & L.A.S.Johnson
- Lycianthes shanesii (F.Muell.) A.R.Bean
- Lycium australe F.Muell.
- Lysiana murrayi (F.Muell. & Tate) Tiegh.
- Lysinema fimbriatum F.Muell.
- Lysiphyllum carronii (F.Muell.) Pedley
- Lysiphyllum hookeri (F.Muell.) Pedley

== M ==
- Macadamia ternifolia F.Muell.
- Macarthuria neocambrica F.Muell.
- Macgregoria racemigera F.Muell.
- Mackinlaya macrosciadea (F.Muell.) F.Muell.
- Macropteranthes fitzalanii F.Muell.
- Macropteranthes kekwickii F.Muell. ex Benth.
- Macropteranthes leichhardtii F.Muell. ex Benth.
- Macropteranthes montana (F.Muell.) F.Muell. ex Benth.
- Macrozamia diplomera (F.Muell.) L.A.S.Johnson
- Macrozamia dyeri (F.Muell.) C.A.Gardner
- Macrozamia macdonnellii (F.Muell. ex Miq.) A.DC.
- Macrozamia miquelii (F.Muell.) A.DC.
- Macrozamia moorei F.Muell.
- Macrozamia pauli-guilielmi W.Hill & F.Muell.
- Maesa dependens F.Muell.
- Maesa haplobotrys F.Muell.
- Maireana ciliata (F.Muell.) Paul G.Wilson
- Maireana dichoptera (F.Muell.) Paul G.Wilson
- Maireana enchylaenoides (F.Muell.) Paul G.Wilson
- Maireana eriantha (F.Muell.) Paul G.Wilson
- Maireana glomerifolia (F.Muell. & Tate) Paul G.Wilson
- Maireana humillima (F.Muell.) Paul G.Wilson
- Maireana luehmannii (F.Muell.) Paul G.Wilson
- Maireana melanocoma (F.Muell.) Paul G.Wilson
- Maireana oppositifolia (F.Muell.) Paul G.Wilson
- Maireana planifolia (F.Muell.) Paul G.Wilson
- Maireana prosthecochaeta (F.Muell.) Paul G.Wilson
- Maireana sedifolia (F.Muell.) Paul G.Wilson
- Maireana spongiocarpa (F.Muell.) Paul G.Wilson
- Mallotus claoxyloides (F.Muell.) Mull.Arg.
- Mallotus polyadenos F.Muell.
- Marianthus bicolor (Putt.) F.Muell.
- Marianthus bignoniaceus F.Muell.
- Marianthus ringens F.Muell.
- Marsdenia araujacea F.Muell.
- Marsdenia tubulosa F.Muell.
- Maundia triglochinoides F.Muell.
- Maytenus bilocularis (F.Muell.) Loes.
- Maytenus disperma (F.Muell.) Loes.
- Medicosma fareana (F.Muell.) T.G.Hartley
- Medinilla balls-headleyi F.Muell.
- Melaleuca acacioides F.Muell.
- Melaleuca acuminata F.Muell.
- Melaleuca bisulcata F.Muell.
- Melaleuca bracteata F.Muell.
- Melaleuca calothamnoides F.Muell.
- Melaleuca cardiophylla F.Muell.
- Melaleuca concreta F.Muell.
- Melaleuca deanei F.Muell.
- Melaleuca dissitiflora F.Muell.
- Melaleuca eleuterostachya F.Muell.
- Melaleuca filifolia F.Muell.
- Melaleuca glaberrima F.Muell.
- Melaleuca glaberrima F.Muell.
- Melaleuca glomerata F.Muell.
- Melaleuca lasiandra F.Muell.
- Melaleuca leiocarpa F.Muell.
- Melaleuca leiopyxis F.Muell. ex Benth.
- Melaleuca linophylla F.Muell.
- Melaleuca longistaminea (F.Muell.) Barlow ex Craven
- Melaleuca megacephala F.Muell.
- Melaleuca minutifolia F.Muell.
- Melaleuca nematophylla F.Muell. ex Craven
- Melaleuca nesophila F.Muell.
- Melaleuca oldfieldii F.Muell. ex Benth.
- Melaleuca pauperiflora F.Muell.
- Melaleuca quadrifaria F.Muell.
- Melaleuca symphyocarpa F.Muell.
- Melaleuca urceolaris F.Muell. ex Benth.
- Melaleuca wilsonii F.Muell.
- Melanostachya ustulata (F.Muell. ex Ewart & Sharman) B.G.Briggs & L.A.S.Johnson
- Melhania oblongifolia F.Muell.
- Melicope bonwickii (F.Muell.) T.G.Hartley
- Melicope contermina C.Moore & F.Muell.
- Melicope elleryana (F.Muell.) T.G.Hartley
- Melicope micrococca (F.Muell.) T.G.Hartley
- Melicope polybotrya (C.Moore & F.Muell.) T.G.Hartley
- Melicope vitiflora (F.Muell.) T.G.Hartley
- Melicope xanthoxyloides (F.Muell.) T.G.Hartley
- Melodinus acutiflorus F.Muell.
- Melodinus australis (F.Muell.) Pierre
- Melodinus baccellianus (F.Muell.) S.T.Blake
- Melodinus guilfoylei F.Muell.
- Melodorum uhrii F.Muell.
- Menkea sphaerocarpa F.Muell.
- Menkea villosula (F.Muell. & Tate) J.M.Black
- Merremia davenportii (F.Muell.) Hallier f.
- Mesua larnachiana (F.Muell.) Kosterm.
- Metrosideros nervulosa C.Moore & F.Muell.
- Metrosideros tetrapetala F.Muell.
- Micraira subulifolia F.Muell.
- Micrantheum demissum F.Muell.
- Microcorys lenticularis F.Muell.
- Microcorys loganiacea F.Muell.
- Microcorys longiflora F.Muell.
- Microcorys macredieana F.Muell.
- Microcorys pimeloides F.Muell.
- Microlepidium pilosulum F.Muell.
- Micromyrtus elobata (F.Muell.) Benth.
- Micromyrtus flaviflora (F.Muell.) J.M.Black
- Micromyrtus helmsii (F.Muell. & Tate) J.W.Green
- Micromyrtus hymenonema (F.Muell.) C.A.Gardner
- Micromyrtus leptocalyx (F.Muell.) Benth.
- Micromyrtus stenocalyx (F.Muell.) J.W.Green
- Miliusa brahei (F.Muell.) Jessup
- Milligania johnstonii F.Muell. ex Benth.
- Millotia greevesii F.Muell.
- Mimulus debilis F.Muell.
- Mirbelia aotoides F.Muell.
- Mirbelia oxylobioides F.Muell.
- Mirbelia seorsifolia (F.Muell.) C.A.Gardner
- Mischocarpus anodontus (F.Muell.) Radlk.
- Mischocarpus exangulatus (F.Muell.) Radlk.
- Mischocarpus grandissimus (F.Muell.) Radlk.
- Mischocarpus lachnocarpus (F.Muell.) Radlk.
- Mischocarpus pyriformis (F.Muell.) Radlk.
- Mitrasacme exserta F.Muell.
- Mitrasacme gentianea F.Muell.
- Mitrasacme lutea F.Muell.
- Mitrasacme subvolubilis F.Muell.
- Mollugo molluginis (F.Muell.) Druce
- Monochoria cyanea (F.Muell.) F.Muell.
- Monococcus echinophorus F.Muell.
- Monotaxis luteiflora F.Muell.
- Monotoca oligarrhenoides F.Muell.
- Monotoca tamariscina F.Muell.
- Moonia ecliptoides (F.Muell.) Benth.
- Morinda acutifolia F.Muell.
- Morinda hypotephra F.Muell.
- Motherwellia haplosciadea F.Muell.
- Muehlenbeckia diclina (F.Muell.) F.Muell.
- Muehlenbeckia diclina (F.Muell.) F.Muell.
- Muelleranthus trifoliolatus (F.Muell.) A.T.Lee
- Muiriantha hassellii (F.Muell.) C.A.Gardner
- Mukia micrantha (F.Muell.) F.Muell.
- Musa banksii F.Muell.
- Musa fitzalanii F.Muell.
- Musgravea stenostachya F.Muell.
- Myoporum bateae F.Muell.
- Myoporum beckeri (F.Muell.) Benth.
- Myoporum cordifolium (F.Muell.) Druce
- Myosotis exarrhena F.Muell.
- Myosurus australis F.Muell.
- Myriocephalus guerinae F.Muell.
- Myriocephalus oldfieldii (F.Muell.) Paul G.Wilson
- Myriocephalus rudallii (F.Muell.) Benth.
- Myriophyllum dicoccum F.Muell.
- Myriophyllum latifolium F.Muell.
- Myriophyllum trachycarpum F.Muell.

== N ==
- Negria rhabdothamnoides F.Muell.
- Neisosperma kilneri (F.Muell.) Fosberg & Sachet
- Nematolepis ovatifolia (F.Muell.) Paul G.Wilson
- Neoalsomitra capricornica (F.Muell.) Hutch.
- Neoalsomitra stephensiana (F.Muell.) Hutch.
- Neoalsomitra trifoliolata (F.Muell.) Hutch.
- Neobassia astrocarpa (F.Muell.) A.J.Scott
- Neobassia proceriflora (F.Muell.) A.J.Scott
- Neoroepera buxifolia Mull.Arg. & F.Muell.
- Neosepicaea jucunda (F.Muell.) Steenis
- Neotysonia phyllostegia (F.Muell.) Paul G.Wilson
- Neptunia monosperma F.Muell. ex Benth.
- Nervilia holochila (F.Muell.) Schltr.
- Nervilia holochila (F.Muell.) Schltr.
- Nervilia uniflora (F.Muell.) Schltr.
- Nervilia uniflora (F.Muell.) Schltr.
- Nesaea arnhemica (F.Muell.) F.Muell. ex Koehne
- Nesaea crinipes (F.Muell.) Koehne
- Nesaea robertsii (F.Muell.) Koehne
- Neurachne munroi (F.Muell.) F.Muell.
- Newcastelia bracteosa F.Muell.
- Newcastelia cephalantha F.Muell.
- Newcastelia cladotricha F.Muell.
- Newcastelia hexarrhena F.Muell.
- Newcastelia spodiotricha F.Muell.
- Niemeyera antiloga (F.Muell.) T.D.Penn.
- Niemeyera prunifera (F.Muell.) F.Muell.
- Notelaea venosa F.Muell.
- Nothofagus moorei (F.Muell.) Krasser
- Nymphoides crenata (F.Muell.) Kuntze
- Nymphoides exigua (F.Muell.) Kuntze
- Nymphoides exiliflora (F.Muell.) Kuntze
- Nymphoides minima (F.Muell.) Kuntze

== O ==
- Ochrosia glomerata (Blume) F.Muell.
- Ochrosia moorei (F.Muell.) F.Muell. ex Benth.
- Ochrosia sect. Echinocaryon F.Muell.
- Olearia adenolasia (F.Muell.) Benth.
- Olearia adenophora (F.Muell.) Benth.
- Olearia alpicola (F.Muell.) Benth.
- Olearia argophylla (Labill.) F.Muell. ex Benth.
- Olearia asterotricha (F.Muell.) Benth.
- Olearia ballii (F.Muell.) Hemsl.
- Olearia cassiniae (F.Muell.) Benth.
- Olearia exiguifolia (F.Muell.) Benth.
- Olearia ferresii (F.Muell.) Benth.
- Olearia frostii (F.Muell.) J.H.Willis
- Olearia gravis (F.Muell.) Benth.
- Olearia homolepis (F.Muell.) Benth.
- Olearia iodochroa (F.Muell.) Benth.
- Olearia magniflora (F.Muell.) Benth.
- Olearia megalophylla (F.Muell.) Benth.
- Olearia mooneyi (F.Muell.) Hemsl.
- Olearia nernstii (F.Muell.) Benth.
- Olearia oliganthema F.Muell. ex Benth.
- Olearia picridifolia (F.Muell.) Benth.
- Olearia rudis (Benth.) F.Muell. ex Benth.
- Olearia stuartii (F.Muell.) F.Muell. ex Benth.
- Olearia viscidula (F.Muell.) Benth.
- Olearia xerophila (F.Muell.) Benth.
- Omalanthus stillingiifolius F.Muell.
- Omphalolappula concava (F.Muell.) Brand
- Oncinocalyx betchei F.Muell.
- Oncophyllum minutissimum (F.Muell.) D.L.Jones & M.A.Clem.
- Opercularia liberiflora F.Muell.
- Oreobolus distichus F.Muell.
- Oreocallis wickhamii (W.Hill ex F.Muell.) Sleumer
- Oreomyrrhis pulvinifica F.Muell.
- Orites lancifolius F.Muell.
- Ormosia ormondii (F.Muell.) Merr.
- Osbornia octodonta F.Muell.
- Oschatzia cuneifolia (F.Muell.) Drude
- Osteocarpum acropterum (F.Muell. & Tate) Volkens
- Osteocarpum dipterocarpum (F.Muell.) Volkens
- Osteocarpum pentapterum (F.Muell. & Tate) Volkens
- Osteocarpum salsuginosum F.Muell.
- Osteocarpum scleropterum (F.Muell.) Volkens
- Owenia acidula F.Muell.
- Owenia cepiodora F.Muell.
- Owenia reticulata F.Muell.
- Owenia venosa F.Muell.
- Owenia vernicosa F.Muell.
- Oxychloris scariosa (F.Muell.) Lazarides
- Oxylobium alpestre F.Muell.
- Oxylobium procumbens F.Muell.
- Oxysepala shepherdii (F.Muell.) D.L.Jones & M.A.Clem.
- Ozothamnus decurrens F.Muell.
- Ozothamnus diotophyllus (F.Muell.) Anderb.
- Ozothamnus kempei (F.Muell.) Anderb.
- Ozothamnus pholidotus F.Muell.
- Ozothamnus retusus F.Muell.
- Ozothamnus scaber F.Muell.
- Ozothamnus selaginoides Sond. & F.Muell.
- Ozothamnus stirlingii (F.Muell.) Anderb.

== P ==
- Pachycornia triandra (F.Muell.) J.M.Black
- Pachymitus cardaminoides (F.Muell.) O.E.Schulz
- Pachynema sphenandrum F.Muell. & Tate
- Palaquium galactoxylum (F.Muell.) H.J.Lam
- Palmeria hypotephra (F.Muell.) Domin
- Palmeria scandens F.Muell.
- Pandanus aquaticus F.Muell.
- Pandanus aquaticus F.Muell.
- Pandanus forsteri F.Muell.
- Pandanus monticola F.Muell.
- Pandanus solms-laubachii F.Muell.
- Paphia helenae (F.Muell.) Schltr.
- Paphia meiniana (F.Muell.) Schltr.
- Paraceterach reynoldsii (F.Muell.) Tindale
- Paractaenum refractum (F.Muell.) R.D.Webster
- Parahebe decorosa (F.Muell.) B.G.Briggs & Ehrend.
- Parantennaria uniceps (F.Muell.) Beauverd
- Parsonsia diaphanophleba F.Muell.
- Parsonsia eucalyptophylla F.Muell.
- Parsonsia induplicata F.Muell.
- Parsonsia langiana F.Muell.
- Parsonsia largiflorens (F.Muell. ex Benth.) S.T.Blake
- Parsonsia leichhardtii F.Muell.
- Parsonsia lilacina F.Muell.
- Parsonsia straminea (R.Br.) F.Muell.
- Parsonsia ventricosa F.Muell.
- Patersonia drummondii F.Muell. ex Benth.
- Patersonia maxwellii (F.Muell.) F.Muell. ex Benth.
- Pembertonia latisquamea (F.Muell.) P.S.Short
- Pennisetum arnhemicum F.Muell.
- Pentaceras australe (F.Muell.) Benth.
- Pentaptilon careyi (F.Muell.) E.Pritz.
- Peristeranthus hillii (F.Muell.) T.E.Hunt
- Perrottetia arborescens (F.Muell.) Loes.
- Persoonia acicularis F.Muell.
- Persoonia arborea F.Muell.
- Persoonia brachystylis F.Muell.
- Petalostigma quadriloculare F.Muell.
- Petalostylis cassioides (F.Muell.) Symon
- Petermannia cirrosa F.Muell.
- Petrophile megalostegia F.Muell.
- Petrophile multisecta F.Muell.
- Petrophile semifurcata F.Muell. ex Benth.
- Phacellothrix cladochaeta (F.Muell.) F.Muell.
- Phaius australis F.Muell.
- Phaleria clerodendron (F.Muell.) Benth.
- Phebalium canaliculatum (F.Muell. & Tate) J.H.Willis
- Phebalium nottii (F.Muell.) Maiden & Betche
- Phebalium tuberculosum (F.Muell.) Benth.
- Pherosphaera fitzgeraldii (F.Muell.) F.Muell. ex Hook.f.
- Philotheca brucei (F.Muell.) Paul G.Wilson
- Philotheca trachyphylla (F.Muell.) Paul G.Wilson
- Phlebocarya filifolia (F.Muell.) Benth.
- Phlebocarya pilosissima (F.Muell.) Benth.
- Phlegmatospermum cochlearinum (F.Muell.) O.E.Schulz
- Phlegmatospermum richardsii (F.Muell.) E.A.Shaw
- Phyllangium distylis (F.Muell.) Dunlop
- Phyllanthus clamboides (F.Muell.) Diels
- Phyllanthus fuernrohrii F.Muell.
- Phyllanthus hirtellus F.Muell. ex Mull.Arg.
- Phyllanthus hypospodius F.Muell.
- Phyllanthus lacunarius F.Muell.
- Phyllanthus saxosus F.Muell.
- Phyllanthus subcrenulatus F.Muell.
- Phyllota diffusa (Hook.f.) F.Muell.
- Phyllota luehmannii F.Muell.
- Phyllota pleurandroides F.Muell.
- Phymatocarpus maxwellii F.Muell.
- Phymatocarpus porphyrocephalus F.Muell.
- Physopsis chrysotricha (F.Muell.) Rye
- Pileanthus vernicosus F.Muell.
- Pilidiostigma rhytispermum (F.Muell.) Burret
- Pimelea aeruginosa F.Muell.
- Pimelea ammocharis F.Muell.
- Pimelea congesta C.Moore & F.Muell.
- Pimelea forrestiana F.Muell.
- Pimelea haematostachya F.Muell.
- Pimelea holroydii F.Muell.
- Pimelea leptospermoides F.Muell.
- Pimelea penicillaris F.Muell.
- Pimelea petrophila F.Muell.
- Pimelea treyvaudii F.Muell. ex Ewart & B.Rees
- Piper triandrum F.Muell.
- Pittosporum erioloma C.Moore & F.Muell.
- Pittosporum spinescens (F.Muell.) L.Cayzer, Crisp & I.Telford
- Pittosporum venulosum F.Muell.
- Pittosporum wingii F.Muell.
- Pityrodia atriplicina (F.Muell.) Benth.
- Pityrodia chrysocalyx (F.Muell.) C.A.Gardner
- Pityrodia dilatata (F.Muell.) Benth.
- Pityrodia hemigenioides (F.Muell.) Benth.
- Pityrodia lepidota (F.Muell.) E.Pritz.
- Pityrodia loricata (F.Muell.) E.Pritz.
- Pityrodia loxocarpa (F.Muell.) Druce
- Pityrodia oldfieldii (F.Muell.) Benth.
- Pityrodia paniculata (F.Muell.) Benth.
- Pityrodia teckiana (F.Muell.) E.Pritz.
- Pityrodia ternifolia (F.Muell.) Munir
- Pityrodia verbascina (F.Muell.) Benth.
- Plagiobothrys plurisepaleus (F.Muell.) I.M.Johnst.
- Planchonella arnhemica (F.Muell. ex Benth.) P.Royen
- Planchonella chartacea (F.Muell. ex Benth.) H.J.Lam
- Planchonella euphlebia (F.Muell.) W.D.Francis
- Planchonella myrsinifolia (F.Muell.) Swenson, Bartish & Munzinger
- Planchonella myrsinifolia subsp. howeana (F.Muell.) Jessup
- Planchonella myrsinodendron (F.Muell.) Swenson, Bartish & Munzinger
- Planchonella pohlmaniana (F.Muell.) Pierre ex Dubard
- Planchonella xerocarpa (F.Muell. ex Benth.) H.J.Lam
- Planchonia careya (F.Muell.) R.Knuth
- Platylobium alternifolium F.Muell.
- Platysace eatoniae (F.Muell.) C.Norman
- Platysace maxwellii (F.Muell.) C.Norman
- Platysace valida (F.Muell.) F.Muell.
- Plectorrhiza brevilabris (F.Muell.) Dockrill
- Plectrachne danthonioides (F.Muell.) C.E.Hubb.
- Pleioluma brownlessiana (F.Muell.) Swenson & Munzinger
- Pleioluma xerocarpa (F.Muell. ex Benth.) Swenson
- Pleuropappus phyllocalymmeus F.Muell.
- Pluchea baccharioides (F.Muell.) Benth.
- Pluchea rubelliflora (F.Muell.) B.L.Rob.
- Pluchea tetranthera F.Muell.
- Poa fordeana F.Muell.
- Podocarpus drouynianus F.Muell.
- Podolepis hieracioides F.Muell.
- Podolepis kendallii (F.Muell.) F.Muell.
- Podolepis tepperi (F.Muell.) D.A.Cooke
- Podolobium aciculiferum F.Muell.
- Podotheca pollackii (F.Muell.) Diels
- Polyalthia armitiana F.Muell.
- Polycalymma stuartii F.Muell. & Sond.
- Polycarpaea breviflora F.Muell.
- Polycarpaea involucrata F.Muell.
- Polycarpaea longiflora F.Muell.
- Polycarpaea spirostylis F.Muell.
- Polycarpaea staminodina F.Muell.
- Polygala tepperi F.Muell.
- Polymeria angusta F.Muell.
- Polyosma alangiacea F.Muell.
- Polyosma reducta F.Muell.
- Polyscias australiana (F.Muell.) Philipson
- Polyscias cissodendron (C.Moore & F.Muell.) Harms
- Polyscias elegans (C.Moore & F.Muell.) Harms
- Polyscias murrayi (F.Muell.) Harms
- Polyscias willmottii (F.Muell.) Philipson
- Pomaderris elachophylla F.Muell.
- Pomaderris flabellaris (F.Muell. ex Reissek) J.M.Black
- Pomaderris forrestiana F.Muell.
- Pomaderris grandis F.Muell.
- Pomaderris intangenda F.Muell. ex F.Muell.
- Pomaderris paniculosa F.Muell. ex Reissek
- Pomaderris rotundifolia (F.Muell.) Rye
- Pomatocalpa macphersonii (F.Muell.) T.E.Hunt
- Porana sericea (Gaudich.) F.Muell.
- Portulaca bicolor F.Muell.
- Portulaca cyclophylla F.Muell.
- Portulaca digyna F.Muell.
- Portulaca filifolia F.Muell.
- Portulaca oligosperma F.Muell.
- Potamogeton tenuicaulis F.Muell.
- Prasophyllum frenchii F.Muell.
- Prasophyllum woollsii F.Muell.
- Pratia platycalyx (F.Muell.) Benth.
- Prosaptia fuscopilosa (F.Muell. & Baker) Parris
- Prostanthera calycina F.Muell. ex Benth.
- Prostanthera campbellii F.Muell.
- Prostanthera canaliculata F.Muell.
- Prostanthera chlorantha (F.Muell.) Benth.
- Prostanthera decussata F.Muell.
- Prostanthera eckersleyana F.Muell.
- Prostanthera eurybioides F.Muell.
- Prostanthera grylloana F.Muell.
- Prostanthera lithospermoides F.Muell.
- Prostanthera melissifolia F.Muell.
- Prostanthera phylicifolia F.Muell.
- Prostanthera spinosa F.Muell.
- Prostanthera staurophylla F.Muell.
- Prostanthera striatiflora F.Muell.
- Prostanthera walteri F.Muell.
- Prostanthera wilkieana F.Muell.
- Psammomoya choretroides (F.Muell.) Diels & Loes.
- Pseudanthus orientalis F.Muell.
- Pseudanthus ovalifolius F.Muell.
- Pseudoweinmannia lachnocarpa (F.Muell.) Engl.
- Pseuduvaria froggattii (F.Muell.) Jessup
- Psoralea testariae F.Muell.
- Psychotria carronis C.Moore & F.Muell.
- Psychotria nematopoda F.Muell.
- Psychotria nesophila F.Muell.
- Psydrax lamprophylla (F.Muell.) Bridson
- Psydrax lamprophylla (F.Muell.) Bridson f. lamprophylla
- Psydrax latifolia (F.Muell. ex Benth.) S.T.Reynolds
- Pterocaulon sphacelatum (Labill.) F.Muell.
- Pterocaulon sphaeranthoides (DC.) F.Muell.
- Pterocaulon verbascifolium (Benth.) F.Muell.
- Ptilotus aervoides (F.Muell.) F.Muell.
- Ptilotus arthrolasius F.Muell.
- Ptilotus astrolasius F.Muell.
- Ptilotus auriculifolius (Moq.) F.Muell.
- Ptilotus axillaris (Benth.) F.Muell.
- Ptilotus beckerianus (F.Muell.) F.Muell. ex J.M.Black
- Ptilotus brachyanthus (Benth.) F.Muell.
- Ptilotus caespitulosus F.Muell.
- Ptilotus calostachyus F.Muell.
- Ptilotus capitatus (F.Muell.) C.A.Gardner
- Ptilotus carlsonii F.Muell.
- Ptilotus dissitiflorus (F.Muell.) F.Muell.
- Ptilotus divaricatus (Gaudich.) F.Muell.
- Ptilotus drummondii (Moq.) F.Muell.
- Ptilotus esquamatus (Benth.) F.Muell.
- Ptilotus fraseri (Moq.) F.Muell.
- Ptilotus grandiflorus F.Muell.
- Ptilotus helichrysoides (F.Muell.) F.Muell.
- Ptilotus helipteroides (F.Muell.) F.Muell.
- Ptilotus holosericeus (Moq.) F.Muell.
- Ptilotus humilis (Nees) F.Muell.
- Ptilotus leucocomus (Moq.) F.Muell.
- Ptilotus manglesii (Lindl.) F.Muell.
- Ptilotus murrayi F.Muell.
- Ptilotus nobilis (Lindl.) F.Muell.
- Ptilotus obovatus (Gaudich.) F.Muell.
- Ptilotus parvifolius (F.Muell.) F.Muell.
- Ptilotus polakii F.Muell.
- Ptilotus polystachyus (Gaudich.) F.Muell.
- Ptilotus pyramidatus (Moq.) F.Muell.
- Ptilotus roei (Benth.) F.Muell.
- Ptilotus rotundifolius (F.Muell.) F.Muell.
- Ptilotus schwartzii (F.Muell.) Tate
- Ptilotus schwartzii (F.Muell.) Tate f. schwartzii
- Ptilotus sericostachyus (Nees) F.Muell.
- Ptilotus sericostachyus (Nees) F.Muell. f. sericostachyus
- Ptilotus stirlingii (Lindl.) F.Muell.
- Ptilotus villosiflorus F.Muell.
- Ptychosema anomalum F.Muell.
- Pullea stutzeri (F.Muell.) Gibbs
- Pultenaea altissima F.Muell. ex Benth.
- Pultenaea baeuerlenii F.Muell.
- Pultenaea benthamii F.Muell.
- Pultenaea canaliculata F.Muell.
- Pultenaea densifolia F.Muell.
- Pultenaea elachista (F.Muell.) Crisp
- Pultenaea hartmannii F.Muell.
- Pultenaea largiflorens F.Muell. ex Benth.
- Pultenaea pycnocephala F.Muell. ex Benth.
- Pultenaea skinneri F.Muell.
- Pultenaea subalpina (F.Muell.) Druce
- Pycnosorus pleiocephalus (F.Muell.) J.Everett & Doust
- Pyrorchis forrestii (F.Muell.) D.L.Jones & M.A.Clem.

== Q ==
- Quintinia fawkneri F.Muell.
- Quintinia quatrefagesii F.Muell.
- Quintinia verdonii F.Muell.

== R ==
- Radyera farragei (F.Muell.) Fryxell & S.H.Hashmi
- Randia benthamiana F.Muell.
- Randia moorei F.Muell. ex Benth.
- Ranunculus anemoneus F.Muell.
- Ranunculus millanii F.Muell.
- Rapanea achradifolia (F.Muell.) Mez
- Rapanea campanulata (F.Muell.) Mez
- Rapanea howittiana (F.Muell.) Mez
- Rapanea platystigma (F.Muell.) Mez
- Rapanea porosa (F.Muell.) Mez
- Rapanea subsessilis (F.Muell.) Mez
- Rauwenhoffia leichhardtii (F.Muell.) Diels
- Reedia spathacea F.Muell.
- Rhadinothamnus euphemiae (F.Muell.) Paul G.Wilson
- Rhaphidospora bonneyana (F.Muell.) R.M.Barker
- Rhaphidospora cavernarum (F.Muell.) R.M.Barker
- Rhodanthe battii (F.Muell.) Paul G.Wilson
- Rhodanthe charsleyae (F.Muell.) Paul G.Wilson
- Rhodanthe condensata (F.Muell.) Paul G.Wilson
- Rhodanthe forrestii (F.Muell.) Paul G.Wilson
- Rhodanthe frenchii (F.Muell.) Paul G.Wilson
- Rhodanthe haigii (F.Muell.) Paul G.Wilson
- Rhodanthe margarethae (F.Muell.) Paul G.Wilson
- Rhodanthe pollackii (F.Muell.) Paul G.Wilson
- Rhodanthe polyphylla (F.Muell.) Paul G.Wilson
- Rhodanthe sterilescens (F.Muell.) Paul G.Wilson
- Rhodanthe stuartiana (Sond. & F.Muell.) Paul G.Wilson
- Rhodanthe tietkensii (F.Muell.) Paul G.Wilson
- Rhodanthe troedelii (F.Muell.) Paul G.Wilson
- Rhododendron lochiae F.Muell.
- Rhodomyrtus trineura (F.Muell.) Benth.
- Rhodosphaera rhodanthema (F.Muell.) Engl.
- Rhynchosia rhomboidea F.Muell. ex Benth.
- Rhynchospora pterochaeta F.Muell.
- Rhysotoechia mortoniana (F.Muell.) Radlk.
- Rhysotoechia robertsonii (F.Muell.) Radlk.
- Rhytidosporum procumbens (Hook.) F.Muell.
- Richea acerosa (Lindl.) F.Muell.
- Richea milliganii (Hook.f.) F.Muell.
- Richea procera (F.Muell.) F.Muell.
- Richea sprengelioides (R.Br.) F.Muell.
- Ricinocarpos bowmanii F.Muell.
- Ricinocarpos ledifolius F.Muell.
- Ricinocarpos velutinus F.Muell.
- Ripogonum discolor F.Muell.
- Ripogonum elseyanum F.Muell.
- Ripogonum fawcettianum F.Muell. ex Benth.
- Rorippa eustylis (F.Muell.) L.A.S.Johnson
- Rorippa laciniata (F.Muell.) L.A.S.Johnson
- Rotala diandra F.Muell. ex Koehne
- Rourea brachyandra F.Muell.
- Rubus hillii F.Muell.
- Rubus moorei F.Muell.
- Rulingia craurophylla F.Muell.
- Rulingia loxophylla F.Muell.
- Rulingia magniflora F.Muell.
- Rutidosis leiolepis F.Muell.
- Rutidosis leptorrhynchoides F.Muell.
- Rutidosis leucantha F.Muell.
- Rutidosis murchisonii F.Muell.

== S ==
- Saccolabiopsis armitii (F.Muell.) Dockrill
- Sarcochilus ceciliae F.Muell.
- Sarcochilus dilatatus F.Muell.
- Sarcochilus fitzgeraldii F.Muell.
- Sarcochilus hartmannii F.Muell.
- Sarcochilus hillii (F.Muell.) F.Muell.
- Sarcopetalum harveyanum F.Muell.
- Sarcopteryx martyana (F.Muell.) Radlk.
- Sarcopteryx stipata (F.Muell.) Radlk.
- Sarcozona praecox (F.Muell.) S.T.Blake
- Sarga intrans (F.Muell.) Spangler
- Sarojusticia kempeana (F.Muell.) Bremek. ex H.Eichler
- Saurauia andreana F.Muell.
- Sauropus glaucus (F.Muell.) Airy Shaw
- Sauropus hirtellus (F.Muell.) Airy Shaw
- Sauropus ramosissimus (F.Muell.) Airy Shaw
- Sauropus rigens (F.Muell.) Airy Shaw
- Sauropus trachyspermus (F.Muell.) Airy Shaw
- Scaevola amblyanthera F.Muell.
- Scaevola brookeana F.Muell.
- Scaevola collaris F.Muell.
- Scaevola enantophylla F.Muell.
- Scaevola oldfieldii F.Muell.
- Scaevola oxyclona F.Muell.
- Scaevola parvifolia F.Muell. ex Benth.
- Scaevola phlebopetala F.Muell.
- Scaevola porocarya F.Muell.
- Scambopus curvipes (F.Muell.) O.E.Schulz
- Schistocarpaea johnsonii F.Muell.
- Schizeilema fragosea (F.Muell.) Domin
- Schoenia ayersii (F.Muell.) J.M.Black
- Schoenia macivorii (F.Muell.) Paul G.Wilson
- Schoenia ramosissima (F.Muell.) Paul G.Wilson
- Schoenus asperocarpus F.Muell.
- Schoenus benthamii F.Muell.
- Schoenus efoliatus F.Muell.
- Schoenus grammatophyllus F.Muell.
- Schoenus grandiflorus (Lehm.) F.Muell.
- Schoenus hexandrus F.Muell. & Tate
- Schoenus lepidosperma (F.Muell.) K.L.Wilson
- Schoenus minutulus F.Muell.
- Schoenus natans (F.Muell.) Benth.
- Schoenus odontocarpus F.Muell.
- Schoenus pleiostemoneus F.Muell.
- Schoenus trachycarpus F.Muell.
- Schoenus unispiculatus F.Muell. ex Benth.
- Schoenus vaginatus F.Muell. ex Benth.
- Scholtzia ciliata F.Muell.
- Scholtzia parviflora F.Muell.
- Scholtzia uberiflora F.Muell.
- Scholtzia umbellifera F.Muell.
- Scirpus polystachyus F.Muell.
- Scleranthus minusculus F.Muell.
- Scleranthus singuliflorus (F.Muell.) Mattf.
- Scleria sphacelata F.Muell.
- Scleroblitum atriplicinum (F.Muell.) Ulbr.
- Sclerolaena anisacanthoides (F.Muell.) Domin
- Sclerolaena bicuspis (F.Muell.) Domin
- Sclerolaena birchii (F.Muell.) Domin
- Sclerolaena brachyptera (F.Muell.) S.W.L.Jacobs
- Sclerolaena cornishiana (F.Muell.) A.J.Scott
- Sclerolaena eriacantha (F.Muell.) Ulbr.
- Sclerolaena eurotioides (F.Muell.) A.J.Scott
- Sclerolaena fimbriolata (F.Muell.) A.J.Scott
- Sclerolaena forrestiana (F.Muell.) Domin
- Sclerolaena glabra (F.Muell.) Domin
- Sclerolaena lanicuspis (F.Muell.) Benth.
- Sclerolaena longicuspis (F.Muell.) A.J.Scott
- Sclerolaena stelligera (F.Muell.) S.W.L.Jacobs
- Sclerolaena tatei (F.Muell.) A.J.Scott
- Sclerolaena tricuspis (F.Muell.) Ulbr.
- Sclerolaena tridens (F.Muell.) Domin
- Sebaea albidiflora F.Muell.
- Sedopsis armitii (F.Muell.) Poelln.
- Senecio albogilvus (F.Muell.) I.Thomps.
- Senecio amygdalifolius F.Muell.
- Senecio behrianus Sond. & F.Muell. ex Sond.
- Senecio daltonii F.Muell.
- Senecio garlandii F.Muell. ex Belcher
- Senecio gregorii F.Muell.
- Senecio helichrysoides F.Muell.
- Senecio hypoleucus F.Muell. ex Benth.
- Senecio laceratus (F.Muell.) Belcher
- Senecio leucoglossus F.Muell.
- Senecio macrocarpus F.Muell. ex Belcher
- Senecio magnificus F.Muell.
- Senecio megaglossus F.Muell.
- Senecio papillosus F.Muell.
- Senecio primulaefolius F.Muell.
- Senecio vagus F.Muell.
- Senna acclinis (F.Muell.) Randell
- Senna cardiosperma (F.Muell.) Randell
- Senna cuthbertsonii (F.Muell.) Randell
- Senna heptanthera (F.Muell.) Randell
- Senna magnifolia (F.Muell.) Randell
- Senna notabilis (F.Muell.) Randell
- Senna oligoclada (F.Muell.) Randell
- Senna pleurocarpa (F.Muell.) Randell
- Senna venusta (F.Muell.) Randell
- Sesbania brachycarpa F.Muell.
- Sesbania formosa (F.Muell.) N.T.Burb.
- Sesbania simpliciuscula F.Muell. ex Benth.
- Sida cardiophylla (Benth.) F.Muell.
- Sida cleisocalyx F.Muell.
- Sida cryphiopetala F.Muell.
- Sida echinocarpa F.Muell.
- Sida intricata F.Muell.
- Sida kingii F.Muell.
- Sida phaeotricha F.Muell.
- Sida physocalyx F.Muell.
- Sida spenceriana F.Muell.
- Sida trichopoda F.Muell.
- Sideroxylon richardii F.Muell. (synonym of Pleioluma laurifolia)
- Sloanea australis (Benth.) F.Muell.
- Sloanea langii F.Muell.
- Sloanea macbrydei F.Muell.
- Sloanea woollsii F.Muell.
- Solanum adenophorum F.Muell.
- Solanum carduiforme F.Muell.
- Solanum chenopodinum F.Muell.
- Solanum corifolium F.Muell.
- Solanum densevestitum F.Muell. ex Benth.
- Solanum diversiflorum F.Muell.
- Solanum elachophyllum F.Muell.
- Solanum eremophilum F.Muell.
- Solanum lacunarium F.Muell.
- Solanum lucani F.Muell.
- Solanum magnifolium F.Muell.
- Solanum melanospermum F.Muell.
- Solanum nemophilum F.Muell.
- Solanum oldfieldii F.Muell.
- Solanum oligacanthum F.Muell.
- Solanum petrophilum F.Muell.
- Solanum quadriloculatum F.Muell.
- Solanum semiarmatum F.Muell.
- Solanum shanesii F.Muell.
- Solanum simile F.Muell.
- Solanum sporadotrichum F.Muell.
- Solanum sturtianum F.Muell.
- Solanum tetrathecum F.Muell.
- Solanum vescum F.Muell.
- Sowerbaea alliacea F.Muell.
- Spartothamnella puberula (F.Muell.) Maiden & Betche
- Spartothamnella teucriiflora (F.Muell.) Moldenke
- Spathoglottis paulinae F.Muell.
- Spermacoce auriculata F.Muell.
- Spermacoce inaperta F.Muell.
- Spermacoce laevigata F.Muell.
- Spermacoce stenophylla F.Muell.
- Sphenostemon lobosporus (F.Muell.) L.S.Sm.
- Sphenotoma drummondii (Benth.) F.Muell.
- Sphenotoma parviflora (Benth.) F.Muell.
- Sporadanthus interruptus (F.Muell.) B.G.Briggs & L.A.S.Johnson
- Sporobolus actinocladus (F.Muell.) F.Muell.
- Spyridium bifidum (F.Muell.) Benth.
- Spyridium complicatum F.Muell.
- Spyridium halmaturinum (F.Muell.) Benth.
- Spyridium leucopogon F.Muell.
- Spyridium parvifolium (Hook.) F.Muell.
- Spyridium phlebophyllum (F.Muell.) F.Muell.
- Spyridium scortechinii (F.Muell.) K.R.Thiele
- Spyridium spathulatum (F.Muell.) Benth.
- Spyridium subochreatum (F.Muell.) Reissek
- Stachystemon nematophorus (F.Muell.) Halford & R.J.F.Hend.
- Stachystemon polyandrus (F.Muell.) Benth.
- Stackhousia megaloptera F.Muell.
- Stackhousia pulvinaris F.Muell.
- Stawellia dimorphantha F.Muell.
- Stemodia kingii F.Muell.
- Stemodia linophylla F.Muell.
- Stemodia lythrifolia F.Muell. ex Benth.
- Stenocarpus acacioides F.Muell.
- Stenopetalum nutans F.Muell.
- Stenopetalum sphaerocarpum F.Muell.
- Stenopetalum velutinum F.Muell.
- Sterculia holtzei F.Muell.
- Sterculia shillinglawii F.Muell.
- Strangea cynanchicarpa (Meisn.) F.Muell.
- Strangea stenocarpoides (F.Muell. ex Benth.) C.A.Gardner
- Streblus brunonianus (Endl.) F.Muell.
- Streblus pendulinus (Endl.) F.Muell.
- Streptoglossa macrocephala (F.Muell.) Dunlop
- Streptoglossa odora (F.Muell.) Dunlop
- Streptothamnus beckleri F.Muell.
- Streptothamnus moorei F.Muell.
- Strychnos psilosperma F.Muell.
- Stylidium barleei F.Muell.
- Stylidium crossocephalum F.Muell.
- Stylidium debile F.Muell.
- Stylidium dispermum F.Muell.
- Stylidium eglandulosum F.Muell.
- Stylidium fissilobum F.Muell.
- Stylidium floodii F.Muell.
- Stylidium leptorrhizum F.Muell.
- Stylidium limbatum F.Muell.
- Stylidium lobuliflorum F.Muell.
- Stylidium merrallii (F.Muell.) T.Durand & B.D.Jacks.
- Stylidium muscicola F.Muell.
- Stylidium pachyrrhizum F.Muell.
- Stylidium preissii (Sond.) F.Muell.
- Stylidium schizanthum F.Muell.
- Stylidium soboliferum F.Muell.
- Stylidium tenerrimum F.Muell.
- Stylidium tepperianum (F.Muell.) Mildbr.
- Stylidium verticillatum F.Muell.
- Styphelia exarrhena (F.Muell.) F.Muell.
- Styphelia exserta (F.Muell.) Sleumer
- Styphelia hainesii F.Muell.
- Styphelia melaleucoides F.Muell.
- Styphelia pulchella (Sond.) F.Muell.
- Swainsona beasleyana F.Muell.
- Swainsona behriana F.Muell. ex J.M.Black
- Swainsona burkei F.Muell. ex Benth.
- Swainsona burkittii F.Muell. ex Benth.
- Swainsona cadellii F.Muell. ex C.Moore & Betche
- Swainsona campylantha F.Muell.
- Swainsona canescens (Benth.) F.Muell.
- Swainsona colutoides F.Muell.
- Swainsona cyclocarpa F.Muell.
- Swainsona forrestii F.Muell. ex A.T.Lee
- Swainsona kingii F.Muell.
- Swainsona luteola F.Muell.
- Swainsona maccullochiana F.Muell.
- Swainsona oligophylla F.Muell. ex Benth.
- Swainsona oliveri F.Muell.
- Swainsona oroboides F.Muell. ex Benth.
- Swainsona plagiotropis F.Muell.
- Swainsona procumbens (F.Muell.) F.Muell.
- Swainsona stenodonta F.Muell.
- Swainsona stipularis F.Muell.
- Swainsona tephrotricha F.Muell.
- Swainsona unifoliolata F.Muell.
- Symonanthus bancroftii (F.Muell.) Haegi
- Symplocos stawellii F.Muell.
- Symplocos thwaitesii F.Muell.
- Synaptantha tillaeacea (F.Muell.) Hook.f.
- Synima cordieri (F.Muell.) Radlk.
- Syzygium angophoroides (F.Muell.) B.Hyland
- Syzygium apodophyllum (F.Muell.) B.Hyland
- Syzygium cormiflorum (F.Muell.) B.Hyland
- Syzygium corynanthum (F.Muell.) L.A.S.Johnson
- Syzygium eucalyptoides (F.Muell.) B.Hyland
- Syzygium forte (F.Muell.) B.Hyland
- Syzygium fullagarii (F.Muell.) Craven
- Syzygium hodgkinsoniae (F.Muell.) L.A.S.Johnson
- Syzygium johnsonii (F.Muell.) B.Hyland
- Syzygium luehmannii (F.Muell.) L.A.S.Johnson
- Syzygium minutuliflorum (F.Muell.) B.Hyland
- Syzygium moorei (F.Muell.) L.A.S.Johnson
- Syzygium oleosum (F.Muell.) B.Hyland
- Syzygium sayeri (F.Muell.) B.Hyland
- Syzygium tierneyanum (F.Muell.) T.G.Hartley & L.M.Perry
- Syzygium wilsonii (F.Muell.) B.Hyland

== T ==
- Tapeinosperma flueckigeri (F.Muell.) Mez
- Tapeinosperma pseudojambosa (F.Muell.) Mez
- Tarenna dallachiana (F.Muell. ex Benth.) S.Moore
- Tasmannia membranea (F.Muell.) A.C.Sm.
- Tecomanthe hillii (F.Muell.) Steenis
- Telopea oreades F.Muell.
- Templetonia aculeata (F.Muell.) Benth.
- Templetonia battii F.Muell.
- Templetonia egena (F.Muell.) Benth.
- Templetonia hookeri (F.Muell.) Benth.
- Templetonia stenophylla (F.Muell.) J.M.Black
- Tephrosia brachycarpa F.Muell. ex Benth.
- Tephrosia flammea F.Muell. ex Benth.
- Tephrosia forrestiana F.Muell.
- Tephrosia lamprolobioides F.Muell.
- Tephrosia nematophylla F.Muell.
- Tephrosia phaeosperma F.Muell. ex Benth.
- Tephrosia remotiflora F.Muell. ex Benth.
- Tephrosia rosea F.Muell. ex Benth.
- Tephrosia simplicifolia F.Muell. ex Benth.
- Tephrosia singuliflora F.Muell.
- Tephrosia sphaerospora F.Muell.
- Tephrosia uniovulata F.Muell.
- Teratophyllum brightiae (F.Muell.) Holttum
- Terminalia bursarina F.Muell.
- Terminalia erythrocarpa F.Muell.
- Terminalia melanocarpa F.Muell.
- Terminalia oblongata F.Muell.
- Terminalia platyphylla F.Muell.
- Terminalia platyptera F.Muell.
- Terminalia pterocarya F.Muell.
- Terminalia sericocarpa F.Muell.
- Tetracera daemeliana F.Muell.
- Tetracera nordtiana F.Muell.
- Tetragonia diptera F.Muell.
- Tetraria capillaris (F.Muell.) J.M.Black
- Tetrastigma nitens (F.Muell.) Planch.
- Tetratheca aphylla F.Muell.
- Tetratheca bauerifolia F.Muell. ex Schuch.
- Tetratheca efoliata F.Muell.
- Tetratheca harperi F.Muell.
- Teucrium ajugaceum F.M.Bailey & F.Muell. ex F.M.Bailey
- Teucrium grandiusculum F.Muell. & Tate
- Thecanthes concreta (F.Muell.) Rye
- Thecanthes sanguinea (F.Muell.) Rye
- Thelychiton gracilicaulis (F.Muell.) M.A.Clem. & D.L.Jones
- Thelychiton moorei (F.Muell.) M.A.Clem. & D.L.Jones
- Thelymitra epipactoides F.Muell.
- Thelymitra mackibbinii F.Muell.
- Thelymitra spiralis (Lindl.) F.Muell.
- Thelymitra variegata (Lindl.) F.Muell.
- Thelymitra x macmillanii F.Muell.
- Themeda avenacea (F.Muell.) Maiden & Betche
- Thespidium basiflorum (F.Muell.) F.Muell.
- Thiseltonia gracillima (F.Muell. & Tate) Paul G.Wilson
- Thismia rodwayi F.Muell.
- Thomasia petalocalyx F.Muell.
- Thomasia tenuivestita F.Muell.
- Thozetia racemosa F.Muell. ex Benth.
- Thryptomene baeckeacea F.Muell.
- Thryptomene denticulata (F.Muell.) Benth.
- Thryptomene elliottii F.Muell.
- Thryptomene ericaea F.Muell.
- Thryptomene johnsonii F.Muell.
- Thryptomene maisonneuvei F.Muell.
- Thryptomene oligandra F.Muell.
- Thryptomene urceolaris F.Muell.
- Thunbergia arnhemica F.Muell.
- Thynninorchis huntianus (F.Muell.) D.L.Jones & M.A.Clem.
- Thysanotus exiliflorus F.Muell.
- Timonius singularis (F.Muell.) L.S.Sm.
- Tinospora tinosporoides (F.Muell.) Forman
- Toechima daemelianum (F.Muell.) Radlk.
- Toechima erythrocarpum (F.Muell.) Radlk.
- Trachymene cyanopetala (F.Muell.) Benth.
- Trachymene didiscoides (F.Muell.) B.L.Burtt
- Trachymene elachocarpa (F.Muell.) B.L.Burtt
- Trachymene glandulosa (F.Muell.) Benth.
- Trachymene glaucifolia (F.Muell.) Benth.
- Trachymene procumbens (F.Muell.) Benth.
- Trachymene villosa (F.Muell.) Benth.
- Trachyrhizum agrostophyllum (F.Muell.) Rauschert
- Trianthema cussackiana F.Muell.
- Trianthema glossostigma F.Muell.
- Trianthema oxycalyptra F.Muell.
- Trianthema pilosa F.Muell.
- Trianthema rhynchocalyptra F.Muell.
- Trianthema turgidifolia F.Muell.
- Tribulopis bicolor F.Muell.
- Tribulus astrocarpus F.Muell.
- Tribulus forrestii F.Muell.
- Tribulus macrocarpus F.Muell. ex Benth.
- Tribulus ranunculiflorus F.Muell.
- Trichanthodium skirrophorum Sond. & F.Muell.
- Trichosanthes holtzei F.Muell.
- Trichosanthes subvelutina F.Muell. ex Cogn.
- Tricostularia pauciflora (F.Muell.) Benth.
- Triodia bromoides (F.Muell.) Lazarides
- Tripogon loliiformis (F.Muell.) C.E.Hubb.
- Tristaniopsis exiliflora (F.Muell.) Peter G.Wilson & J.T.Waterh.
- Triumfetta appendiculata F.Muell.
- Triumfetta bradshawii F.Muell.
- Triumfetta chaetocarpa F.Muell.
- Triumfetta johnstonii F.Muell.
- Triumfetta leptacantha F.Muell.
- Triumfetta micracantha F.Muell.
- Triumfetta plumigera F.Muell.
- Triumfetta winneckeana F.Muell.
- Triunia youngiana (C.Moore & F.Muell.) L.A.S.Johnson & B.G.Briggs
- Trochocarpa clarkei (F.Muell.) F.Muell.
- Trymalium daltonii F.Muell.
- Trymalium flabellare F.Muell. ex Reissek
- Trymalium urceolare (F.Muell.) Diels
- Tylophora biglandulosa (Endl.) F.Muell.
- Typhonium alismifolium F.Muell.
- Typhonium angustilobum F.Muell.
- Typhonium liliifolium F.Muell.

== U ==
- Uncinia debilior F.Muell.
- Urena armitiana F.Muell.
- Utricularia capilliflora F.Muell.
- Utricularia fulva F.Muell.
- Utricularia holtzei F.Muell.
- Utricularia kamienskii F.Muell.
- Utricularia lasiocaulis F.Muell.
- Utricularia leptoplectra F.Muell.
- Utricularia quinquedentata F.Muell. ex P.Taylor
- Utricularia singeriana F.Muell.
- Utricularia tubulata F.Muell.
- Uvaria holtzei F.Muell.

== V ==
- Velleia connata F.Muell.
- Velleia cycnopotamica F.Muell.
- Velleia daviesii F.Muell.
- Velleia discophora F.Muell.
- Velleia exigua (F.Muell.) Carolin
- Ventilago ecorollata F.Muell.
- Verbena macrostachya F.Muell.
- Veronica hillebrandii F.Muell.
- Veronica notabilis F.Muell. ex Benth.
- Verticordia forrestii F.Muell.
- Verticordia helichrysantha F.Muell. ex Benth.
- Verticordia hughanii F.Muell.
- Verticordia jamiesonii F.Muell.
- Verticordia lepidophylla F.Muell.
- Verticordia minutiflora F.Muell.
- Verticordia penicillaris F.Muell.
- Verticordia pholidophylla F.Muell.
- Verticordia rennieana F.Muell. & Tate
- Verticordia spicata F.Muell.
- Verticordia verticordina (F.Muell.) A.S.George
- Vesselowskya rubifolia (F.Muell.) Pamp.
- Villarsia albiflora F.Muell.
- Villarsia calthifolia F.Muell.
- Villarsia congestiflora F.Muell.
- Villarsia lasiosperma F.Muell.
- Villarsia violifolia F.Muell.
- Vitex melicopea F.Muell.
- Vittadinia hispidula F.Muell. ex A.Gray

== W ==
- Waterhousea floribunda (F.Muell.) B.Hyland
- Waterhousea hedraiophylla (F.Muell.) B.Hyland
- Wedelia spilanthoides F.Muell.
- Wehlia coarctata F.Muell.
- Wehlia staminosa F.Muell.
- Wehlia thryptomenoides F.Muell.
- Welchiodendron longivalve (F.Muell.) Peter G.Wilson & J.T.Waterh.
- Wendlandia basistaminea F.Muell.
- Wendlandia psychotrioides (F.Muell.) F.Muell.
- Westringia cephalantha F.Muell.
- Westringia senifolia F.Muell.
- Whiteochloa semitonsa (F.Muell. ex Benth.) C.E.Hubb.
- Wilkiea wardellii (F.Muell.) Perkins
- Wittsteinia vacciniacea F.Muell.
- Woollsia pungens (Cav.) F.Muell.
- Wrightia saligna (R.Br.) F.Muell. ex Benth.
- Wrixonia prostantheroides F.Muell.
- Wurmbea dioica (R.Br.) F.Muell.

== X ==
- Xanthophyllum octandrum (F.Muell.) Domin
- Xanthorrhoea macronema F.Muell. ex Benth.
- Xanthorrhoea quadrangulata F.Muell.
- Xanthorrhoea semiplana F.Muell.
- Xanthosia atkinsoniana F.Muell.
- Xanthosia leiophylla F.Muell. ex Klatt
- Xanthosia singuliflora F.Muell.
- Xanthostemon chrysanthus (F.Muell.) Benth.
- Xanthostemon eucalyptoides F.Muell.
- Xanthostemon paradoxus F.Muell.
- Xylomelum scottianum (F.Muell.) F.Muell.
- Xylopia maccreai (F.Muell.) L.S.Sm.
- Xyris gracillima F.Muell.
- Xyris laxiflora F.Muell.

== Z ==
- Zanthoxylum brachyacanthum F.Muell.
- Zehneria cunninghamii F.Muell.
- Zeuxine polygonoides (F.Muell.) P.J.Cribb
- Zieria adenodonta (F.Muell.) J.A.Armstr.
- Zieria granulata (F.Muell.) C.Moore ex Benth.
- Zieria veronicea (F.Muell.) Benth.
- Ziziphus quadrilocularis F.Muell.
- Zornia chaetophora F.Muell.
- Zygogynum howeanum (F.Muell.) Vink
- Zygogynum semecarpoides (F.Muell.) Vink
- Zygophyllum ammophilum F.Muell.
- Zygophyllum apiculatum F.Muell.
- Zygophyllum aurantiacum (Lindl.) F.Muell.
- Zygophyllum crenatum F.Muell.
- Zygophyllum glaucum F.Muell.
- Zygophyllum howittii F.Muell.
- Zygophyllum iodocarpum F.Muell.
- Zygophyllum prismatothecum F.Muell.
