= Carex contracta =

Scientific classification
- Kingdom: Plantae
- Clade: Tracheophytes
- Clade: Angiosperms
- Clade: Monocots
- Clade: Commelinids
- Order: Poales
- Family: Cyperaceae
- Genus: Carex
- Species: C. contracta

Binomial name
- Carex contracta F.Muell.

Species of plant

Carex contracta is a tussock-forming species of perennial sedge in the family Cyperaceae. It is native to parts of New South Wales.

== See also ==
- List of Carex species
