= Scambopus =

Scientific classification
- Kingdom: Plantae
- Clade: Tracheophytes
- Clade: Angiosperms
- Clade: Eudicots
- Clade: Rosids
- Order: Brassicales
- Family: Brassicaceae
- Genus: Scambopus; O.E.Schulz
- Species: S. curvipes

Binomial name
- Scambopus curvipes (F.Muell.) O.E.Schulz

Synonyms
- Blennodia curvipes (F.Muell.) F.Muell.; Erysimum curvipes F.Muell.; Sisymbrium curvipes F.Muell.

Genus of plants

Scambopus is a monotypic genus of flowering plants belonging to the family Brassicaceae. The only species is Scambopus curvipes, an annual or subshrub native to southern South Australia.
