= Chionanthus quadristamineus =

blue plum Lord Howe Island fringetree

Scientific classification
- Kingdom: Plantae
- Clade: Tracheophytes
- Clade: Angiosperms
- Clade: Eudicots
- Clade: Asterids
- Order: Lamiales
- Family: Oleaceae
- Genus: Chionanthus
- Species: C. quadristamineus

Binomial name
- Chionanthus quadristamineus F.Muell. (1873)

Synonyms
- Mayepea quadristaminea (F.Muell.) F.Muell. (1876); Linociera quadristaminea (F.Muell.) Knobl. (1895); Notelaea quadristaminea (F.Muell.) Hemsl. (1896)

Species of flowering plant

Chionanthus quadristamineus, commonly known as the blue plum, is a flowering plant in the olive family. The specific epithet refers to the four stamens in the flowers.

== Description ==
Chionanthus quadristamineus is a pale-barked, evergreen tree, growing to 15 m in height. The leathery, broadly elliptic to narrowly obovate leaves are 5–12 cm long and 3–6 cm wide. The small green flowers are 5 mm in diameter. The egg-shaped fruits are 5–6 cm long and dark blue when ripe. The flowering season is from November to May.

== Distribution and habitat ==
Chionanthus quadristamineus is endemic to Australia’s subtropical Lord Howe Island in the Tasman Sea. It is common in forest from sea-level to elevations of about 400 m in the southern mountains of the island.
