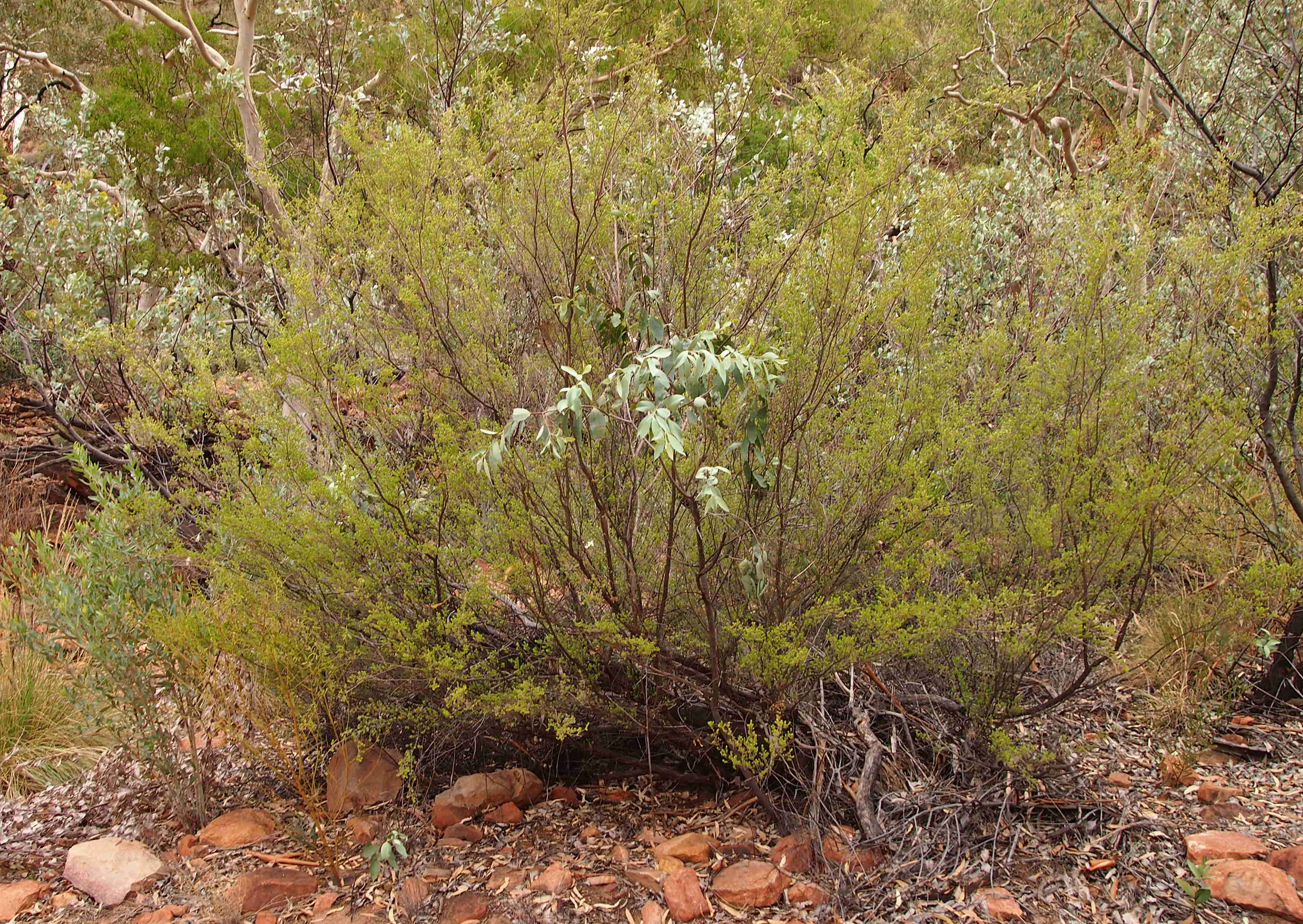
- Baeckea polystemonea

Scientific classification
- Kingdom: Plantae
- Clade: Embryophytes
- Clade: Tracheophytes
- Clade: Spermatophytes
- Clade: Angiosperms
- Clade: Eudicots
- Clade: Rosids
- Order: Myrtales
- Family: Myrtaceae
- Genus: Baeckea
- Species: B. polystemonea

Binomial name
- Baeckea polystemonea F.Muell.

= Baeckea polystemonea =

Species of flowering plant

Baeckea polystemonea, commonly known as the desert rock-myrtle, is a shrub found in central Australia.

The multi-stemmed shrub typically grows to a height of 0.5 to 2.5 metres (1.6 to 8.2 ft) and has smooth grey bark. The leaves are opposite, linear to oblong in shape and 2 to 8 millimetres (0.08 to 0.31 in) in length. It blooms between April and August producing pink and white flowers.

It is found on sand plains and rocky hillsides in central parts of the Goldfields-Esperance region of Western Australia near the border with South Australia and the Northern Territory and extending into southern parts of the Northern Territory where it grows in skeletal sandy soils over quartzite.

The species was first formally described by the botanist Ferdinand von Mueller in 1861 in the work Fragmenta Phytographiae Australiae

== See also ==
- List of Baeckea species
