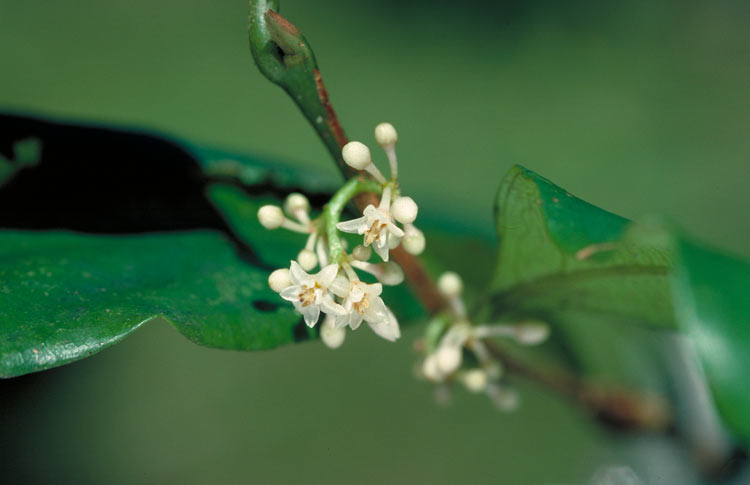

Conservation status
- Least Concern (NCA)

Scientific classification
- Kingdom: Plantae
- Clade: Embryophytes
- Clade: Tracheophytes
- Clade: Spermatophytes
- Clade: Angiosperms
- Clade: Eudicots
- Clade: Rosids
- Order: Rosales
- Family: Rhamnaceae
- Genus: Schistocarpaea; F.Muell.
- Species: S. johnsonii

Binomial name
- Schistocarpaea johnsonii F.Muell.

= Schistocarpaea =

Johnson's Almond

Genus of plants

Schistocarpaea is a monotypic genus of flowering plants belonging to the family Rhamnaceae. The only species is Schistocarpaea johnsonii. Its native range is Queensland, Australia.
