= Solanum lucani =

Scientific classification
- Kingdom: Plantae
- Clade: Tracheophytes
- Clade: Angiosperms
- Clade: Eudicots
- Clade: Asterids
- Order: Solanales
- Family: Solanaceae
- Genus: Solanum
- Species: S. lucani

Binomial name
- Solanum lucani F.Muell.

Synonyms
- Solanum longissimum A.R.Bean

Species of plant

Solanum lucani is a species of flowering plant in the family Solanaceae, native to seasonally dry areas of northern Australia. It is a sprawling annual that does well in disturbed areas.
