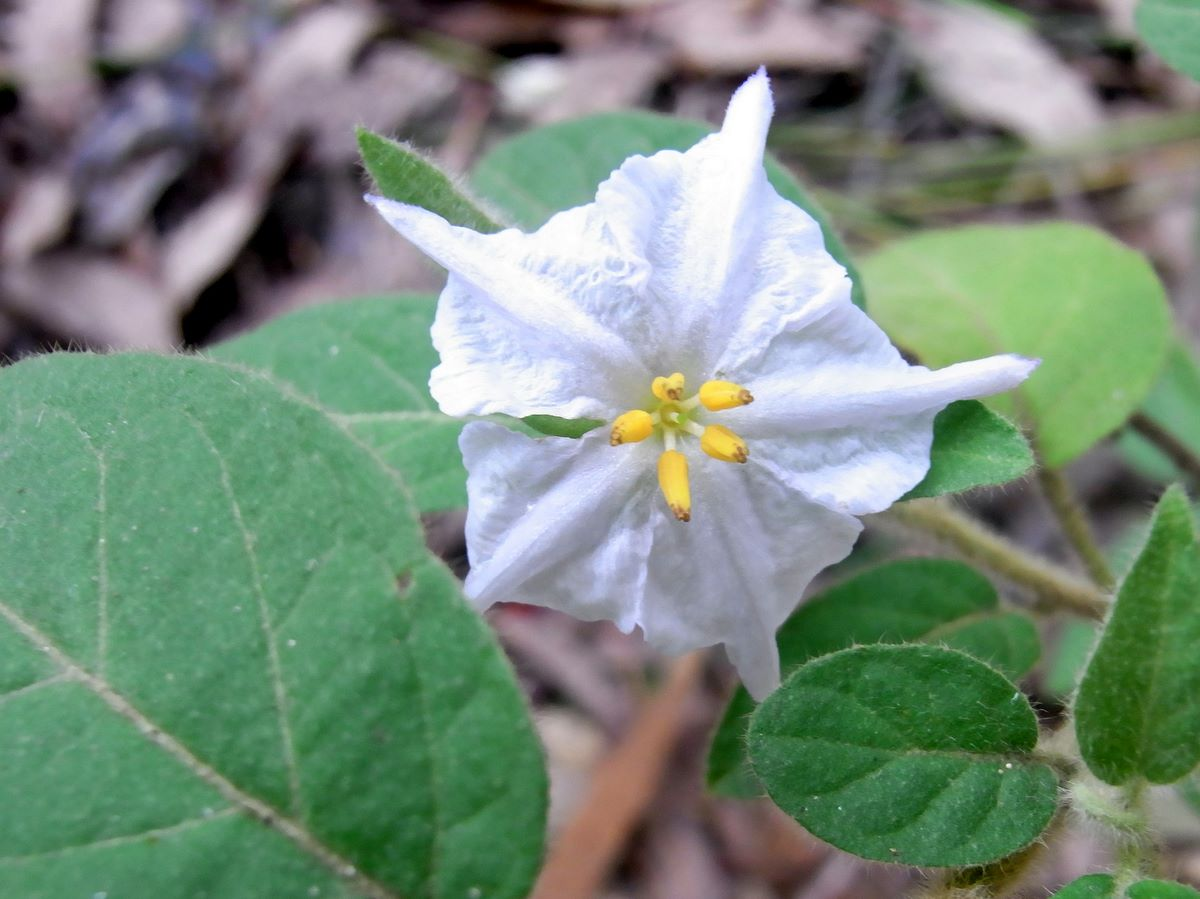

Scientific classification
- Kingdom: Plantae
- Clade: Tracheophytes
- Clade: Angiosperms
- Clade: Eudicots
- Clade: Asterids
- Order: Solanales
- Family: Solanaceae
- Genus: Solanum
- Species: S. densevestitum

Binomial name
- Solanum densevestitum F.Muell. ex Benth.

= Solanum densevestitum =

Species of flowering plant

Solanum densevestitum, the felty nightshade, is a plant growing in the east coast areas of Australia. It grows north of Woolgoolga in eucalyptus forest, rainforest and woodland areas, usually near the coast.

An erect shrub, up to a metre tall. Leaves are 6 to 9 cm long, 3 to 5 cm wide, covered in soft hairs. Oval, elliptic or narrow-ovate in shape. Pale violet flowers occur throughout the year, but are most often seen in spring or autumn. The red berry is around 7 mm in diameter, mostly covered by the calyx lobes.
