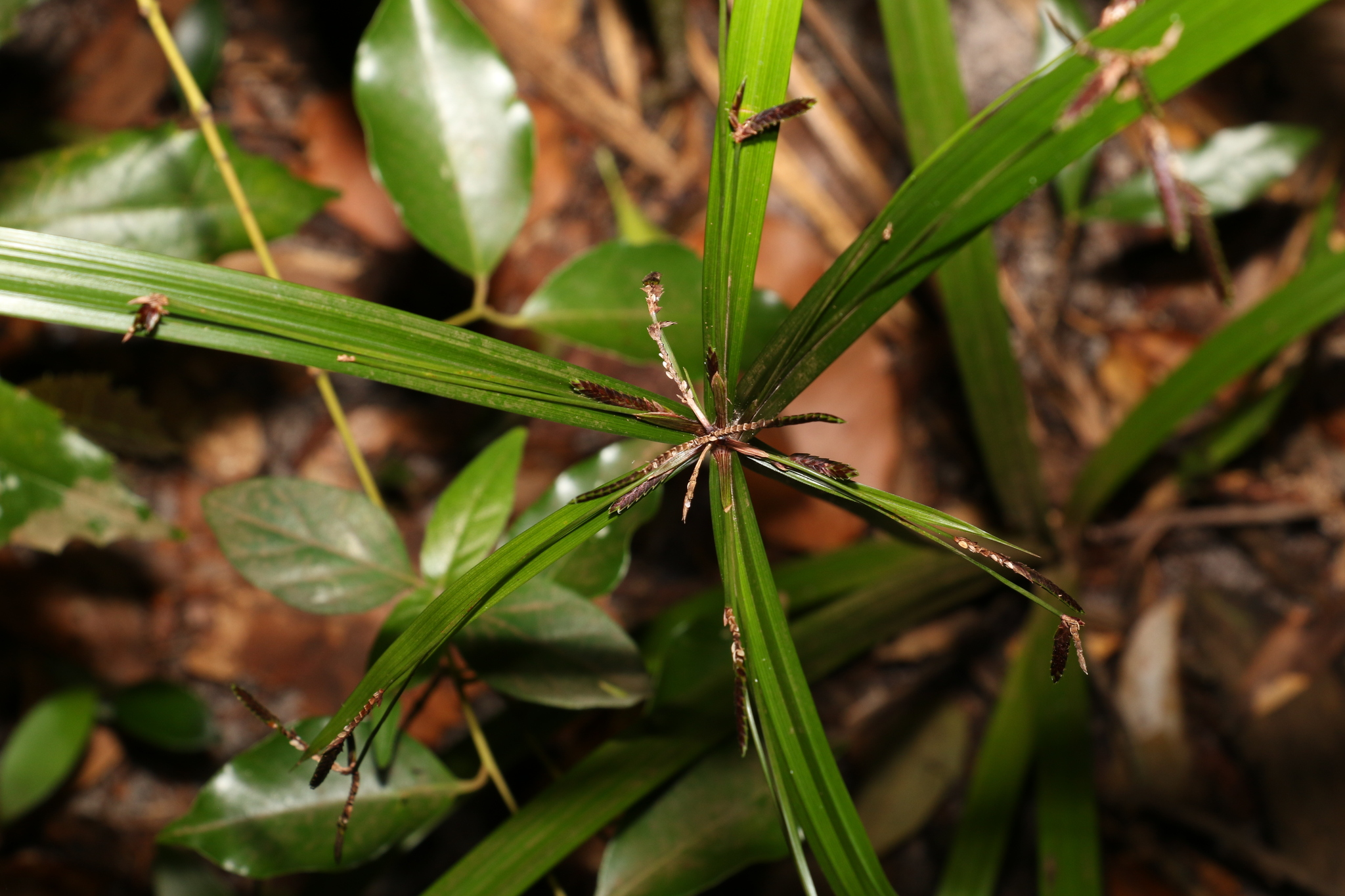

Scientific classification
- Kingdom: Plantae
- Clade: Tracheophytes
- Clade: Angiosperms
- Clade: Monocots
- Clade: Commelinids
- Order: Poales
- Family: Cyperaceae
- Genus: Cyperus
- Species: C. pedunculosus

Binomial name
- Cyperus pedunculosus F.Muell. 1874

= Cyperus pedunculosus =

Species of sedge

Cyperus pedunculosus is a species of sedge that is native to New Guinea and northern Australia.

== See also ==
- List of Cyperus species
