= Quoya paniculata =

Scientific classification
- Kingdom: Plantae
- Clade: Tracheophytes
- Clade: Angiosperms
- Clade: Eudicots
- Clade: Asterids
- Order: Lamiales
- Family: Lamiaceae
- Genus: Quoya
- Species: Q. paniculata

Binomial name
- Quoya paniculata F.Muell.

Synonyms
- Chloanthes paniculata (F.Muell.) F.Muell.; Pityrodia paniculata (F.Muell.) Benth.

Species of flowering plant

Quoya paniculata is a flowering plant in the mint family Lamiaceae and is endemic to Western Australia. It is a shrub with its branches and leaves densely covered with a layer of woolly hairs. The flowers are usually arranged in small groups surrounded by woolly hairs and are bell-shaped and deep purple or deep lilac. It is similar to Dasymalla axillaris and D. terminalis but is distinguished from them by its wedge-shaped leaf ends and more northerly distribution.

== Description ==
Quoya paniculata is an erect shrub, growing to a height of about 1.0 m (3 ft) and which has its branches densely covered with woolly, branched, greenish-white hairs. The leaves are arranged in opposite pairs and are elliptic to lance-shaped with wedge-shaped ends, 30–60 mm (1–2 in) long, 6–15 mm (0.2–0.6 in) wide and densely covered with woolly hairs. The flowers are arranged in groups of up to five, the groups 50–150 mm (2–6 in) long. Each flower is borne on a woolly pedicel 2–5 mm (0.08–0.2 in) long and is surrounded by bracts and bracteoles which are woolly on the outer surface and mostly glabrous on the inner one. The five sepals are deep purple-lilac, hairy on the outside and joined at their bases. The five petals are a deep lilac colour and joined to form a bell-shaped tube with two "lips" on the end. The upper lip has two lobes and the lower one three. The five lobes are more or less circular with the central lobe of the lower lip about twice as large as the other four. The four stamens are about the same length as the tube, one pair shorter than the other. Flowering occurs mainly from May to December and is followed by fruit which is hairy, almost spherical and has the sepals attached.

== Taxonomy and naming ==
Quoya paniculata was first formally described in 1864 by Ferdinand von Mueller and published in Fragmenta phytographiae Australiae from a specimen collected by Maitland Brown near Shark Bay. The specific epithet (paniculata) is a Latin word meaning "paniculate".

In 1870, George Bentham changed the name to Pityrodia paniculata but in 2011, Barry Conn, Murray Henwood and Nikola Streiber changed it back to Q. paniculata.

== Distribution and habitat ==
This quoya grows in sand and gravelly soil on sandplains mainly between Geraldton and Karratha in the Carnarvon, Dampierland, Gascoyne, Murchison and Pilbara biogeographic regions.

== Conservation ==
Quoya paniculata is classified as "not threatened" by the Western Australian Government Department of Parks and Wildlife.
