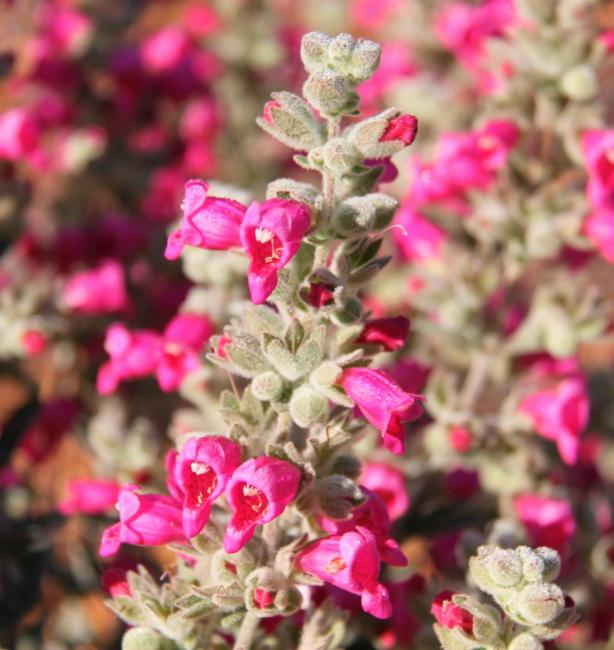
- Quoya verbascina growing near Mullewa

Scientific classification
- Kingdom: Plantae
- Clade: Tracheophytes
- Clade: Angiosperms
- Clade: Eudicots
- Clade: Asterids
- Order: Lamiales
- Family: Lamiaceae
- Genus: Quoya
- Species: Q. verbascina

Binomial name
- Quoya verbascina (F.Muell.) B.J.Conn & Henwood
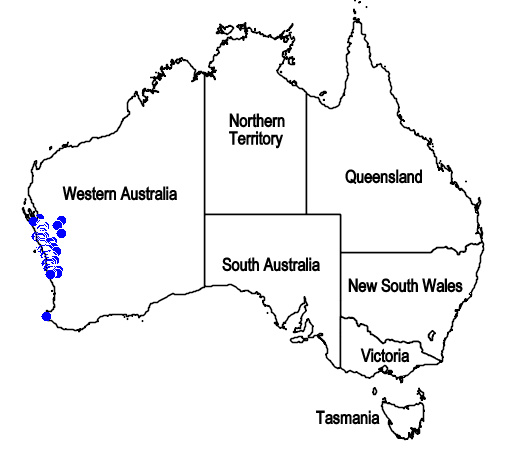

Synonyms
- Chloanthes verbascina F.Muell.; Pityrodia verbascina (F.Muell.) Benth.

= Quoya verbascina =

Golden bush

Species of flowering plant

Quoya verbascina, commonly known as golden bush, is a flowering plant in the mint family Lamiaceae and is endemic to Western Australia. It is an erect shrub with its branches and leaves densely covered with woolly hairs. The leaves are often oblong but very variable in shape and the flowers are pinkish-white with pink spots inside and are surrounded by yellow woolly sepals.

== Description ==
Quoya verbascina is an erect shrub with its main stem and branches densely covered with woolly, branched, dark brownish-red or pale brownish-yellow hairs, often appearing yellowish in the upper parts of the plant. The leaves are often elliptic to oblong in shape but otherwise very variable. They are mostly 3–7 cm (1–3 in) long, 1–3 cm (0.4–1 in) wide, thick, soft and densely covered with woolly hairs.

The flowers are arranged in the upper leaf axils, usually in a groups of between five and nine flowers, each on a woolly pedicel mostly 3–10 mm (0.1–0.4 in) long. There are bracts and smaller bracteoles which are woolly on the outside, at the base of the flowers. The five yellow sepals are 10–13 mm (0.4–0.5 in) long and joined at the base to form a tube 1–2 mm (0.04–0.08 in) long, with thin, lance-shaped lobes on the end. The sepal tube is densely covered with woolly hairs on the outside and more or less glabrous on the inside. The petals are pinkish-white with pink spots inside the petal tube. The five petals are 12–18 mm (0.5–0.7 in) long, forming a tube 6–8 mm (0.2–0.3 in) long with a wide opening and five lobes. The two upper lobes are short and oblong, the two lower outer lobes are small and triangular and the middle lobe is more than twice as large as the other four. The outside of the petal tube is covered with short, soft hairs and is glabrous inside apart from a ring of hairs around the ovary. The four stamens are about as long as the petal tube, the upper pair much shorter than the lower pair. Flowering occurs mainly from July to December and is followed by fruit which is a curved oval shape, 2.5–3 mm (0.098–0.12 in) long, covered with soft hairs and has the sepals attached.

== Taxonomy and naming ==
This species was first formally described in 1859 by Ferdinand von Mueller who gave it the name Chloanthes verbascina. The description was published in Fragmenta phytographiae Australiae from a specimen collected by Augustus Oldfield near the Murchison River. In 1870, George Bentham changed the name to Pityrodia verbascina but in 2011, Barry Conn and Murray Henwood changed it to Quoya verbascina and published the change in Australian Systematic Botany. The specific epithet (verbascina) is derived from the Latin name for the plant commonly known as "mullein".

== Distribution and habitat ==
Golden bush mostly grows in shrubland or in kwongan, often on road verges. It is mostly found between Carnarvon and Moora in the Avon Wheatbelt, Carnarvon, Geraldton Sandplains, Murchison, Swan Coastal Plain and Yagoo biogeographic regions.

== Conservation ==
Quoya verbascina is classified as "not threatened" by the Western Australian Government Department of Parks and Wildlife.
