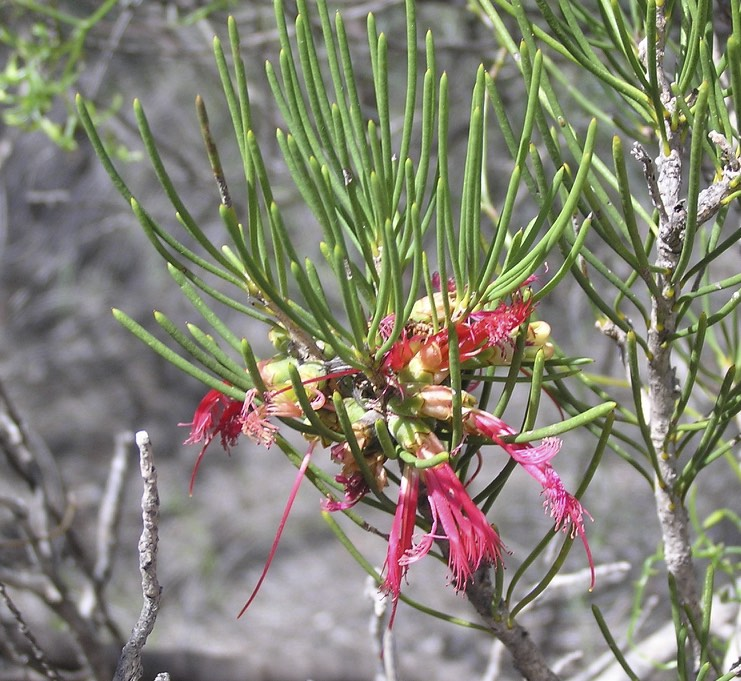

Scientific classification
- Kingdom: Plantae
- Clade: Tracheophytes
- Clade: Angiosperms
- Clade: Eudicots
- Clade: Rosids
- Order: Myrtales
- Family: Myrtaceae
- Genus: Calothamnus
- Species: C. oldfieldii

Binomial name
- Calothamnus oldfieldii F.Muell.

Synonyms
- Melaleuca augusti-oldfieldii Craven & R.D.Edwards

= Calothamnus oldfieldii =

Species of flowering plant

Calothamnus oldfieldii is a plant in the myrtle family, Myrtaceae and is endemic to the south-west of Western Australia. It is a small, spreading shrub with needle-shaped leaves and clusters of red flowers with 5 petals and 5 stamen bundles. (In 2014 Craven, Edwards and Cowley proposed that the species be renamed Melaleuca augusti-oldfieldii.)

== Description ==
Calothamnus oldfieldii is a small shrub growing to a height of about 1.5 metres (5 ft). Its leaves are 25–50 millimetres (1–2 in) long and nearly circular in cross section and taper to a pointed end.

The flowers are bright red and arranged in small groups and the stamens are arranged in 5 claw-like bundles. Flowering occurs from July to November and is followed by fruits which are woody capsules about 5 millimetres (0.2 in) long.

== Taxonomy and naming ==
Calothamnus oldfieldii was first formally described in 1862 Ferdinand von Mueller in Fragmenta Phytographiae Australiae from specimens collected near the Murchison River by Augustus Oldfield. The specific epithet (oldfieldii) honours the collector of the type specimens.

== Distribution and habitat ==
Calothamnus oldfieldii occurs in the Carnarvon, Geraldton Sandplains and Yalgoo biogeographic regions where it grows in sandy kwongan.

== Conservation ==
Calothamnus oldfieldii is classified as "not threatened" by the Western Australian government department of parks and wildlife.
