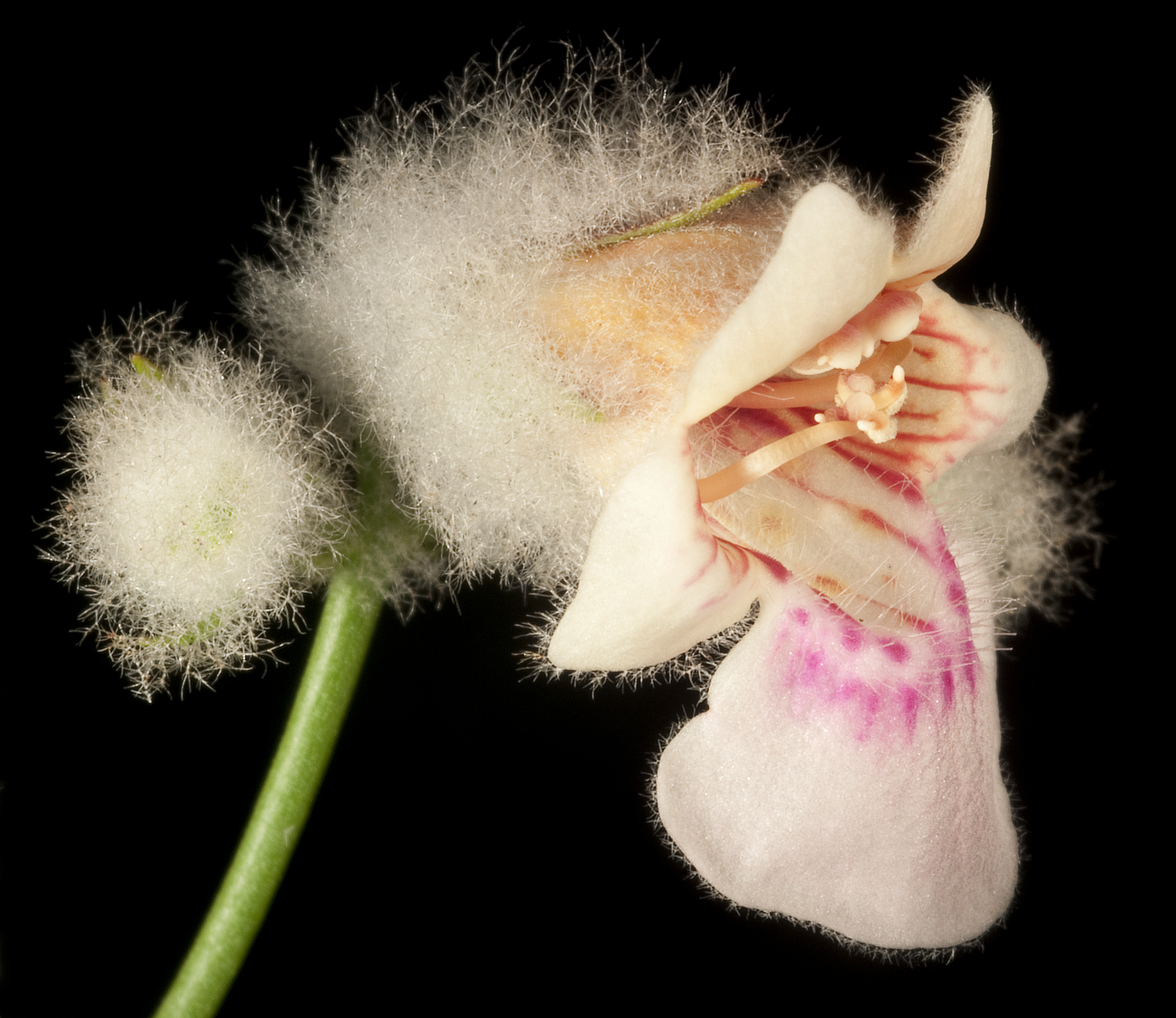

Scientific classification
- Kingdom: Plantae
- Clade: Tracheophytes
- Clade: Angiosperms
- Clade: Eudicots
- Clade: Asterids
- Order: Lamiales
- Family: Lamiaceae
- Genus: Quoya
- Species: Q. loxocarpa

Binomial name
- Quoya loxocarpa (F.Muell.) B.J.Conn & Henwood
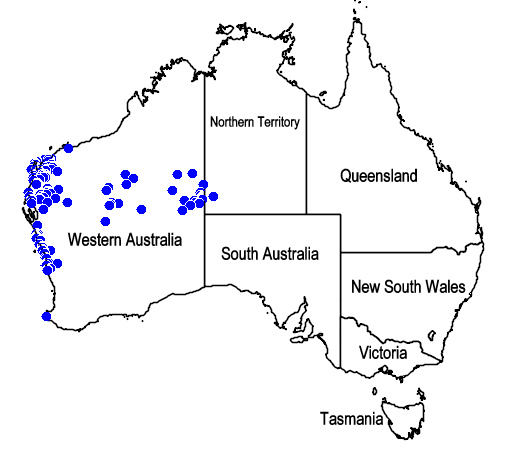

Synonyms
- Pityrodia loxocarpa (F.Muell.) Druce

= Quoya loxocarpa =

Species of flowering plant

Quoya loxocarpa is a flowering plant in the mint family Lamiaceae and is endemic to Western Australia and the Northern Territory. It is an open shrub with many spindly tangled branches. The leaves are oblong and woolly when young and the flowers are whitish pink with purple spots inside and are surrounded by woolly sepals.

== Description ==
Quoya loxocarpa is an open shrub with many spindly, interlacing branches mostly rising from the base of the plant. The leaves are elliptic to oblong in shape, sometimes almost round, 1–4 centimetres (0.39–1.6 in) long, 1–3 cm (0.39–1.2 in) wide, usually with the edges wavy or irregularly toothed. They have loose, woolly hairs when young but become glabrous as they mature.

The flowers are arranged in the upper leaf axils, usually in a groups of 3 to 7 flowers on a thin stalk 2.5–8 mm (0.098–0.31 in) long. There are bracts 3–5 mm (0.12–0.20 in) long, woolly on the outside surface, at the base of the groups and small bracteoles. The five sepals are 4–6 mm (0.16–0.24 in) long and form a tube at the base 1–2 mm (0.039–0.079 in) long, with thin, lance-shaped lobes on the end. The sepal tube is densely covered with purplish, woolly hairs on the outside and glabrous on the inside. The petals are whitish pink with purple spots in the throat, 12–20 mm (0.47–0.79 in) long, forming a tube with a wide opening and five short broad lobes. The lowest lobe is very broad, more or less circular, 5–8 mm (0.20–0.31 in) long and 7–11 mm (0.28–0.43 in) wide. The other four lobes are about half that size and roughly similar to each other. The outside of the petal tube is covered with short, soft hairs and is glabrous inside, apart from a ring of hairs around the ovary and a few long hairs on the largest petal lobe. The four stamens are shorter than the petal tube, the upper pair much shorter than the lower pair. Flowering occurs mainly from July to November and is followed by fruit which is a curved oval shape, 2.5–3 mm (0.098–0.12 in) long and has the sepals attached.

== Taxonomy and naming ==
This species was first formally described in 1860 by Ferdinand von Mueller who gave it the name Chloanthes loxocarpa. The description was published in Fragmenta phytographiae Australiae from a specimen collected by Augustus Oldfield near the Murchison River. In 1917, George Druce changed the name to Pityrodia loxocarpa but in 2011, Barry Conn and Murray Henwood changed the name to Quoya loxocarpa and published the change in Australian Systematic Botany. The specific epithet (loxocarpa) is derived from the Ancient Greek words loxos meaning "slanting" and karpos meaning "fruit".

== Distribution and habitat ==
This quoya mostly grows in shrubland in coastal areas in sand over limestone however it is also found in inland areas near Wiluna and Carnegie and near the border with South Australia and the Northern Territory. There are a few records from the Northern Territory.

== Conservation ==
Quoya loxocarpa is classified as "not threatened" by the Western Australian Government Department of Parks and Wildlife.
