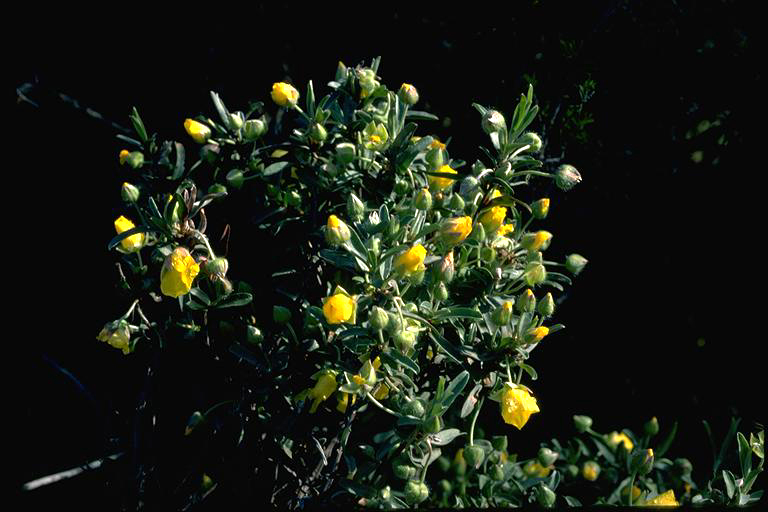
- Near Coorow

Scientific classification
- Kingdom: Plantae
- Clade: Tracheophytes
- Clade: Angiosperms
- Clade: Eudicots
- Order: Dilleniales
- Family: Dilleniaceae
- Genus: Hibbertia
- Species: H. potentilliflora

Binomial name
- Hibbertia potentilliflora Benth.

= Hibbertia potentilliflora =

Species of flowering plant

Hibbertia potentilliflora is a species of flowering plant in the family Dilleniaceae and is endemic to the west of Western Australia. It is an erect or low-lying shrub that typically grows to a height of 15–60 cm (5.9–23.6 in) and has yellow flowers. It was first formally described in 1863 by George Bentham in Flora Australiensis from specimens collected from the Swan River Colony by James Drummond and from near the Murchison River by Augustus Oldfield. The specific epithet (potentilliflora) means "Potentilla-flowered".

Hibbertia potentilliflora grows in a range of soils on rocky hillsides and coastal sandstone in the Avon Wheatbelt and Geraldton Sandplains biogeographic regions of western Western Australia. It is classified as "not threatened" by the Western Australian Government Department of Parks and Wildlife.

== See also ==
- List of Hibbertia species
