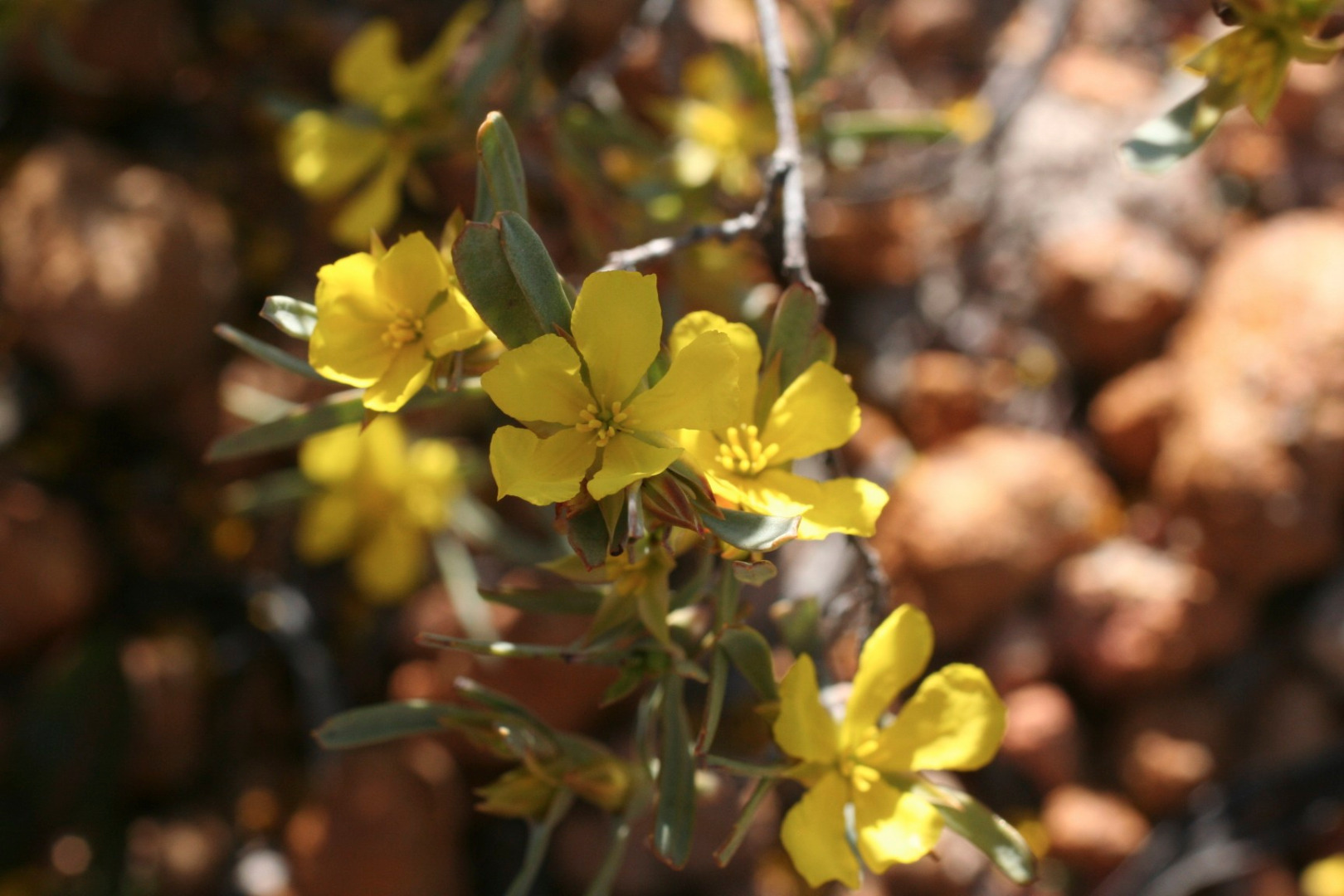

Scientific classification
- Kingdom: Plantae
- Clade: Tracheophytes
- Clade: Angiosperms
- Clade: Eudicots
- Order: Dilleniales
- Family: Dilleniaceae
- Genus: Hibbertia
- Species: H. desmophylla

Binomial name
- Hibbertia desmophylla (Benth.) F.Muell.

Synonyms
- Candollea desmophylla Benth.

= Hibbertia desmophylla =

Species of flowering plant

Hibbertia desmophylla is a species of flowering plant in the family Dilleniaceae and is endemic to the south-west of Western Australia. It is a sprawling or erect, hairy shrub with spreading, densely clustered, linear leaves and yellow flowers with eleven to thirteen stamens.

== Description ==
Hibbertia desmophylla is a sprawling or erect shrub that typically grows to a height of up to 1.0 m (3 ft 3 in), its foliage covered with tangled, curled hairs. The leaves are densely clustered on short side-shoots, linear, 6–17 mm (0.24–0.67 in) long and 1–1.5 mm (0.039–0.059 in) wide and more or less sessile. The flowers are usually arranged singly, sometimes in pairs or groups of three, on the ends of short side-shoots and are 10–15 mm (0.39–0.59 in) in diameter. There are up to three inconspicuous, egg-shaped bracts 1–3 mm (0.039–0.118 in) long. The five sepals are joined at the base, the sepal lobes elliptic to egg-shaped and tinged with pink, the outer sepal lobes 4–5 mm (0.16–0.20 in) long and the inner lobes 5–6 mm (0.20–0.24 in) long. The five petals are yellow, egg-shaped with the narrower end towards the base, 5–10 mm (0.20–0.39 in) long and there are usually eleven to thirteen stamens in three groups around the three glabrous carpels each with a single ovule. Flowering has been recorded from September to February.

== Taxonomy ==
This species was first formally described in 1863 by George Bentham who gave it the name Candollea desmophylla in Flora Australiensis from specimens collected by Augustus Oldfield near the Murchison River. In 1880, Ferdinand von Mueller changed the name to Hibbertia desmophylla in Fragmenta phytographiae Australiae. The specific epithet (desmophylla) means "halter-leaved", referring to the arrangement of the leaves around the flowers.

== Distribution and habitat ==
Hibbertia desmophylla grows in sandy soil in heath, shrubland and woodland from near the Murchison River to the Moore River National Park in the Geraldton Sandplains biogeographic region in the south-west of Western Australia.

== Conservation status ==
Hibbertia desmophylla is classified as "not threatened" by the Government of Western Australia Department of Parks and Wildlife.

== See also ==
- List of Hibbertia species
