= Swainsona gracilis =

Scientific classification
- Kingdom: Plantae
- Clade: Tracheophytes
- Clade: Angiosperms
- Clade: Eudicots
- Clade: Rosids
- Order: Fabales
- Family: Fabaceae
- Subfamily: Faboideae
- Genus: Swainsona
- Species: S. gracilis

Binomial name
- Swainsona gracilis Benth.

Species of legume

Swainsona gracilis is a species of flowering plant in the family Fabaceae and is endemic to the south-west of Western Australia. It is a prostrate or ascending perennial herb with imparipinnate leaves with up to 15 wedge-shaped or narrowly oblong leaflets, and racemes of up to 4 purple or blue flowers.

== Description ==
Swainsona gracilis is a prostrate or ascending perennial herb that typically grows to a height 30–40 cm (12–16 in) and has several stems 1–2 mm (0.039–0.079 in) wide, arising from a taproot. Its leaves are imparipinnate 15–70 mm (0.59–2.76 in) long with up to 15 wedge-shaped or narrowly oblong leaflets 1–8 mm (0.039–0.315 in) long and 1–3 mm (0.039–0.118 in) wide on a very long petiole. There is a stipule often 3–4 mm (0.12–0.16 in) long at the base of the petiole. The flowers are arranged in racemes 60–120 mm (2.4–4.7 in) of up to 4 on a peduncle 0.5–1 mm (0.020–0.039 in) long, each flower mostly 5–7 mm (0.20–0.28 in) long in the top 10–20 mm (0.39–0.79 in) of the peduncle. The sepals are joined at the base, forming a tube about 2 mm (0.079 in) long, the sepal lobes shorter than the tube. The petals are purple or blue, the standard petal 7.0–8.5 mm (0.28–0.33 in) long, the wings 6.5–6.7 mm (0.26–0.26 in) long, and the keel 7.0–7.5 mm (0.28–0.30 in) long. Flowering occurs in August and September, and the fruit is a glabrous pod 7–10 mm (0.28–0.39 in) long and 6–7 mm (0.24–0.28 in) wide with the remains of the twisted style about 4 mm (0.16 in) long.

== Taxonomy and naming ==
Swainsona gracilis was first formally described in 1864 by George Bentham in his Flora Australiensis, from specimens collected near the Murchison River by Augustus Oldfield. The specific epithet (gracilis) means "thin" or "slender".

== Distribution and habitat ==
This species of pea grows in a variety of soils in moist places in the Avon Wheatbelt, Carnarvon, Coolgardie, Gascoyne, Geraldton Sandplains, Murchison and Yalgoo bioregions of Western Australia.

== Conservation status ==
Swainsona gracilis is listed as "not threatened" by the Western Australian Government Department of Biodiversity, Conservation and Attractions.
