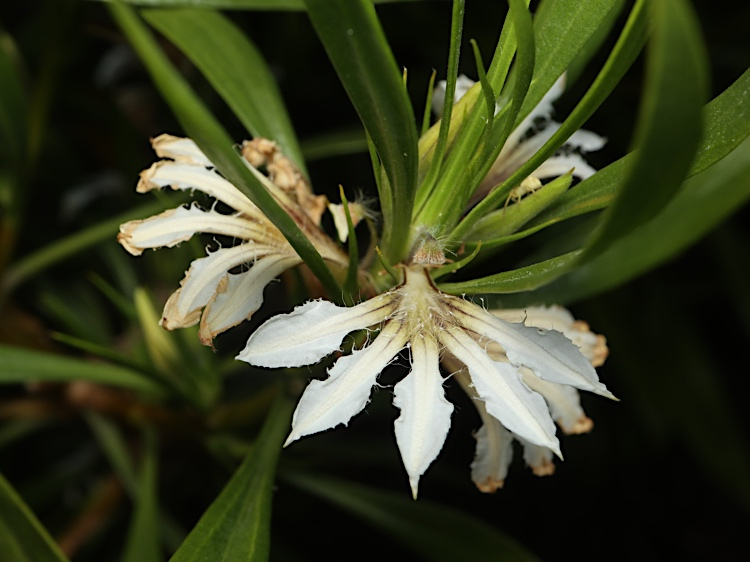
- In Kings Park Botanic Gardens

Scientific classification
- Kingdom: Plantae
- Clade: Embryophytes
- Clade: Tracheophytes
- Clade: Spermatophytes
- Clade: Angiosperms
- Clade: Eudicots
- Clade: Asterids
- Order: Asterales
- Family: Goodeniaceae
- Genus: Scaevola
- Species: S. oldfieldii

Binomial name
- Scaevola oldfieldii F.Muell.
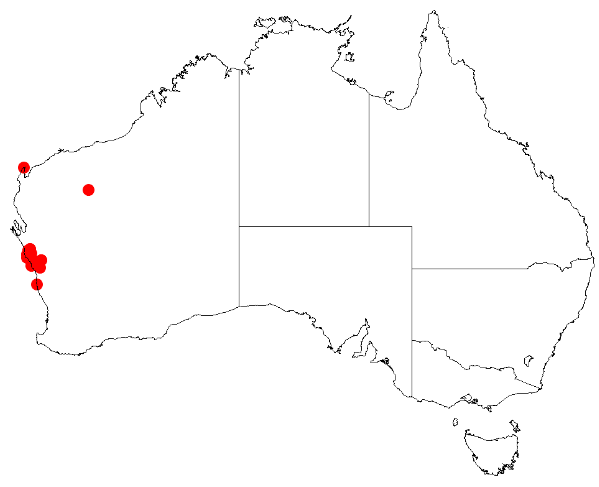
- Occurrence data from AVH

Synonyms
- Lobelia oldfieldii (F.Muell.) Kuntze; Scaevola oldfieldii F.Muell. var. oldfieldii; Scaevola oldfieldii var. tomentosa E.Pritz.

= Scaevola oldfieldii =

Species of shrub

Scaevola oldfieldii is a species of flowering plant in the family Goodeniaceae and is endemic to the south-west of Western Australia. It is an erect shrub with lance-shaped leaves, spikes of white flowers with maroon streaks, and barrel-shaped fruit.

== Description ==
Scaevola oldfieldii is an erect shrub that typically grows up to 2.3 m (7 ft 7 in) and has glabrous stems. Its leaves are lance-shaped, sometimes with the narrower end towards the base, 75.7–92.3 mm (2.98–3.63 in) long and 12.1–19.7 mm (0.48–0.78 in) wide with smooth or toothed edges. The flowers are white with maroon streaks along the veins, sessile, 11–21 mm (0.43–0.83 in) long and 10–15 mm (0.39–0.59 in) wide, borne singly in leaf axils or in spikes usually up to 30 mm (1.2 in) long, with dagger-shaped bracteoles more than 3/4 the length of the petals. The ovary is barrel-shaped with a single locule with two ovules. Flowering occurs from August to December and the fruit is barrel-shaped, 3.2 mm (0.13 in) long and 1.4 mm (0.055 in) wide.

== Taxonomy ==
Scaevola oldfieldii was first formally described in 1860 by Ferdinand von Mueller in his Fragmenta Phytographiae Australiae from specimens collected near the Murchison River by Augustus Oldfield. The specific epithet (oldfieldii) honours the collector of the type specimens.

== Distribution and habitat ==
This species of Scaevola grows on rocky slopes in mixed shrubland growing on shallow, sandy soils between the Murchison River and Geraldton in the Geraldton Sandplains bioregion of south-western Western Australia.

== Conservation status ==
Scaevola oldfieldii is listed as "Priority Three" by the Government of Western Australia Department of Biodiversity, Conservation and Attractions, meaning that it is poorly known and known from only a few locations but is not under imminent threat.
