= Persoonia brachystylis =

Scientific classification
- Kingdom: Plantae
- Clade: Tracheophytes
- Clade: Angiosperms
- Clade: Eudicots
- Order: Proteales
- Family: Proteaceae
- Genus: Persoonia
- Species: P. brachystylis

Binomial name
- Persoonia brachystylis F.Muell.

Synonyms
- Linkia brachystylis (F.Muell.) Kuntze

Species of flowering plant

Persoonia brachystylis is a species of flowering plant in the family Proteaceae and is endemic to a restricted area on the west coast of Western Australia. It is an erect, spreading shrub with smooth bark, narrow spatula-shaped to lance-shaped leaves and yellow flowers in groups of ten to twenty.

== Description ==
Persoonia brachystylis is a shrub that typically grows to a height of 1–1.5 m (3 ft 3 in – 4 ft 11 in) with mottled grey bark and branchlets that are densely hairy when young. The leaves are narrow spatula-shaped to linear or lance-shaped, 45–120 mm (1.8–4.7 in) long and 2–10 mm (0.079–0.394 in) wide. The flowers are cylindrical and arranged in groups of ten to twenty, each flower on a pedicel 7–15 mm (0.28–0.59 in) long. The tepals are bright yellow, 10–13 mm (0.39–0.51 in) long and 1.5–2.5 mm (0.059–0.098 in) wide, the anthers white. Flowering occurs from November to December or January and the fruit is an oval drupe 10–12 mm (0.39–0.47 in) long and 6–7 mm (0.24–0.28 in) wide.

== Taxonomy ==
Persoonia brachystylis was first formally described in 1868 by Ferdinand von Mueller in his book Fragmenta Phytographiae Australiae from specimens collected by Augustus Frederick Oldfield near the Murchison River.

== Distribution and habitat ==
This geebung is restricted to the Kalbarri National Park where it grows in low heath on sandplains, often over laterite.
