= Styphelia allittii =

Conservation status
- Priority Three — Poorly Known Taxa (DEC)

Scientific classification
- Kingdom: Plantae
- Clade: Embryophytes
- Clade: Tracheophytes
- Clade: Angiosperms
- Clade: Eudicots
- Clade: Asterids
- Order: Ericales
- Family: Ericaceae
- Genus: Styphelia
- Species: S. allittii

Binomial name
- Styphelia allittii (F.Muell.) F.Muell.
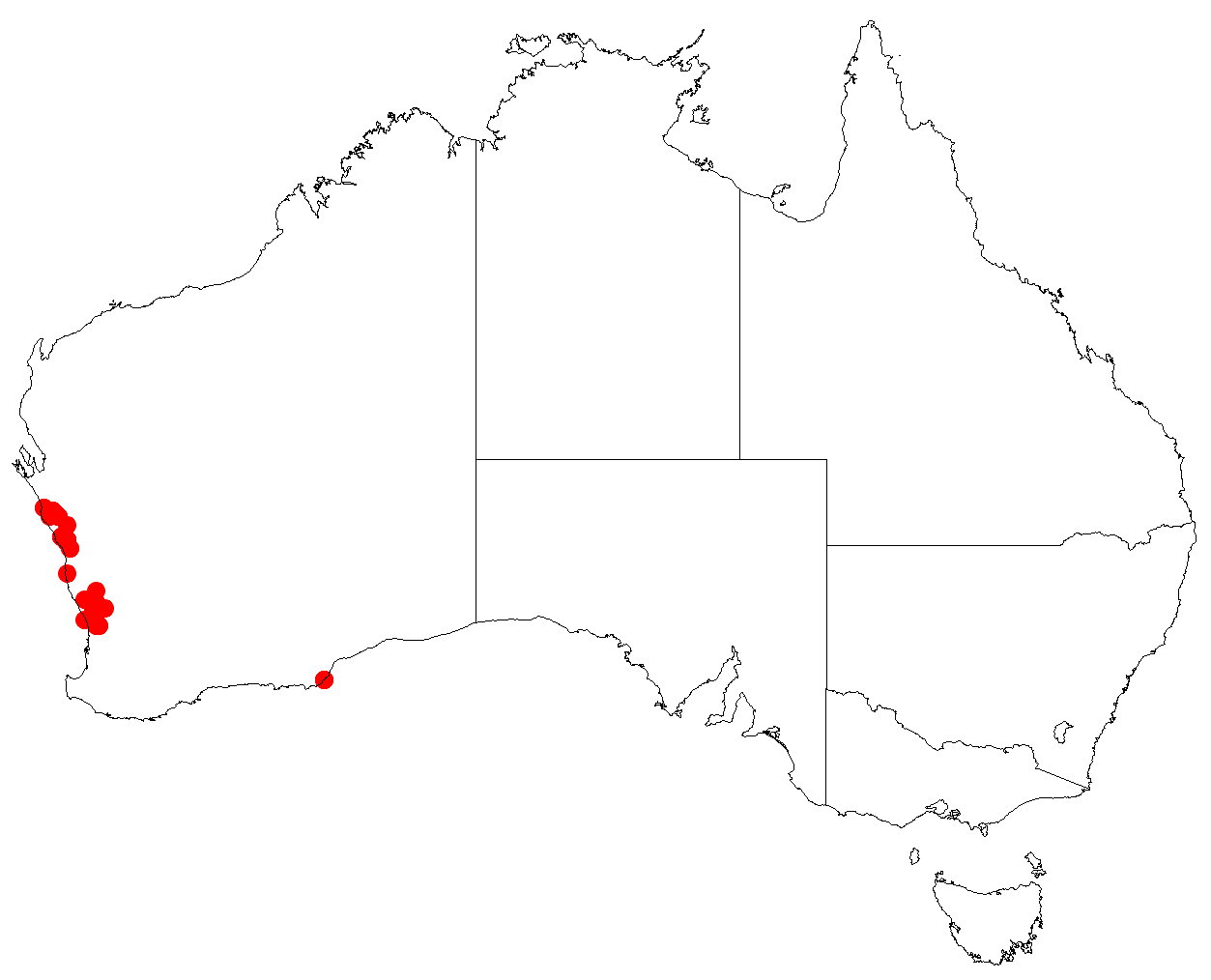
- Occurrence data from AVH

Synonyms
- Leucopogon allittii F.Muell.

Species of shrub

Styphelia allittii is a species of flowering plant in the family Ericaceae and is endemic to the south-west of Western Australia. It is a spreading, sparingly-branched shrub with spreading, glabrous, reddish branchlets, sharply pointed, lance-shaped to broadly lance-shaped, leathery leaves, tube-shaped white flowers borne in spreading to pendulous, racemes, and spherical, glabrous fruit.

== Description ==
Styphelia allittii is a spreading, sparingly branched shrub that typically grows to a height of 30–190 cm (12–75 in) tall, but is single-stemmed at ground level. Its branchlets are reddish, spreading and glabrous, the bark on older branches broadly fissured. The leaves are lance-shaped to broadly lance-shaped, 8–14.5 mm (0.31–0.57 in) long, 1.75–3.2 mm (0.069–0.126 in) wide on a petiole 0.63–0.96 mm (0.025–0.038 in) long, sharply pointed, glabrous and leathery with four to nine raised veins. The flowers are borne in spreading to pendulous racemes in upper axils and along the branchlets, each flower on a glabrous pedicel 0.7–0.9 mm (0.028–0.035 in) long. The bracts are broadly egg-shaped, 0.5–0.9 mm (0.020–0.035 in) long and 0.4–0.5 mm (0.016–0.020 in) wide and glabrous, the bracteoles overlapping, egg-shaped to broadly egg-shaped, 0.6–1.1 mm (0.024–0.043 in) long and 0.6–0.9 mm (0.024–0.035 in) wide. The sepals are egg-shaped, 1.8–2.5 mm (0.071–0.098 in) long and 0.6–0.8 mm (0.024–0.031 in) wide and shorter than the petal tube. The petals are white joined at the base, forming a tube 1.8–3.7 mm (0.071–0.146 in) 0.6–0.82 mm (0.024–0.032 in) long with lobes the same length. Flowering occurs from March to April, and the fruit is longer than the sepals, spherical and glabrous.

== Taxonomy ==
This species was first formally described in 1864 by Ferdinand von Mueller who gave it the name Leucopogon allittii in his Fragmenta Phytographiae Australiae from specimens collected near the Murchison River by Augustus Oldfield. In 1867, von Mueller transferred the species to Styphelia as S. allittii in a later volume of the same book. The specific epithet (allittii) honours William Allitt, who worked at the botanic gardens at Portland.

== Distribution and habitat ==
Styphelia allittii occurs in shrubland and woodland in loamy to clay-sandy soils in the Avon Wheatbelt, Geraldton Sandplains, Jarrah Forest and Swan Coastal Plain bioregions of south-western Western Australia.

== Conservation status ==
Styphelia allittii is listed as 'Priority Three' meaning that it is poorly known and known from only a few locations but is not under imminent threat.
