= Styphelia strongylophylla =

Scientific classification
- Kingdom: Plantae
- Clade: Tracheophytes
- Clade: Angiosperms
- Clade: Eudicots
- Clade: Asterids
- Order: Ericales
- Family: Ericaceae
- Genus: Styphelia
- Species: S. strongylophylla

Binomial name
- Styphelia strongylophylla (F.Muell.) F.Muell.
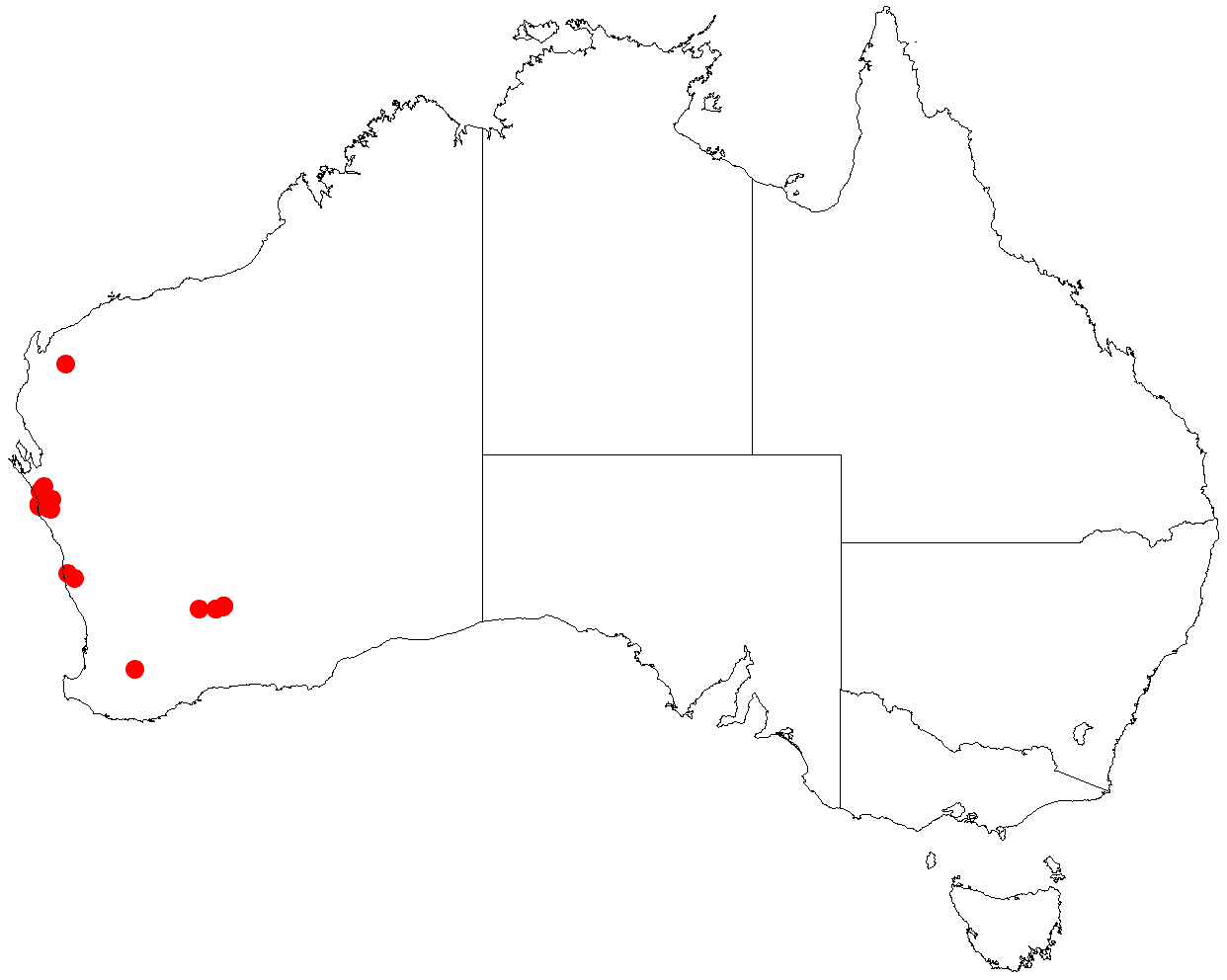
- Occurrence data from AVH

Synonyms
- Leucopogon strongylophyllus F.Muell.

Species of plant

Styphelia strongylophylla is a species of flowering plant in the heath family Ericaceae and is endemic to the southwest of Western Australia. It is an erect shrub with crowded egg-shaped or round leaves and white, tube-shaped flower arranged singly or in pairs in leaf axils.

== Description ==
Styphelia strongylophylla is an erect shrub, its young branchlets sometimes softly-hairy. Its leaves are crowded, sometimes erect, egg-shaped with the narrower end towards the base, or round, on a distinct petiiole. The leaves are prominently striated and sometimes have a minute, rigid point on the tip. The flowers are arranged singly or in pairs in leaf axils on a down-curved peduncle with minute bracts and broad bracteoles somewhat less than half as long as the sepals. The sepals are about 2 mm (0.079 in) long, and the petals white, about 4 mm (0.16 in) long, and joined at the base to form a tube with lobes longer than the petal tube.

== Taxonomy and naming ==
Styphelia strongylophylla was first formally described in 1864 by Ferdinand von Mueller, who gave it the name Leucopogon stronglyophyllus in his Fragmenta Phytographiae Australiae from specimens collected by Augustus Oldfield near the Murchison River. In a later volume of Fragmenta Phytographiae Australiae, Mueller transferred the species to Styphelia as S. strongylophylla.

The specific epithet (strongylophylla) means "rounded leaves".

== Distribution ==
This species occurs in the Geraldton Sandplains bioregion of south-western Western Australia.

== Conservation status ==
Styphelia strongylophylla is listed as "not threatened" by the Western Australian Government Department of Biodiversity, Conservation and Attractions.
