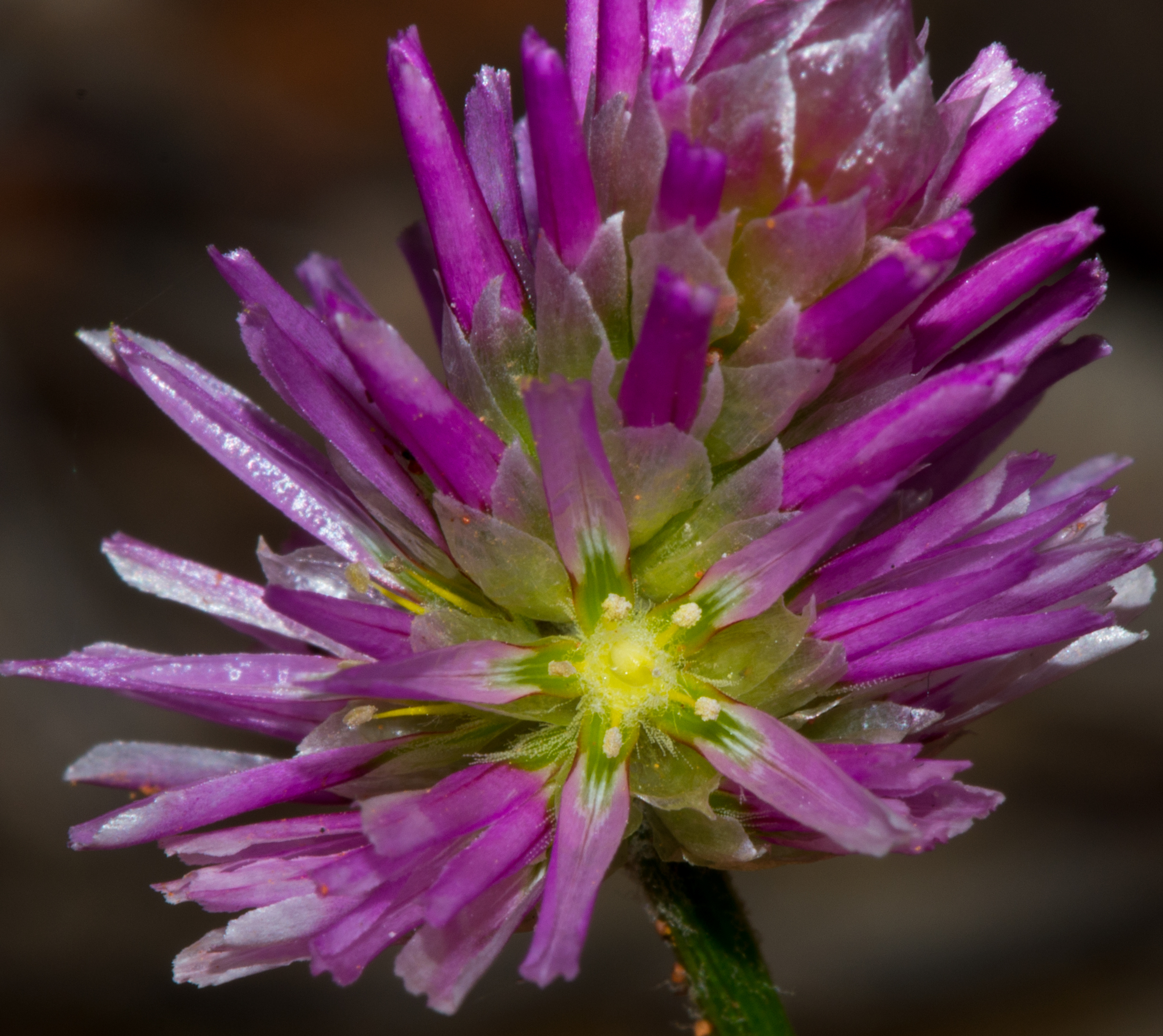

Scientific classification
- Kingdom: Plantae
- Clade: Tracheophytes
- Clade: Angiosperms
- Clade: Eudicots
- Order: Caryophyllales
- Family: Amaranthaceae
- Genus: Ptilotus
- Species: P. grandiflorus

Binomial name
- Ptilotus grandiflorus F.Muell.

Synonyms
- Ptilotus grandiflorus var. lepidus (F.Muell.) Benth.; Ptilotus grandiflorus F.Muell. var. grandiflorus; Ptilotus lepidus F.Muell.

= Ptilotus grandiflorus =

Species of grass-like plant

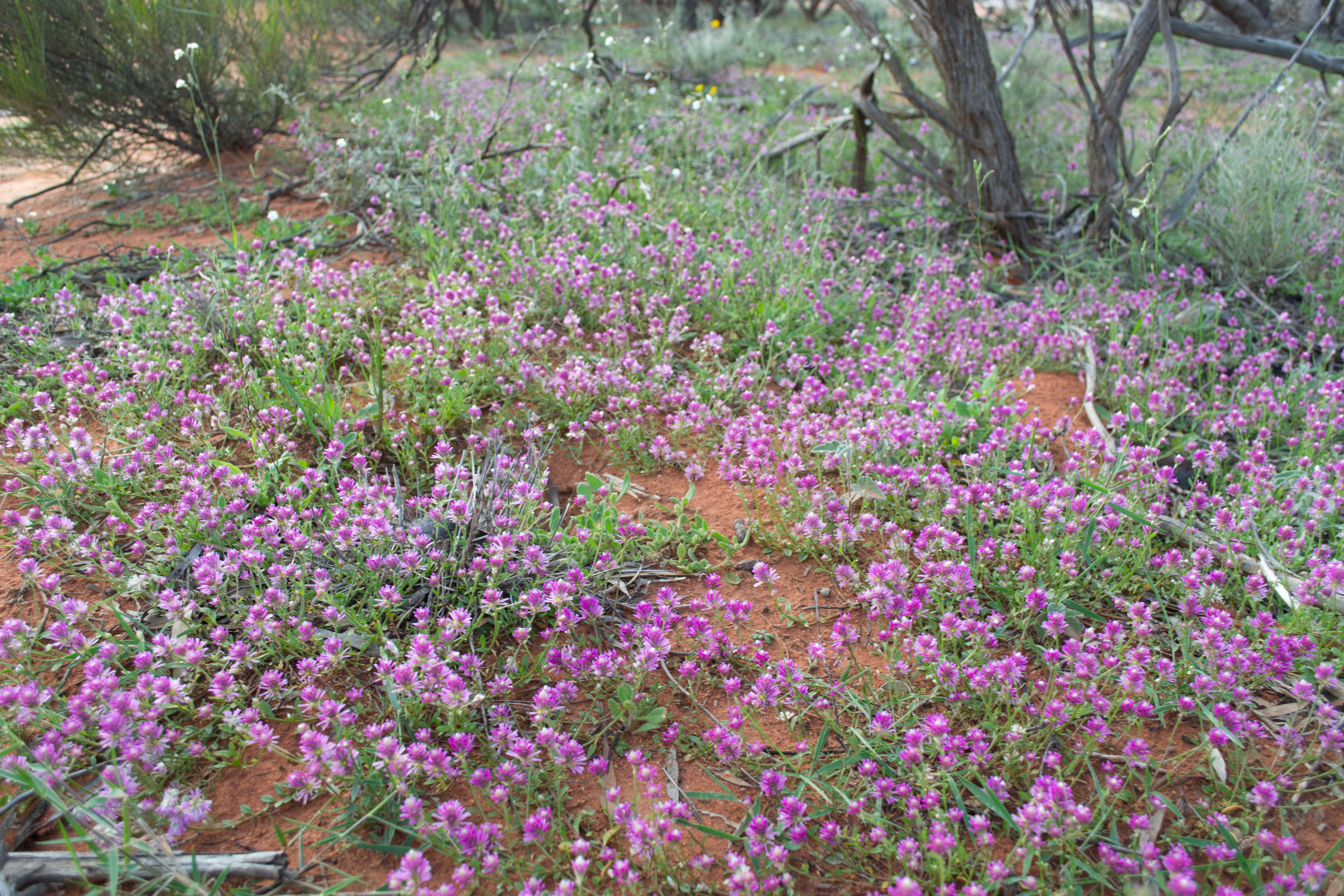
Habit

Ptilotus grandiflorus is a species of flowering plant in the family Amaranthaceae and is endemic to Western Australia. It is an ascending annual herb, with lance-shaped leaves, flowers arranged singly or in oval to cylindrical spikes of white or pink flowers.

== Description ==
Ptilotus grandiflorus is an ascending annual herb, that typically grows to a height of up to 10–30 cm (3.9–11.8 in), its stems ribbed and glabrous or with a sparse covering of simple hairs. The leaves on the stems are arranged alternately, lance-shaped with the narrower end towards the base, 5–40 mm (0.20–1.57 in) long and 1–10 mm (0.039–0.394 in) wide. The leaves at the base of the plant are 30–80 mm (1.2–3.1 in) long and 2–10 mm (0.079–0.394 in) wide. The flowers are pink or white and arranged singly or in oval to cylindrical clusters on the ends of stems, 10–35 mm (0.39–1.38 in) long and 14–23 mm (0.55–0.91 in) in diameter, with narrowly egg-shaped, translucent bracts 4.4–5.5 mm (0.17–0.22 in) long, and narrowly egg-shaped, glabrous bracteoles 4.4–5.3 mm (0.17–0.21 in) long. The outer tepals are pink to white, 6–10.5 mm (0.24–0.41 in) long and the inner tepals are 6–9.6 mm (0.24–0.38 in) long. There are 5 stamens, the style is slightly curved to straight, 1.1–1.2 mm (0.043–0.047 in) long and more or less fixed to the centre of the ovary. Flowering occurs from July to October.

== Taxonomy ==
Ptilotus grandiflorus was first formally described in 1859 by Ferdinand von Mueller in his Fragmenta Phytographiae Australiae, from specimens collected near the Murchison River by Augustus Oldfield. The specific epithet (grandiflorus) means 'large-flowered'.

== Distribution and habitat ==
This species of Ptilotus often grows in red sand or sandy loams in Acacia scrubland or Eucalyptus woodland in near-coastal areas between Shark Bay and Geraldton in the Avon Wheatbelt, Carnarvon, Coolgardie, Geraldton Sandplains, Murchison and Yalgoo bioregions of Western Australia.

== Conservation status ==
Ptilotus grandiflorus is listed as "not threatened" by the Government of Western Australia Department of Biodiversity, Conservation and Attractions.

== See also ==
- List of Ptilotus species
