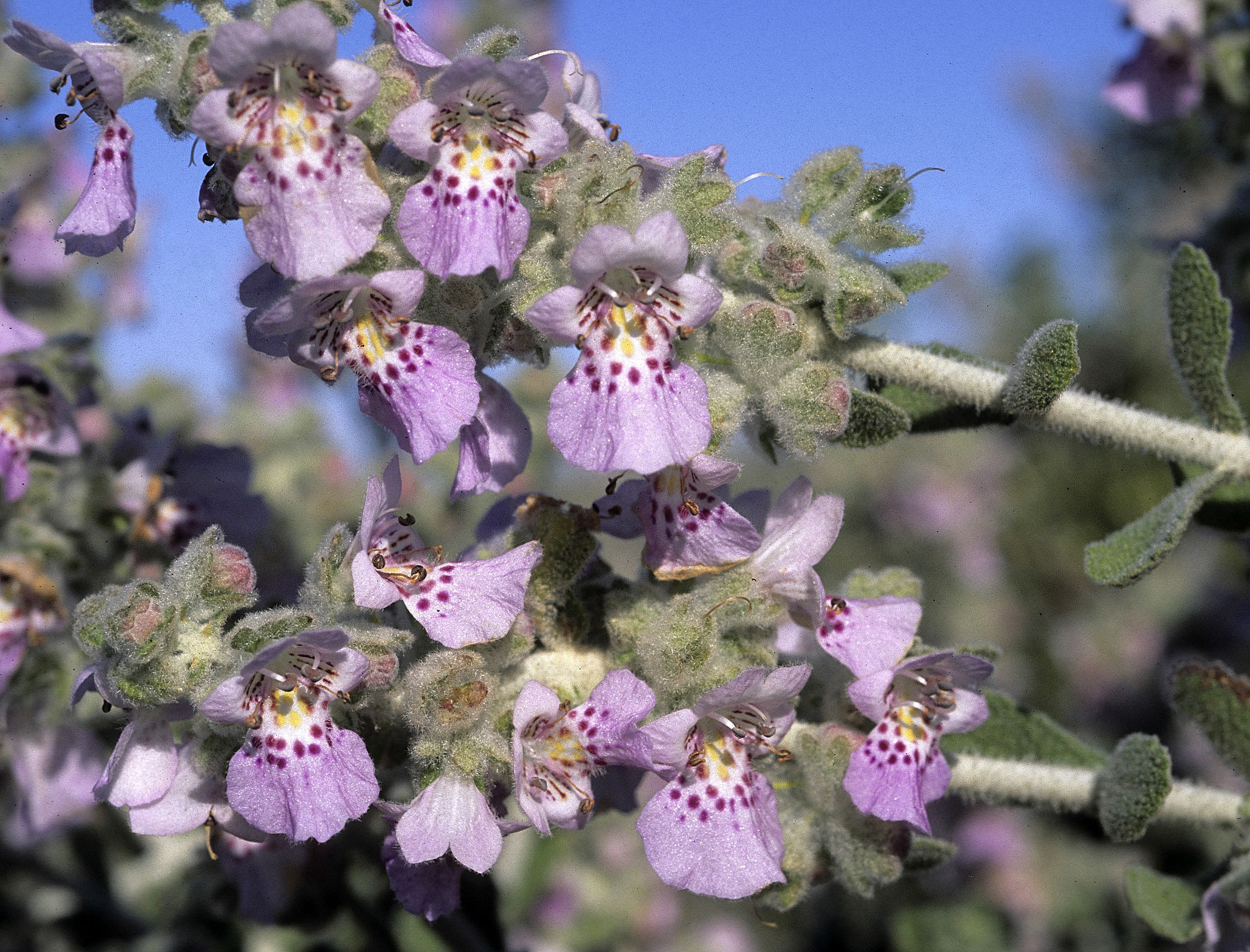
- Quoya atriplicina in Francois Peron National Park

Scientific classification
- Kingdom: Plantae
- Clade: Tracheophytes
- Clade: Angiosperms
- Clade: Eudicots
- Clade: Asterids
- Order: Lamiales
- Family: Lamiaceae
- Genus: Quoya
- Species: Q. atriplicina

Binomial name
- Quoya atriplicina (F.Muell.) B.J.Conn & Henwood
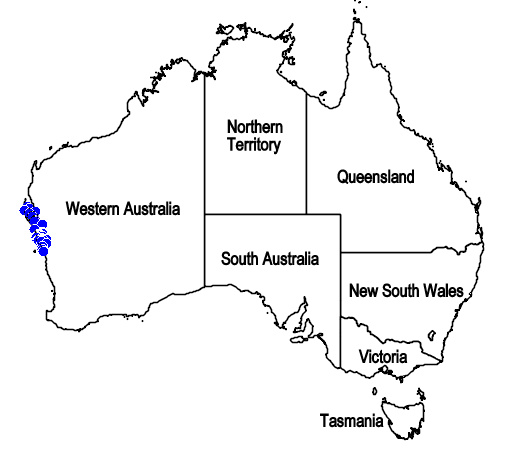
- Occurrence data from ALA

Synonyms
- Pityrodia atriplicina (F.Muell.) Benth.

= Quoya atriplicina =

Saltbush foxglove

Species of flowering plant

Quoya atriplicina, commonly known as saltbush foxglove, is a flowering plant in the mint family Lamiaceae and is endemic to Western Australia. It is a bushy shrub with its branches and leaves densely covered with a layer of hairs, giving them a greyish appearance. The leaves are broad-elliptic to almost circular in shape and the tube-shaped flowers are pink with purple spots inside.

== Description ==
Quoya atriplicina is a shrub with many branches, growing to a height of 1–2.5 m (3–8 ft) and which has its branches densely covered short, greyish hairs. The leaves are broadly elliptic to almost round, 1–2.5 cm (0.4–1 in) long and wide with the veins often hidden by the covering of short, ash-coloured hairs.

The flowers are arranged in the upper leaf axils, usually in a short, broad leafy panicle with 3 to 7 flowers on a stalk 2–4 mm (0.08–0.2 in) long and densely covered with ash-coloured hairs. The flowers are surrounded by bracts and bracteoles which are hairy on the outer surface and glabrous on the inside. The five sepals are joined to form an egg-shaped or top-shaped tube, 6–8 mm (0.2–0.3 in) long, with egg-shaped lobes on the end, 3–5 mm (0.1–0.2 in) long. The sepal tube is densely hairy on the outside and glabrous on the inside. The petals are pink with purple spots in the throat, 15–25 mm (0.6–1 in) long, forming a tube with a wide opening and five short broad lobes. The lowest lobe is very broad, more or less circular and twice as large as the others. The outside of the petal tube is hairy, although not so hairy as the sepals, and glabrous inside apart from a ring of hairs around the ovary. The four stamens are about the same length as the tube, one pair shorter than the other. Flowering occurs mainly from May to October or November and is followed by fruit which is oval in shape, 3–4 mm (0.1–0.2 in) long and densely hairy with the sepals remaining attached.

== Taxonomy and naming ==
This species was first formally described in 1859 by Ferdinand von Mueller who gave it the name Chloanthes atriplicina. The description was published in Fragmenta phytographiae Australiae from a specimen collected by Augustus Oldfield near the Murchison River. In 1870, George Bentham changed the name to Pityrodia atriplicina but in 2011, Barry Conn and Murray Henwood changed it back to Quoya atriplicina and published the change in Australian Systematic Botany. The specific epithet (atriplicina) is derived from the name of the saltbush genus, Atriplex.

== Distribution and habitat ==
Saltbush foxglove grows in sand on sandplains mainly between Geraldton and Shark Bay in the Carnarvon, Geraldton Sandplains and Yalgoo biogeographic regions.

== Conservation ==
Quoya atriplicina is classified as "not threatened" by the Western Australian Government Department of Parks and Wildlife.
