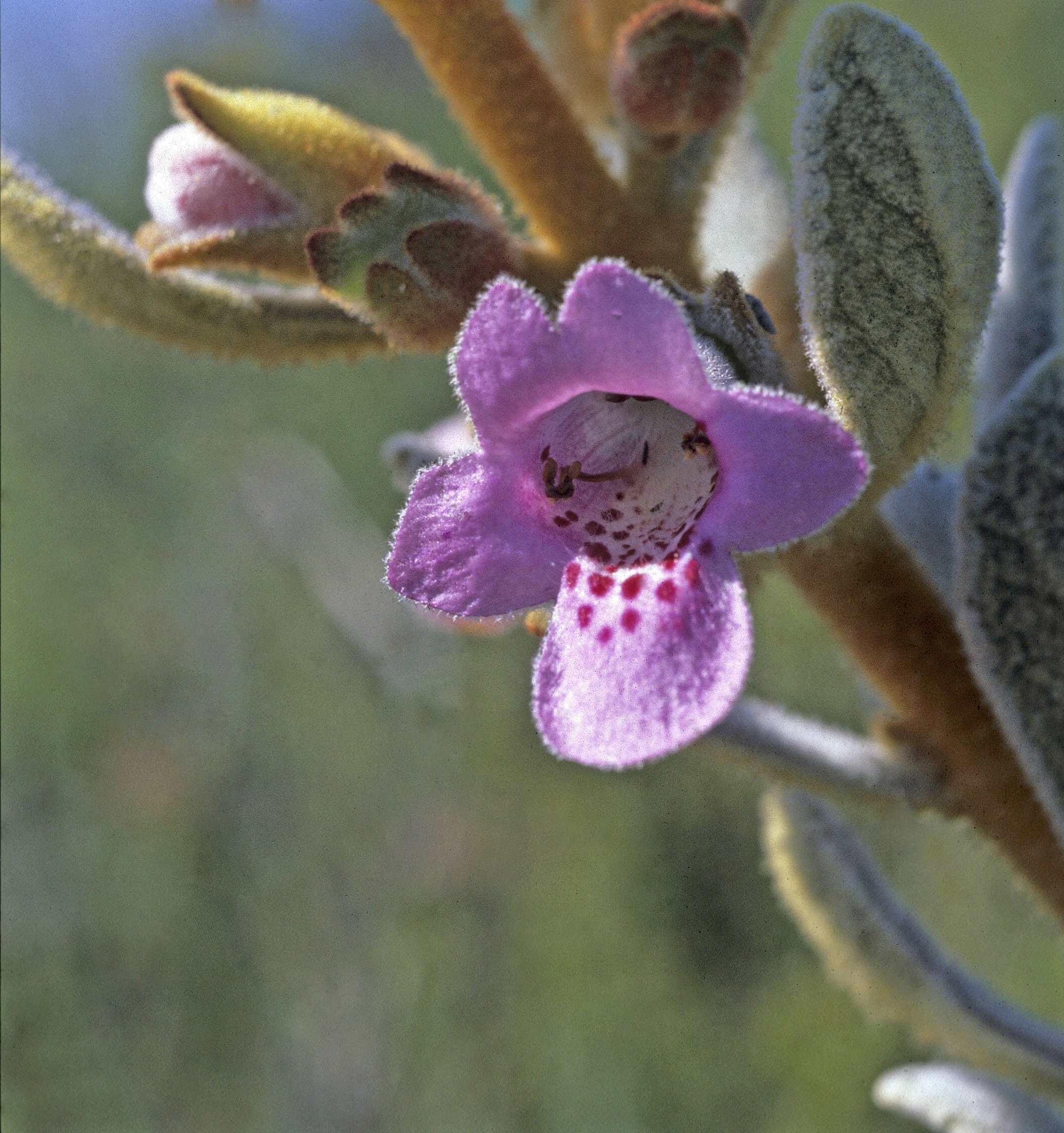
- In Kalbarri National Park

Scientific classification
- Kingdom: Plantae
- Clade: Tracheophytes
- Clade: Angiosperms
- Clade: Eudicots
- Clade: Asterids
- Order: Lamiales
- Family: Lamiaceae
- Genus: Quoya
- Species: Q. oldfieldii

Binomial name
- Quoya oldfieldii (F.Muell.) B.J.Conn & Henwood
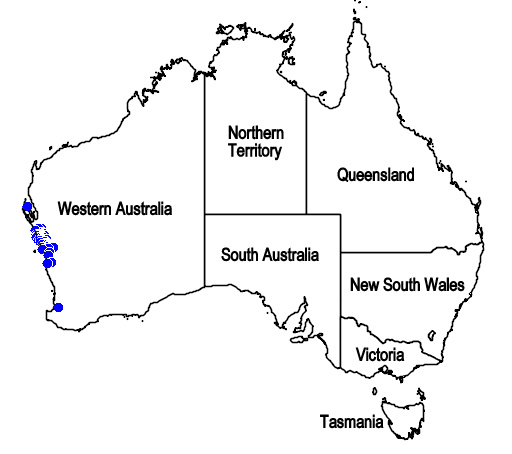
- Occurrence data from ALA

Synonyms
- Chloanthes oldfieldii F.Muell.; Pityrodia oldfieldii (F.Muell.) Benth.

= Quoya oldfieldii =

Oldfield's foxglove

Species of flowering plant

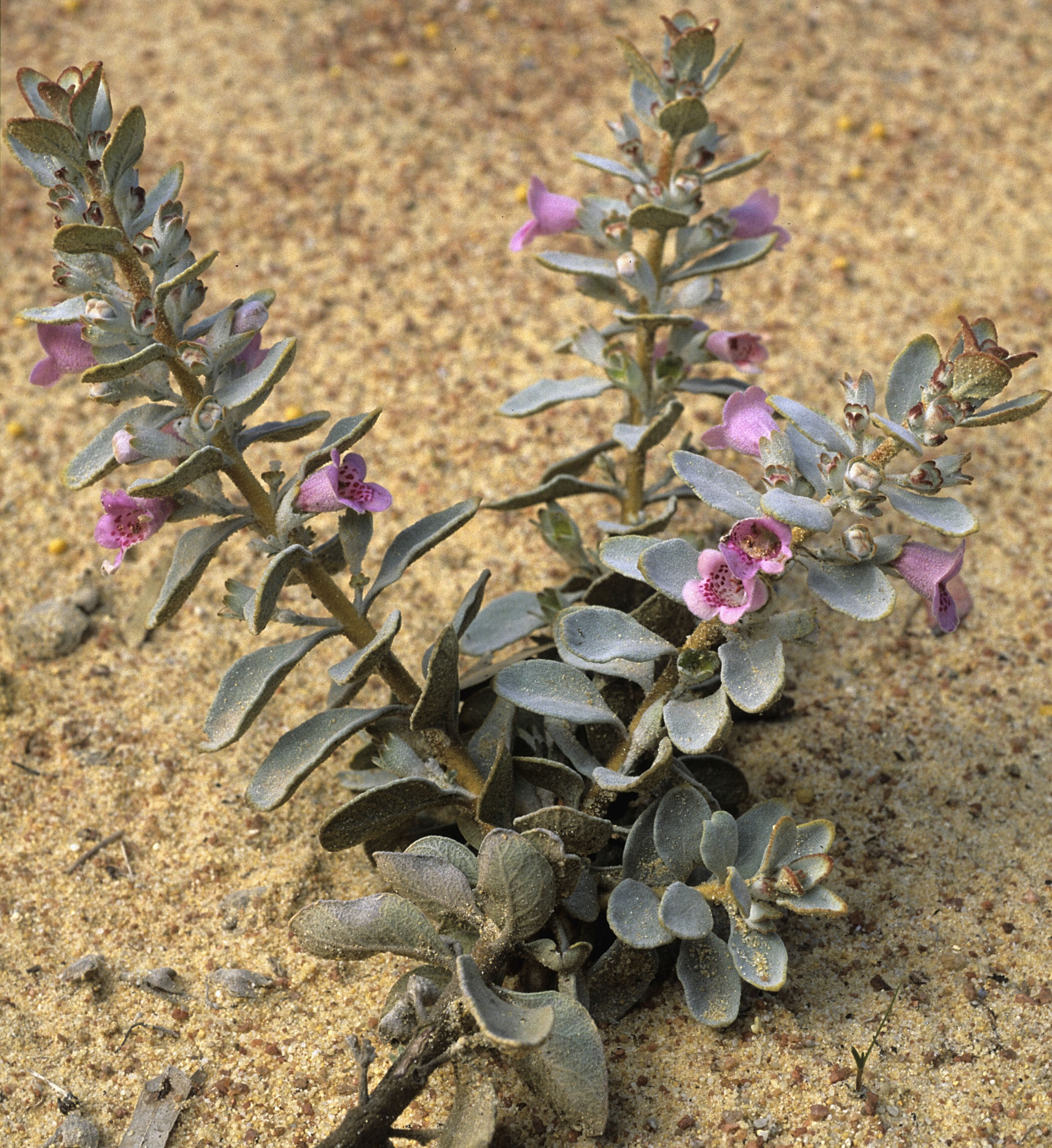
Habit in Kings Park, Perth

Quoya oldfieldii, commonly known as Oldfield's foxglove, is a flowering plant in the mint family Lamiaceae and is endemic to the south-west of Western Australia. It is an erect shrub with its branches and leaves densely covered with a layer of brownish hairs. The leaves are egg-shaped and the tube-shaped flowers are pink with purple spots inside.

== Description ==
Quoya oldfieldii is an erect shrub, growing to a height of 0.5–1.5 m (2–5 ft) and which has its branches densely covered reddish to dark brown hairs, fading to pale brown on older branches. The leaves are egg-shaped with the narrower end towards the base, 2–4.5 cm (0.8–2 in) long, 1.5–2.5 cm (0.6–1 in) wide, densely covered with woolly hairs, greyish green on the top and yellowish green on the lower side.

The flowers are arranged in the upper leaf axils, usually in a short, broad leafy group with 3 to 7 flowers on a densely hairy stalk 1–2 cm (0.4–0.8 in) long. The flowers are surrounded by bracts and bracteoles which are hairy on the outer surface and glabrous on the inside. The five sepals are 8–10 mm (0.3–0.4 in) long and joined for about half their length into a tube. The sepal tube and lobes are densely hairy on the outside and mostly glabrous inside. The five petals are joined to form a tube 18–23 mm (0.7–0.9 in) long and which is pale pink with purple dots inside and has five lobes on its end. The lowest lobe is very broad, more or less circular and twice as large as the others. The outside of the petal tube is hairy, although not so hairy as the sepals, and glabrous inside apart from a ring of hairs around the ovary. The four stamens are about the same length as the tube, one pair shorter than the other. Flowering occurs mainly from May to October or November and is followed by oval fruit, 3–4 mm (0.12–0.16 in) long and densely hairy with the sepals remaining attached. Flowering occurs mainly from June to November or December and is followed by hairy, oval or almost spherical fruit with the sepals attached.

== Taxonomy and naming ==
This species was first formally described in 1859 by Ferdinand von Mueller who gave it the name Chloanthes oldfieldii. The description was published in Fragmenta phytographiae Australiae from a specimen collected by Augustus Oldfield near the Murchison River. In 2011, Barry Conn and Murray Henwood changed the name to Quoya oldfieldii and published the change in Australian Systematic Botany. The specific epithet (oldfieldii) honours the collector of the type specimen.

== Distribution and habitat ==
Oldfield's foxglove grows in sand and gravelly soil on sandplains mainly between Geraldton and Shark Bay in the Geraldton Sandplains and Yalgoo biogeographic regions.

== Conservation ==
Quoya oldfieldii is classified as "not threatened" by the Western Australian Government Department of Parks and Wildlife.
