= Calothamnus glaber =

- In Kalbarri National Park

Scientific classification
- Kingdom: Plantae
- Clade: Tracheophytes
- Clade: Angiosperms
- Clade: Eudicots
- Clade: Rosids
- Order: Myrtales
- Family: Myrtaceae
- Genus: Calothamnus
- Species: C. glaber

Binomial name
- Calothamnus glaber (Benth.) Hawkeswood ex A.S.George

Synonyms
- Calothamnus blepharospermus var. glaber Benth.; Calothamnus glaber Paczk. & A.R.Chapm. nom. inval.; Calothamnus glaber (Benth.) Hawkeswood ms.; Melaleuca glabra (Benth.) Craven & R.D.Edwards

Species of flowering plant

Calothamnus glaber is a plant in the myrtle family, Myrtaceae and is endemic to near-coastal areas in the south-west of Western Australia. (In 2014 Craven, Edwards and Cowley proposed that the species be renamed Melaleuca glabra.) It is a shrub, similar to Calothamnus blepharospermus, but its leaves are slightly longer and narrower and the parts of its flowers are glabrous.

== Description ==
Calothamnus glaber is a shrub growing to a height of 2–3 metres (7–10 ft) with leaves 50–75 millimetres (2.0–3.0 in) in length, 6 millimetres (0.2 in) wide and very narrow egg-shaped with the narrow end towards the base, the other end tapering to a sharp point.

The flowers are bright red and arranged in small clusters amongst the older leaves and mostly on one side of the stem. The outer edge of the flower cup (the hypanthium) and the sepals are glabrous. The petals are 2.5–3 millimetres (0.098–0.12 in) long and have a jagged edge. The stamens are arranged in claw-like bundles 22–25 millimetres (0.87–0.98 in) long. Flowering is followed by fruits which are woody capsules, 5–6 millimetres (0.20–0.24 in) long.

== Taxonomy and naming ==
Calothamnus blepharosperma var. glabra was first formally described in 1867 by George Bentham in his Flora Australiensis. Trevor Hawkeswood annotated the herbarium sheets and Alex George raised the variety to species status in 2010. The specific epithet glaber is a Latin word meaning without hair, smooth.

== Distribution ==
Calothamnus glaber occurs in the Avon Wheatbelt, Carnarvon, Geraldton Sandplains, Swan Coastal Plain and Yalgoo biogeographic regions.

== Conservation ==
Calothamnus glaber is classified as "not threatened" by the Western Australian Government Department of Parks and Wildlife.
