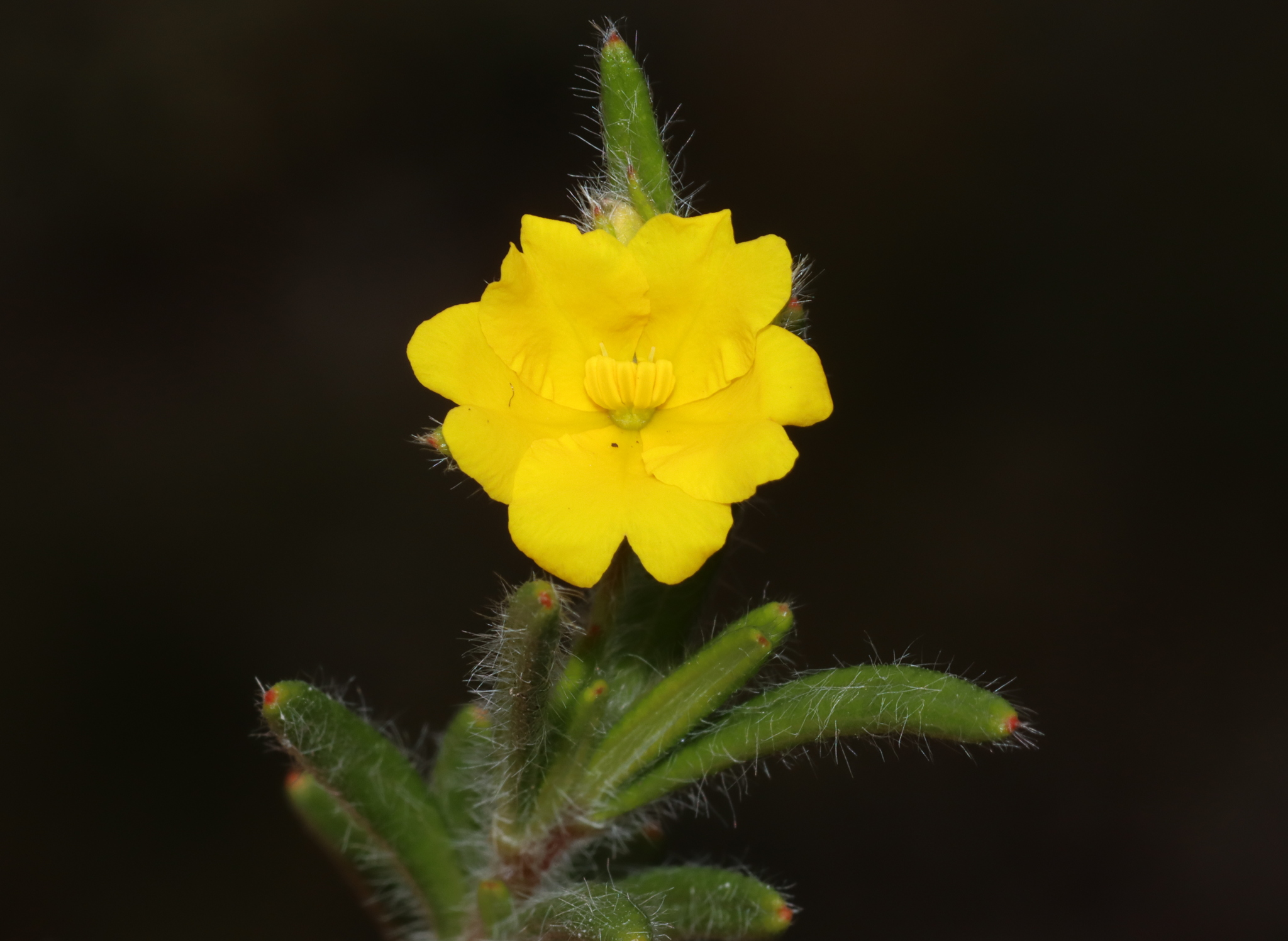

Scientific classification
- Kingdom: Plantae
- Clade: Tracheophytes
- Clade: Angiosperms
- Clade: Eudicots
- Order: Dilleniales
- Family: Dilleniaceae
- Genus: Hibbertia
- Species: H. polystachya

Binomial name
- Hibbertia polystachya Benth.

= Hibbertia polystachya =

Species of plant

Hibbertia polystachya is a species of flowering plant in the family Dilleniaceae and is endemic to the south-west of Western Australia. It is an erect to sprawling or straggly shrub with narrow elliptic to linear leaves and yellow flowers arranged in groups of up to five with about ten stamens and a similar number of staminodes, arranged on one side of two hairy carpels.

== Description ==
Hibbertia polystachya is an erect to sprawling or straggly shrub that typically grows to a height of up to 30 cm (12 in), the older branches with grey, papery bark. The leaves are narrow elliptic to linear, 5–20 mm (0.20–0.79 in) long and 0.8–3 mm (0.031–0.118 in) wide with the edges rolled under. The flowers are arranged in groups of up to five with narrow egg-shaped to linear bracts 3–6 mm (0.12–0.24 in) long at the base. The five sepals are hairy and egg-shaped, 7–10 mm (0.28–0.39 in) long, the inner lobes broader and less hairy than the outer lobes. The five petals are broadly egg-shaped with the narrower end towards the base, yellow, 7.5–12 mm (0.30–0.47 in) long and there are about ten stamens fused at the base, and a similar number of staminodes, arranged on one side of two hairy carpels, each carpel two ovules.

== Taxonomy ==
Hibbertia polystachya was first formally described in 1863 by George Bentham in Flora Australiensis from specimens collected by James Drummond in the Swan River Colony and Augustus Oldfield near the Blackwood River. The specific epithet (polystachya) means "many flower spikes".

== Distribution and habitat ==
This hibbertia grows in woodland, mallee and heathland from near Mingenew to Katanning and Kojonup in the Avon Wheatbelt, Geraldton Sandplains, Jarrah Forest, Mallee and Swan Coastal Plain biogeographic regions of south-western Western Australia.

== Conservation status ==
Hibbertia polystachya is classified as "not threatened" by the Western Australian Government Department of Parks and Wildlife.

== See also ==
- List of Hibbertia species
