= Goodenia corynocarpa =

Scientific classification
- Kingdom: Plantae
- Clade: Tracheophytes
- Clade: Angiosperms
- Clade: Eudicots
- Clade: Asterids
- Order: Asterales
- Family: Goodeniaceae
- Genus: Goodenia
- Species: G. corynocarpa

Binomial name
- Goodenia corynocarpa F.Muell.

Species of plant

Goodenia corynocarpa is a species of flowering plant in the family Goodeniaceae and endemic to near-coastal areas in the west of Western Australia. It is a herb with linear to elliptic leaves at the base of the plant, and racemes of yellow flowers.

== Description ==
Goodenia corynocarpa is an erect herb that typically grows to a height of 30–60 cm (12–24 in). The leaves are linear to elliptic, 60–90 mm (2.4–3.5 in) long, 4–10 mm (0.16–0.39 in) wide and arranged at the base of the plant. The flowers are arranged in racemes up to 300 mm (12 in) long with leaf-like bracts at the base, each flower on a pedicel up to 30 mm (1.2 in) long. The sepals are lance-shaped, 3–4 mm (0.12–0.16 in) long and the corolla is yellow and 12–15 mm (0.47–0.59 in) long. The lower lobes of the corolla are 4–6 mm (0.16–0.24 in) long with wings about 2 mm (0.079 in) wide. Flowering has been observed in August and the fruit is a narrow cylindrical capsule 12–26 mm (0.47–1.02 in) long.

== Taxonomy and naming ==
Goodenia corynocarpa was first formally described in 1860 by Ferdinand von Mueller in Fragmenta Phytographiae Australiae from material collected near the Murchison River by Augustus Oldfield. The specific epithet (corynocarpa) means "club-fruited".

== Distribution and habitat ==
This goodenia grows on grassy plains in near-coastal areas of Western Australia between Onslow and the Murchison River.

== Conservation status ==
Goddenia corynocarpa is classified as "not threatened" by the Department of Environment and Conservation (Western Australia).
