= Dasymalla chorisepala =

Conservation status
- Priority Three — Poorly Known Taxa (DEC)

Scientific classification
- Kingdom: Plantae
- Clade: Embryophytes
- Clade: Tracheophytes
- Clade: Spermatophytes
- Clade: Angiosperms
- Clade: Eudicots
- Clade: Asterids
- Order: Lamiales
- Family: Lamiaceae
- Genus: Dasymalla
- Species: D. chorisepala

Binomial name
- Dasymalla chorisepala (Munir) B.J.Conn & Henwood

Synonyms
- Pityrodia chorisepala Munir; Pityrodia ovata Munir

Species of flowering plant

Dasymalla chorisepala is a flowering plant in the mint family Lamiaceae and is endemic to Western Australia and the Northern Territory. It is a small shrub with its branches and leaves densely covered with hairs. The leaves are stalkless, egg-shaped and covered with yellowish hairs while the flowers are small, tube-shaped and white.

== Description ==
Dasymalla terminalis is a rigid shrub which grows to a height of 0.9 m (3 ft) with its branches densely covered with short, ash-coloured hairs. The younger branches and leaves are covered with a more yellowish layer of hairs. The leaves are egg-shaped, 7–15 mm (0.3–0.6 in) long, 3–5.5 cm (1–2 in) wide, with those near the ends of the branches crowded together.

The flowers are white and arranged in upper leaf axils in groups of up to three on a stalk 3–5 mm (0.1–0.2 in) long and covered with short hairs. The flowers are surrounded by leafy bracts and bracteoles which are covered with glandular hairs, especially on their edges. The five sepals are 4–7 mm (0.2–0.3 in) long, linear in shape with hairy margins and joined to form a short tube near the base. The five petals are joined to form a tube 6–8 mm (0.2–0.3 in) long and mostly glabrous except for a dense hairy ring inside the tube, below the stamens. There are five lobes on the end of the petal tube, the lower one elliptic to almost round in shape and slightly larger than the other four lobes.

== Taxonomy and naming ==
This species was first formally described in 1979 by Ahmad Abid Munir who gave it the name Pityrodia chorisepala and published the description in Journal of the Adelaide Botanic Garden. In 2011, Barry Conn, Murray Henwood and Nicola Streiber resurrected the genus Dasymalla and transferred this species to it as Dasymalla chorisepala. The specific epithet (chorisepala) is derived from Greek words meaning "separate" and "sepalled".

== Distribution ==
Dasymalla chorisepala occurs in isolated populations in Western Australia and in the Northern Territory near its border with Western Australia. In Western Australia it grows in red sand on dunes and spinifex plains in the Great Sandy Desert biogeographic region and in the Northern Territory south of Mongrel Downs and west of Sandy Blight Junction in the Tanami Desert biogeographic region.

== Conservation ==
Dasymalla chorisepala is classified as "Priority Three" by the Government of Western Australia Department of Parks and Wildlife meaning that it is poorly known and known from only a few locations but is not under imminent threat.
