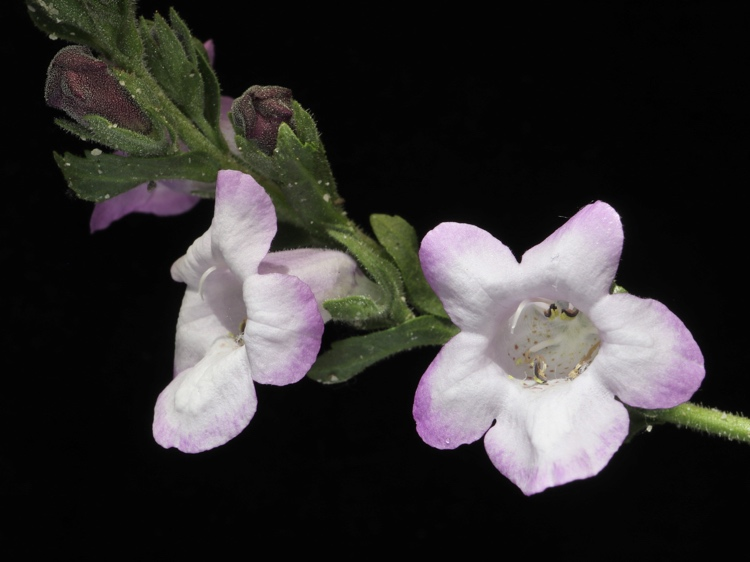
- In the Australian National Botanic Gardens

Scientific classification
- Kingdom: Plantae
- Clade: Embryophytes
- Clade: Tracheophytes
- Clade: Spermatophytes
- Clade: Angiosperms
- Clade: Eudicots
- Clade: Asterids
- Order: Lamiales
- Family: Lamiaceae
- Genus: Dasymalla
- Species: D. teckiana

Binomial name
- Dasymalla teckiana (F.Muell.) B.J.Conn & Henwood

Synonyms
- Pityrodia teckiana (F.Muell.) Prtiz.; Chloanthes teckiana F.Muell.

= Dasymalla teckiana =

Species of flowering plant

Dasymalla teckiana is a flowering plant in the mint family Lamiaceae and is endemic to Western Australia. It is a small, openly branched, sticky shrub with mauve and white, bugle-shaped flowers.

== Description ==
Dasymalla teckiana is an openly branched shrub which grows to a height of 0.3–0.9 m (1–3 ft) and which is sticky due to the glandular hairs which cover its branches. Its leaves are stalkless, have their base partly wrapped around the stem, oval to egg-shaped, 0.8–2.5 cm (0.3–1 in) long and 5–10 mm (0.2–0.4 in) wide. They are sticky, glabrous and green with a few blunt teeth along their edges near the ends.

The flowers are white and mauve, purple, lilac or violet and are usually arranged singly in upper leaf axils on a stalk 1–3 mm (0.04–0.1 in) long and covered with glandular hairs. The flowers are surrounded by green, leafy, oblong bracts, 4–12 mm (0.2–0.5 in) long and green, hairy, glandular bracteoles 2.5–5 mm (0.1–0.2 in) long. The five sepals are 5–8 mm (0.2–0.3 in) long and sticky with linear lobes and joined to form a short tube near their bases. The five petals are joined to form a tube 6–8 mm (0.2–0.3 in) long with a few hairs on the outside and glabrous inside except for a densely hairy ring around the ovary. There are five lobes on the end of the petal tube, the lower one elliptic to almost round and slightly larger than the other four lobes.

== Taxonomy and naming ==
This species was first formally described in 1889 by Ferdinand von Mueller who gave it the name Chloanthes teckiana and published the description in the Victorian Naturalist. The type specimen was collected by John Forrest. In 1904, Georg August Pritzel changed the name to Pityrodia teckiana and in 2011, Barry Conn, Murray Henwood and Nicola Streiber changed it to Dasymalla teckiana. The specific epithet (teckiana) honours Francis, Duke of Teck.

== Distribution ==
Dasymalla teckiana occurs in the south-west of Western Australia, mostly north of the Great Eastern Highway, as far east as Kalgoorlie in the Avon Wheatbelt, Coolgardie, Dampierland and Swan Coastal Plain biogeographic regions growing in a range of soils near granite outcrops.

== Conservation ==
Dasymalla teckiana is classified as "not threatened" by the Government of Western Australia Department of Parks and Wildlife
