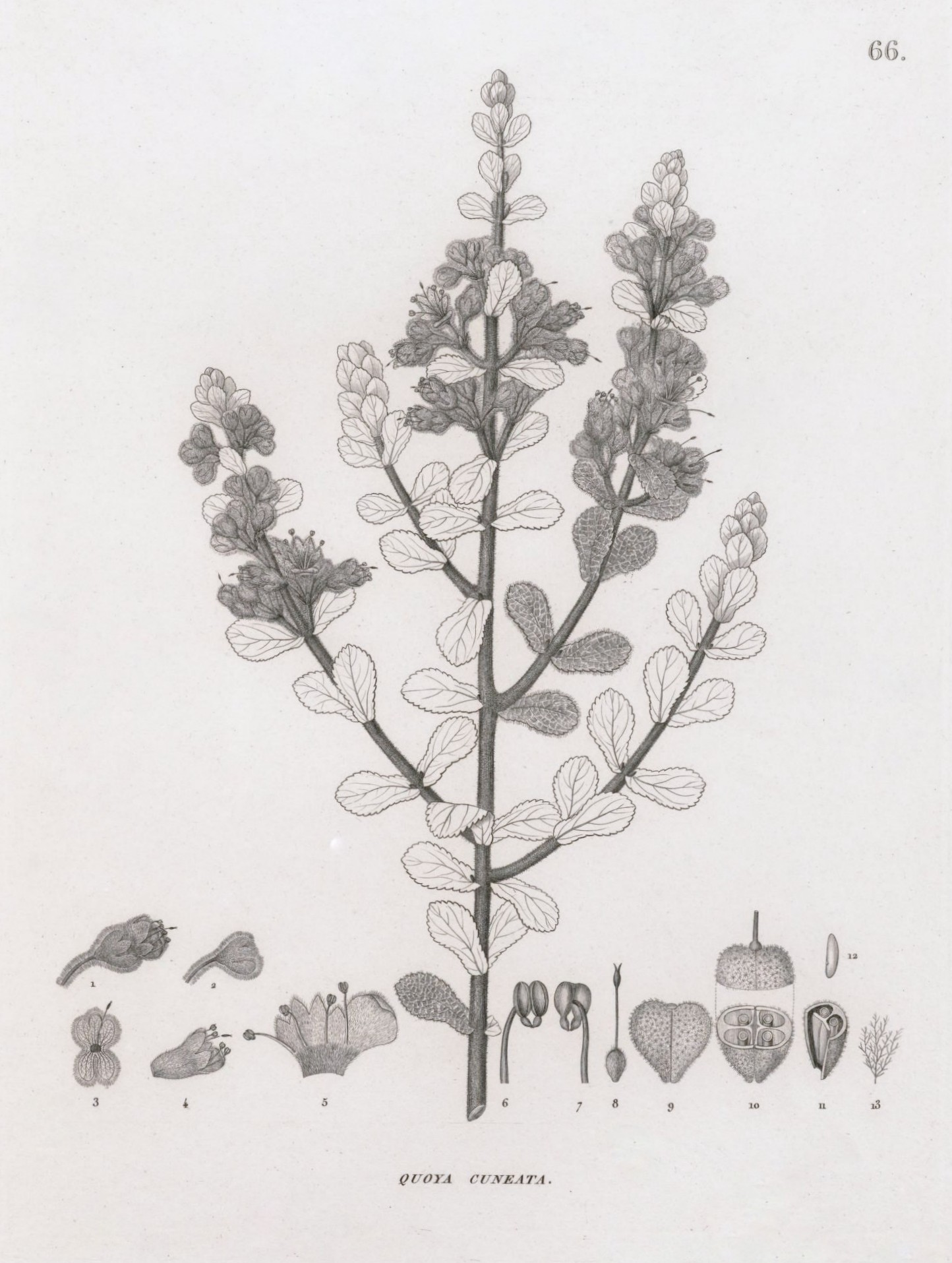
- Quoya cuneata from Bougainville's journal Voyage autour du monde

Scientific classification
- Kingdom: Plantae
- Clade: Tracheophytes
- Clade: Angiosperms
- Clade: Eudicots
- Clade: Asterids
- Order: Lamiales
- Family: Lamiaceae
- Genus: Quoya
- Species: Q. cuneata

Binomial name
- Quoya cuneata Gaudich.

Synonyms
- Chloanthes oldfieldii F.Muell.; Pityrodia cuneata (Gaudich.) Benth.; Chloanthes cuneata (Gaudich.) F.Muell.; Pityrodia cuneata (Gaudich.) Benth.

= Quoya cuneata =

Species of flowering plant

Quoya cuneata is a flowering plant in the mint family Lamiaceae and is endemic to the south-west of Western Australia. It is a spreading shrub with its branches and leaves covered with a layer of woolly, pale white or brownish hairs. The flowers are blue at first but become white with purple spots inside the petal tube.

== Description ==
Quoya cuneata is a spreading shrub which grows to a height of 0.6–3.5 m (2–10 ft) and which has its branches densely covered with pale white or brownish hairs. The leaves are egg-shaped or wedge-shaped, 8–15 mm (0.3–0.6 in) long and 5–7 mm (0.2–0.3 in) wide and lack a stalk. Both surfaces of the leaf are blistered and covered with woolly hairs.

The flowers are arranged singly, sometimes in groups of up to three in leaf axils on woolly stalks 3–5 mm (0.1–0.2 in) long. The flowers are surrounded by bracts and bracteoles which are hairy on the outer surface and glabrous on the inside. The five sepals are 5–6 mm (0.20–0.24 in) long, with the egg-shaped lobes in two groups, five in one, two in the other with the upper three-lobed "lip" larger than the lower one. The sepals are densely woolly on the outside and mostly glabrous on the inside. The petals are 8–12 mm (0.3–0.5 in) long, forming a bell-shaped tube with five lobes. The petal tube is blue at first but turns white with purple spots inside. The outside of the tube has short hairs and is mostly glabrous inside except for the large lower lip and a dense ring of hairs around the ovary. The lower central lobe is broad elliptic to almost round, 5–6 mm (0.20–0.24 in) long, 6–7 mm (0.2–0.3 in) wide and larger than the other four lobes. The four stamens extend a short distance beyond the end of the tube. Flowering occurs from August to November or December and is followed by the fruit which is oval-shaped to almost spherical, 2–3 mm (0.08–0.1 in) in diameter with the sepals remaining attached.

== Taxonomy and naming ==
This species was first formally described in 1828 by Charles Gaudichaud-Beaupré from a specimen collected in Shark Bay during the Bougainville expedition in the ships l'Uranie and la Physicienne from 1817 to 1820. The specific epithet (cuneata) is a Latin word meaning "wedge-shaped".

== Distribution and habitat ==
Quoya cuneata grows in red sand between the Murchison River and Shark Bay in the Carnarvon, Geraldton Sandplains, Murchison and Yalgoo biogeographic regions.

== Conservation ==
Quoya cuneata is classified as "not threatened" by the Western Australian Government Department of Parks and Wildlife.
