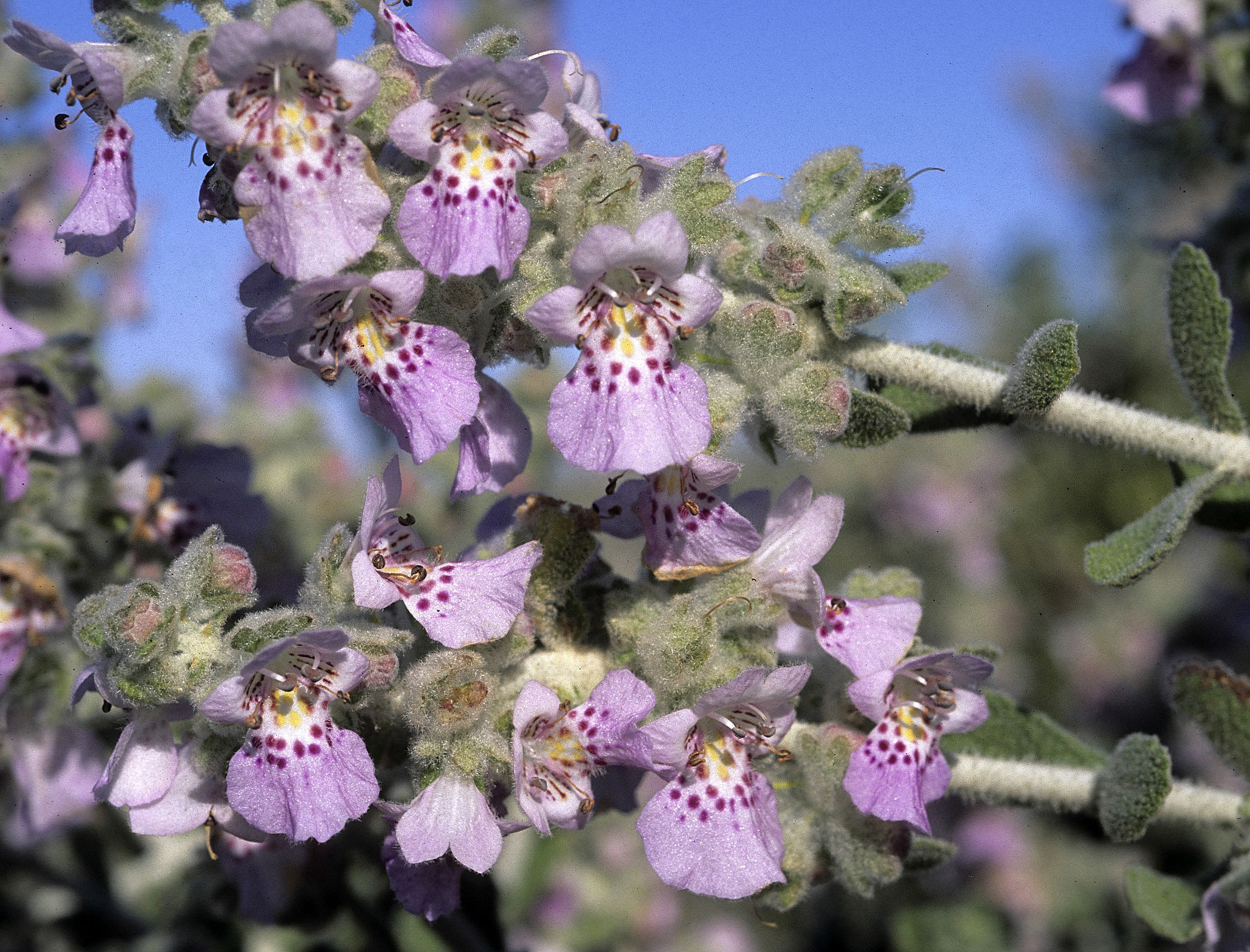
- Quoya atriplicina in Francois Peron National Park

Scientific classification
- Kingdom: Plantae
- Clade: Embryophytes
- Clade: Tracheophytes
- Clade: Spermatophytes
- Clade: Angiosperms
- Clade: Eudicots
- Clade: Asterids
- Order: Lamiales
- Family: Lamiaceae
- Subfamily: Prostantheroideae
- Genus: Quoya; Gaudich.

Species
- See text

= Quoya (plant) =

Genus of flowering plants

Quoya is a genus of flowering plants in family Lamiaceae and is endemic to Western Australia. Plants in this genus are shrubs with five petals joined to form a tube-shaped flower with four stamens of unequal lengths.

== Description ==
Plants in the genus Quoya are evergreen shrubs densely covered with woolly hairs. The leaves are simple, egg-shaped to almost circular, arranged in opposite pairs and covered with branched hairs. The flowers are arranged in groups of 3 to 7, often forming short spikes and exhibit left-right symmetry. There are five sepals which are joined at their base, forming a short tube and five petals forming a straight or slightly curved tube with five lobes on the end, the upper lobes shorter than the lower ones. There are four stamens with the lower pair having reduced fertility. The fruit is a drupe with the sepals remaining attached.

== Taxonomy and naming ==
The genus was first described by Charles Gaudichaud-Beaupré in 1828 and the description was published in his book Voyage Autour du Monde ... sur les Corvettes de S.M. l'Uranie et la Physicienne. The type species is Quoya cuneata. The name of the genus (Quoya) honours the surgeon, zoologist and friend of Gaudichaud-Beaupré, Jean René Constant Quoy.

The species of Quoya are:

- Quoya atriplicina (F.Muell.) B.J.Conn & M.J.Henwood
- Quoya cuneata Gaudich.
- Quoya dilatata (F.Muell.) B.J.Conn & M.J.Henwood
- Quoya loxocarpa (F.Muell.) B.J.Conn & M.J.Henwood
- Quoya oldfieldii F.Muell.
- Quoya paniculata F.Muell.
- Quoya verbascina (F.Muell.) B.J.Conn & M.J.Henwood

== Distribution ==
All species of Quoya are endemic to Western Australia.
