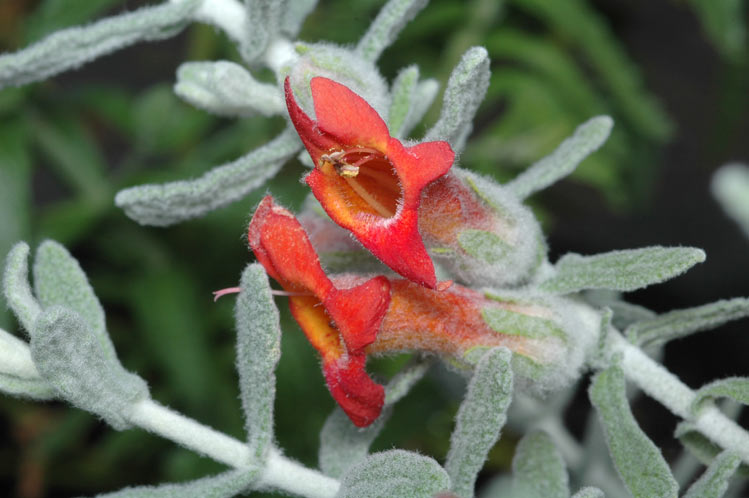

Scientific classification
- Kingdom: Plantae
- Clade: Tracheophytes
- Clade: Angiosperms
- Clade: Eudicots
- Clade: Asterids
- Order: Lamiales
- Family: Lamiaceae
- Genus: Quoya
- Species: Q. dilatata

Binomial name
- Quoya dilatata (F.Muell.) B.J.Conn & Henwood
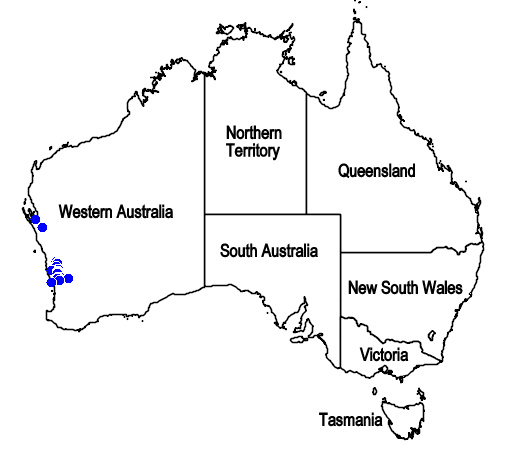

Synonyms
- Pityrodia dilatata (F.Muell.) Benth.; Chloanthes dilatata F.Muell.

= Quoya dilatata =

Species of flowering plant

Quoya dilatata is a flowering plant in the mint family Lamiaceae and is endemic to Western Australia. It is a low, spreading shrub with its branches and leaves densely covered with a layer of white, woolly hairs. The leaves are wrinkled or crinkly and the tube-shaped flowers are orange-red and hairy on the outside.

== Description ==
Quoya dilatata is a spreading shrub, growing to a height of 30–60 cm (10–20 in) and which has its branches and leaves densely covered with a layer of white, woolly hairs. The leaves are egg-shaped to spoon-shaped with the narrow end towards the base, 1.5–3 cm (0.6–1 in) long, 7–11 mm (0.3–0.4 in) wide. The upper surface is wrinkled or crinkly and the lower has a network of veins.

The flowers are usually solitary in the upper leaf axils, forming a long, leafy spike of flowers. Each flower has a thin, hairy stalk 2–4 mm (0.08–0.2 in) long and is surrounded by leaf-like bracts and bracteoles which are woolly-hairy on the lower surface and glabrous on the upper surface. The five sepals are 8–12 mm (0.3–0.5 in) long, spoon-shaped and joined at their bases to form a very short tube. The sepals are thin and thickly woolly-hairy on the outside and glabrous on the inside. The petals are orange-red in colour, 20–25 mm (0.8–1 in) long, forming a tube which gradually widens towards the five lobes on the end. The tube is densely hairy on the outside and glabrous inside, except for a ring of hairs around the ovary. The lowest petal lobe is much larger than the others, more or less egg-shaped, 5–7 mm (0.2–0.3 in) long, 4–6 mm (0.16–0.24 in) wide. The other four lobes are about equal in size, with two lobes erect and the two on each side of the end of the tube. The four stamens extend beyond the end of the petal tube, the lower pair longer than the other. Flowering occurs in September, October or November and is followed by fruit which is almost spherical, 2–3 mm (0.08–0.1 in) in diameter and densely hairy with the sepals remaining attached.

== Taxonomy and naming ==
This species was first formally described in 1868 by Ferdinand von Mueller who gave it the name Chloanthes dilatata. The description was published in Fragmenta phytographiae Australiae from a specimen collected by James Drummond near the Murchison River. In 1870, George Bentham changed the name to Pityrodia dilatata but in 2011, Barry Conn and Murray Henwood changed the name to Quoya dilatata and published the change in Australian Systematic Botany. The specific epithet (dilatata) is a Latin word meaning "spread" or "expanded".

== Distribution ==
Quoya dilatata mainly occurs between Perth and Carnamah but has also been found near Northam and Cowcowing, in the Avon Wheatbelt, Geraldton Sandplains, Jarrah Forest and Swan Coastal Plain biogeographic regions. The only known collection near the Murchison River was of the type specimen.

== Conservation ==
Quoya dilatata is classified as "not threatened" by the Western Australian Government Department of Parks and Wildlife.
