= Hakea oldfieldii =

Conservation status
- Priority Three — Poorly Known Taxa (DEC)

Scientific classification
- Kingdom: Plantae
- Clade: Tracheophytes
- Clade: Angiosperms
- Clade: Eudicots
- Order: Proteales
- Family: Proteaceae
- Genus: Hakea
- Species: H. oldfieldii

Binomial name
- Hakea oldfieldii Benth.
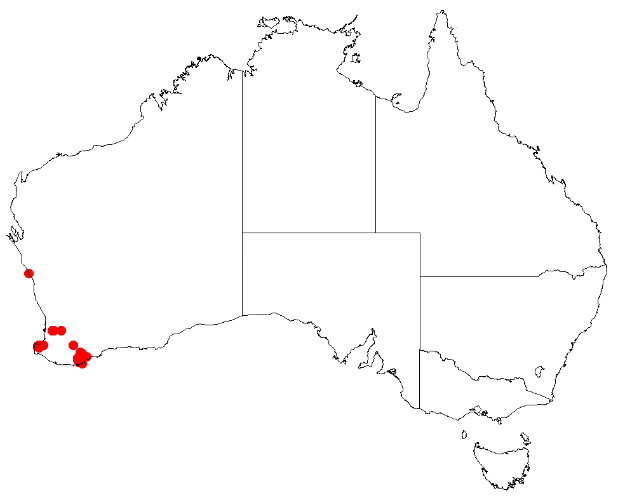
- Occurrence data from AVH

Species of shrub endemic to Australia

Hakea oldfieldii is a shrub of the family Proteaceae and is endemic to South West region of Western Australia. It has small white or cream-yellow flowers in profusion in spring.

== Description ==
Hakea oldfieldii is an open, straggling shrub with upright branches and growing to a height of 2.5 metres (8.2 ft). The smooth, needle-shaped leaves are more or less 20–50 mm (0.79–1.97 in) long and 1 mm (0.039 in) wide and grow alternately. The rigid dark green leaves may be curving or straight and end in a sharp point. The branchlets are smooth and covered with a bluish green powdery film. The inflorescence consists of 8–20 white or cream-yellow flowers in a raceme in the leaf axils on a smooth stalk 2–3 mm (0.079–0.118 in) long. The flowers appear in profusion and have an unpleasant scent. The over-lapping flower bracts are 3–6 mm (0.12–0.24 in) long, the pedicel 2.5–9.5 mm (0.098–0.374 in) long. The smooth, cream-white perianth 1.5–2.5 mm (0.059–0.098 in) long and the pistil 3–4.5 mm (0.12–0.18 in) long. The fruit are egg-shaped almost rounded, 16–23 mm (0.63–0.91 in) long, 8–10 mm (0.31–0.39 in) wide with an uneven surface, occasionally warty ending with two prominent horns about 5 mm (0.20 in) long. Flowering occurs from August to October.

== Taxonomy and naming ==
Hakea oldfieldii was first formally described by George Bentham in 1870 and published the description in Flora Australiensis. The specific epithet oldfieldii honours Augustus Frederick Oldfield who first discovered the species.

== Distribution and habitat ==
This species is found in the south-west from Bunbury and Busselton to the Stirling Range growing in well-drained rocky loam or clay over ironstone in winter-wet sites.

== Conservation status ==
Hakea oldfieldii is classified as "Priority Three" by the Government of Western Australia Department of Parks and Wildlife meaning that it is poorly known and known from only a few locations but is not under imminent threat.
