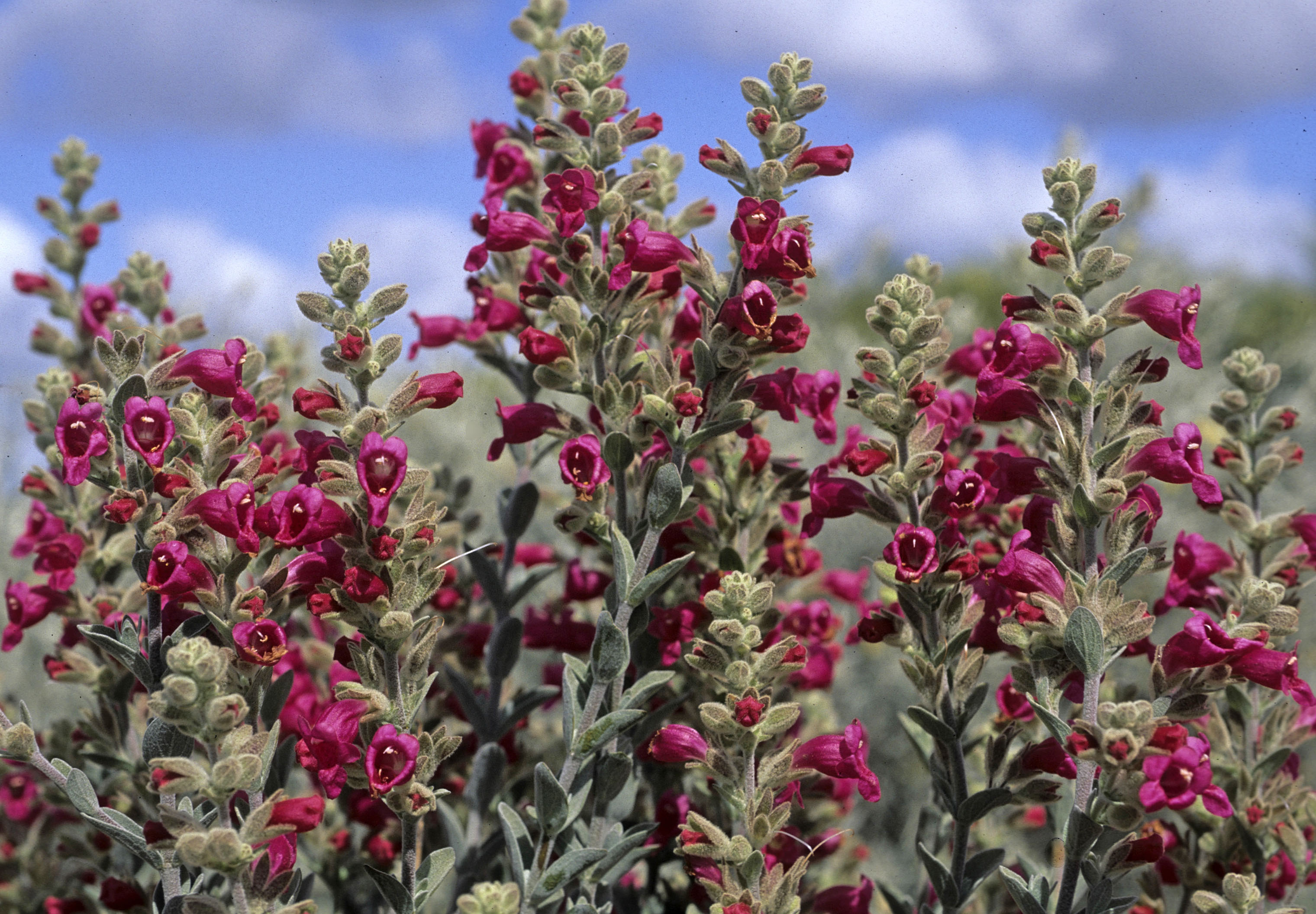
- Dasymalla terminalis near Mullewa

Scientific classification
- Kingdom: Plantae
- Clade: Embryophytes
- Clade: Tracheophytes
- Clade: Angiosperms
- Clade: Eudicots
- Clade: Asterids
- Order: Lamiales
- Family: Lamiaceae
- Subfamily: Prostantheroideae
- Genus: Dasymalla; Endl.

Species
- See text

= Dasymalla =

Genus of flowering plants

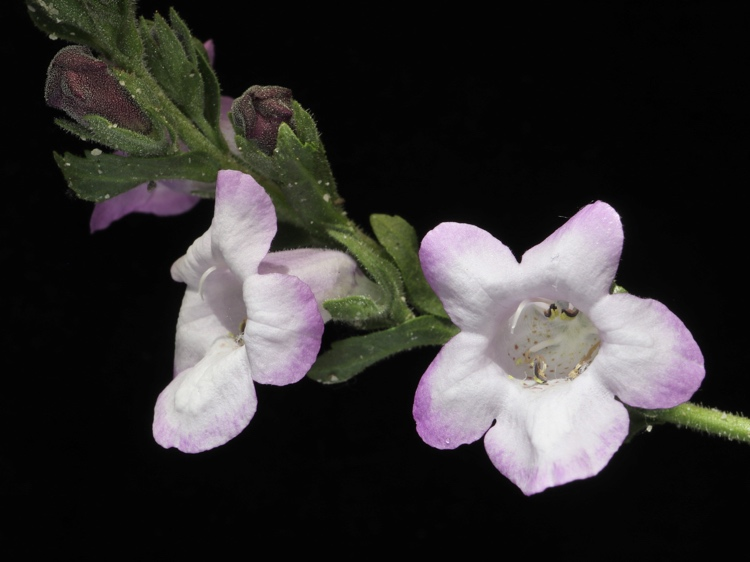
Dasymalla teckiana in the Australian National Botanic Gardens

Dasymalla is a genus of five species of flowering plants in the mint family, Lamiaceae and is endemic to Western Australia. Plants in this genus are woolly shrubs with five petals joined to form a tube-shaped flower with four stamens of unequal lengths. These species are similar to those in the genus Pityrodia except that the fruit does not release its seeds when mature.

== Description ==
Plants in the genus Dasymalla are evergreen shrubs densely covered with woolly hairs. The leaves are simple, egg-shaped, arranged in opposite pairs and covered with woolly hairs. The flowers are arranged singly in leaf axils and have five sepals which are joined at their base forming a short tube with five lobes. The five petals form a curved tube with five lobes on the end, the upper lobes shorter than the lower ones. There are four stamens with the lower pair shorter than the upper ones. The fruit does not release its seeds when mature and has a pronounced hump.

== Taxonomy and naming ==
The genus was first described by Stephan Endlicher in 1839 and the description was published in his book Novarum Stirpium Decades. In 1979, Ahmad Abid Munir transferred Dasymalla axillaris and Dasymalla terminalis described by Endlicher and Chloanthes teckiana described by Ferdinand von Mueller to Pityrodia. He also formally described Pityrodia chlorisepala and Pityrodia glutinosa. In 2011, Barry Conn, Murray Henwood and Nicola Streiber resurrected the genus Dasymalla and transferred these five species to it.

The names of five species of Dasymalla are accepted by the Australian Plant Census:

- Dasymalla axillaris Endl.
- Dasymalla chorisepala (Munir) B.J.Conn & M.J.Henwood
- Dasymalla glutinosa (Munir) B.J.Conn & M.J.Henwood
- Dasymalla teckiana (F.Muell.) B.J.Conn & M.J.Henwood
- Dasymalla terminalis Endl.

== Distribution ==
All species of Dasymalla are endemic to Western Australia, although D. chorisepala also occurs in the Northern Territory near its border with Western Australia.
