= Calothamnus blepharospermus =

Scientific classification
- Kingdom: Plantae
- Clade: Tracheophytes
- Clade: Angiosperms
- Clade: Eudicots
- Clade: Rosids
- Order: Myrtales
- Family: Myrtaceae
- Genus: Calothamnus
- Species: C. blepharospermus

Binomial name
- Calothamnus blepharospermus F.Muell.

Synonyms
- Calothamnus blepharosperma F.Muell. orth. var.; Calothamnus blepharospermus F.Muell. var. blepharospermus; Melaleuca blepharosperma (F.Muell.) Craven & R.D.Edwards

Species of flowering plant

Calothamnus blepharospermus is a plant in the myrtle family, Myrtaceae and is endemic to the west coast of Western Australia. It is an upright, spreading, bushy shrub with red flowers in summer. It grows in sandy soil in scrubby country called kwongan. (In 2014 Craven, Edwards and Cowley proposed that the species be renamed Melaleuca blepharosperma.)

== Description ==
Calothamnus blepharospermus is a shrub growing to a height of 2–3 metres (7–10 ft) with leaves 38–76 millimetres (1.5–3.0 in) in length and 5–7 millimetres (0.2–0.3 in) wide, very narrow egg-shaped with the narrow end towards the base, the other end tapering to a sharp point.

The flowers are red with the stamens arranged in five bundles, each 30–40 millimetres (1–2 in) long, the outer surface of the petals, the flower stalk and the hypanthium all densely hairy. Flowering occurs in January to February or in July and is followed by fruits which are woody capsules about 25 millimetres (1 in) long.

== Taxonomy and naming ==
Calothamnus blepharospermus was first formally described in 1862 by Ferdinand von Mueller from a specimen found "in desert near the Murchison River by Oldfield". The specific epithet blepharospermus is derived from the Greek words blepharon meaning "eyelid" and sperma, spermatos meaning "seed".

== Distribution and habitat ==
Calothamnus blepharospermus occurs in the Geraldton Sandplains, Yalgoo biogeographic regions where it grows in sand or sandy clay on plains and sand dunes.

== Conservation status ==
Calothamnus blepharospermus is classified as "not threatened" by the Western Australian Government Department of Parks and Wildlife.
