= Dasymalla glutinosa =

Conservation status
- Priority Three — Poorly Known Taxa (DEC)

Scientific classification
- Kingdom: Plantae
- Clade: Embryophytes
- Clade: Tracheophytes
- Clade: Spermatophytes
- Clade: Angiosperms
- Clade: Eudicots
- Clade: Asterids
- Order: Lamiales
- Family: Lamiaceae
- Genus: Dasymalla
- Species: D. glutinosa

Binomial name
- Dasymalla glutinosa (Munir) B.J.Conn & Henwood

Synonyms
- Pityrodia glutinosa Munir; Pityrodia glabra Munir

Species of flowering plant

Dasymalla glutinosa is a flowering plant in the mint family Lamiaceae and is endemic to Western Australia. It is a spreading, sticky shrub with glabrous branches, egg-shaped, stalkless leaves and small, white or cream-coloured, tube-shaped flowers.

== Description ==
Dasymalla glutinosa is a spreading shrub which grows to a height of 1–1.5 m (3–5 ft) with sticky but glabrous branches and leaves. The leaves are arranged in opposite pairs (that is, they are decussate), oblong to egg-shaped, 7–10 mm (0.3–0.4 in) long, 2–3 mm (0.08–0.1 in) wide with a blunt end.

The flowers are white or cream-coloured and arranged singly in upper leaf axils on a stalk 1–2 mm (0.04–0.08 in) long and sticky. The flowers are surrounded by leafy bracts 5–7 mm (0.2–0.3 in) long. The five sepals are 6–7 mm (0.2–0.3 in) long and sticky with lance-shaped lobes and joined to form a short tube for about half their length. The five petals are joined to form a tube 10–12 mm (0.4–0.5 in) long and mostly glabrous except for a densely hairy ring inside the tube. There are five lobes on the end of the petal tube, the lower one broad egg-shaped to almost round and slightly larger than the other four lobes.

== Taxonomy and naming ==
This species was first formally described in 1979 by Ahmad Abid Munir who gave it the name Pityrodia glutinosa and published the description in Journal of the Adelaide Botanic Garden. In 2011, Barry Conn Murray Henwood and Nicola Streiber resurrected the genus Dasymalla and transferred this species to it as Dasymalla glutinosa. The specific epithet (glutinosa) is a Latin word meaning "viscous" or "sticky".

== Distribution ==
Dasymalla glutinosa occurs between the Murchison River and Shark Bay in the Carnarvon, Geraldton Sandplains and Yalgoo biogeographic regions growing in sand on sandplains and dunes and in woodland.

== Conservation ==
Dasymalla glutinosa is classified as "Priority Three" by the Government of Western Australia Department of Parks and Wildlife meaning that it is poorly known and known from only a few locations but is not under imminent threat.
