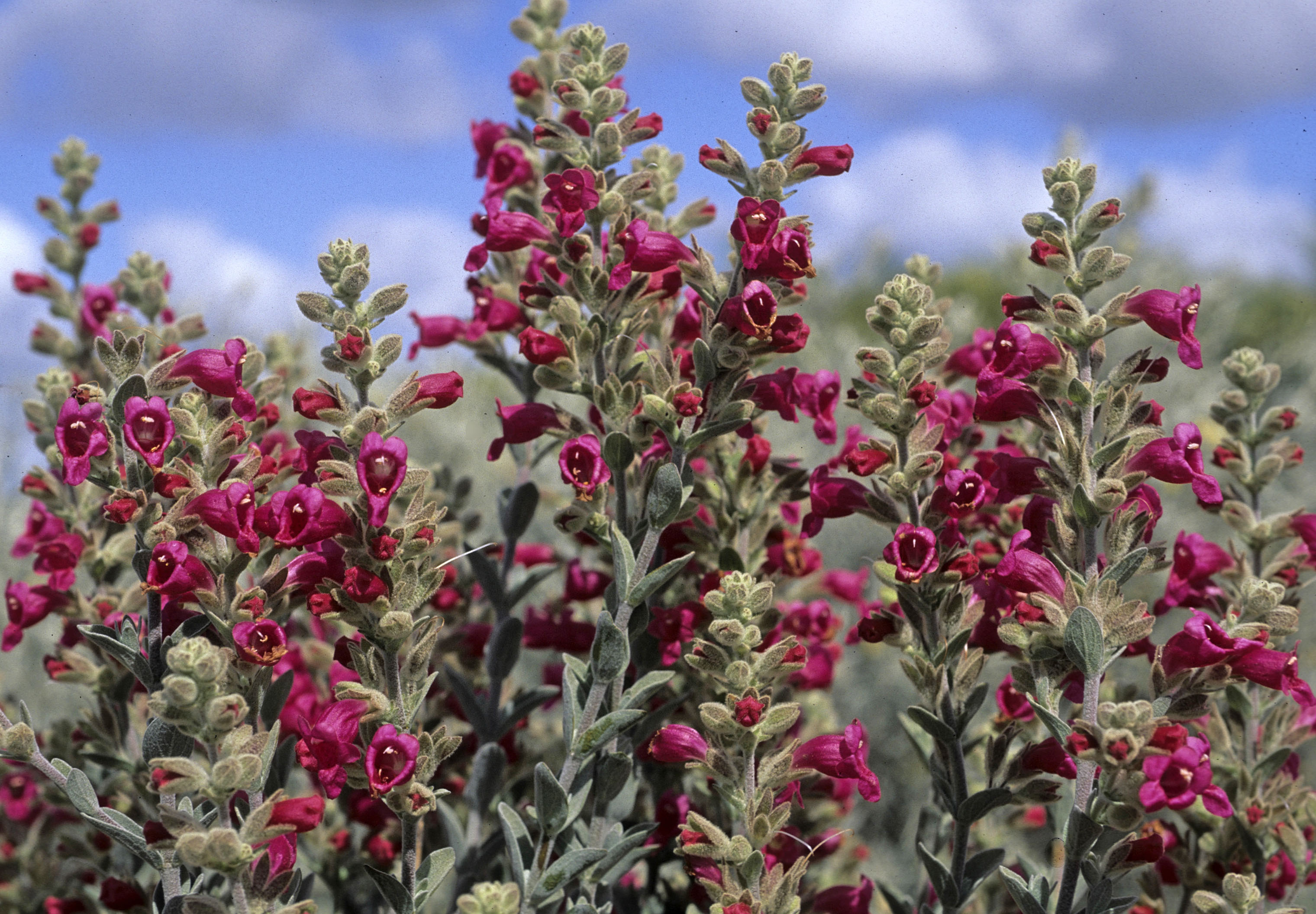
- Dasymalla terminalis near Mullewa

Scientific classification
- Kingdom: Plantae
- Clade: Tracheophytes
- Clade: Angiosperms
- Clade: Eudicots
- Clade: Asterids
- Order: Lamiales
- Family: Lamiaceae
- Genus: Dasymalla
- Species: D. terminalis

Binomial name
- Dasymalla terminalis Endl.

Synonyms
- Pityrodia terminalis (Endl.) A.S.George

= Dasymalla terminalis =

Native foxglove

Species of flowering plant

Dasymalla terminalis, commonly known as native foxglove, is a flowering plant in the mint family Lamiaceae and is endemic to the south-west of Western Australia. It is a shrub with its branches, leaves and some of its flower parts densely covered with white, woolly hairs. The leaves are thick and soft and the flowers are tube-shaped, pale to deep pinkish-purple or claret red.

== Description ==
Dasymalla terminalis is an erect shrub which grows to a height of 0.5–1 m (2–3 ft) with its branches and leaves densely covered with white or grey, woolly hairs. The leaves are oblong to narrowly elliptic, 2–3.5 cm (0.8–1 in) long, 0.8–1.5 cm (0.3–0.6 in) wide, thick, soft and covered with small pimples which are hidden in the thick layer of woolly hairs.

The flowers are pale to deep pinkish-purple or claret red and arranged in leaf axils in groups of up to five on a densely hairy stalk, 3–5 mm (0.1–0.2 in) long. (A form from near Lake Grace has white flowers.) The flowers are surrounded by woolly bracts and bracteoles which are hairy on the outside but glabrous on the inside. The five sepals are 1–1.5 cm (0.4–0.6 in) long and joined at their base to form a short tube which is woolly on the outside and glabrous on the inside. The five petals are joined to form a tube 15–20 mm (0.6–0.8 in) long, 8–10 mm (0.3–0.4 in) wide in the upper half, with five lobes on the end. The tube has scattered hairs outside but is glabrous inside except for a ring of hairs near the ovary. The lower petal lobe in more or less circular and almost twice as large as the other four lobes which are roughly equal in size. The four stamens are shorter than the tube with one pair slightly shorter than the other. Flowering occurs from May to November or December, and the hairy fruit which follows, splits into two when mature.

== Taxonomy and naming ==
Dasymalla terminalis was first formally described in 1839 by Stephan Endlicher, and the description was published in his book Novarum Stirpium Decades. The specific epithet (terminalis) is a Latin word meaning "of the ends".

== Distribution ==
This species of Dasymalla is the most widely distributed of the genus and grows from near the Murchison River in the north-west to Kalgoorlie in the south-east, in the Avon Wheatbelt, Coolgardie, Esperance Plains, Geraldton Sandplains, Mallee, Murchison and Yalgoo biogeographic regions.

== Conservation ==
Dasymalla terminalis is classified as "not threatened" by the Western Australian Government Department of Parks and Wildlife.
