= Dasymalla axillaris =

Conservation status
- Critically endangered (EPBC Act)

Scientific classification
- Kingdom: Plantae
- Clade: Tracheophytes
- Clade: Angiosperms
- Clade: Eudicots
- Clade: Asterids
- Order: Lamiales
- Family: Lamiaceae
- Genus: Dasymalla
- Species: D. axillaris

Binomial name
- Dasymalla axillaris Endl.

Synonyms
- Pityrodia axillaris (Endl.) Druce; Pityrodia spectabilis C.A.Gardner

Species of flowering plant

Dasymalla axillaris, commonly known as native foxglove or woolly foxglove, is a flowering plant in the mint family Lamiaceae and is endemic to Western Australia. It is a small, diffuse shrub with its branches, leaves and some of its flower parts densely covered with white, woolly hairs. The flowers are a shade of red and tube-shaped with the stamens and style extending beyond the end of the five petals.

== Description ==
Dasymalla axillaris is a diffuse shrub which grows to a height of about 0.3 m (1 ft) and which has its branches, leaves and sepals densely covered with white branched hairs. The leaves are stalkless, egg-shaped with the narrow end towards the base, 2–4 cm (0.8–2 in) long, 1–1.5 cm (0.4–0.6 in) wide and are wrinkled below their woolly covering.

The flowers are vivid in appearance, deep red to yellowish scarlet and are arranged singly or in groups of up to five in leaf axils on woolly stalks 3–6 mm (0.1–0.2 in) long. Each flower is surrounded by woolly bracts and bracteoles. The sepals are woolly-hairy on the outside, glabrous on the inside, 14–18 mm (0.6–0.7 in) long, forming a short tube near their base. The five petals form a broad tube 18–25 mm (0.7–1 in) long with five roughly circular lobes with a wavy to tooth-like end, the lower lobe slightly larger than the others. The tube is sparsely hairy on the outside and mostly glabrous on the inside, except for a ring of hairs near the ovary. The stamens are longer than the flower tube and the style is longer than the stamens. Flowering occurs from July to December and is followed by an egg-shaped fruit with two humps on the end and the sepals attached to it.

== Taxonomy and naming ==
Dasymalla axillaris was first formally described in 1839 by Stephan Endlicher and the description was published in his book Novarum Stirpium Decades. In 1917, George Druce transferred the species to Pityrodia but in 2011, Barry Conn, Murray Henwood and Nicola Streiber resurrected the genus Dasymalla, including this species. The specific epithet (axillaris) is a Latin word meaning "of an axil".

== Distribution and habitat ==
This species of Dasymalla grows in deep sand in recently disturbed areas about 200 km (100 mi) south-east of Geraldton in the Avon Wheatbelt, Swan Coastal Plain and Yalgoo biogeographic region and its numbers decline fairly rapidly following the disturbance.

== Conservation ==
Dasymalla axillaris is classified as "critically endangered" under the Environment Protection and Biodiversity Conservation Act 1999 and as "Threatened Flora (Declared Rare Flora — Extant)" by the Department of Environment and Conservation (Western Australia) meaning that it is likely to become extinct or is rare, or otherwise in need of special protection. The main threats to its survival are road and rail maintenance activities.
