= Augustus Frederick Oldfield =

English botanical collector (collected in Australia)

Augustus Frederick Oldfield (1821–1887) was an English botanist who made large collections of plant specimens in Australia.

Oldfield was born on 12 January 1821 in London, England. He made botanical collections in Tasmania, the coastal regions of Western Australia, and on the Nullarbor Plain. Records of his journey note him walking from Sydney to Melbourne, and collections at Twofold Bay, the Huon Valley and mountains in Tasmania, and other regions in the 1850s and 60s. The large body of material in the west of the country was collected from King George Sound to the Murchison River, and he travelled across the Nullarbor to Adelaide. Oldfield published a paper 'On the Aborigines of Australia' in 1865, a detailed survey of the cultural practices of the peoples living near Port Gregory.

He died on 22 May 1887, after returning to London in 1862.

His main collection was deposited at the National Herbarium of Victoria, Royal Botanic Gardens Victoria, by Ferdinand von Mueller, other parts of his herbaria are held at Kew and Western Australia.

Joseph Dalton Hooker notes his contribution in Flora Tasmaniae as "a zealous collector and as a careful and acute observer". Charles Darwin communicated with Oldfield, through Hooker, on the subject of Indigenous Australians. His name is commemorated in epithets of species such as Eucalyptus oldfieldii and Hakea oldfieldii.
