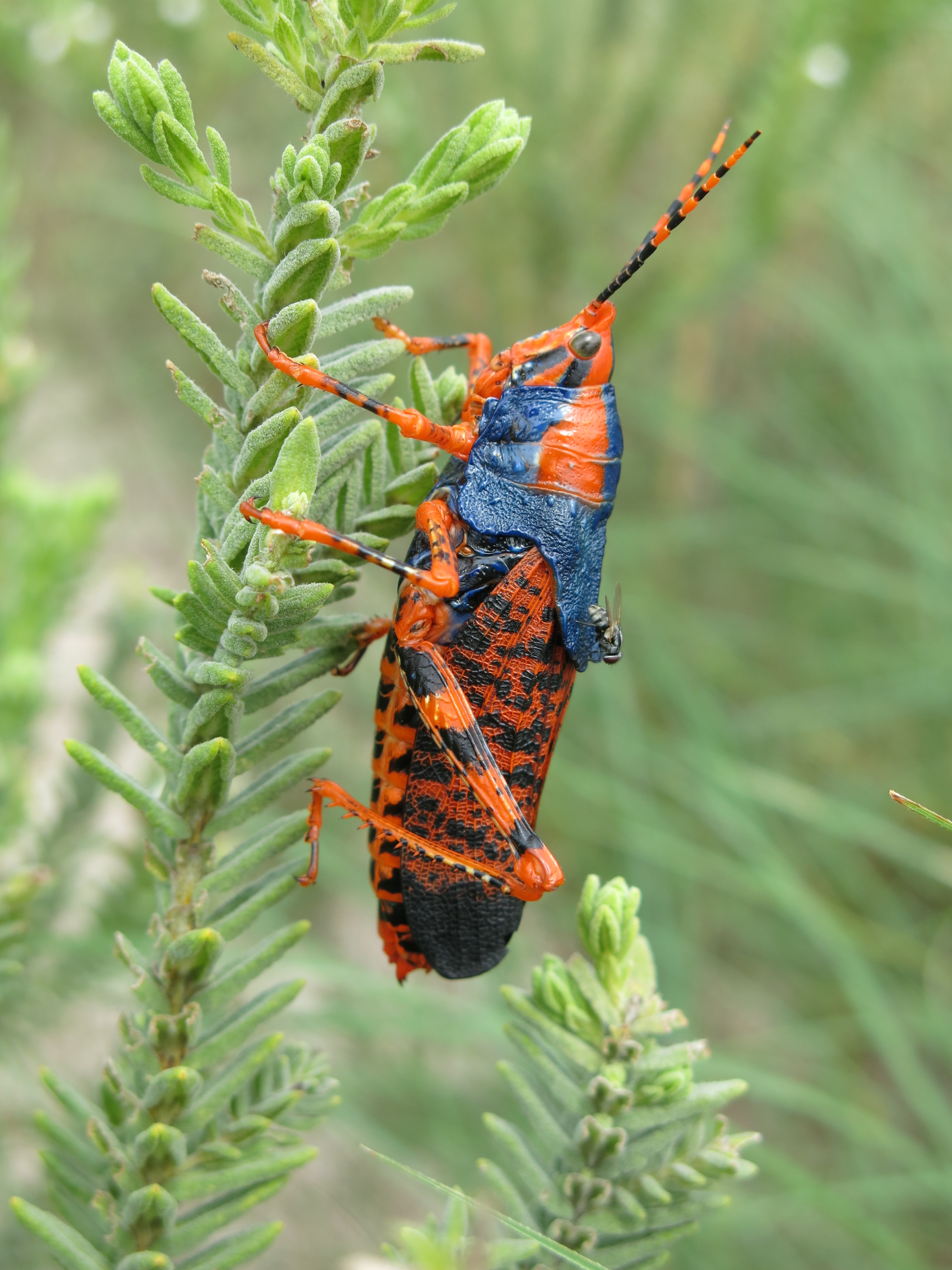
- Leichhardt's grasshopper on Pityrodia shrub in the Northern Territory, Australia

Scientific classification
- Kingdom: Animalia
- Phylum: Arthropoda
- Clade: Pancrustacea
- Class: Insecta
- Order: Orthoptera
- Suborder: Caelifera
- Family: Pyrgomorphidae
- Subfamily: Pyrgomorphinae
- Tribe: Petasidini
- Genus: Petasida; A. White, 1845
- Species: P. ephippigera

Binomial name
- Petasida ephippigera A. White, 1845

= Petasida =

Genus of grasshoppers

Petasida ephippigera, the Leichhardt's grasshopper, Alyurr, is a relatively large, brightly coloured pyrgomorph species of grasshopper in the monotypic genus Petasida, native to the Top End region of tropical northern Australia.

The Leichhardt's grasshopper is largely restricted to remote sandstone areas with Pityrodia shrubs, which are the main food source for both the adults and the nymphs. Although this shrub is quite widespread in the region, the Leichhardt's grasshopper appears to be local, scarce and declining for reasons that are not fully understood, but the controlled burning practices within its range are possibly part of the explanation. The Leichhardt's grasshopper is one of the most emblematic animals of the Kakadu National Park (seeing it there requires some effort), and it also occurs in the Nitmiluk and Keep River National Parks.

== History ==
This grasshopper is known as alyurr in the local Kundjeyhmi language and it plays a role in their mythology.

The species is named after Ludwig Leichhardt. He was the second European to record this grasshopper in 1845 in an area that later would become part of the Kakadu National Park. The species was first recorded by John Dring on the third HMS Beagle expedition a couple of years earlier (during which the type specimen was collected) and it was recorded again by the A.C. Gregory expedition of 1855–56. Subsequently, it went unreported until the early 1970s when it was rediscovered as a result of the emerging mining and ranching industries in the remote region.

== Feeding ==
Both adults and nymphs of the Leichhardt's grasshopper feed almost exclusively on Pityrodia shrubs, including P. jamesii, P. lanuginosa, P. puberula, P. pungens, P. spenceri and P. ternifolia. They often move little during their life; an individual may stay on a single Pityrodia bush. Although Pityrodia clearly is the main food plant, Leichhardt's grasshoppers have also been reported feeding on Dampiera conospermoides and Gardenia.

== Appearance ==
Adult males typically are up to about 5.3 cm (2.1 in) long and adult females up to about 6 cm (2.4 in) long. Adults of both sexes are bright orange-red with significant blue patches on the head and thorax, and black or very dark blue dappled spots on the abdomen and wings. There are minor local variations; those from Keep River National Park tend to be somewhat paler than those found further east. The nymphs are about 1 cm (0.4 in) long when hatching and the first couple of instars are cryptically coloured in pale green and black; the later instars have an adult-like appearance, but with whitish spots and no or only small emerging wings. The bright colours are aposematic, a warning to potential predators that it is noxious or toxic. While this appears to be highly effective against predatory vertebrates, the effect against predatory invertebrates is limited.
