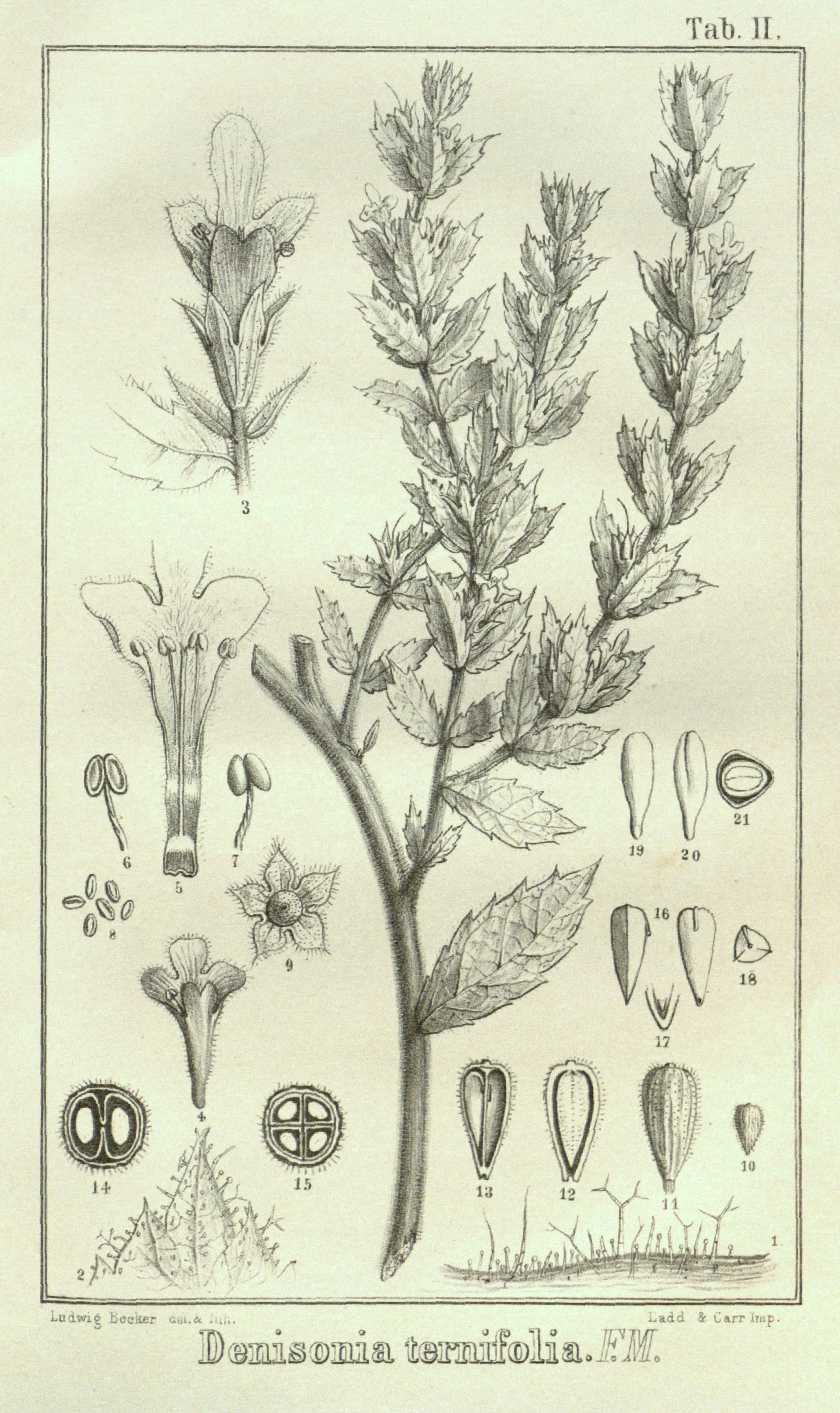
- Illustration by Ludwig Becker in Fragmenta Phytographiae Australiae

Conservation status
- Least Concern (TPWCA)

Scientific classification
- Kingdom: Plantae
- Clade: Tracheophytes
- Clade: Angiosperms
- Clade: Eudicots
- Clade: Asterids
- Order: Lamiales
- Family: Lamiaceae
- Genus: Pityrodia
- Species: P. ternifolia

Binomial name
- Pityrodia ternifolia (F.Muell.) Munir
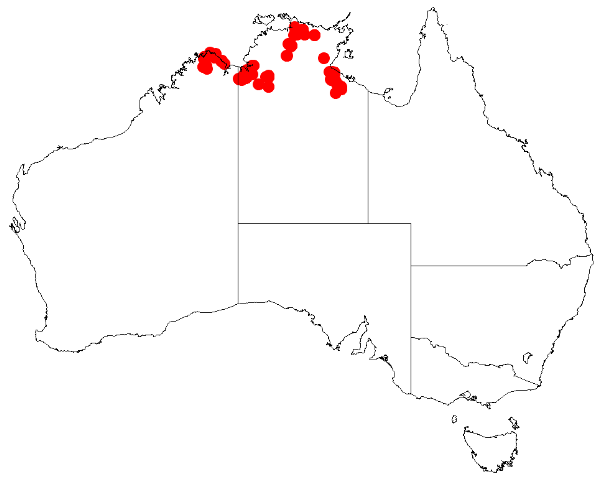
- Occurrence data from the ALA

Synonyms
- Chloanthes denisonii F.Muell. nom. illeg.; Dennisonia ternifolia F.Muell.

= Pityrodia ternifolia =

Species of flowering plant

Pityrodia ternifolia is a species of flowering plant in the mint family, Lamiaceae and is endemic to north-western Australia. It is an erect shrub with densely hairy stems, sticky and prickly, egg-shaped leaves, and mauve or pinkish-red, tube-shaped flowers.

== Description ==
Pityrodia ternifolia is an erect shrub that has its stems and branches densely covered with woolly, glandular hairs. Its leaves are usually arranged in whorls of three, sticky and prickly, egg-shaped, mostly 15–50 mm (0.59–1.97 in) long, 0.8–2 mm (0.031–0.079 in) wide and sessile. The edges of the leaves are toothed and sometimes sharply pointed, and there are scattered glandular hairs on both surfaces. The flowers are arranged singly in leaf axils on a thin pedicel, usually shorter than the leaves and there are leaf-like bracts and linear or narrowly elliptic bracteoles at the base of the flowers. The sepals are 8–10 mm (0.31–0.39 in) long and joined at the base forming a bell-shaped tube with five lance-shaped lobes 4–7 mm (0.16–0.28 in) long. The five petals are mauve or pinkish-red, 11–14 mm (0.43–0.55 in) long and joined at the base to form a more or less cylindrical tube with two "lips". The lower lip has 3 lobes, the middle lobe larger than the other two and 4–6 mm (0.16–0.24 in) long, the upper lip with 2 oblong or narrowly elliptic lobes 3.0–4.5 mm (0.12–0.18 in) long, with deep, purplish streaks. Flowering occurs from March to August and the fruit is oval, glabrous and 3.0–4.5 mm (0.12–0.18 in) long.

== Taxonomy ==
This species was first formally described in 1859 by Ferdinand von Mueller who gave it the name Dennisonia ternifolia in the Journal of the Proceedings of the Linnean Society, Botany. In 1979, Ahmad Abid Munir moved it to the genus Pityrodia as Pityrodia ternifolia in the Journal of the Adelaide Botanic Gardens. The specific epithet (ternifolia) means "three-leaved", referring to the whorled leaves.`

== Distribution and habitat ==
This pityrodia grows in sandy soils on sandstone ridges and rocks in the Northern Kimberley, Victoria Bonaparte, Arnhem Coast, Arnhem Plateau, Darwin Coastal, Gulf Coastal, Gulf Fall and Uplands, Ord Victoria Plain and Pine Creek bioregions of the Northern Territory and Western Australia.

== Conservation status ==
Pityrodia ternifolia is listed as of "least concern" under the Northern Territory Government Territory Parks and Wildlife Conservation Act and as "not threatened" by the Government of Western Australia Department of Biodiversity, Conservation and Attractions.

Together with P. jamesii and P. pungens, P. ternifolia is a primary food source for the uncommon and very brightly coloured Leichhardt's grasshopper (Petasida ephippigera).
