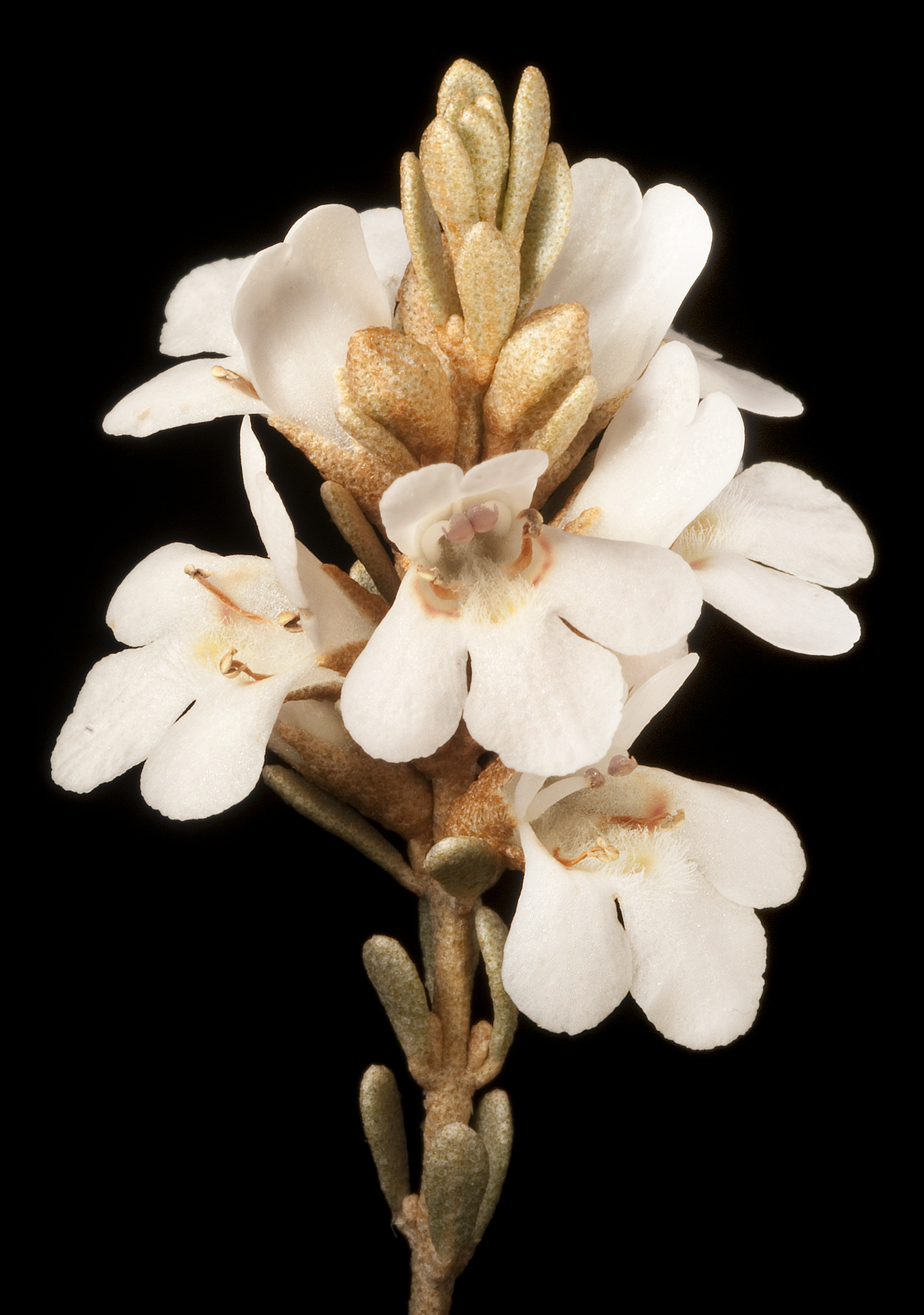
- Pityrodia lepidota leaves and flowers

Scientific classification
- Kingdom: Plantae
- Clade: Tracheophytes
- Clade: Angiosperms
- Clade: Eudicots
- Clade: Asterids
- Order: Lamiales
- Family: Lamiaceae
- Genus: Pityrodia
- Species: P. lepidota

Binomial name
- Pityrodia lepidota (Munir) E.Pritz.
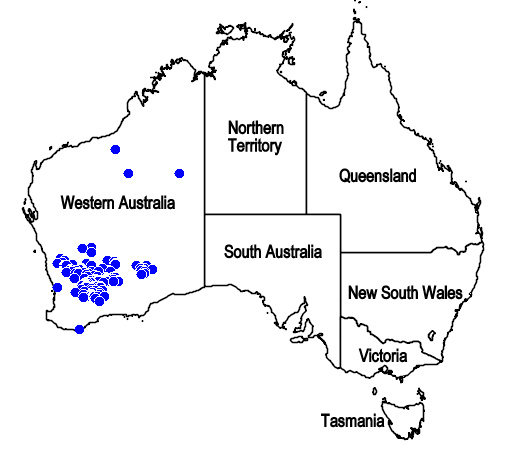
- Occurrence data from the ALA

= Pityrodia lepidota =

Species of flowering plant

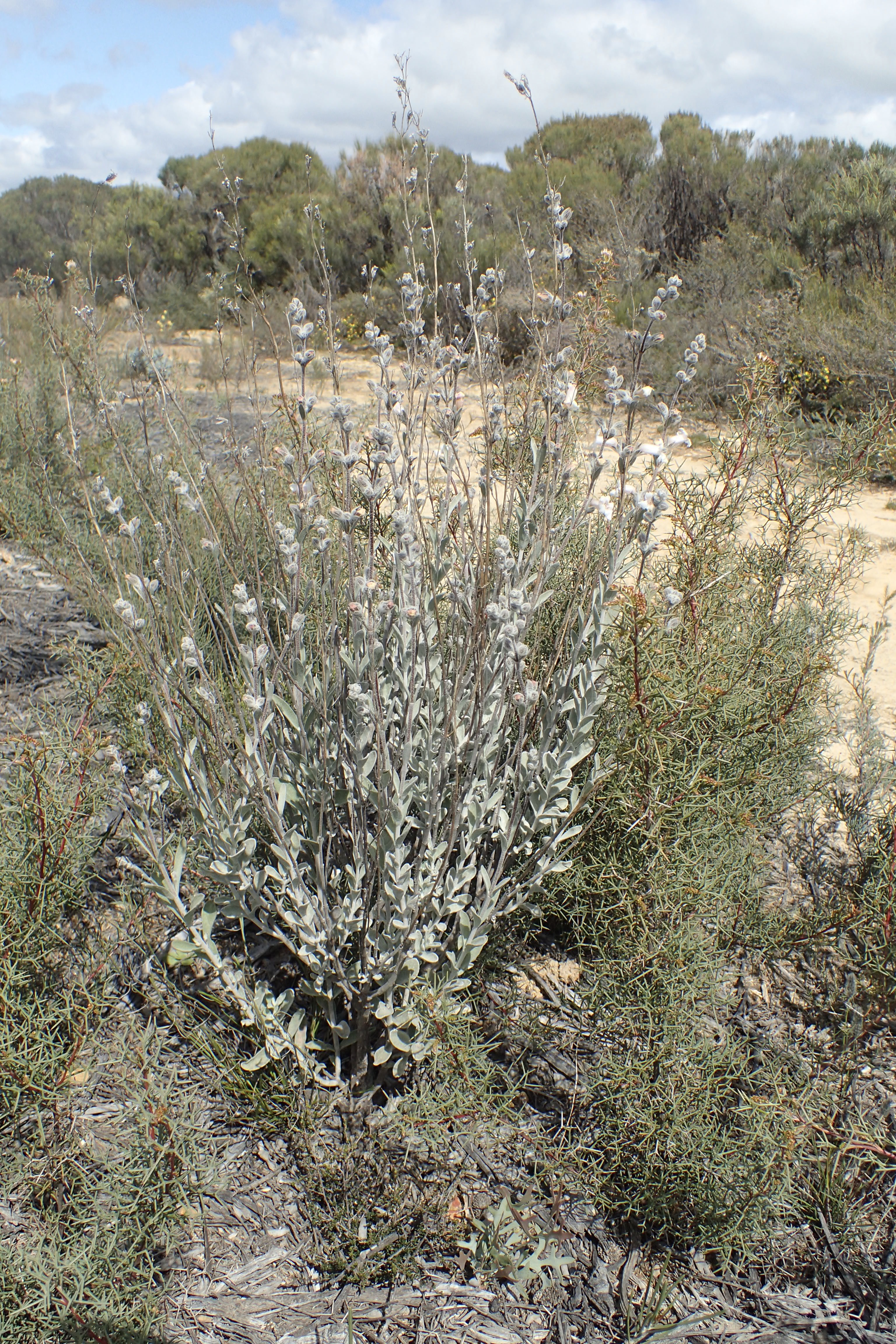
Habit

Pityrodia lepidota is a flowering plant in the mint family Lamiaceae and is endemic to the south-west of Western Australia. It is a small, densely-branched shrub with small leaves and whitish, bell-shaped flowers. The entire plant, apart from the petals, is densely covered with small, circular scales.

== Description ==
Pityrodia lepidota is a dense, multi-stemmed shrub which usually grows to a height of 0.3–0.7 m (1–2 ft) and which has its branches and leaves densely covered with ash coloured, circular scales. The leaves are stalkless, egg-shaped to lance-shaped with the narrower end towards the base, 5–10 mm (0.2–0.4 in) long and 2–3 mm (0.08–0.1 in) wide.

The flowers are solitary or in groups of two or three on short, scaly stalks in upper leaf axils. The flowers are surrounded by scaly, linear to lance-shaped bracts and tiny bracteoles. Single flowers are surrounded by leafy bracts 5–10 mm (0.2–0.4 in) long and the groups by scaly bracts about 2 mm (0.08 in) long. The five sepals are 5–6 mm (0.20–0.24 in) long, densely covered with scales on the outside and joined for about half their length to form a tube with five blunt lobes. The five petals are 7–10 mm (0.3–0.4 in) long, whitish, pale pink or pale lilac coloured and joined to form a bell-shaped tube with five lobes on the end. The tube is mostly glabrous except for a densely hairy ring around the ovary and a few hairs on the lowest petal lobe. The lowest, central lobe is oblong to egg-shaped, 4–5 mm (0.2–0.2 in) long, 3–4 mm (0.1–0.2 in) wide and the other lobes are slightly smaller. Flowering occurs from June to December, sometimes as late as March and is followed by hairy, oval-shaped fruit with the sepals still attached.

== Taxonomy and naming ==
This species was first formally described in 1883 by Ferdinand von Mueller who gave it the name Chloanthes lepidota and published the description in Southern Science Record. In 1904 Georg Pritzel changed the name to Pityrodia lepidota. The specific epithet (lepidota) is derived from the Latin word lepidotus, a latinization of the ancient Greek word lepidōtos (λεπιδωτός), meaning "scaled", itself derived from the ancient Greek word lepis, genitive lepidos (λεπίς, genitive λεπίδος), meaning "scale".

== Distribution and habitat ==
This pityrodia grows in sandy or gravelly soils on sandplains and dunes. It is mainly found in the between Merredin and Coolgardie, as far north as Mongers Lake near Perenjori and Lake Moore near Wubin and as far south as the Lake King to Lake Grace road. Its distribution lies within the Avon Wheatbelt, Coolgardie, Great Victoria Desert, Mallee and Murchison biogeographic regions.

== Conservation ==
Pityrodia lepidota is classified as "not threatened" by the Western Australian Government Department of Parks and Wildlife.
