= Pityrodia iphthima =

Conservation status
- Priority One — Poorly Known Taxa (DEC)

Scientific classification
- Kingdom: Plantae
- Clade: Tracheophytes
- Clade: Angiosperms
- Clade: Eudicots
- Clade: Asterids
- Order: Lamiales
- Family: Lamiaceae
- Genus: Pityrodia
- Species: P. iphthima

Binomial name
- Pityrodia iphthima K.A.Sheph.
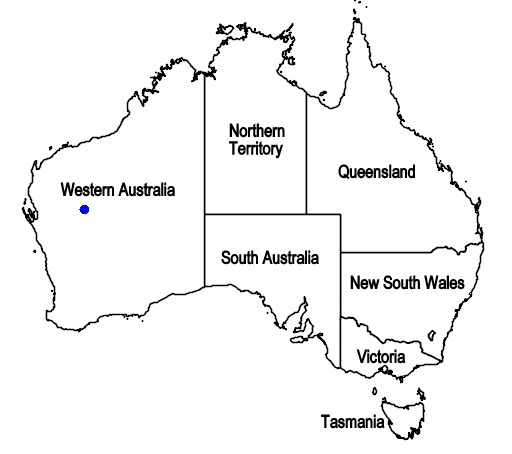
- Occurrence data from the ALA

Species of flowering plant

Pityrodia iphthima is a flowering plant in the mint family Lamiaceae and is endemic to a small area in Western Australia. It is a small shrub with its branches, leaves and some of its flower parts densely covered with matted hairs. It has spike-like groups of up to forty flowers on the ends of the branches, the flowers tube-shaped, deep lilac and white, with brown spots inside.

== Description ==
Pityrodia iphthima is a shrub which grows to a height of about 1 m (3 ft) and which has its branches densely covered with matted, greenish-white branched hairs. The leaves are arranged in opposite pairs along the branches and are 23–41 mm (0.9–2 in) long, 4–10 mm (0.2–0.4 in) wide and narrow egg-shaped. They are folded lengthwise in a V-shape with the upper surface more or less glabrous and the lower surface covered with star-like hairs, similar to those on the branches.

The flowers are arranged in spike-like groups 55–170 mm (2–7 in) long, of between ten and forty flowers on woolly stalks 2–3 mm (0.08–0.1 in) long. There is a leaf-like, narrow egg-shaped bract 7–20 mm (0.3–0.8 in) long and narrow egg-shaped bracteoles 2–6.5 mm (0.08–0.3 in) long at the base of the flowers. The sepals are green with purplish tips, 7.5–10 mm (0.3–0.4 in) long joined at the base to form a tube 1–3 mm (0.04–0.1 in) long with narrow egg-shaped lobes. The petals are a deep lilac colour, grading to white and form a broad tube 8–15 mm (0.3–0.6 in) long with brown spots inside the tube. The petal lobes form two "lips", the upper one with two lobes and the lower one with three. The tube is sparsely hairy on the outside and mostly glabrous on the inside apart from a densely hairy ring around the ovary. The middle lobe of the lower lip is the largest, 5.3–7 mm (0.2–0.3 in) long and 6.5–10.5 mm (0.3–0.4 in) wide. The four stamens are usually enclosed within the tube, one pair shorter than the others. Flowers have only been observed in August.

This species is similar to P. augustensis but is distinguished by its relatively glabrous upper leaf surface and longer sepal tube.

== Taxonomy and naming ==
Pityrodia iphthima was first formally described in 2007 by Kelly Shepherd from a specimen collected on the Robinson Ranges near Meekatharra and the description was published in Nuytsia. The specific epithet (iphthima) is derived from an Ancient Greek word meaning "strong", "stout" or "stalwart", referring to the harsh, rocky habitat of this species.

== Distribution and habitat ==
This pityrodia grows on rocky hillsides of banded ironstone in the Gascoyne biogeographic region.

== Conservation ==
Pityrodia iphthima is classified as "Priority One" by the Government of Western Australia Department of Parks and Wildlife, meaning that it is known from only one or a few locations which are potentially at risk.
