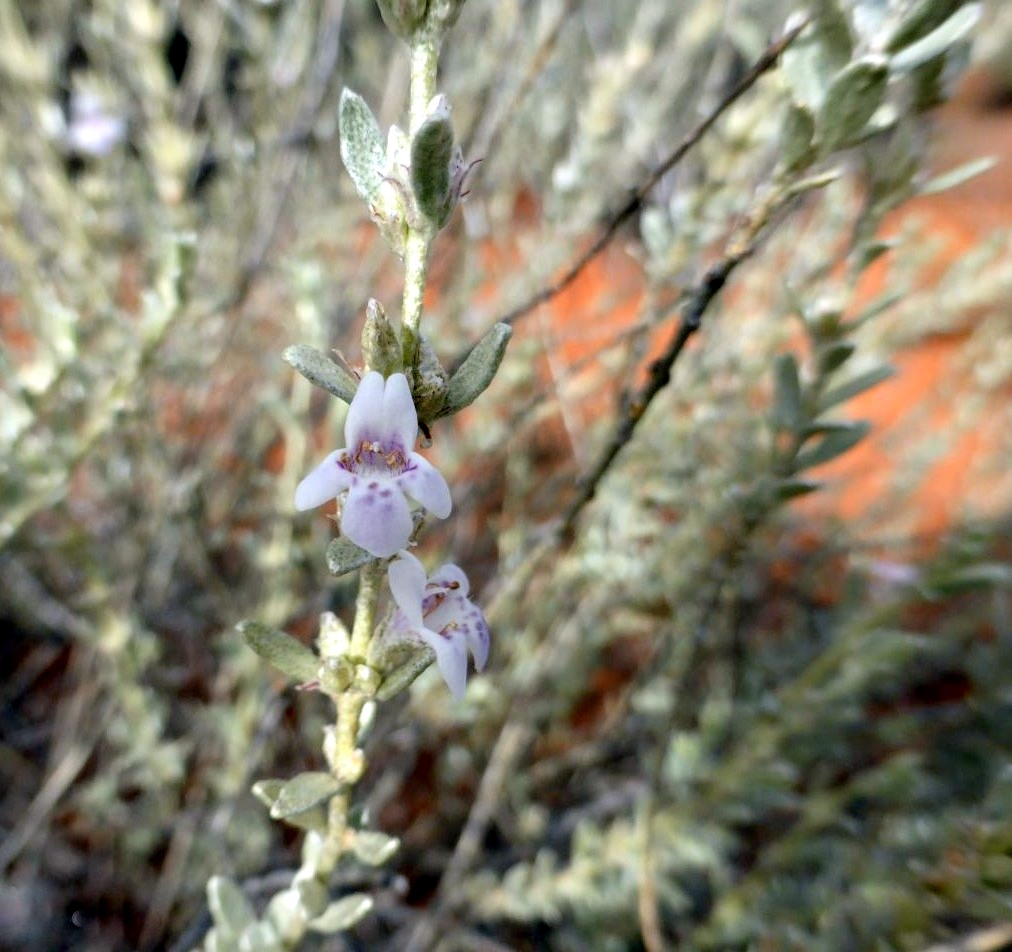
- Pityrodia loricata leaves and flowers

Scientific classification
- Kingdom: Plantae
- Clade: Tracheophytes
- Clade: Angiosperms
- Clade: Eudicots
- Clade: Asterids
- Order: Lamiales
- Family: Lamiaceae
- Genus: Pityrodia
- Species: P. loricata

Binomial name
- Pityrodia loricata (Munir) E.Pritz.
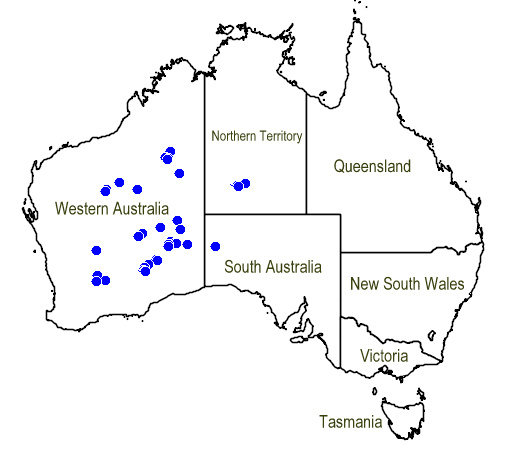
- Occurrence data from the ALA

= Pityrodia loricata =

Species of plant

Pityrodia loricata is a flowering plant in the mint family Lamiaceae and is endemic to Australia. It is a dense, greyish, multi-stemmed shrub with whorled leaves, prominent sepals and pale, pinkish-white flowers. It is common in Western Australia and the Northern Territory and there is a single record from South Australia.

== Description ==
Pityrodia loricata is a dense, multi-stemmed shrub which usually grows to a height of 0.3–0.6 m (1–2 ft) and which has its branches and leaves densely covered with silvery, shield-shaped scales, although the scales may be difficult to see without a hand lens. The leaves are stalkless, arranged in whorls, more or less crowded near the ends of the branches, lance-shaped, 8–20 cm (3–8 in) long and 3–5 mm (0.1–0.2 in) wide.

The flowers are pale whitish-pink and are usually arranged in groups of up to three on stalks 1–2 mm (0.04–0.08 in) long in upper leaf axils. The flowers are surrounded by linear to lance-shaped bracts and bracteoles which are 2–5 mm (0.08–0.2 in) long, scaly on the outside and glabrous and scale-less on the inside. The five sepals are 5–7 mm (0.2–0.3 in) long and joined for about half their length to form a tube with five lance-shaped lobes. The sepals are scaly on the outside of the tube and on the lobes but the inside of the sepal tube is glabrous. The five petals are 7–9 mm (0.3–0.4 in) long and glabrous except for a densely hairy ring around the ovary and a few long hairs on the lowest petal. The petals are joined to form a tube with five lobes in two "lips", the lower lip having three lobes. The central, lower lobe is broad elliptic to almost circular in shape, 3–4 mm (0.1–0.2 in) long and about 3 mm (0.1 in) wide and significantly larger than the other four which are about the same size as each other. Flowering occurs from May to November and is followed by hairy, oval-shaped fruit with the sepals still attached.

== Taxonomy and naming ==
This species was first formally described in 1876 by Ferdinand von Mueller who gave it the name Chloanthes loricata and published the description in Fragmenta phytographiae Australiae. In 1904 Georg Pritzel changed the name to Pityrodia loricata. The specific epithet (loricata) is a Latin word meaning "clad in mail".

== Distribution and habitat ==
This pityrodia grows in red or yellow sand on sand dunes. It is found in the near Lake Carnegie, Coolgardie and Eucla districts in Western Australia, near Mount Sonder in the MacDonnell Ranges in the Northern Territory and there is a single record from Mamungari Conservation Park in South Australia.

== Conservation ==
Pityrodia loricata is classified as "not threatened" by the Western Australian Government Department of Parks and Wildlife.
