= Pityrodia obliqua =

Conservation status
- Priority Three — Poorly Known Taxa (DEC)

Scientific classification
- Kingdom: Plantae
- Clade: Tracheophytes
- Clade: Angiosperms
- Clade: Eudicots
- Clade: Asterids
- Order: Lamiales
- Family: Lamiaceae
- Genus: Pityrodia
- Species: P. obliqua

Binomial name
- Pityrodia obliqua W.Fitzg.
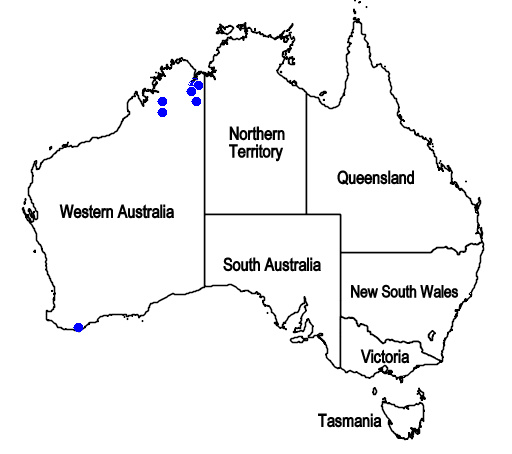
- Occurrence data from the ALA

Species of flowering plant

Pityrodia obliqua is a flowering plant in the mint family Lamiaceae and is endemic to the Kimberley region of Western Australia. It is an erect shrub with hairy stems, wrinkled, egg-shaped leaves and pink, bell-like flowers with purple streaks inside.

== Description ==
Pityrodia obliqua is an erect shrub which grows to a height of about 60–120 cm (24–47 in), its branches covered with greenish grey hairs. The leaves are egg-shaped with a blunt tip, mostly 30–60 mm (1.2–2.4 in) long and 10–25 mm (0.4–1 in) wide with a petiole 10–18 mm (0.4–0.7 in) long. The leaves are hairy on both surfaces, wrinkled on the top and with conspicuous veins on the lower side.

The flowers are arranged in groups of between three and seven in the upper leaf axils, the groups usually shorter than the leaves. The stalks of the flowers and the outside of the sepals and petals are densely covered with woolly hairs. The five sepals are joined only near their bases and are glabrous inside. The petals are pink with purple streaks inside, mostly 8–12 mm (0.31–0.47 in) long and mostly glabrous inside except for a hairy ring just above the ovary and a few long hairs on the lower petal. The petals are joined to form a tube about as long as the speals, with five unequal lobes. The lower middle lobe is more or less round, 3–4 mm (0.1–0.2 in) long, 4–6 mm (0.2–0.2 in) wide and the other four lobes are egg-shaped and smaller. The four stamens extend slightly beyond the end of the tube, one pair slightly shorter than the other. Flowering occurs from May to July and is followed by a black, almost spherical fruit 2–3 mm (0.079–0.12 in) in diameter.

== Taxonomy and naming ==
Pityrodia obliqua was first formally described in 1918 by William Vincent Fitzgerald and description was published in Journal and Proceedings of the Royal Society of Western Australia. The specific epithet (obliqua) is a Latin word meaning "slanting", "sideways" or "indirect".

== Distribution ==
This pityrodia occurs in the Kimberley region of Western Australia, where it grows on rocky places in mountain ranges.

== Conservation ==
Pityrodia byrnesii is classified as "Priority One" by the Government of Western Australia Department of Parks and Wildlife, meaning that it is known from only one or a few locations which are potentially at risk.
