= Pityrodia gilruthiana =

Scientific classification
- Kingdom: Plantae
- Clade: Tracheophytes
- Clade: Angiosperms
- Clade: Eudicots
- Clade: Asterids
- Order: Lamiales
- Family: Lamiaceae
- Genus: Pityrodia
- Species: P. gilruthiana

Binomial name
- Pityrodia gilruthiana Munir
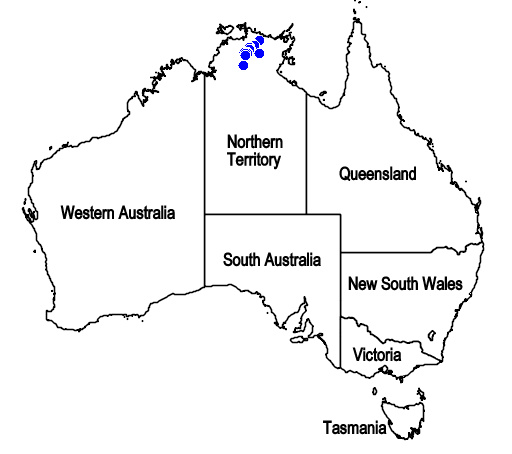
- Occurrence data from the ALA

Species of flowering plant

Pityrodia gilruthiana is a flowering plant in the mint family Lamiaceae and is endemic to Arnhem Land in the Northern Territory. It is a dark green, spreading shrub with sticky, glandular branches and leaves and fragrant, off-white, bell-like flowers with purple stripes on the end.

== Description ==
Pityrodia gilruthiana is a spreading shrub which grows to a height of about 1.5 m (5 ft) and which has branches sticky due to the presence of branched, glandular hairs. The leaves are linear to narrow lance-shaped, glabrous but sticky, 8–25 cm (3–10 in) long, 2–4 mm (0.08–0.2 in) wide, darker green on the upper surface and have a prominent mid-vein on the lower surface.

The flowers are fragrant and stalkless, arranged singly in upper leaf axils with a leaf-like bract and leafy, narrow linear to lance-shaped sticky bracteoles 3–6 mm (0.1–0.2 in) long at their base. The sepals are 7–10 mm (0.3–0.4 in) long and joined for less than half their length to form a bell-shaped tube with five lance-shaped lobes on the end. The lobes are lance-shaped, 4.5–7 mm (0.2–0.3 in) long, hairy and sticky except that the inside of the tubular part is glabrous. The five petals are 10–13 mm (0.4–0.5 in) long and joined to form an almost cylindrical tube 6–8 mm (0.2–0.3 in) long with five lobes on the end. The tube is off-white in colour with deep purple streaks on the upper lip. The lobes form two "lips" - the upper one with two lobes and the lower one longer with three lobes. The outer, top part of the tube has soft hairs but the rest is mostly glabrous apart from a dense hairy ring below the stamens. The lobes are more or less egg-shaped, the upper ones 2–4 mm (0.08–0.2 in) long and the lower ones are slightly longer and more spreading. The four stamens extend slightly beyond the end of the tube, the lower pair slightly longer than the other one. Flowering occurs in from February to August and is followed by an oval-shaped, hairy, fruit 3–4 mm (0.1–0.2 in) long.

== Taxonomy and naming ==
Pityrodia gilruthiana was first formally described in 1979 by Ahmad Abid Munir from a specimen collected near the Mount Gilruth in the Northern Territory. The description was published in Journal of the Adelaide Botanic Gardens.

== Distribution ==
This pityrodia occurs in Arnhem Land near Mount Gilruth in the Kakadu National Park including the Arnhem Plateau and Pine Creek biogeographic regions.

== Conservation ==
Pityrodia gilruthiana is classified as "least concern" under the Territory Parks and Wildlife Conservation Act 2000.
