= Pityrodia canaliculata =

Conservation status
- Priority One — Poorly Known Taxa (DEC)

Scientific classification
- Kingdom: Plantae
- Clade: Tracheophytes
- Clade: Angiosperms
- Clade: Eudicots
- Clade: Asterids
- Order: Lamiales
- Family: Lamiaceae
- Genus: Pityrodia
- Species: P. canaliculata

Binomial name
- Pityrodia canaliculata A.S.George
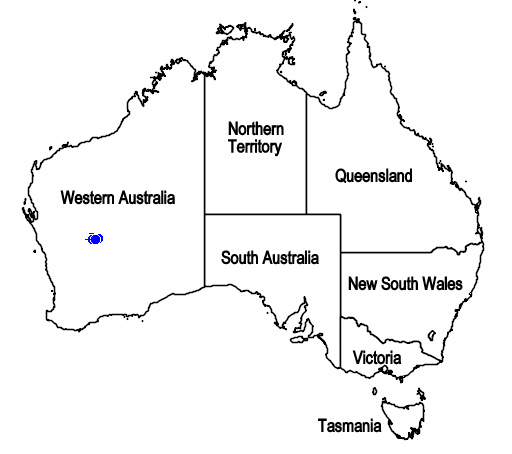
- Occurrence data from the Atlas of Living Australia

Species of flowering plant

Pityrodia canaliculata is a flowering plant in the mint family Lamiaceae and is endemic to a small area in Western Australia. It is a many-branched shrub with all its parts, except the petals covered with small, circular scales. The tube-shaped flowers are white with reddish spots inside.

== Description ==
Pityrodia canaliculata is a shrub with many branches and which grows to a height of 1–2.5 m (3–8 ft) with its branches and leaves densely covered with minute, circular scales. The leaves are dark green, arranged in opposite pairs and covered with similar scales to those on the branches. The leaves are 1.5–4.5 cm (0.6–2 in) long, 2–4 mm (0.08–0.2 in) wide, linear in shape with a groove on the upper surface and a keel on the lower surface.

The flowers are arranged singly or in groups of up to three on scaly stalks 1.5–3 mm (0.06–0.1 in) long in upper leaf axils. The five sepals are joined to form a bell-shaped tube 3–4.5 mm (0.1–0.2 in) long, scaly on the outside but glabrous inside. The five petals are joined to form a white tube 8–10 mm (0.3–0.4 in) long with reddish spots inside. The upper half of the tube is covered with scales on the outside and there is a dense hairy ring inside the tube at the base of the stamens. The lower central lobe at the end of the tube is elliptic to almost round, 4–5 mm (0.16–0.20 in) in diameter while the other four lobes are narrower and shorter. The four stamens extend slightly beyond the end of the tube, the lower pair longer than the upper pair. Flowering occurs from June to September and is followed by an oval or pear-shaped fruit 3–4 mm (0.1–0.2 in) long with the sepals attached.

== Taxonomy and naming ==
Pityrodia canaliculata was first formally described in 1967 by Alex George from a specimen collected west of Sandstone, and the description was published in Journal of the Royal Society of Western Australia. The specific epithet (canaliculata) is a Latin word meaning "canaliculate" or "channelled", referring to the leaves.

== Distribution and habitat ==
This pityrodia grows in red sand near Sandstone in the Murchison biogeographic region.

== Conservation ==
Pityrodia canaliculata is classified as "Priority One" by the Government of Western Australia Department of Parks and Wildlife, meaning that it is known from only one or a few locations which are potentially at risk.
