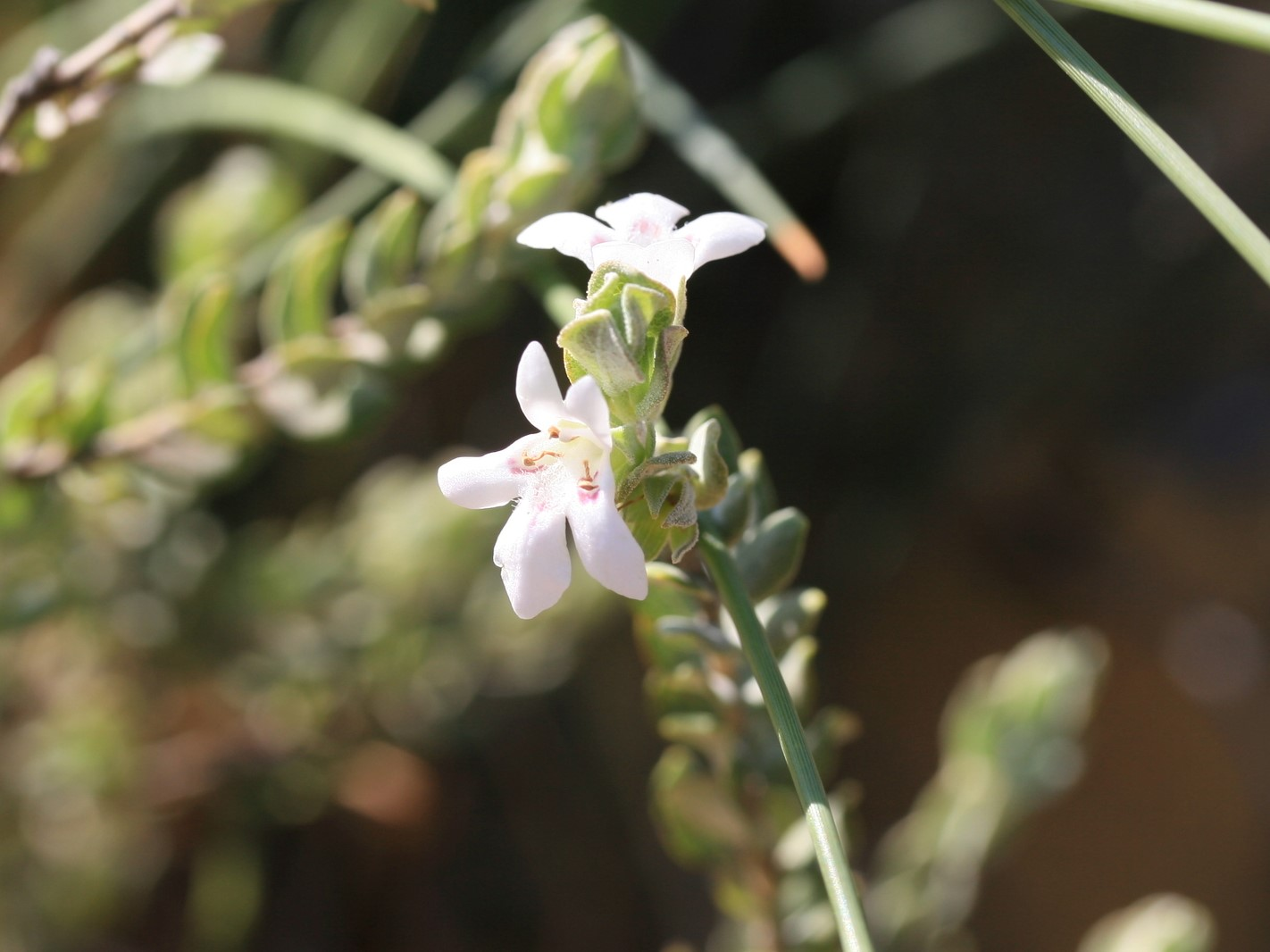

Conservation status
- Priority Three — Poorly Known Taxa (DEC)

Scientific classification
- Kingdom: Plantae
- Clade: Tracheophytes
- Clade: Angiosperms
- Clade: Eudicots
- Clade: Asterids
- Order: Lamiales
- Family: Lamiaceae
- Genus: Pityrodia
- Species: P. hemigenioides

Binomial name
- Pityrodia hemigenioides (F.Muell.) Benth.
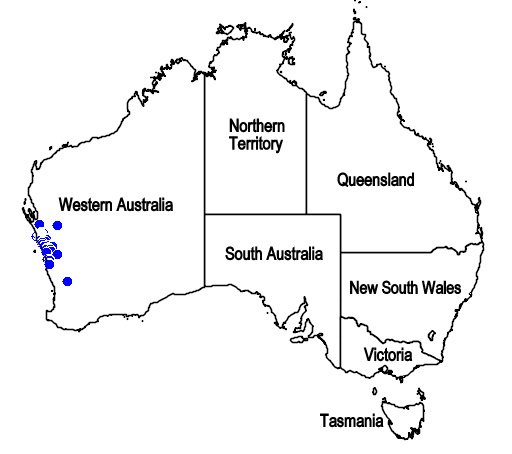
- Occurrence data from the Atlas of Living Australia

= Pityrodia hemigenioides =

Species of flowering plant

Pityrodia hemigenioides is a species of flowering plant in the mint family Lamiaceae and is endemic to the south-west of Western Australia. It is a spreading shrub with densely hairy branches and leaves, and pale white flowers near the ends of the branches.

== Description ==
Pityrodia hemigenioides is a spreading shrub which grows to a height of 30–60 cm (10–20 in) with its branches densely covered with short, whitish or ash-coloured branched, hairs. The leaves vary in shape from linear to egg-shaped, mostly 8–15 mm (0.3–0.6 in) long, 4–8 mm (0.2–0.3 in) wide and covered with hairs similar to those on the branches, at least when young. Older leaves are glabrous with prominent network veins on the lower surface and the edges of the leaves are usually rolled under.

The flowers are arranged singly in upper leaf axils, crowded together so that they seem to form a spike of flowers. There is a leaf-like bract 7–10 mm (0.3–0.4 in) long and two smaller, leaf-like bracteoles 4–8 mm (0.2–0.3 in) long at the base of the flower. The five sepals are 7–10 mm (0.3–0.4 in) long and joined at the base to form a tube 1.5–3 mm (0.06–0.1 in) long. The sepals are covered with hairs similar to those on the leaves, except that the inside of the tube is glabrous. The five petals are joined to form a pale white tube 9–12 mm (0.4–0.5 in) long with five lobes on the end. The petal tube has a few soft hairs on the outside at first, but is glabrous inside apart from a densely hairy ring above the ovary and a few hairs on the largest petal lobe. The lower, middle lobe is broad elliptic to almost circular, 3–5 mm (0.1–0.2 in) broad and long while the other four lobes are smaller and roughly similar in size to each other, roughly egg-shaped and 3–5 mm (0.1–0.2 in) long. Flowering occurs from July to October and is followed by a hairy, oval fruit about 4–5 mm (0.16–0.20 in) long with the sepals attached and a network of veins on the surface.

== Taxonomy and naming ==
This species was first formally described in 1868 by Ferdinand von Mueller who gave it the name Chloanthes hemigenioides and published the description in Fragmenta phytographiae Australiae. In 1870, George Bentham changed the name to Pityrodia hemigenioides. The specific epithet (hemigenioides) refers to a perceived similarity to plants in the genus Hemigenia - the suffix -oides means "likeness" in Latin.

== Distribution and habitat ==
This pityrodia grows in yellow sand on sandplains and dunes, mainly in near-coastal areas between Geraldton and Shark Bay in the Avon Wheatbelt, Geraldton Sandplains and Yalgoo biogeographic regions.

== Conservation ==
Pityrodia hemigenioides is classified as "not threatened" by the Government of Western Australia Department of Parks and Wildlife.
