= Pityrodia serrata =

Scientific classification
- Kingdom: Plantae
- Clade: Tracheophytes
- Clade: Angiosperms
- Clade: Eudicots
- Clade: Asterids
- Order: Lamiales
- Family: Lamiaceae
- Genus: Pityrodia
- Species: P. serrata

Binomial name
- Pityrodia serrata Munir
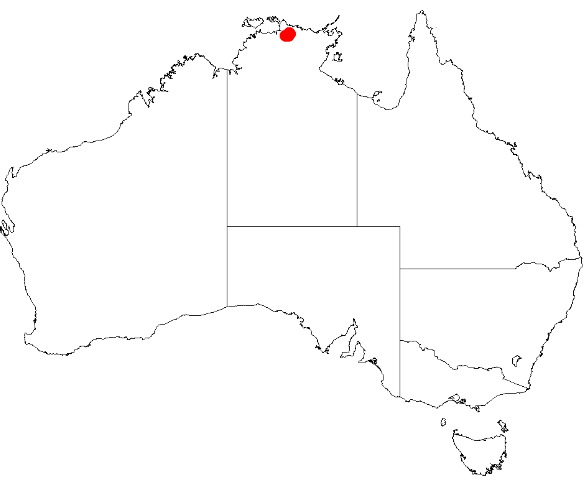
- Occurrence data from the ALA

Species of flowering plant

Pityrodia serrata is a species of flowering plant in the mint family Lamiaceae and is endemic to the northern part of the Northern Territory. It is an erect shrub with sharply-pointed, egg-shaped leaves with serrated edges, and off-white, bell-shaped flowers streaked with purple.

== Description ==
Pityrodia serrata is an erect shrub that typically grows to a height of up to 1 m (3 ft 3 in) and has branches densely covered with star-shaped hairs. The leaves are crowded in whorls of three, egg-shaped to oblong and sharply pointed, 5–13 mm (0.20–0.51 in) long, 2.0–3.5 mm (0.079–0.138 in) wide and sessile with serrated edges. The flowers are arranged singly in leaf axils on a pedicel about 1 mm (0.039 in) long. There are leaf-like bracts and lance-shaped bracteoles 5–7 mm (0.20–0.28 in) long at the base of the flowers. The sepals are 6.0–7.5 mm (0.24–0.30 in) long and joined for half their length forming a bell-shaped tube with five lance-shaped, sharply-pointed lobes. The five petals are off-white with purple streaks on the upper lip, 6–8 mm (0.24–0.31 in) long and joined to form a cylindrical tube with two "lips". The two upper lobes are 2.0–2.5 mm (0.079–0.098 in) long and the lower lip has three lobes, the lower middle lobe larger than the others. The four stamens extend slightly beyond the end of the tube, and are more or less of equal lengths. The fruit is oval, softly-hairy and 3.0–3.5 mm (0.12–0.14 in) long.

== Taxonomy and naming ==
Pityrodia serrata was first formally described in 1979 by Ahmad Abid Munir from a specimen collected near the Nabarlek mining camp in 1973. The description was published in Journal of the Adelaide Botanic Gardens. The specific epithet (serrata) means "saw-edged".

== Distribution ==
This pityrodia occurs in Arnhem Land in the northern part of the Northern Territory.

== Conservation ==
Pityrodia serrata is classified as "near threatened" under the Territory Parks and Wildlife Conservation Act 2000.
