= Pityrodia byrnesii =

Scientific classification
- Kingdom: Plantae
- Clade: Tracheophytes
- Clade: Angiosperms
- Clade: Eudicots
- Clade: Asterids
- Order: Lamiales
- Family: Lamiaceae
- Genus: Pityrodia
- Species: P. byrnesii

Binomial name
- Pityrodia byrnesii Munir
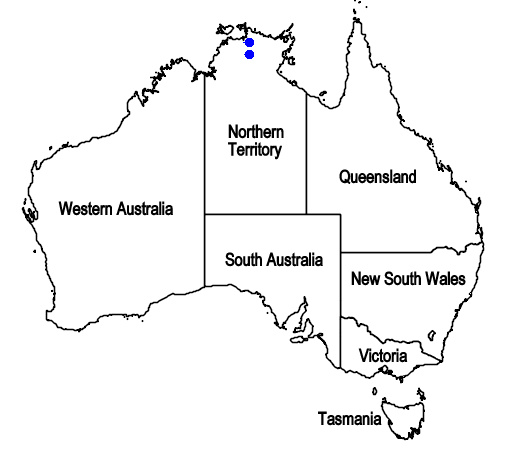
- Occurrence data from the ALA

Species of flowering plant

Pityrodia byrnesii is a flowering plant in the mint family Lamiaceae and is endemic to Arnhem Land in the Northern Territory. It is a shrub with hairy, glandular stems, stalkless, flat leaves and fragrant, off-white, bell-like flowers with purple stripes inside the tube.

== Description ==
Pityrodia byrnesii is a shrub which grows to a height of about 1 m (3 ft) and which has its branches densely covered with glands and hairs. The leaves are arranged in whorls of three along the branches and are 1.5–3 cm (0.6–1 in) long, 4–10 mm (0.2–0.4 in) wide. They are sticky due to glandular secretions, smooth on top with a distinct mid-rib on the lower surface.

The flowers are fragrant and are arranged singly on a sticky, hairy stalk less than 2 mm (0.08 in) long. The flowers are surrounded by leaf-like bracts and bracteoles which are oblong to lance-shaped, 6–11 mm (0.2–0.4 in) long and 1.5–2.5 mm (0.06–0.1 in) wide. The sepals are 8–12 mm (0.3–0.5 in) long and joined to form a bell-shaped tube with five lance-shaped lobes on the end. The lobes are lance-shaped, 4–7 mm (0.2–0.3 in) long, hairy and sticky outside, and hairy inside. The tube is 3–4.5 mm (0.1–0.2 in) and sticky and hairy outside, glabrous inside. The five petals are joined to form an almost cylindrical tube 11–13 mm (0.4–0.5 in) long with five lobes on the end. The tube is off-white in colour with deep purple streaks on the upper lip. The lobes form two "lips" - the upper one with two lobes and the lower one longer with three lobes. The lower central lobe is the largest, 4–5 mm (0.16–0.20 in) long and about 2 mm (0.08 in) wide. The four stamens extend slightly beyond the end of the tube, one pair slightly shorter than the other. Flowering occurs in most months and is followed by an oval-shaped, hairy, sticky fruit.

== Taxonomy and naming ==
Pityrodia byrnesii was first formally described in 1979 by Ahmad Abid Munir from a specimen collected near the East Alligator River crossing in the Northern Territory. The description was published in Journal of the Adelaide Botanic Gardens. The specific epithet ("byrnesii") honours Norman Byrnes, an Australian taxonomist.

== Distribution ==
This pityrodia occurs in Arnhem Land, near the East Alligator River, about 10 km (6 mi) south-west of Gunbalanya in the Kakadu National Park.

== Conservation ==
Pityrodia byrnesii is classified as "data deficient" under the Territory Parks and Wildlife Conservation Act 2000.
