= Pityrodia viscida =

Conservation status
- Priority Four — Rare Taxa (DEC)

Scientific classification
- Kingdom: Plantae
- Clade: Tracheophytes
- Clade: Angiosperms
- Clade: Eudicots
- Clade: Asterids
- Order: Lamiales
- Family: Lamiaceae
- Genus: Pityrodia
- Species: P. viscida

Binomial name
- Pityrodia viscida W.Fitzg.
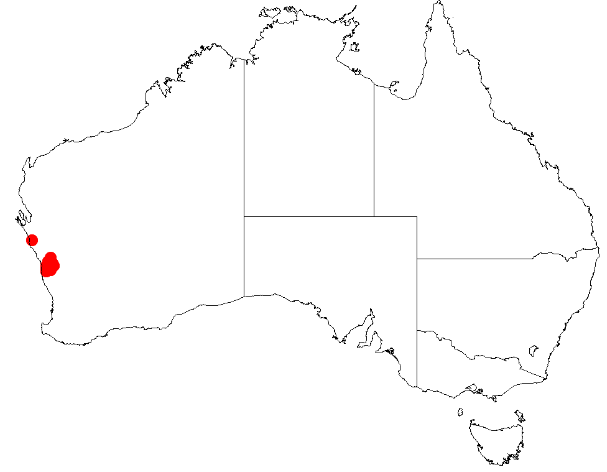
- Occurrence data from the ALA

Species of flowering plant

Pityrodia viscida is a flowering plant in the mint family Lamiaceae and is endemic to the south-west of Western Australia. It is an erect shrub with sticky hairy stems, egg-shaped to narrowly elliptic leaves and white bell-like flowers.

== Description ==
Pityrodia viscida is an erect shrub that typically grows to a height of 30–60 cm (12–24 in), its stems and branches covered with sticky hairs. The leaves are mostly arranged in opposite pairs, egg-shaped to narrowly ellipic, mostly 7–13 mm (0.28–0.51 in) long, 3–5 mm (0.12–0.20 in) wide and sessile. The upper surface of the leaves is glabrous and sticky, the lower surface covered with soft, yellowish-white hairs. The flowers are arranged singly in upper leaf axils, on a sticky, hairy pedicel 1–2 mm (0.039–0.079 in) long. The five sepals are 7–9 mm (0.28–0.35 in) long and joined for about half their length, with lance-shaped lobes 4–6 mm (0.16–0.24 in) long. The petals are white, 9–12 mm (0.35–0.47 in) long and joined at the base to form a gradually spreading upwards, with two "lips" with wavy or toothed edges. The lower lip has three lobes, the middle lobe broadly elliptic to more or less round, 5–6 mm (0.20–0.24 in) long and 4–5 mm (0.16–0.20 in) wide, the side lobes 3–5 mm (0.12–0.20 in) long. The two upper lobes are oblong and 4–6 mm (0.16–0.24 in) long. The four stamens extend beyond the end of the tube, the lower pair longer than the upper two. Flowering occurs from September to December or in January and February, and is followed by an oval, softly hairy fruit 3.5–5.0 mm (0.14–0.20 in) long.

== Taxonomy and naming ==
Pityrodia viscida was first formally described in 1918 by William Vincent Fitzgerald and the description was published in the Journal of the West Australian Natural History Society. The specific epithet (viscida) means "sticky", referring to the leaves and sepals.

== Distribution ==
This pityrodia grows in sandy laterite, mainly between Mingenew and Three Springs in the Avon Wheatbelt and Geraldton Sandplains bioregions of south-western Western Australia.

== Conservation ==
Pityrodia viscida is listed as "Priority Four" by the Government of Western Australia Department of Biodiversity, Conservation and Attractions, meaning that it is rare or near threatened.
