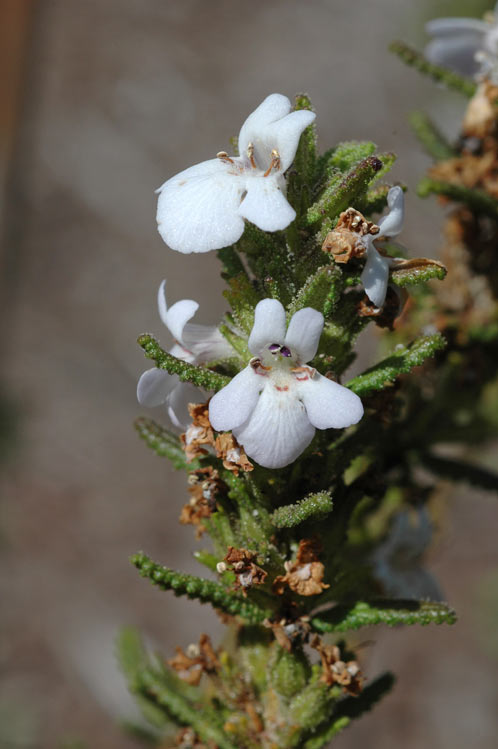
- In Kings Park, Perth

Scientific classification
- Kingdom: Plantae
- Clade: Tracheophytes
- Clade: Angiosperms
- Clade: Eudicots
- Clade: Asterids
- Order: Lamiales
- Family: Lamiaceae
- Genus: Pityrodia
- Species: P. scabra

Binomial name
- Pityrodia scabra A.S.George
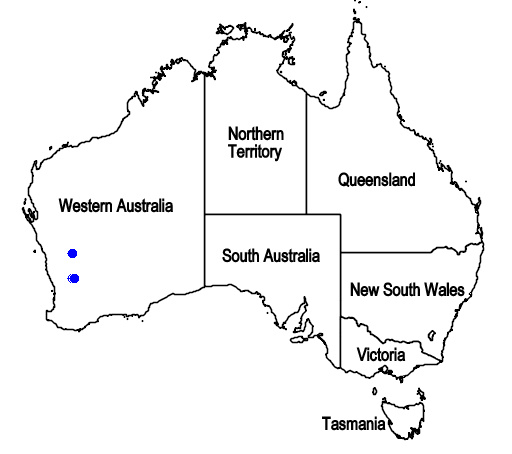
- Occurrence data from the Atlas of Living Australia

= Pityrodia scabra =

Species of flowering plant

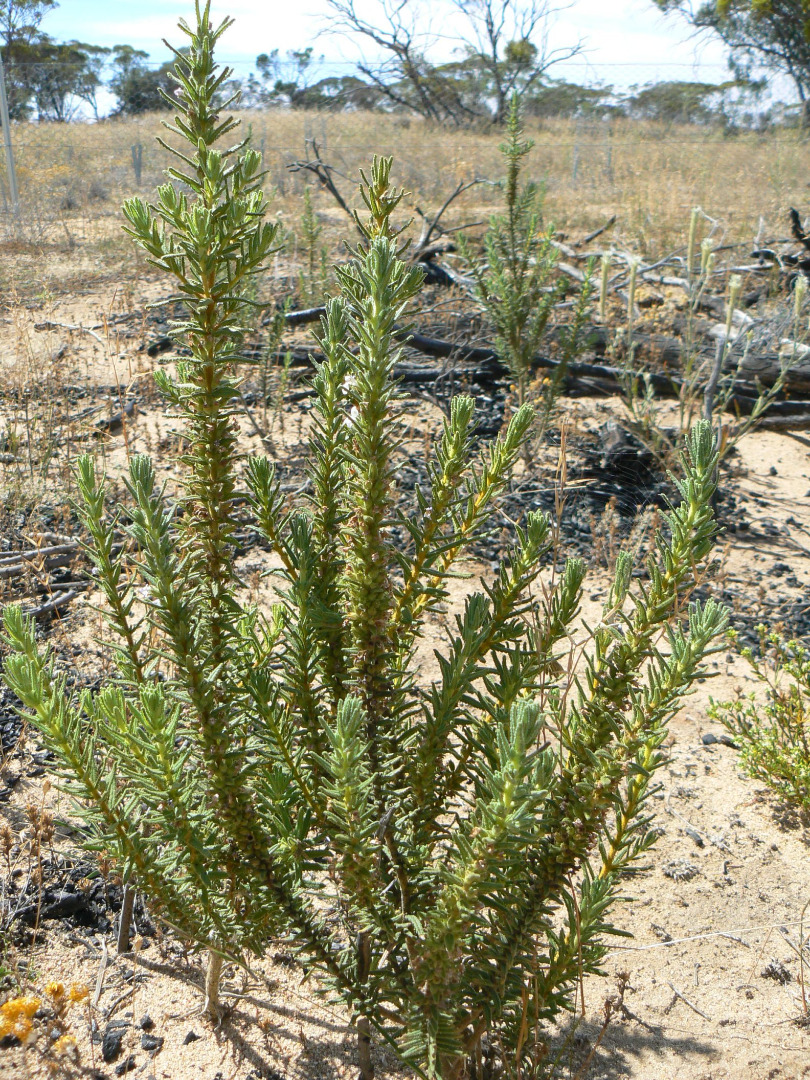
Habit

Pityrodia scabra is a species of flowering plant in the mint family Lamiaceae and is endemic to inland Western Australia. It is a sticky shrub with linear leaves arranged in whorls, and groups of about 7 to 9 white flowers.

== Description ==
Pityrodia scabra is a shrub that typically grows to a height of about 1 m (3 ft 3 in), its foliage covered with sticky, branched, golden hairs. The leaves are arranged in whorls of 3, linear 5–12 mm (0.20–0.47 in) long, 1–2 mm (0.039–0.079 in) wide and sessile. The edges of the leaves are rolled under and more or less scalloped, the upper surface becoming rough with age. The flowers are arranged in leaf axils in groups of about 7 to 9, with linear bracteoles 2–3 mm (0.079–0.118 in) long at the base. The sepals are joined at the base to form a tube 4–5 mm (0.16–0.20 in) long, with 5 lobes 2.0–2.5 mm (0.079–0.098 in) long. The five petals are white, 7–8 mm (0.28–0.31 in) long and joined to form a tube with two "lips", the upper lip with two lobes and the lower lip with three, the middle lobe larger than the others. The four stamens extend slightly beyond the end of the petal tube. Flowering occurs in October and November and is followed by oval, softly-hairy fruit 2–3 mm (0.079–0.118 in) long.

== Taxonomy and naming ==
Pityrodia scabra was first formally described in 1967 by Alex George from a specimen collected near Cowcowing, and the description was published in the Journal of the Royal Society of Western Australia. The specific epithet (scabra) means "scabrous" or "rough", referring to the surface of the leaves.

In 2012, Kelly Anne Shepherd described two subspecies of P. scabra in Australian Systematic Botany, and the names are accepted by the Australian Plant Census:

- Pityrodia scabra subsp. dendrotricha K.A.Sheph.
- Pityrodia scabra A.S.George subsp. scabra

== Distribution ==
This pityrodia occurs in the Avon Wheatbelt, Coolgardie and Mallee bioregions of inland Western Australia.

== Conservation ==
Pityrodia scabra is classified as "not threatened" by the Government of Western Australia Department of Biodiversity, Conservation and Attractions.
