= Pityrodia chrysocalyx =

Conservation status
- Priority Three — Poorly Known Taxa (DEC)

Scientific classification
- Kingdom: Plantae
- Clade: Tracheophytes
- Clade: Angiosperms
- Clade: Eudicots
- Clade: Asterids
- Order: Lamiales
- Family: Lamiaceae
- Genus: Pityrodia
- Species: P. chrysocalyx

Binomial name
- Pityrodia chrysocalyx (F.Muell.) C.A.Gardner
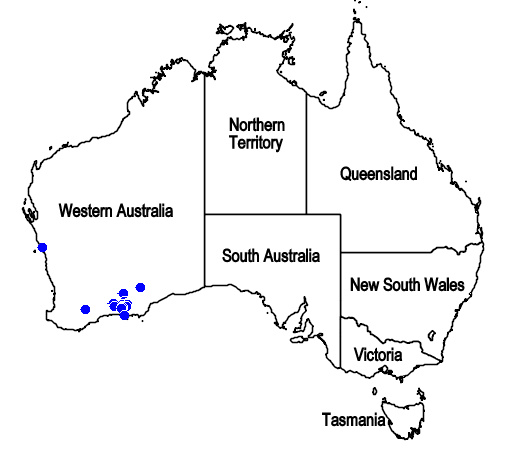
- Occurrence data from the Atlas of Living Australia

Species of flowering plant

Pityrodia chrysocalyx is a flowering plant in the mint family Lamiaceae and is endemic to the south-west of Western Australia. It is an erect, bushy shrub with small, glossy leaves, and flowers with white petals and a golden-yellow calyx.

== Description ==
Pityrodia chrysocalyx is an erect, bushy, compact shrub which grows to a height of 30–75 cm (10–30 in) with its branches densely covered with reddish yellow, circular scales. Its leaves are glossy green, egg-shaped 2–6 cm (0.8–2 in) long, 1–3 mm (0.04–0.1 in) wide and usually scattered in groups of three along the stems. The flowers are arranged singly in upper leaf axils on a very short stalk. There is a leaf-like bract and minute bracteoles at the base of the flower. The five sepals are joined to form a golden-coloured, bell-shaped tube 5–7 mm (0.2–0.3 in) long, scaly on the outside but glabrous inside. The five petals are joined to form a white tube 9–12 mm (0.4–0.5 in) long with five lobes on the end. The tube is wider at the top end and the lower, middle lobe is broad elliptic to almost circular, 3–5 mm (0.1–0.2 in) broad and long while the other four lobes are slightly smaller and roughly similar in size and shape to each other. The petal tube has a few soft hairs on the outside but glabrous inside apart from a densely hairy ring above the ovary and a few hairs on the large petal lobe. Flowering occurs from July to October and is followed by a hairy, oval fruit 4–5 mm (0.16–0.20 in) long with the sepals attached.

== Taxonomy and naming ==
This species was first formally described in 1876 by Ferdinand von Mueller who gave it the name Depremesnilia chrysocalyx and published the description in Fragmenta phytographiae Australiae. In 1931, Charles Gardner changed the name to Pityrodia chrysocalyx. The specific epithet (chrysocalyx) is derived from Ancient Greek words meaning "gold" and "cup", (to give "golden-cupped") referring to the colour of the sepal tube.

== Distribution and habitat ==
This pityrodia grows in sandy loam in open woodland mainly between Esperance, Norseman, Lake Meads and Pyramid Lake in the Coolgardie and Mallee biogeographic regions.

== Conservation ==
Pityrodia chrysocalyx is classified as "Priority Three" by the Western Australian Government Department of Parks and Wildlife, meaning that it is poorly known and known from only a few locations but is not under imminent threat.
