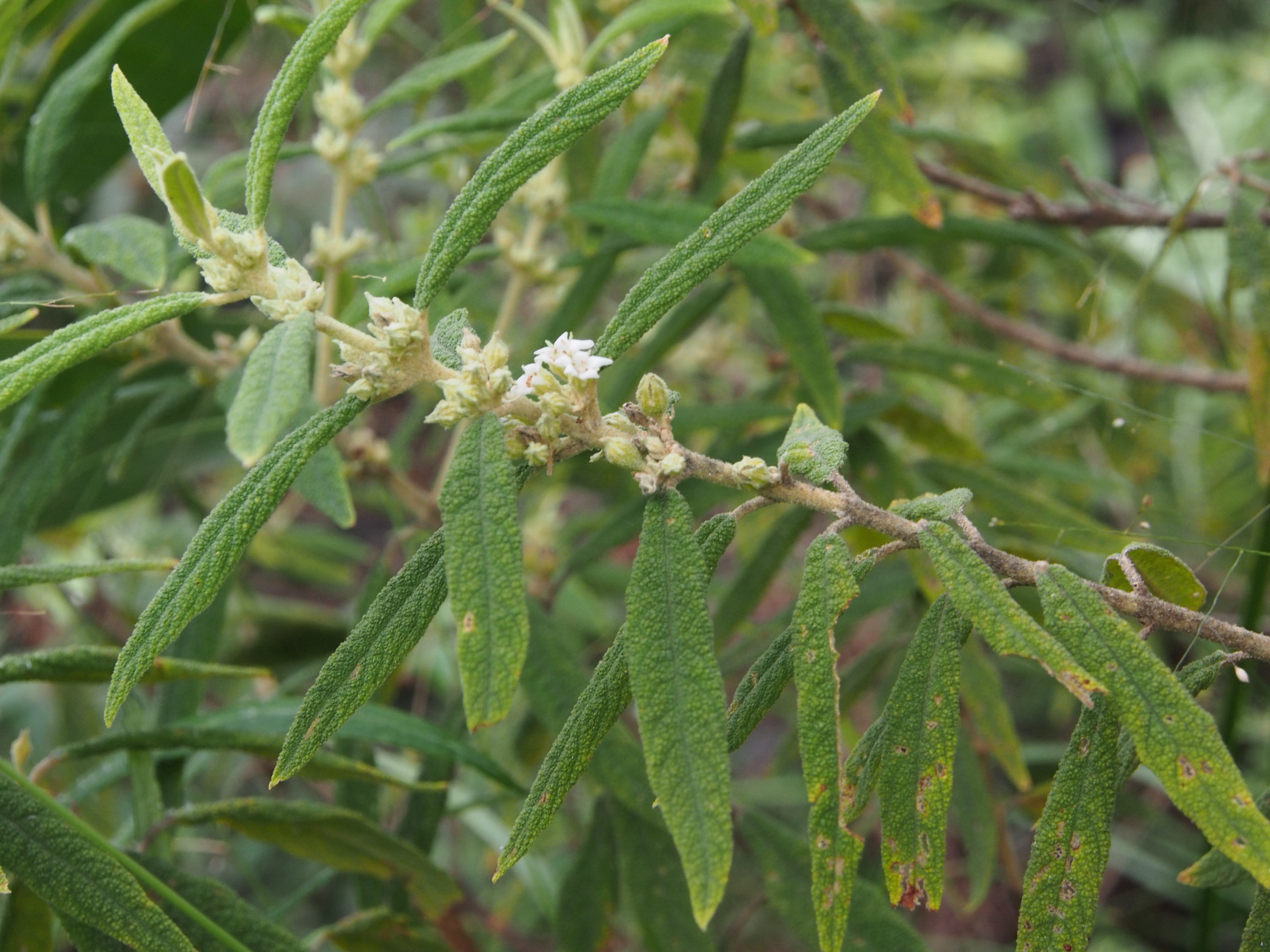
- Near Paluma

Scientific classification
- Kingdom: Plantae
- Clade: Tracheophytes
- Clade: Angiosperms
- Clade: Eudicots
- Clade: Asterids
- Order: Lamiales
- Family: Lamiaceae
- Genus: Pityrodia
- Species: P. salviifolia

Binomial name
- Pityrodia salviifolia R.Br.
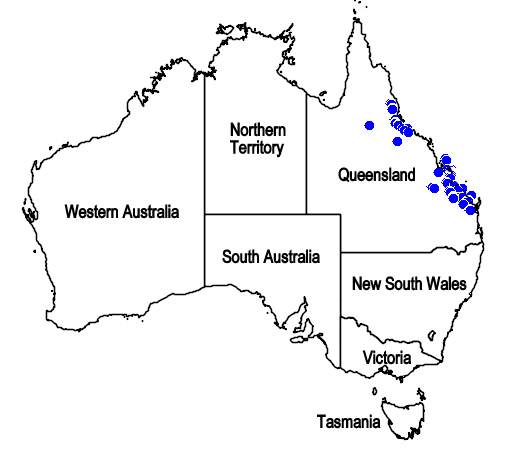
- Occurrence data from the ALA

Synonyms
- Chloanthes salvifolia F.Muell. orth. var.; Chloanthes salviifolia (R.Br.) F.Muell.; Pityrodia salvifolia R.Br. orth. var.; Premna salvifolia Spreng. orth. var.; Premna salviifolia (R.Br.) Spreng.

= Pityrodia salviifolia =

Species of flowering plant

Pityrodia salviifolia is a flowering plant in the mint family Lamiaceae and is endemic to Queensland. It is an erect, spreading shrub with aromatic, wrinkled or corrugated leaves and clusters of small flowers with white petals. It is mostly found in wet forests in coastal north Queensland.

== Description ==
Pityrodia salviifolia is an erect, spreading shrub which usually grows to a height of 2.5 m (8 ft) and which has its branches and leaves densely covered with silvery, shield-shaped scales. The leaves are lance-shaped, wrinkled or corrugated, 60–100 cm (20–40 in) long and 10–20 mm (0.4–0.8 in) wide, and have a petiole about 1 mm (0.04 in) long. The flowers are arranged in clusters of between five and ten in upper leaf axils and are almost stalkless, surrounded by scaly, leaf-like bracts 3–5 mm (0.1–0.2 in) long and smaller bracteoles. The five sepals are 4–6 mm (0.16–0.24 in) long and form a tube for about half their length. The five petals are white and at 5–7 mm (0.2–0.3 in) long are only slightly longer than the sepals. The petals form a bell-shaped tube with three lobes slightly larger than the other two. There are four stamens, with two slightly longer than the other pair, the longer pair about the same length or slightly shorter than the petal tube. The fruit is a hairy, oval-shaped capsule with the sepals attached.

== Taxonomy and naming ==
Pityrodia salviifolia was first formally described in 1810 by Robert Brown and the description was published in the Prodromus Florae Novae Hollandiae et Insulae Van Diemen. The specific epithet (salviifolia) is derived from the Latin words salvia meaning "sage" and -folium meaning "-leaved".

== Distribution and habitat ==
This pityrodia mostly occurs between Bundaberg and Cairns where it mostly grows in wet forest, sometimes in or near rainforest.
