= Karl Friedrich Wilhelm Jessen =

German botanist

Karl Friedrich Wilhelm Jessen (15 September 1821, in Schleswig – 27 May 1889, in Berlin) was a German botanist.

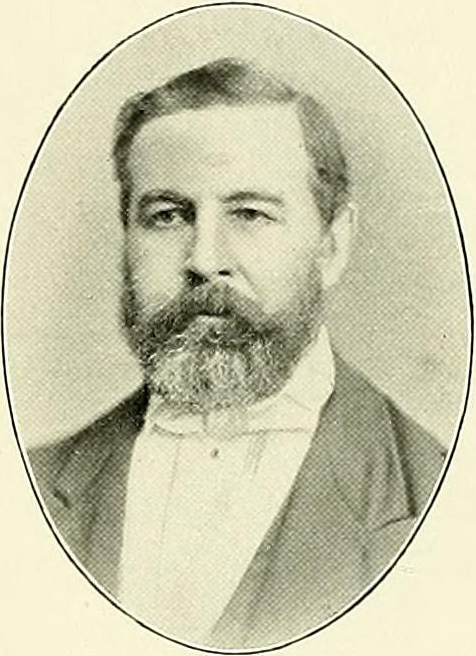
Karl Friedrich Wilhelm Jessen

He studied botany and natural sciences at the University of Kiel, where he obtained his doctorate in 1848. He received his habilitation in Berlin in 1851, afterwards teaching classes at the University of Greifswald, and during the same time period, giving lectures at the agricultural college in Eldena. In 1868 he became an associate professor at Greifswald. Following closure of the Eldena agricultural college in 1877, he relocated to the University of Berlin as a professor of botany.

He specialized in the fields of floristics and botanical history. In addition to his own writings, he completed Georg August Pritzel's "Die deutschen Volksnamen der Pflanzen" (The German common names of plants, 1882–84).

The plant genus Jessenia from the family Arecaceae is named after him.

== Selected writings ==
- Prasiolae : generis algarum monographia, 1848
- Was heißt Botanik? : Ein Vortrag gehalten zu Greifswald, den 15. December 1860, 1861
- Deutschlands Gräser und Getreidearten 1863 - German grasses and cereals.
- Botanik der Gegenwart und Vorzeit in culturhistorischer Entwickelung, 1864 - Botany of the present and past in cultural-historical development.
- Deutsche Excursions-Flora, 1879.
