= Pityrodia lanuginosa =

Scientific classification
- Kingdom: Plantae
- Clade: Tracheophytes
- Clade: Angiosperms
- Clade: Eudicots
- Clade: Asterids
- Order: Lamiales
- Family: Lamiaceae
- Genus: Pityrodia
- Species: P. lanuginosa

Binomial name
- Pityrodia lanuginosa Munir
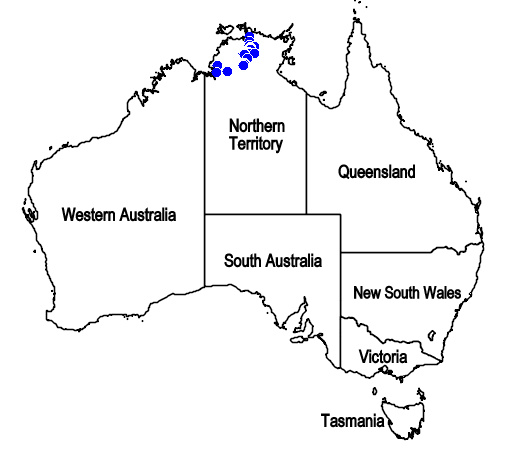
- Occurrence data from the ALA

Species of flowering plant

Pityrodia lanuginosa is a flowering plant in the mint family Lamiaceae and is endemic to Arnhem Land in the Northern Territory. It is a woolly, spreading shrub with its leaves arranged in four rows and off-white, bell-like flowers with dark purple streaks.

== Description ==
Pityrodia lanuginosa is a spreading shrub which grows to a height of about 30 cm (10 in) and has branches densely covered with woolly hairs. The leaves are narrow egg-shaped to lance-shaped, usually 10–20 cm (4–8 in) long, 3–5 mm (0.1–0.2 in) wide, mostly smooth on the upper surface and have prominent veins on the lower surface.

The flowers are arranged singly in upper leaf axils with leaf-like bracts and leafy, narrow lance-shaped bracteoles 3–7 mm (0.1–0.3 in) long at their base. The sepals are joined for about half their length to form a bell-shaped tube with five lance-shaped, slightly hairy lobes 5–7 mm (0.2–0.3 in) long. The five petals are off-white, 7–9 mm (0.3–0.4 in) long and joined to form a bell-shaped tube with five lobes on the end. The two upper lobes have dark purple streaks and are about 3 mm (0.1 in) long and the lower middle lobe is larger than the others. The petal tube and lobes are mostly glabrous apart from a dense hairy ring below the stamens. The four stamens extend beyond the end of the tube, the lower pair slightly longer than the other one. Flowering occurs mainly from January to June and is followed by an oval-shaped, hairy, fruit 3–4.5 mm (0.1–0.2 in) long and about 2 mm (0.08 in) wide.

== Taxonomy and naming ==
Pityrodia lanuginosa was first formally described in 1979 by Ahmad Abid Munir from a specimen collected near El Sharana in Arnhem Land. The description was published in Journal of the Adelaide Botanic Gardens.

== Distribution ==
This pityrodia occurs in Arnhem Land including in the Kakadu National Park and Nitmiluk National Park.

== Conservation ==
Pityrodia lanuginosa is classified as "least concern" under the Territory Parks and Wildlife Conservation Act 2000.
