= DigiVol =

Australian online citizen science platform

- Website type: Citizen science, museum digitisation
- Available in: English
- Owner: Australian Museum
- Website: volunteer.ala.org.au
- Commercial: No
- Registration: Required to contribute
- Launched: 2011
- Current status: Active

DigiVol is an Australian online citizen science platform, developed by the Australian Museum in partnership with the Atlas of Living Australia, that enables volunteers to digitise museum and research collection records by transcribing information from specimen labels, field notebooks, archival documents and other collection records.

Launched in 2011, DigiVol grew from earlier research into volunteer-based collection digitisation. Originally developed for natural history collections, it has expanded to support projects from museums, herbaria, universities and other research organisations involving biodiversity, palaeontology, cultural collections and archival records.

DigiVol has contributed to scientific research by enabling the large-scale digitisation and analysis of museum collections, and has itself become the subject of research into online volunteering, citizen science and museum digitisation. It has been recognised as an innovative model for engaging volunteers in cultural and scientific institutions.

== History ==
=== Development ===
The origins of DigiVol can be traced to investigations undertaken by the Australian Museum during 2007–2008 into methods for accelerating the digitisation of its natural history collections. At the time, many millions of specimens remained undigitised, with their associated information recorded only on handwritten labels and in collection registers, making large-scale digitisation impractical. Trials examined volunteer-assisted photography, transcription and georeferencing, as well as outsourced data entry, to identify efficient workflows for large-scale digitisation.

The trials demonstrated the value of an image-based workflow, which became the basis for the museum's subsequent volunteer digitisation program.

In partnership with the Atlas of Living Australia, the Australian Museum developed DigiVol, which was launched in 2011 as an online platform for the transcription of specimen labels and other collection records from digital images.

=== Expansion ===
By 2012, DigiVol had expanded beyond its initial entomology projects to support the digitisation of malacology collections, registers, journals and publications. The workflow was subsequently adapted for the museum's palaeontology collection, demonstrating that DigiVol had evolved into a general-purpose digitisation system suitable for a wide range of collections.

DigiVol subsequently expanded to support projects from museums, herbaria, universities and other research organisations in Australia and overseas. The platform has been described as an innovative model of online volunteering and citizen science.

== Operation ==
DigiVol is an online citizen science platform that enables volunteers to assist museums, herbaria and other research institutions by digitising collection records. Participants contribute remotely through web-based projects, known as expeditions, in which they transcribe information from images of specimen labels, field notebooks, collection registers, photographs and other archival material.

Although initially developed for natural history collections, DigiVol now supports projects involving biological, geological and cultural collections, as well as archival documents, scientific publications and camera-trap images.

== Digitisation workflow ==
DigiVol uses an image-based workflow in which museum specimens, labels and associated documentation are photographed before transcription. Museum specimen labels frequently contain handwritten text, historical place names, obsolete taxonomy and inconsistent abbreviations, making automated transcription unreliable and requiring human interpretation. By creating a permanent digital record, the workflow enables information to be transcribed and verified from digital images, eliminating the need for repeated handling of the original material.

The workflow comprises two stages: image capture in the DigiVol Lab, followed by online transcription through DigiVol expeditions.

=== DigiVol Lab ===
Image capture is undertaken in the Australian Museum's DigiVol Lab, an on-site digitisation facility, where volunteers work with museum staff to create digital records of collection specimens, objects and archival material. Volunteers photograph specimens, labels and associated documentation, record collection metadata, and prepare digital images for use in DigiVol's online transcription platform. The work is carried out in collaboration with collection staff and forms the first stage of DigiVol's two-stage digitisation workflow.

=== Expeditions ===
Once images have been captured, they are uploaded as DigiVol expeditions, where online volunteers transcribe specimen labels, field notebooks and other collection records. Completed transcriptions are reviewed before being incorporated into institutional collection management systems and, where appropriate, shared through biodiversity data portals such as the Atlas of Living Australia and the Global Biodiversity Information Facility.

== Impact ==
DigiVol has been adopted by museums, herbaria, universities and other research organisations in Australia and internationally to support the digitisation of natural history and cultural collections.

The platform has enabled volunteers to transcribe millions of specimen labels, archival records and other collection documents, increasing the amount of biodiversity and collection data available through institutional databases and biodiversity aggregators.

== Research ==
=== Research enabled by DigiVol ===
DigiVol has contributed to scientific research by enabling the large-scale transcription and analysis of museum and research collections that would otherwise have been impractical to process. Volunteer transcriptions have supported studies using natural history and archival collections, including projects that have generated peer-reviewed publications.

One example is the Date a Fossil project, in which DigiVol volunteers examined more than 25,000 scanning electron microscope (SEM) images to identify fossil pollen and spores. The resulting data were used to determine the age and palaeoenvironment of the McGraths Flat fossil deposit. The study concluded that combining automated image acquisition with citizen scientists provided an effective approach for investigating fossil sites that cannot readily be analysed using traditional laboratory methods.

=== Research on DigiVol ===
DigiVol has been the subject of research into online volunteering, citizen science and museum digitisation. Studies have examined volunteer motivation, recruitment, engagement and retention, and the contribution of crowdsourcing to museum digitisation. DigiVol has been cited as an example of a successful model for combining on-site and online volunteering in cultural institutions.

== Volunteers ==
Unlike traditional museum volunteering, DigiVol enables volunteers to contribute remotely, allowing participation regardless of geographic location or proximity to a museum. The platform combines on-site and online volunteering, broadening opportunities for people to contribute to museum digitisation and citizen science.

Volunteers undertake a wide variety of projects, including the transcription of specimen labels, field notebooks, archival documents and other collection records. As participants gain experience, they may contribute to increasingly specialised or complex digitisation projects. Experienced volunteers often develop specialised expertise in interpreting historical specimen labels and collection records.

Research has shown that volunteers participate for a range of reasons, including contributing to science and cultural heritage, learning new skills, personal interest, and the opportunity to participate in meaningful online volunteering.

== Recognition ==
DigiVol has been recognised as an innovative model for online volunteering and museum digitisation. It has been featured by organisations promoting citizen science and environmental volunteering, including SciStarter and the New South Wales Government's citizen science program.

During the COVID-19 pandemic, DigiVol experienced a substantial increase in participation as people sought opportunities to volunteer remotely. In 2020, the Australian Broadcasting Corporation reported a surge in volunteer activity, highlighting the platform's ability to engage volunteers who were unable to participate in traditional museum-based programs.

== See also ==
- Citizen science
- Atlas of Living Australia
- iDigBio
- Zooniverse
