= Pityrodia puberula =

Scientific classification
- Kingdom: Plantae
- Clade: Tracheophytes
- Clade: Angiosperms
- Clade: Eudicots
- Clade: Asterids
- Order: Lamiales
- Family: Lamiaceae
- Genus: Pityrodia
- Species: P. puberula

Binomial name
- Pityrodia puberula Munir
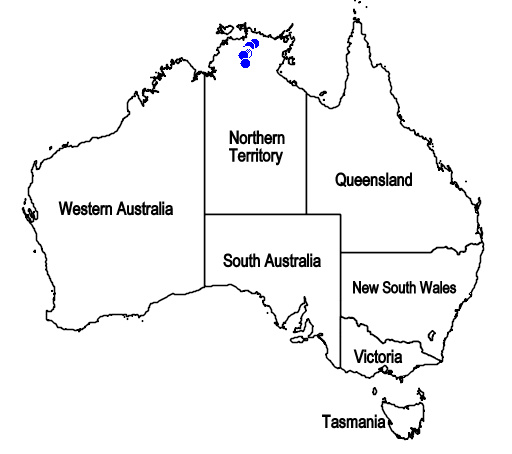
- Occurrence data from the ALA

Species of flowering plant

Pityrodia puberula is a flowering plant in the mint family Lamiaceae and is endemic to Arnhem Land in the Northern Territory. It is a straggling shrub with narrow, hairy leaves arranged in four rows and off-white, bell-like flowers with dark purple streaks.

== Description ==
Pityrodia puberula is a straggling shrub which grows to a height of about 50 cm (20 in) and has branches densely covered with star-like hairs. The leaves are hairy, linear to narrow lance-shaped, usually 10–35 mm (0.39–1.4 in) long, 3–6 mm (0.1–0.2 in) wide, mostly smooth on the upper surface and have a raised midvein on the lower surface. The flowers are arranged singly in upper leaf axils with leaf-like bracts and leafy, narrow lance-shaped bracteoles 3–6 mm (0.12–0.24 in) long at their base. The sepals are joined for less than half their length to form a bell-shaped tube with five lance-shaped, hairy lobes 7–8 mm (0.28–0.31 in) long. The five petals are off-white, 10–13 mm (0.4–0.5 in) long and joined to form a bell-like tube with five lobes on the end. The two upper lobes have dark purple streaks and are 3–4 mm (0.12–0.16 in) long and smaller than the lower lobes. The lower middle lobe is larger than the others. The outer part of the petal tube and lobes are hairy and there is a dense hairy ring below the stamens. The four stamens extend slightly beyond the end of the tube, the lower pair slightly longer than the other one. Flowering occurs mainly from February to June and is followed by an oval-shaped, slightly wrinkled fruit 3–4 mm (0.12–0.16 in) long and about 2 mm (0.08 in) wide.

== Taxonomy and naming ==
Pityrodia puberula was first formally described in 1979 by Ahmad Abid Munir from a specimen collected near Mount Cahill in Arnhem Land. The description was published in Journal of the Adelaide Botanic Gardens.

== Distribution ==
This pityrodia occurs in Arnhem Land including in the Kakadu National Park and Nitmiluk National Park .

== Conservation ==
Pityrodia puberula is classified as "least concern" under the Territory Parks and Wildlife Conservation Act 2000.
