= Pityrodia spenceri =

Scientific classification
- Kingdom: Plantae
- Clade: Tracheophytes
- Clade: Angiosperms
- Clade: Eudicots
- Clade: Asterids
- Order: Lamiales
- Family: Lamiaceae
- Genus: Pityrodia
- Species: P. spenceri

Binomial name
- Pityrodia spenceri Munir
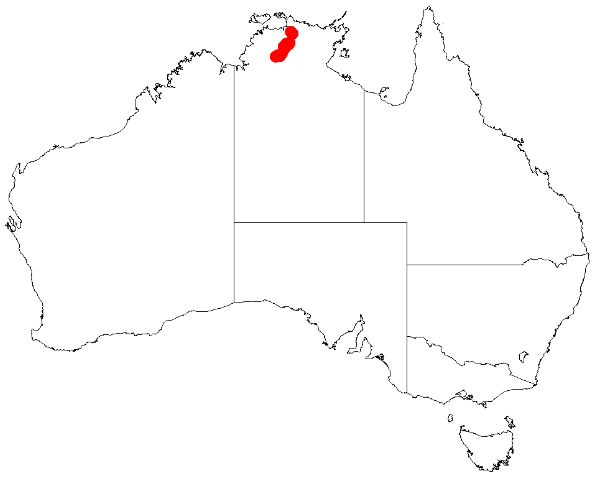
- Occurrence data from the ALA

Species of flowering plant

Pityrodia spenceri is a species of flowering plant in the mint family Lamiaceae and is endemic to the northern part of the Northern Territory. It is an erect shrub with hairy, heart-shaped or egg-shaped leaves, and white, tube-shaped flowers.

== Description ==
Pityrodia spenceri is an erect shrub that has its branches densely covered with woolly, ash-coloured, branched hairs. The leaves are arranged in whorls of three or scattered, heart-shaped to egg-shaped with a point on the end, mostly 10–20 mm (0.39–0.79 in) long and 5–8 mm (0.20–0.31 in) wide on a short petiole, or more or less sessile. The leaves are densely covered with branched, ash-coloured hairs. The flowers are sessile and arranged singly in leaf axils. There are leaf-like bracts and linear bracteoles 3.5–5 mm (0.14–0.20 in) long at the base of the flowers. The sepals are 7–8 mm (0.28–0.31 in) long and joined at the base forming a bell-shaped to top-shaped tube with five lance-shaped lobes 4–5 mm (0.16–0.20 in) long. The five petals are white, 8–10 mm (0.31–0.39 in) long and joined at the base to form a more or less cylindrical tube with two "lips". The upper lip is about 3 mm (0.12 in) long and the other four are narrowly egg-shaped or oblong and about 2 mm (0.079 in) long. The fruit is oval, softly-hairy and 3–4 mm (0.12–0.16 in) long.

== Taxonomy and naming ==
Pityrodia spenceri was first formally described in 1979 by Ahmad Abid Munir from specimens collected by Walter Baldwin Spencer and others near Edith Creek in 1911. The description was published in Journal of the Adelaide Botanic Gardens.

== Distribution ==
This pityrodia occurs in the Kakadu and Nitmiluk National Parks in the northern part of the Northern Territory.

== Conservation ==
Pityrodia spenceri is listed as "least concern" under the Territory Parks and Wildlife Conservation Act 2000.
