= Pityrodia jamesii =

Scientific classification
- Kingdom: Plantae
- Clade: Tracheophytes
- Clade: Angiosperms
- Clade: Eudicots
- Clade: Asterids
- Order: Lamiales
- Family: Lamiaceae
- Genus: Pityrodia
- Species: P. jamesii

Binomial name
- Pityrodia jamesii Specht
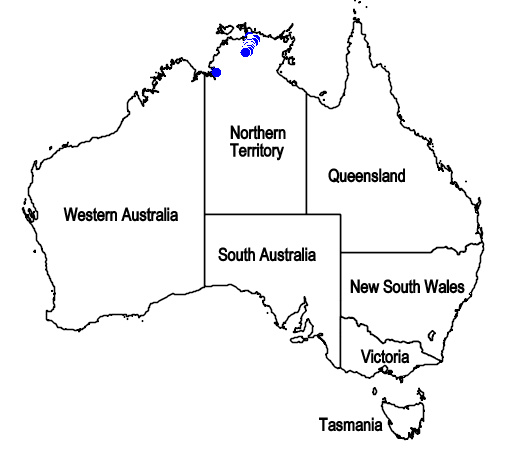
- Occurrence data from the ALA

Species of flowering plant

Pityrodia jamesii is a flowering plant in the mint family Lamiaceae and is endemic to Arnhem Land in the Northern Territory, Australia. It is a spreading shrub with hairy, yellowish brown stems, sticky, hairy, egg-shaped to lance-shaped leaves and white, bell-like flowers.

== Description ==
Pityrodia jamesii is a spreading, hairy shrub which grows to a height of about 0.5–1.82 m (1.6–6.0 ft), its branches covered with yellowish hairs. The leaves are lance-shaped to egg-shaped, sticky when young, mostly 15–35 mm (0.59–1.4 in) long and 3–8 mm (0.1–0.3 in) wide with the edges rolled under. They are crowded near the ends of the branches and are hairy and glandular with raised veins on the underside.

The flowers are arranged in the upper leaf axils with bracts and smaller bracteoles. The five sepals are joined at the base and form a bell-shaped tube that is glandular and hairy on the outside and glabrous inside. The petals are white 8–12 mm (0.31–0.47 in) long and joined for about half their length to form a bell shaped tube with five lobes on the end. The lower three lobes are free from each other, 3.5–6 mm (0.1–0.2 in) long, 2–4 mm (0.08–0.2 in) wide and the upper two lobes are 5–8 mm (0.2–0.3 in) long, about 2.5 mm (0.098 in) wide and joined for most of their length. The four stamens extend slightly beyond the end of the tube, one pair slightly shorter than the other. Flowering occurs in most months and is followed by on oval, hairy fruit 3–4 mm (0.12–0.16 in) long and 2.3 mm (0.091 in) wide.

== Taxonomy and naming ==
Pityrodia jamesii was first formally described in 1979 by Raymond Specht from a specimen collected from sandstone hills near Gunbalanya, Northern Territory during the third American-Australian Scientific Expedition to Arnhem Land in 1951. The description was published in Records of the American-Australian Scientific Expedition to Arnhem Land No. 3 Botany and Plant Ecology. The specific epithet (jamesii) honours Stewart James who assisted with collection of specimens and was an agricultural advisor.

== Distribution ==
This pityrodia occurs in Arnhem Land, especially near the East and South Alligator Rivers.

== Ecology ==
It is one of the only food plants of the Leichhardt grasshopper.

== Conservation ==
Pityrodia byrnesii is classified as "least concern" under the Territory Parks and Wildlife Conservation Act 2000.
