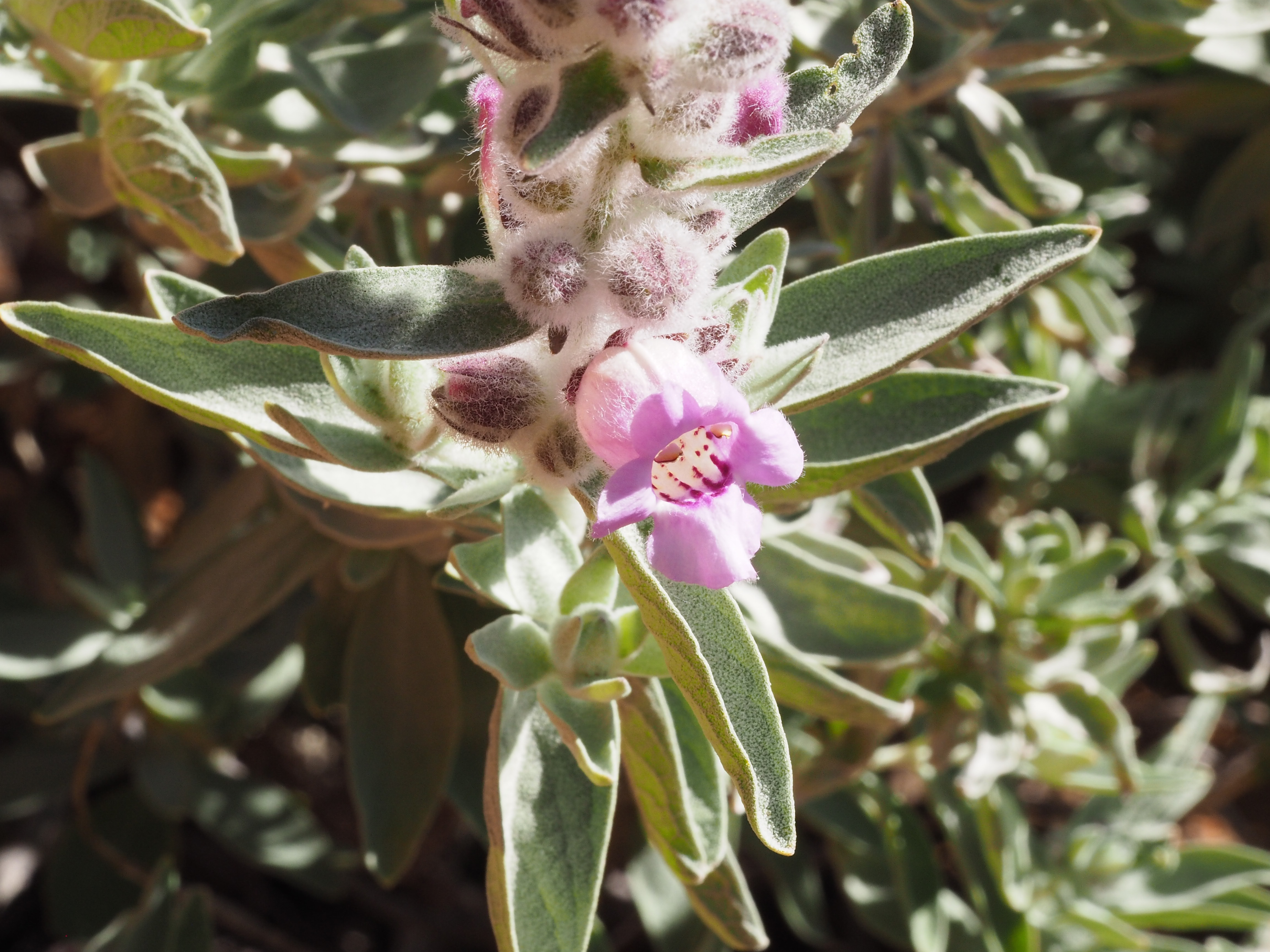
- Pityrodia augustensis leaves and flowers

Conservation status
- Vulnerable (EPBC Act)

Scientific classification
- Kingdom: Plantae
- Clade: Tracheophytes
- Clade: Angiosperms
- Clade: Eudicots
- Clade: Asterids
- Order: Lamiales
- Family: Lamiaceae
- Genus: Pityrodia
- Species: P. augustensis

Binomial name
- Pityrodia augustensis Munir
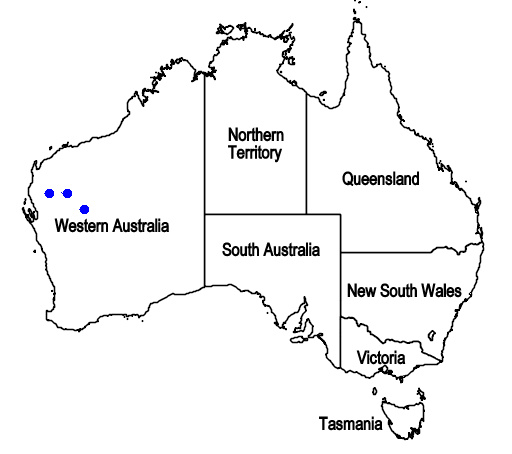
- Occurrence data from the ALA

= Pityrodia augustensis =

Mt. Augustus foxglove

Species of flowering plant

Pityrodia augustensis, commonly known as Mount Augustus foxglove, is a flowering plant in the mint family Lamiaceae and is endemic to a small area in Western Australia. It is a small, bushy shrub with its branches, leaves and some of its flower parts densely covered with woolly hairs. It is similar to the lovely foxglove (Dasymalla axillaris) and the sandplain foxglove (Dasymalla terminalis) but has very different leaves from those species.

== Description ==
Pityrodia augustensis is a bushy shrub which grows to a height of about 1 m (3 ft) and which has its branches densely covered with greenish-white branched hairs. The leaves are arranged in opposite pairs along the branches and are 3–6 cm (1–2 in) long, 6–15 mm (0.2–0.6 in) wide, narrow elliptic in shape and wedge-shaped at both ends. They are densely covered with a matted layer of woolly hairs.

The flowers are arranged singly or in groups of up to five on woolly stalks, usually 2–5 mm (0.08–0.2 in) long the groups up to 5–15 cm (2–6 in) long. Each flower is surrounded by woolly bracts and bracteoles. The sepals are a deep purple-lilac colour, mostly woolly-hairy and are 9–12 mm (0.4–0.5 in) long forming a short tube near their base. The petals are a deep lilac colour and form a broad tube 18–25 mm (0.7–1 in) long with two "lips" - the upper one with two lobes and the lower one with three lobes. The tube is sparsely hairy on the outside and mostly glabrous on the inside. The four stamens are usually enclosed within the tube, one pair shorter than the others. Flowering occurs from August to October and is followed by a more or less spherical fruit surrounded by the sepals.

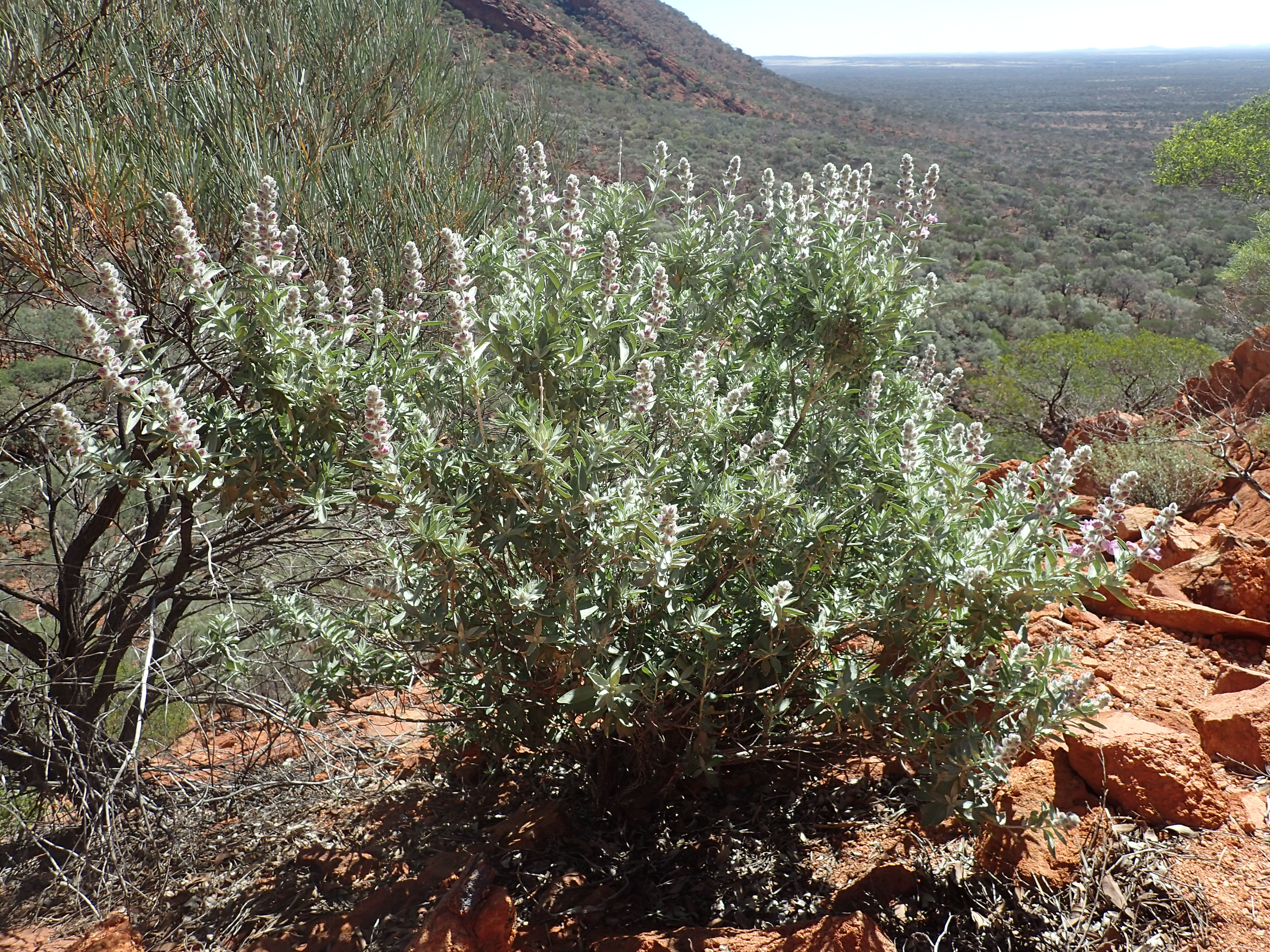
Pityrodia augustensis in the Mount Augustus National Park

This species is similar to P. axillaris but that species has a deep red or scarlet petal tube which is almost glabrous on the outside. It also resembles P. terminalis which, however has elongated elliptic leaves which are more or less stem-clasping at the base.

== Taxonomy and naming ==
Pityrodia augustensis was first formally described in 1979 by Ahmad Abid Munir from a specimen collected on the northern slopes of Mount Augustus, and the description was published in Journal of the Adelaide Botanic Gardens. The specific epithet (augustensis) refers to the location of the type specimen.

== Distribution and habitat ==
This pityrodia grows on rocky hillsides in the Mount Augustus National Park and on Mount Fraser in the Robinson Ranges near Meekatharra, in the Gascoyne biogeographic region.

== Conservation ==
Pityrodia augustensis is classified as "vulnerable" under the Environment Protection and Biodiversity Conservation Act 1999 and as "Threatened Flora (Declared Rare Flora — Extant)" by the Department of Environment and Conservation (Western Australia) meaning that it is likely to become extinct or is rare, or otherwise in need of special protection. The main threats to its survival are grazing and, in the case of some populations, mining activities.
