= Pityrodia pungens =

Scientific classification
- Kingdom: Plantae
- Clade: Tracheophytes
- Clade: Angiosperms
- Clade: Eudicots
- Clade: Asterids
- Order: Lamiales
- Family: Lamiaceae
- Genus: Pityrodia
- Species: P. pungens

Binomial name
- Pityrodia pungens Munir
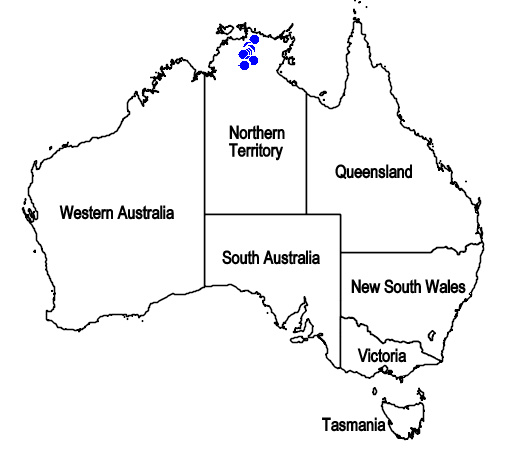
- Occurrence data from the ALA

Species of flowering plant

Pityrodia pungens is a flowering plant in the mint family Lamiaceae and is endemic to the northern part of the Northern Territory. It is an erect, spreading shrub with narrow, prickly leaves and off-white, bell-like flowers with dark purple streaks.

== Description ==
Pityrodia pungens is a straggling shrub which grows to a height of 40–75 cm (20–30 in) and has branches sometimes covered with star-like hairs. The leaves are linear to narrow lance-shaped, usually 10–40 mm (0.39–1.6 in) long, 2–4 mm (0.08–0.2 in) wide with a sharp point on the end. The flowers are arranged singly in upper leaf axils and are shorter than the leaves. There are leaf-like bracts and lance-shaped bracteoles 4–9 mm (0.16–0.35 in) long at the base of the flowers. The sepals are joined for less than half their length to form a bell-shaped tube with five lance-shaped, hairy lobes 4–6.5 mm (0.16–0.26 in) long. The five petals are off-white, 10–13 mm (0.4–0.5 in) long and joined to form a bell-like tube with five lobes on the end. The two upper lobes have dark purple streaks and are 2–3 mm (0.079–0.12 in) long and smaller than the lower lobes. The upper lobes are shorter than or about equal to the length of the sepals. The lower middle lobe is larger than the others. The petals are glabrous except for soft hairs on the outside of the petal lobes and a dense hairy ring below the stamens. The four stamens extend slightly beyond the end of the tube, the lower pair slightly longer than the other one. Flowering occurs mainly from January to June and is followed by an oval-shaped, hairy fruit about 3 mm (0.12 in) long and 2 mm (0.08 in) wide.

== Taxonomy and naming ==
Pityrodia pungens was first formally described in 1979 by Ahmad Abid Munir from a specimen collected in the Nitmiluk National Park. The description was published in Journal of the Adelaide Botanic Gardens. The specific epithet (pungens) is a Latin word meaning "sharp", "acrid", "biting" or "piercing".

== Distribution ==
This pityrodia occurs in the northern part of the Northern Territory.

== Conservation ==
Pityrodia pungens is classified as "least concern" under the Territory Parks and Wildlife Conservation Act 2000.
