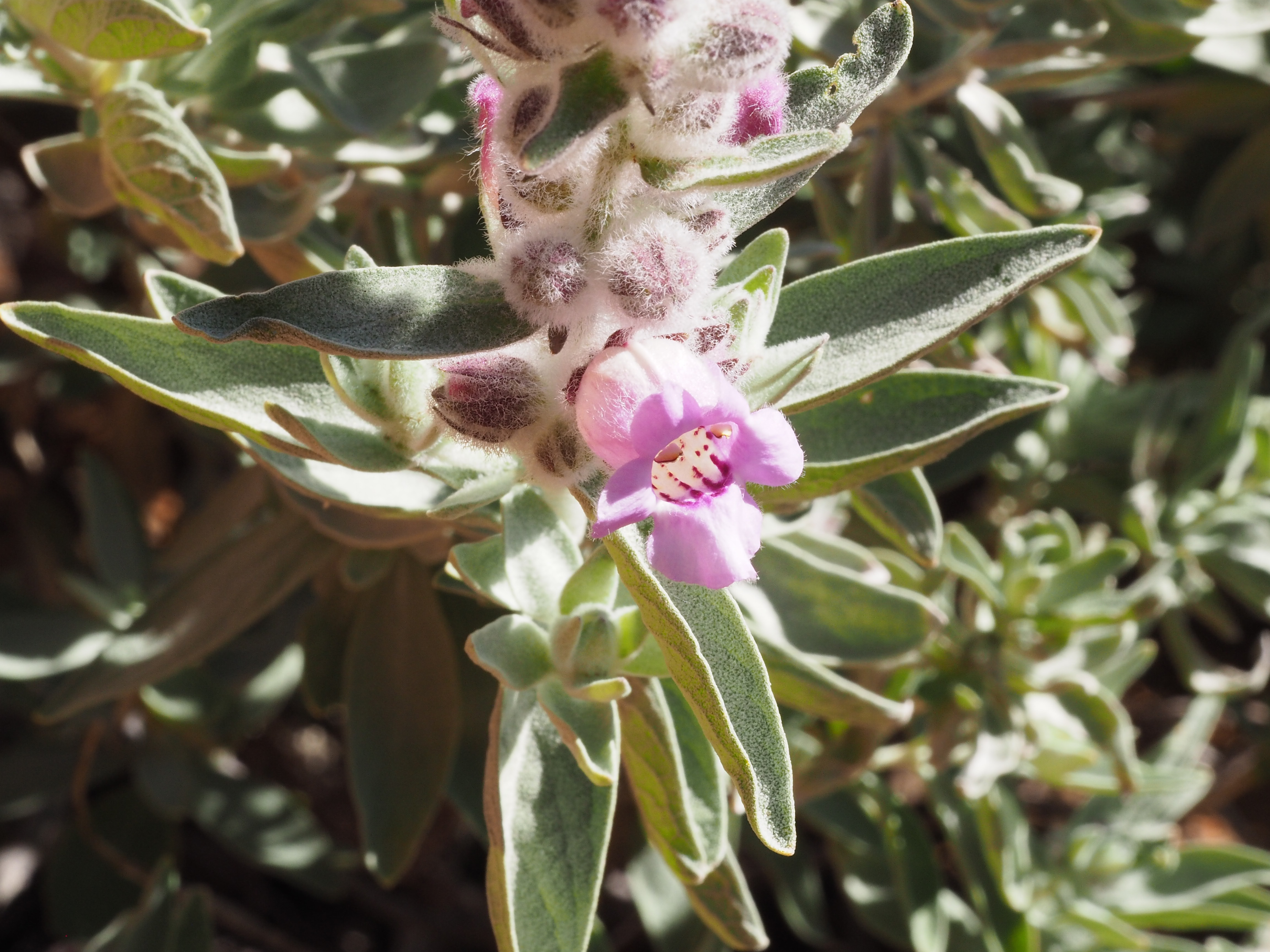
- Pityrodia augustensis

Scientific classification
- Kingdom: Plantae
- Clade: Embryophytes
- Clade: Tracheophytes
- Clade: Spermatophytes
- Clade: Angiosperms
- Clade: Eudicots
- Clade: Asterids
- Order: Lamiales
- Family: Lamiaceae
- Subfamily: Prostantheroideae
- Genus: Pityrodia; R.Br.

Species
- See text

Synonyms
- Denisonia F.Muell.; Dennisonia F.Muell.; Depremesnilia F.Muell.

= Pityrodia =

Genus of flowering plants

Pityrodia is a genus of flowering plants in the mint family, Lamiaceae and is endemic to Australia, most species occurring in Western Australia, a few in the Northern Territory and one in Queensland. Plants in this genus are shrubs with five petals joined to form a tube-shaped flower with four stamens of unequal lengths.

== Description ==
Plants in the genus Pityrodia are evergreen shrubs with erect, usually cylindrical branches. The leaves are simple, net-veined and their bases partly wrap around the stem (decurrent). The flowers may occur singly or in groups and exhibit left-right symmetry. There are 5 sepals which are joined at their bases and 5 petals joined to form a tube. The tube may have 5, unequally sized lobes at the tip or two "lips" - the upper lip having two lobes and the lower one three. There are four stamens with one pair longer than the other. The fruit is a drupe containing up to four seeds.

== Taxonomy and naming ==
The genus was first described by Robert Brown in 1810. Brown published his description in Prodromus Florae Novae Hollandiae and designated Pityrodia salvifolia as the type species. The name Pityrodia is an Ancient Greek word meaning "scale-like".

Pityrodia was originally included in the Verbenaceae. In a review of the genus in 1979, Ahmad Abid Munir included Pityrodia and nine other genera in a family Chloanthaceae, all endemic to Australia and sometimes referred to as "Australian Verbenaceae". The name Chloanthaceae has not been widely adopted and Pityrodia is now included in the Lamiaceae.

== Distribution ==
In his 1979 paper, Munir described 27 species from Western Australia, 16 from the Northern Territory and one from Queensland, but in 2011, Barry Conn, Murray Henwood and Nicola Streiber transferred some species to Dasymalla, Hemiphora and Quoya and raised a new genus Muniria to which four species of the former Pityrodia were transferred. A new species from Western Australia, (Pityrodia iphthima) has since been described.

The following is a list of Pityrodia species accepted by the Australian Plant Census as at February 2023:

- Pityrodia augustensis Munir - Mt. Augustus foxglove (W.A.
- Pityrodia byrnesii Munir (N.T.)
- Pityrodia canaliculata A.S.George (W.A.)
- Pityrodia chrysocalyx (F.Muell.) C.A.Gardner (W.A.)
- Pityrodia gilruthiana Munir (N.T.)
- Pityrodia hemigenioides (F.Muell.) Benth. (W.A.)
- Pityrodia iphthima K.A.Sheph. (W.A.)
- Pityrodia jamesii Specht (N.T.)
- Pityrodia lanuginosa Munir (N.T.)
- Pityrodia lepidota (F.Muell.) E.Pritz. (W.A.)
- Pityrodia loricata (F.Muell.) E.Pritz. (W.A., N.T., S.A.)
- Pityrodia obliqua W.Fitzg. (W.A.)
- Pityrodia puberula Munir (N.T.)
- Pityrodia pungens Munir (N.T.)
- Pityrodia salvifolia R.Br. (Qld.)
- Pityrodia scabra A.S.George (W.A.)
- Pityrodia serrata Munir (N.T.)
- Pityrodia spenceri Munir (N.T.)
- Pityrodia ternifolia (F.Muell.) Munir (W.A., N.T.)
- Pityrodia viscida W.Fitzg. (W.A.)
