= Georg August Pritzel =

German botanical librarian (1815–1874)

Georg August Pritzel (2 September 1815, Carolath – 14 June 1874) was a German librarian and botanical writer.

He studied in Breslau, graduating with a dissertation titled Anemonarum revisio. In 1851 he began work as a Hülfsarbeiter at the royal library in Berlin, a post which eventually led to curator duties. From 1855 onwards, he served as archivist at the Prussian Academy of Sciences.

== Principal works ==
- Pritzel, G. A. (1872). Thesaurus literaturae botanicae omnium gentium, inde a rerum botanicarum initiis ad nostra usque tempora, quindecim millia operum recensens. Lipsiae: F. A. Brockhaus.; first published in 1851, it contains literature from ancient times to his present. Research involved examination of 40,000 works in libraries at Vienna, Geneva, London, Paris and various German locations.
- Iconum Botanicarum index locupletissimus (1855-1866).
- Die deutschen Volksnamen der Pflanzen (1884); (The German common names of plants), 24,000 plant names given. Completed by botanist Karl Friedrich Wilhelm Jessen (1821–1889), after Pritzel's death in 1874.

The botanical genus Pritzelago from the family Brassicaceae was named after him by Otto Kuntze (1843-1907).
