= Atlas of Living Australia =

Online database of Australian plants, animals and fungi

- Available in: English
- Website: www.ala.org.au
- Commercial: No
- Launched: October 2010
- Current status: Active

The Atlas of Living Australia (ALA) is an online repository of information about Australian plants, animals, and fungi. Development started in 2006. The Commonwealth Scientific and Industrial Research Organisation (CSIRO) is an organisation significantly involved in the development of the ALA. The Atlas of Living Australia is the Australian node of the Global Biodiversity Information Facility. The ALA is being used to help assess suitability of revegetation projects by determining species vulnerability to climatic and atmospheric change.

The Atlas of Living Australia is hosted by CSIRO and supported by the National Collaborative Research Infrastructure Strategy.

== See also ==
- Australasian Virtual Herbarium
- Australian Plant Name Index
- Encyclopedia of Life
- GBIF
- DigiVol
