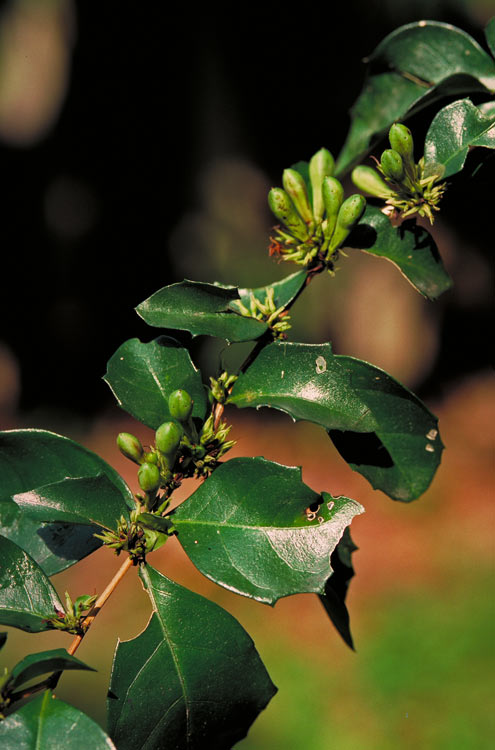
- Flower buds

Conservation status
- Least Concern (NCA)

Scientific classification
- Kingdom: Plantae
- Clade: Tracheophytes
- Clade: Angiosperms
- Clade: Eudicots
- Clade: Asterids
- Order: Lamiales
- Family: Acanthaceae
- Genus: Graptophyllum
- Species: G. spinigerum

Binomial name
- Graptophyllum spinigerum F.Muell.

= Graptophyllum spinigerum =

Samford holly

Species of flowering plant

Graptophyllum spinigerum, commonly known as Samford holly, is a species of plant in the family Acanthaceae. It is native to New Guinea and northern Australia, and was first described in 1879.

== Description ==
Graptophyllum spinigerum is a shrub up to about 2 m (6 ft 7 in) tall. The leaves are arranged in opposite and decussate pairs, with one of each pair much reduced, and they may grow to about 8 cm (3.1 in) long and 4 cm (1.6 in) wide. They are glossy dark green above and the leaf margins have about four teeth or lobes on either side. They are sessile, i.e. the leaf stems are either extremely short or absent altogether. Spines may be present on the twigs.

The inflorescence is either an umbel, cluster, or a solitary flower, emerging from the leaf axils. The flowers have five cream or white, red-spotted petals about 9 mm (0.35 in) long. The fruit is a brown capsule about 15–20 mm (0.59–0.79 in) long.

== Taxonomy ==
It was first described in 1878 by the German-Australian botanist Ferdinand von Mueller, and published in his massive work Fragmenta phytographiæ Australiæ. The description was based on material collected near the Endeavour River.

== Distribution and habitat ==
The native range of this species is from New Guinea to the Northern Territory and Queensland in Australia. It inhabits rainforest and monsoon forest, particularly in exposed situations on rocky substrates. The altitudinal range in Australia is from sea level to about 500 m (1,600 ft).

== Conservation ==
This species is listed as least concern under the Queensland Government's Nature Conservation Act. As of 10 September 2025, it has not been assessed by the International Union for Conservation of Nature (IUCN).

== Gallery ==
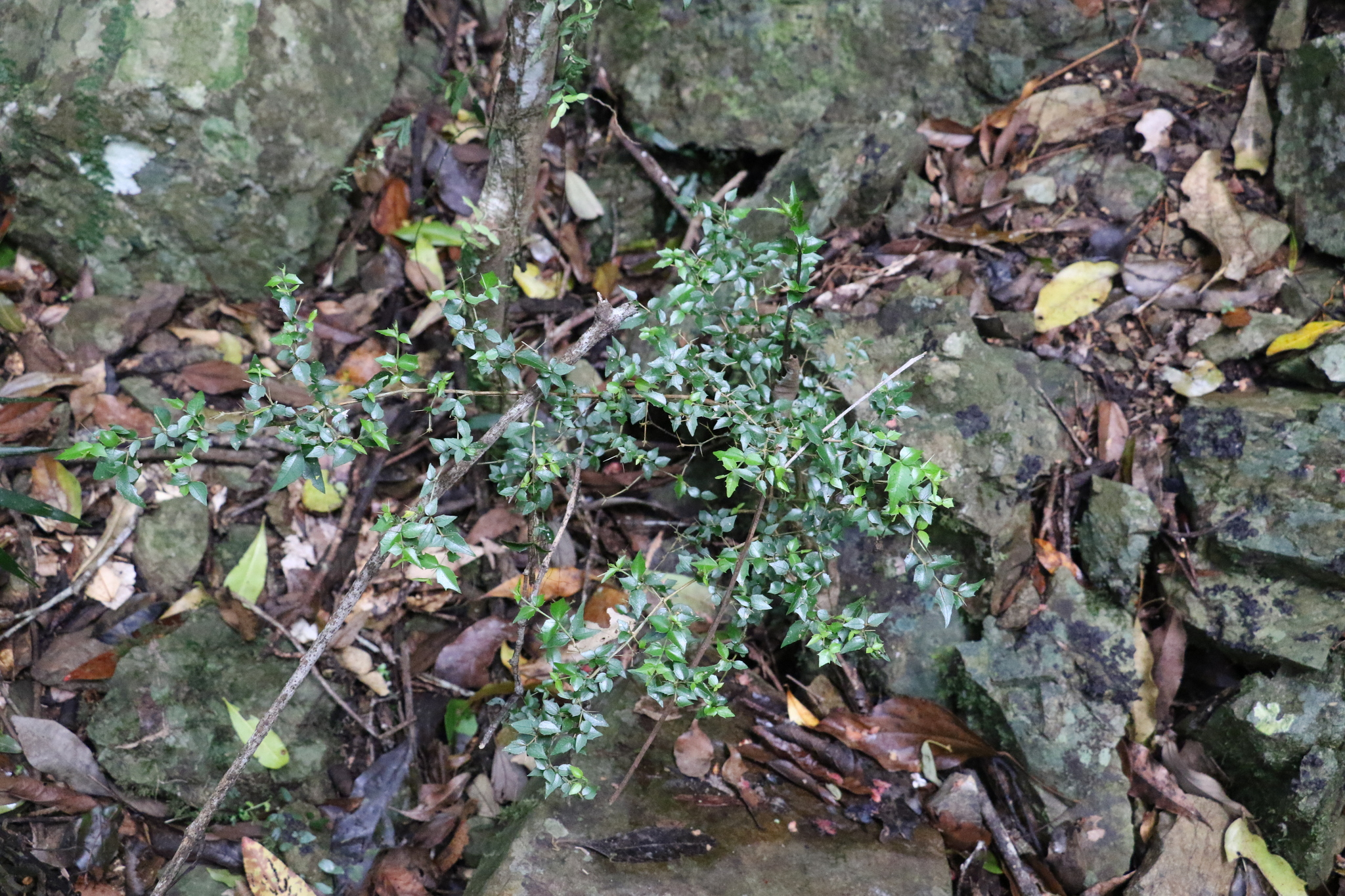
Habit

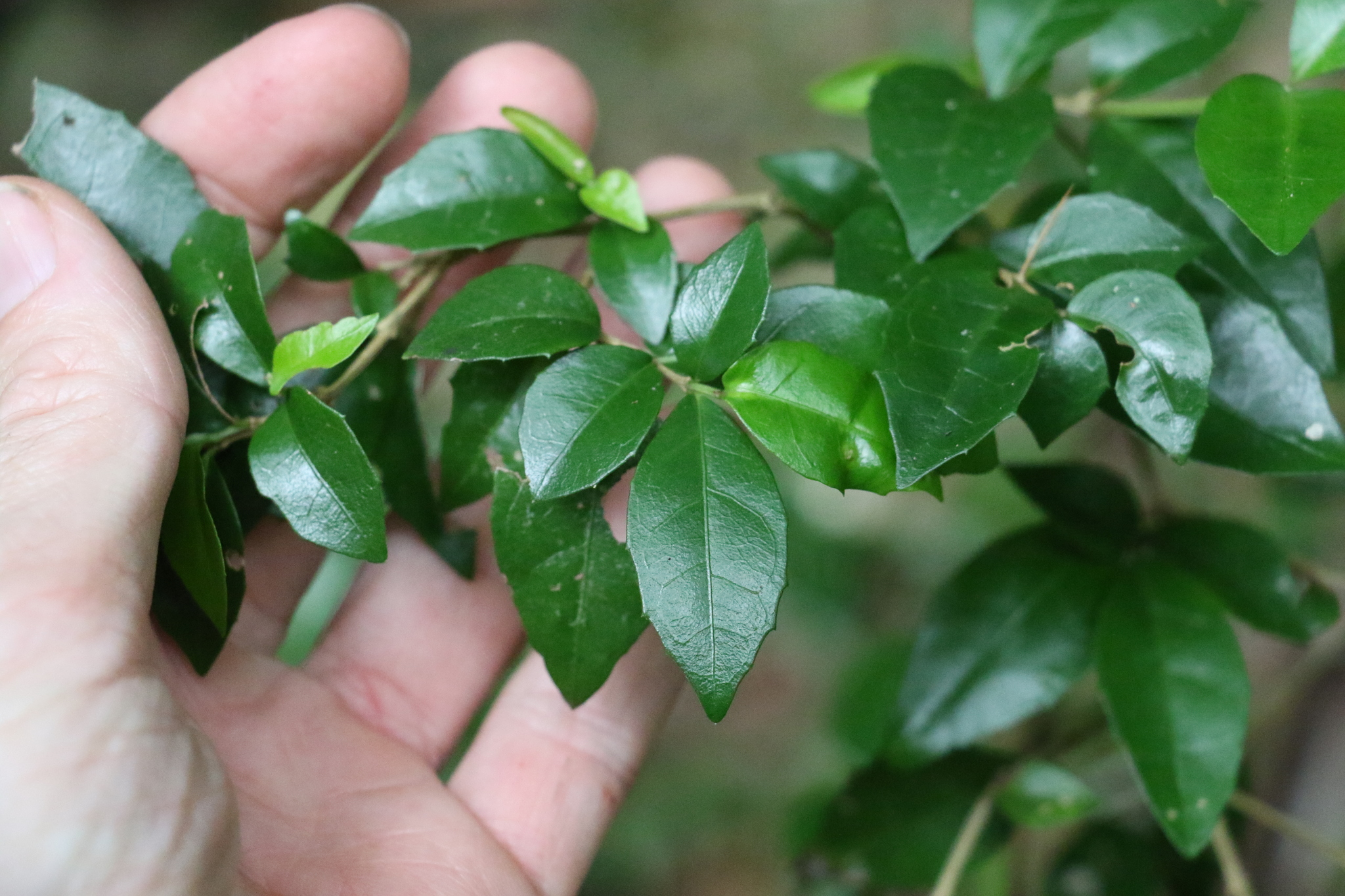
Foliage

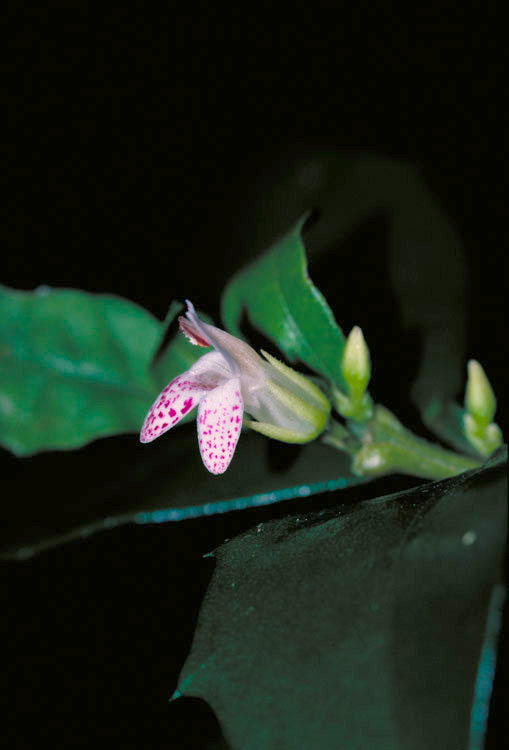
Flower

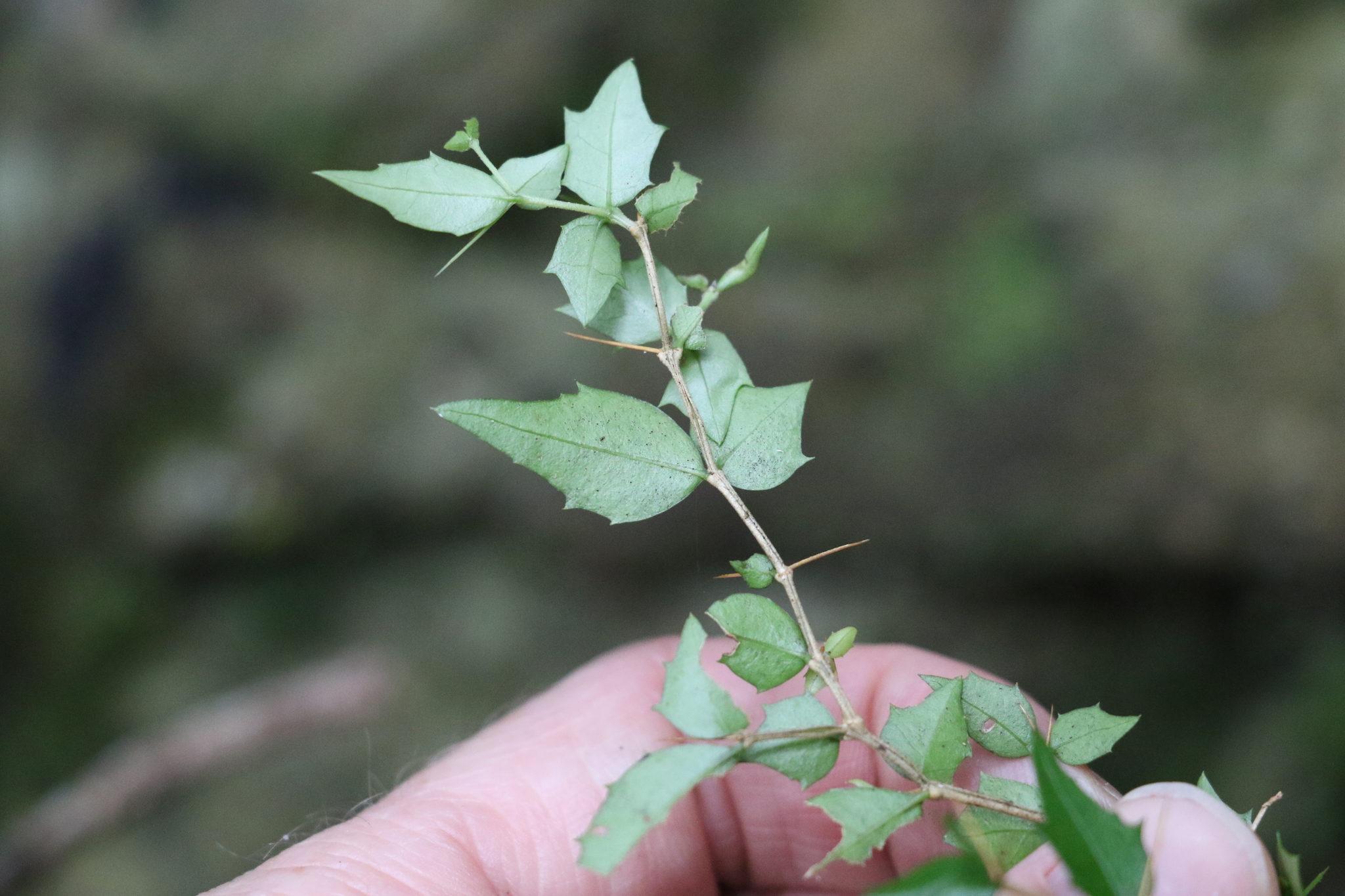
Spines

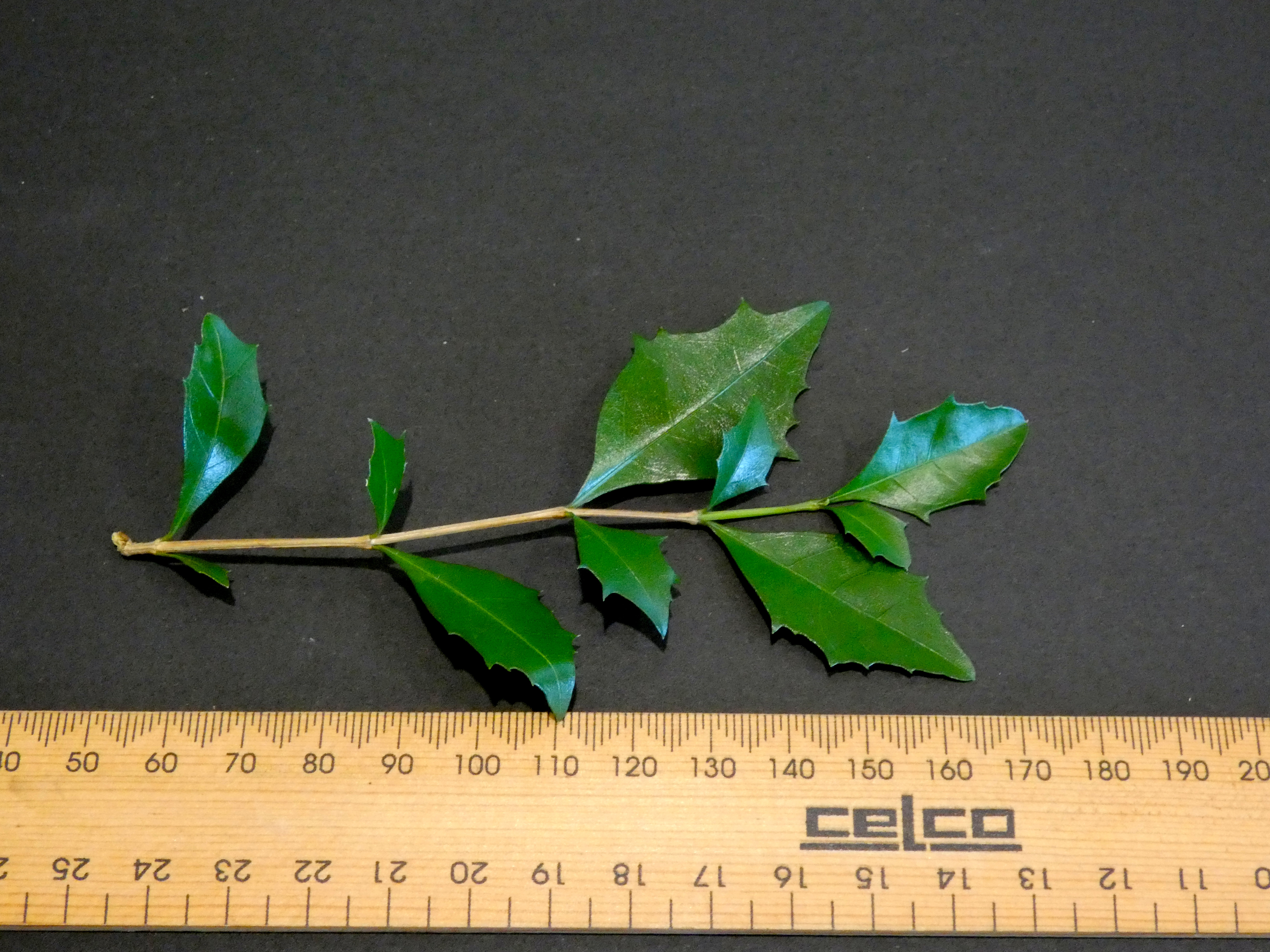
One of each pair of leaves is reduced
