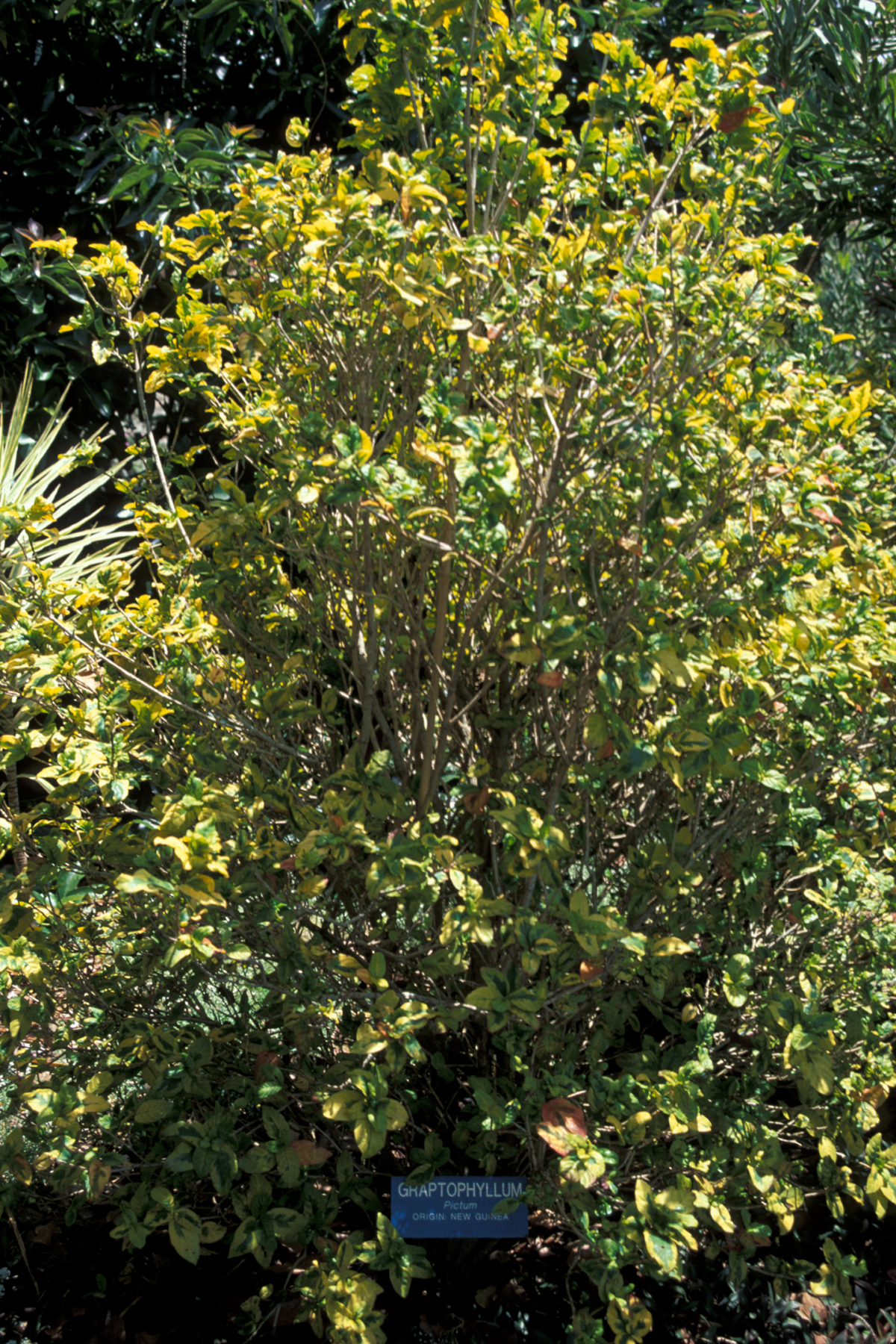
- Graptophyllum pictum

Scientific classification
- Kingdom: Plantae
- Clade: Tracheophytes
- Clade: Angiosperms
- Clade: Eudicots
- Clade: Asterids
- Order: Lamiales
- Family: Acanthaceae
- Subfamily: Acanthoideae
- Tribe: Justicieae
- Genus: Graptophyllum; Nees

Species
- see text

Synonyms
- Earlia F.Muell.; Marama Raf.

= Graptophyllum =

Species of flowering plant

Graptophyllum is a genus of plants in the family Acanthaceae. It includes 15 species with a disjunct distribution, with one species (Graptophyllum glandulosum) native to tropical Africa, and the others to New Guinea, Queensland, and the southwest Pacific Islands.

== Species ==
As of September 2025, 15 species are accepted:

- Graptophyllum balansae Heine – New Caledonia
- Graptophyllum excelsum (F.Muell.) Druce – Queensland
- Graptophyllum gilliganii (F.M.Bailey) S.Moore – New Guinea
- Graptophyllum glandulosum Turrill – Nigeria, Cameroon, and Central African Republic
- Graptophyllum ilicifolium (F.Muell.) Benth. – northeastern Queensland
- Graptophyllum insularum (A.Gray) A.C.Sm. – Fiji and Tonga
- Graptophyllum macrostemon Heine – northwestern New Caledonia
- Graptophyllum ophioliticum Heine – northwestern New Caledonia
- Graptophyllum pictum (L.) Griff. – New Guinea
- Graptophyllum pubiflorum S.Moore – New Guinea
- Graptophyllum repandum (A.Gray) A.C.Sm. – Fiji
- Graptophyllum reticulatum A.R.Bean & Sharpe – Queensland
- Graptophyllum sessilifolium A.C.Sm. – Fiji
- Graptophyllum spinigerum F.Muell. – Queensland
- Graptophyllum thorogoodii C.T.White – Queensland
