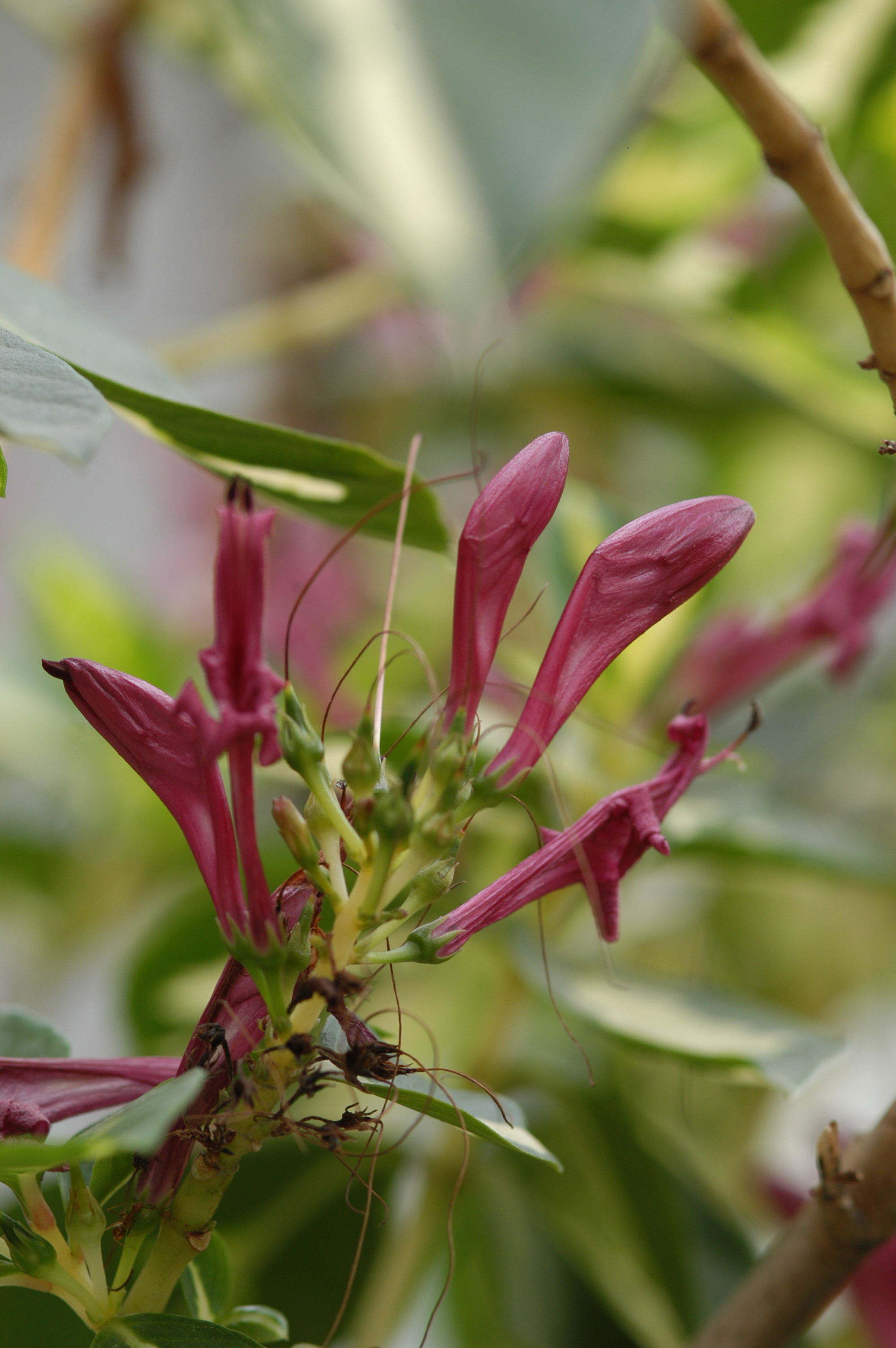

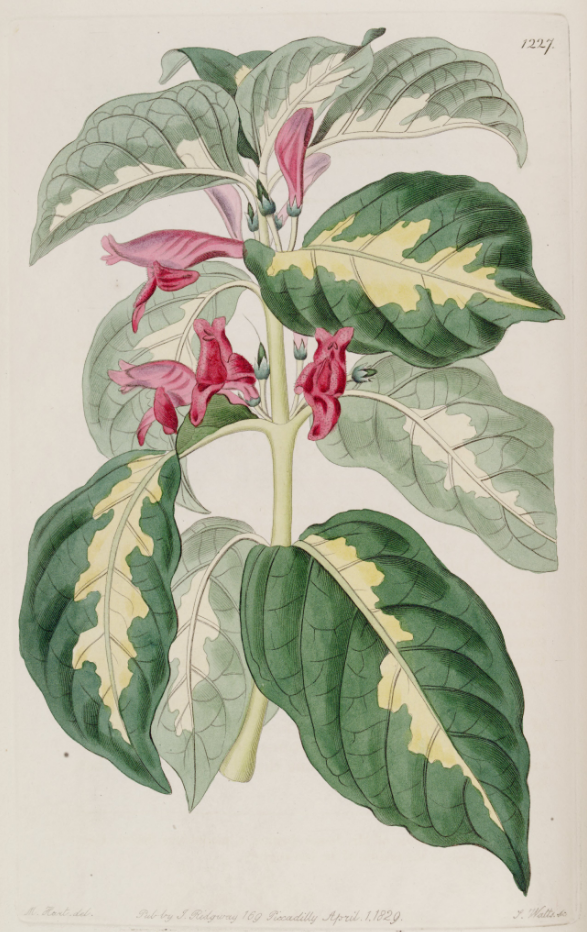
- Graptophyllum pictum (artist:M. Hart)

Scientific classification
- Kingdom: Plantae
- Clade: Tracheophytes
- Clade: Angiosperms
- Clade: Eudicots
- Clade: Asterids
- Order: Lamiales
- Family: Acanthaceae
- Genus: Graptophyllum
- Species: G. pictum

Binomial name
- Graptophyllum pictum (L.) Griff.

Synonyms
- Justicia picta L.

= Graptophyllum pictum =

Species of flowering plant

Graptophyllum pictum, the caricature-plant, is a shrub in the family Acanthaceae. It is native to New Guinea, also a well-known garden shrub. There are two varieties: the variegated color one is known as 'white adulsa', and is used combined with coconut water to reduce swelling. The dark-leaved variety is known with trade name 'black adulsa' in India.

== Leaf morphology ==
The shape of the leaf is aristate. The margin of the leaf is undulate. The venation of the leaf is reticulate in the variegated form.

Graptophyllum pictum is similar in appearance to Pseuderanthemum carruthersii.

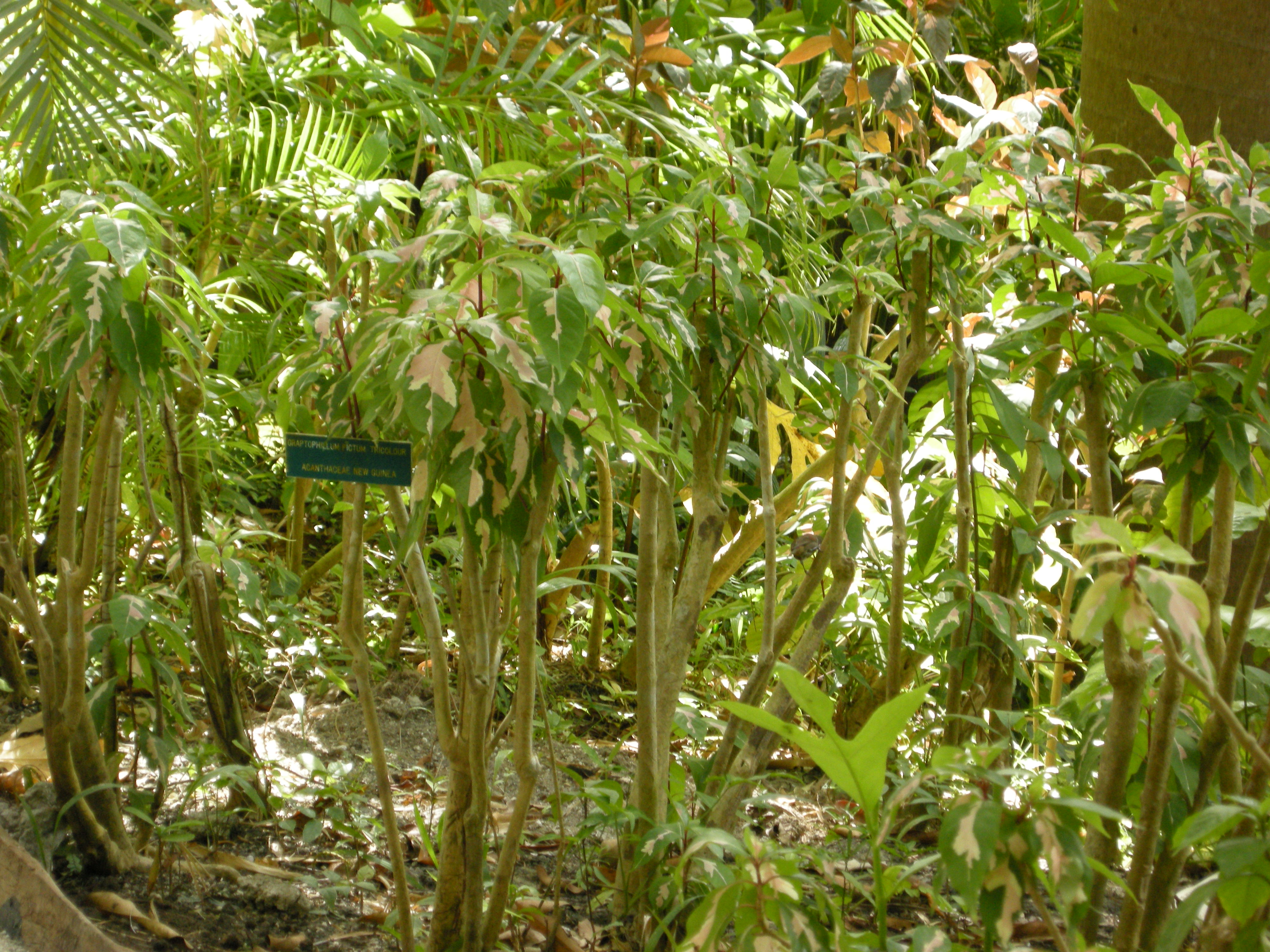
A group of plants of this species in the Andromeda Botanic Gardens, Barbados
