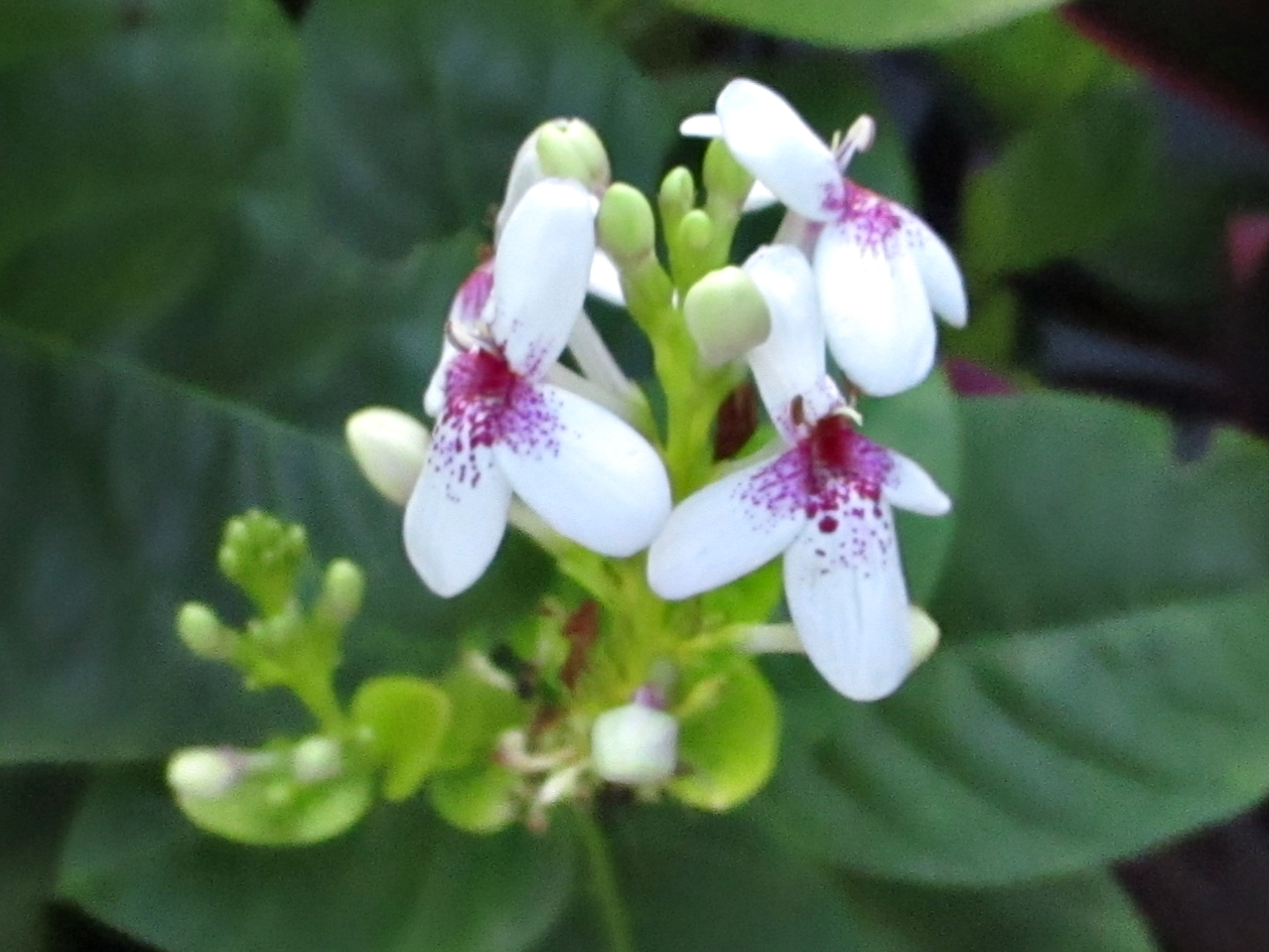

Scientific classification
- Kingdom: Plantae
- Clade: Tracheophytes
- Clade: Angiosperms
- Clade: Eudicots
- Clade: Asterids
- Order: Lamiales
- Family: Acanthaceae
- Genus: Pseuderanthemum
- Species: P. carruthersii

Binomial name
- Pseuderanthemum carruthersii (Seem.) Guillaumin

Synonyms
- Eranthemum atropurpureum W.Bull; Eranthemum aureoreticulatum B.S.Williams; Eranthemum aureoreticulatum Hook.f.; Eranthemum carruthersii Seem.; Eranthemum nigrescens W.Bull; Eranthemum nigrum Linden; Eranthemum reticulatum W.Bull; Eranthemum reticulatum A.de Vos [Illegitimate]; Eranthemum schomburgkii auct.; Eranthemum tricolor W.Bull; Pseuderanthemum atropurpureum (W.Bull) Radlk.; Pseuderanthemum carruthersii var. atropurpureum (W.Bull) Fosberg; Pseuderanthemum reticulatum Radlk.; Siphoneranthemum atropurpureum (W.Bull) Kuntze; Siphoneranthemum reticulatum Kuntze; Siphoneranthemum tricolor Kuntze

= Pseuderanthemum carruthersii =

Species of flowering plant

Pseuderanthemum carruthersii, the Carruthers' falseface, is a species of plant in the family Acanthaceae. It is native from the Solomon Islands to Vanuatu.

Pseuderanthemum carruthersii is popularly grown as an ornamental outside of its native range. It has been introduced in many tropical countries. Prior to contact with Europeans, Melanesian islanders brought P. carruthersii to different Pacific Islands. Later it also began to be grown in European nurseries.

Pseuderanthemum carruthersii is similar in appearance to Graptophyllum pictum.

== Chemical analysis ==
The Carruthers' falseface is highly used in researches for extracting many chemical compounds. The following chemicals can be found in the plant.

=== Lignans ===
- Eudesmin
- Magnolin
- Syringaresinol
- Episyringaresinol
- 1-hydroxysyringaresinol
- Pseuderesinol
- Pseuderanoside

=== Triterpenes ===
- Squalene
- Oleanolic acid
- Lupeol
- Betulin
- Betulinic acid
- Pseuderanic acid
