= Graptophyllum repandum =

Conservation status
- Near Threatened (IUCN 2.3)

Scientific classification
- Kingdom: Plantae
- Clade: Tracheophytes
- Clade: Angiosperms
- Clade: Eudicots
- Clade: Asterids
- Order: Lamiales
- Family: Acanthaceae
- Genus: Graptophyllum
- Species: G. repandum

Binomial name
- Graptophyllum repandum (A.Gray) Sm.A.C.

Species of flowering plant

Graptophyllum repandum is a species of plant in the family Acanthaceae. It is endemic to Fiji.

== See also ==
- IUCN Red List

== Sources ==
- World Conservation Monitoring Centre 1998
