= Mount Blackwood =

Mountain in Queensland, Australia

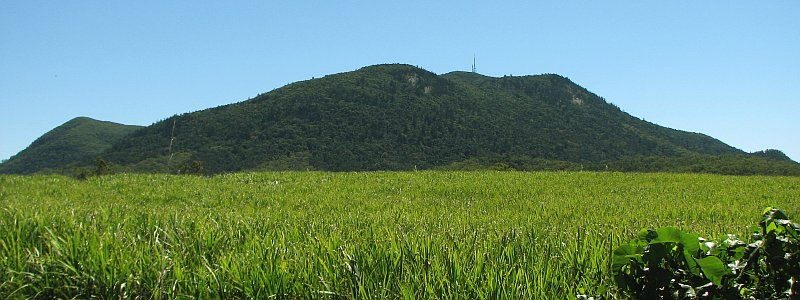
- Mount Blackwood rising above the Mackay district cane fields.

Highest point
- Elevation: 639 m (2,096 ft)
- Listing: List of mountains in Australia
- Coordinates: 21°02′S 148°56′E

Geography
- Location within Queensland
- Location: Queensland, Australia

Climbing
- Easiest route: Paved road (locked)

Mount Blackwood is a mountain located within the boundaries of the Mackay Regional Council in Central Queensland, Australia and has an elevation of 639m. It is covered in dense tropical rainforest and is home to the Mount Blackwood Holly (Graptophyllum ilicifolium), a species of shrub endemic to the area. It also has the Pioneer Valley close to the region. Also nearby mountains are Mt Jukes, Mt Ossa and Mt Brampton.

Mount Blackwood is used for commercial television transmission, such as ABC Queensland, and other communications in the Mackay district. It is also used for transmission of VHF Automatic En Route Information Service (AERIS) broadcasts for civil aviation.
