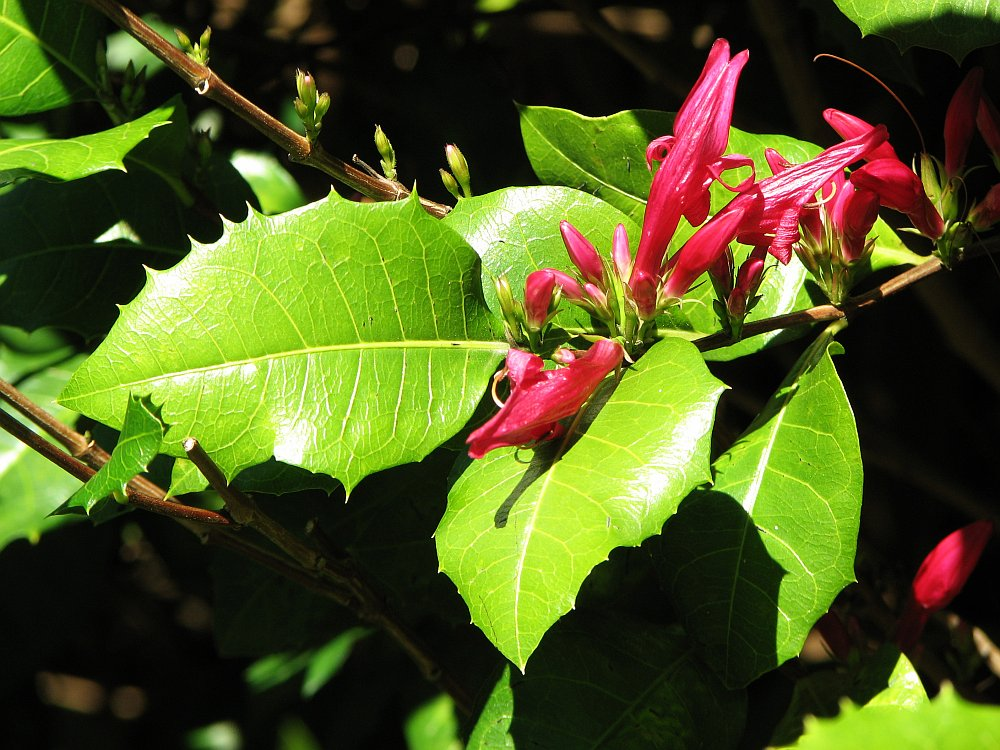

Conservation status
- Vulnerable (NCA)

Scientific classification
- Kingdom: Plantae
- Clade: Embryophytes
- Clade: Tracheophytes
- Clade: Spermatophytes
- Clade: Angiosperms
- Clade: Eudicots
- Clade: Asterids
- Order: Lamiales
- Family: Acanthaceae
- Genus: Graptophyllum
- Species: G. ilicifolium

Binomial name
- Graptophyllum ilicifolium (F.Muell.) Benth.

Synonyms
- Graptophyllum earlii var. ilicifolium F.Muell.

= Graptophyllum ilicifolium =

Species of flowering plant

Graptophyllum ilicifolium, commonly known as the Mount Blackwood holly, is a species of plant in the family Acanthaceae. It is native to central Queensland, Australia, and has a conservation status of vulnerable.

== Description ==
Mount Blackwood holly is a large rainforest shrub which grows in granitic soils. It has shiny, dark green leaves which resemble those of the unrelated holly, and grows best in moist, semi-shaded, well-drained, well-mulched soils. The shrub grows to 5 metres in height and has leaves 7.5 to 10 centimetres long which are shiny, noticeably veined, dark green in colour and have a spinous margin. The flowers are red and in short clusters, each about 2 to 2.5 centimetres in length.

== History ==
The species was originally collected from Mount Blackwood, north of Mackay, in the 1800s and was part of a collection by Nernst which is now at the Melbourne Herbarium. In 1984, plants described in this collection were found in the Mount Blackwood and Mount Jukes areas. These were collected and identified to be Graptophyllum ilicifolium by the Queensland Herbarium.

After identification, the Mount Blackwood holly was propagated and trialled by Society for Growing Australian Plants Mackay Branch members. It was offered to the general public in 1991 at the Australian Plant Spectacular, then adopted as the floral emblem of the Mackay Branch of the Society for Growing Australian Plants in 1992 and the Mackay Regional Botanic Gardens in 2003.
