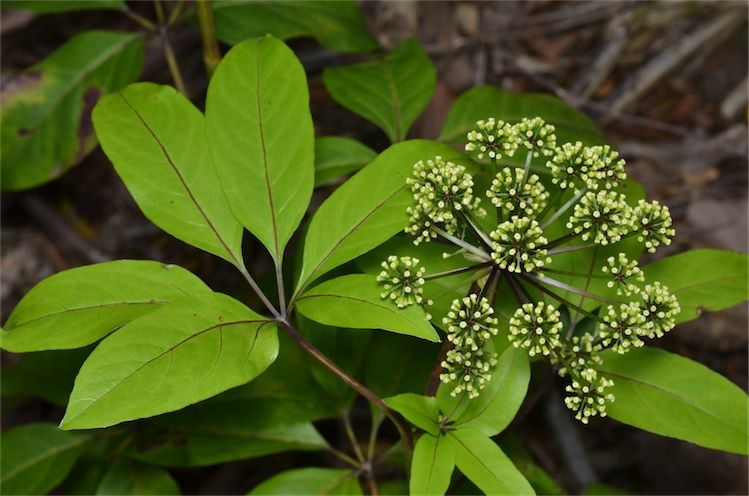
- Foliage and flowers

Conservation status
- Least Concern (NCA)

Scientific classification
- Kingdom: Plantae
- Clade: Embryophytes
- Clade: Tracheophytes
- Clade: Spermatophytes
- Clade: Angiosperms
- Clade: Eudicots
- Clade: Asterids
- Order: Apiales
- Family: Apiaceae
- Genus: Mackinlaya
- Species: M. macrosciadea

Binomial name
- Mackinlaya macrosciadea (F.Muell.) F.Muell.

Synonyms
- Panax macrosciadeus F.Muell. (1860)

= Mackinlaya macrosciadea =

Mackinlaya

Species of plant in the celery family

Mackinlaya macrosciadea, commonly known as mackinlaya or blue umbrella, is a plant in the carrot, fennel and parsley family Apiaceae, found in the Northern Territory and Queensland, Australia.

== Description ==
Mackinlaya macrosciadea is an evergreen shrub growing up to 3–5 m tall (10–16 ft), usually unbranched. The compound leaves are held on petioles up to 15 cm (6 in) long, with 3–7 leaflets arranged around a common attachment point (i.e. they are palmate). The leaflets are glabrous (without hairs), measure up to 18 cm (7 in) long and 6 cm (2.4 in) wide, and their margins may be smooth, toothed or lobed.

The inflorescence is terminal and takes the form of an umbel of umbels - that is, a number of stalks of equal length emanate from a single point on the plant, and these in turn branch into a number of flower stalks (pedicels), again of common length and attachment point, and each carrying a single flower. Individual flowers are about 2.5 mm (0.10 in) diameter and may be white, cream or green.

The fruit is a glaucous, blue-grey or purple, 2-lobed drupe about 15 mm (0.59 in) long and 18 mm (0.71 in) wide. They contain 1–2 cream to pale brown seeds.

=== Phenology ===
Flowering and fruiting both occur from May to November.

== Taxonomy ==
This species was first described as Panax macrosciadeus in 1860 by the Victorian colonial botanist Ferdinand von Mueller, and published in his multi-volume book Fragmenta phytographiæ Australiæ. The description was based on material collected by the Irish botanist and collector Eugene Fitzalan from the Cumberland Islands. Four years later, in 1864, Mueller revised his description and transferred the species to its current genus Mackinlaya.

=== Etymology ===
The genus Mackinlaya was erected by Mueller and named in honour of the Scottish-born Australian explorer John McKinlay (cited as "J. MacKinlay" by Mueller). The species epithet macrosciadea is derived from "macro" meaning large or great, combined with "sciadion" meaning parasol, and is a reference to the arrangement of the inflorescences.

=== Vernacular names ===
The common name preferred by Australian botanic authorities is Mackinlaya. It is also known as blue umbrella.

== Distribution and habitat ==
Mackinlaya is present both in and on the margins of various types of rainforest, where it is an understorey tree. It occurs in a number of disjunct ranges - one in the Northern Territory in the Arnhem Plateau and Pine Creek bioregions, and several populations on the east coast of Queensland, from Lockhart River to the Sunshine Coast. The altitudinal range in Queensland is from sea level to 1,100 m (3,600 ft).

== Ecology ==
The fruit are eaten by cassowaries (Casuarius casuarius) and tooth-billed bowerbirds (Scenopoeetes dentirostris).

== Conservation ==
This species is listed by the Queensland Government's Department of Environment, Science and Innovation as least concern. As of 28 March 2024, it has not been assessed by the International Union for Conservation of Nature (IUCN).

== Gallery ==
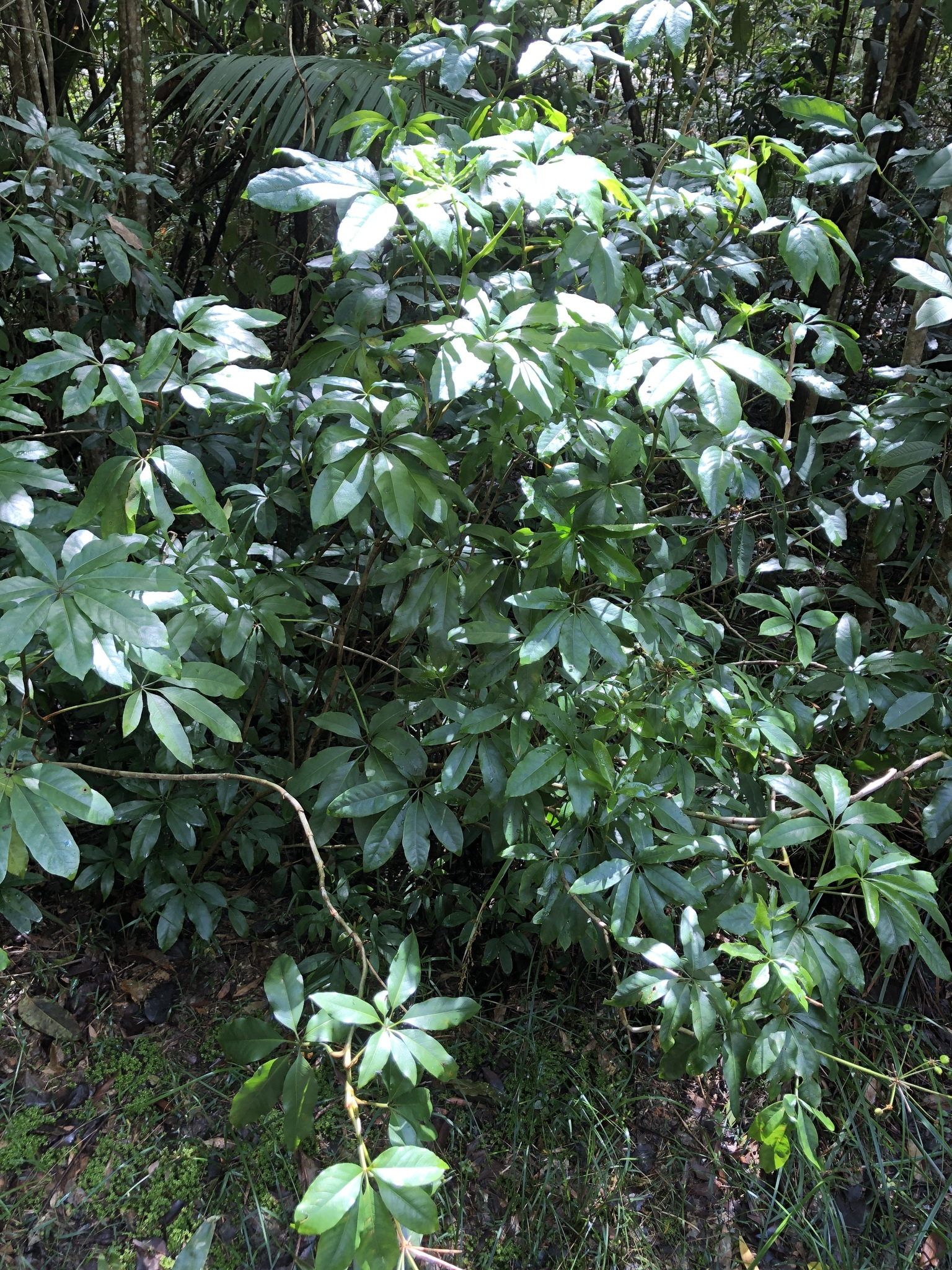
Habit

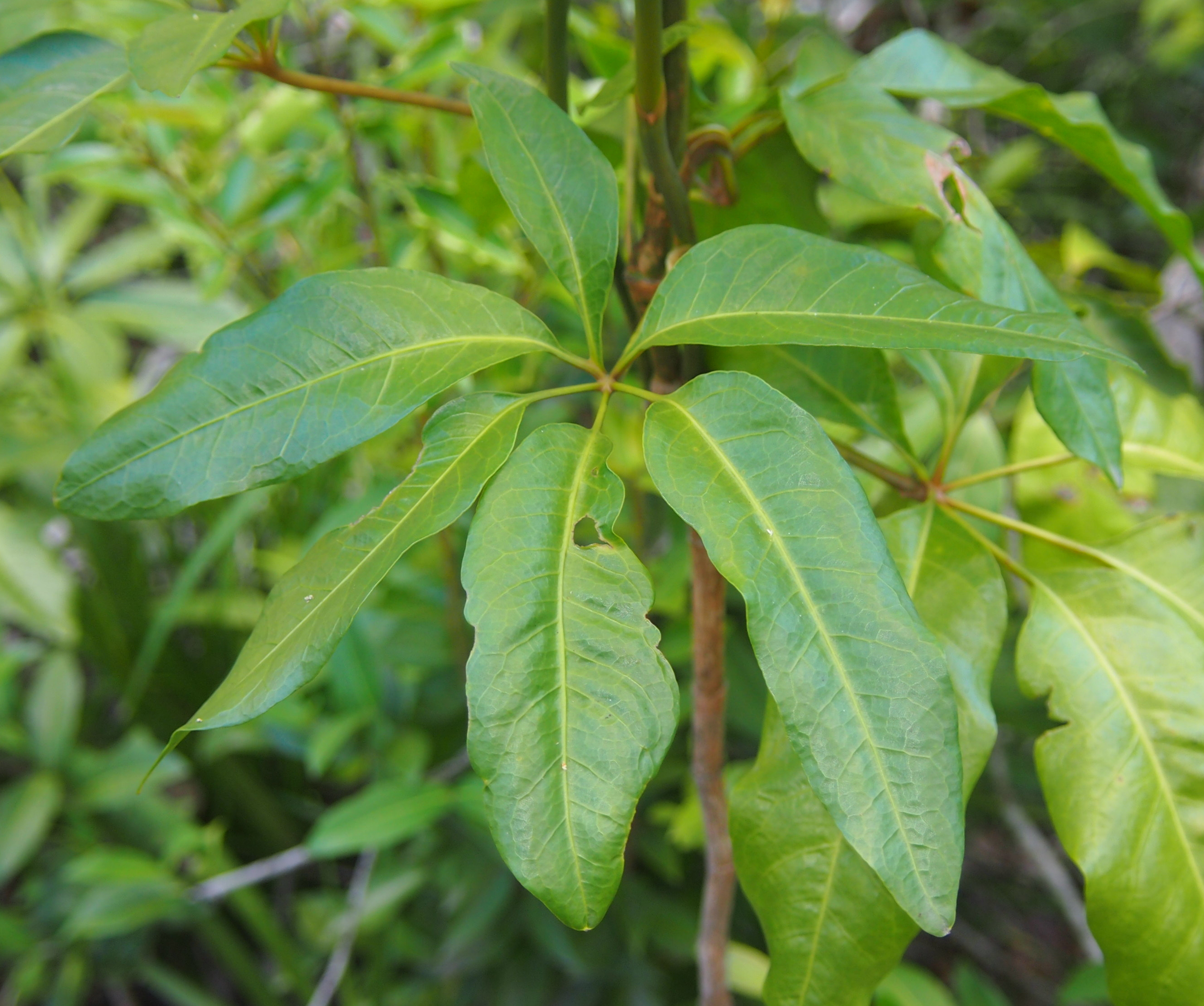
A compound leaf

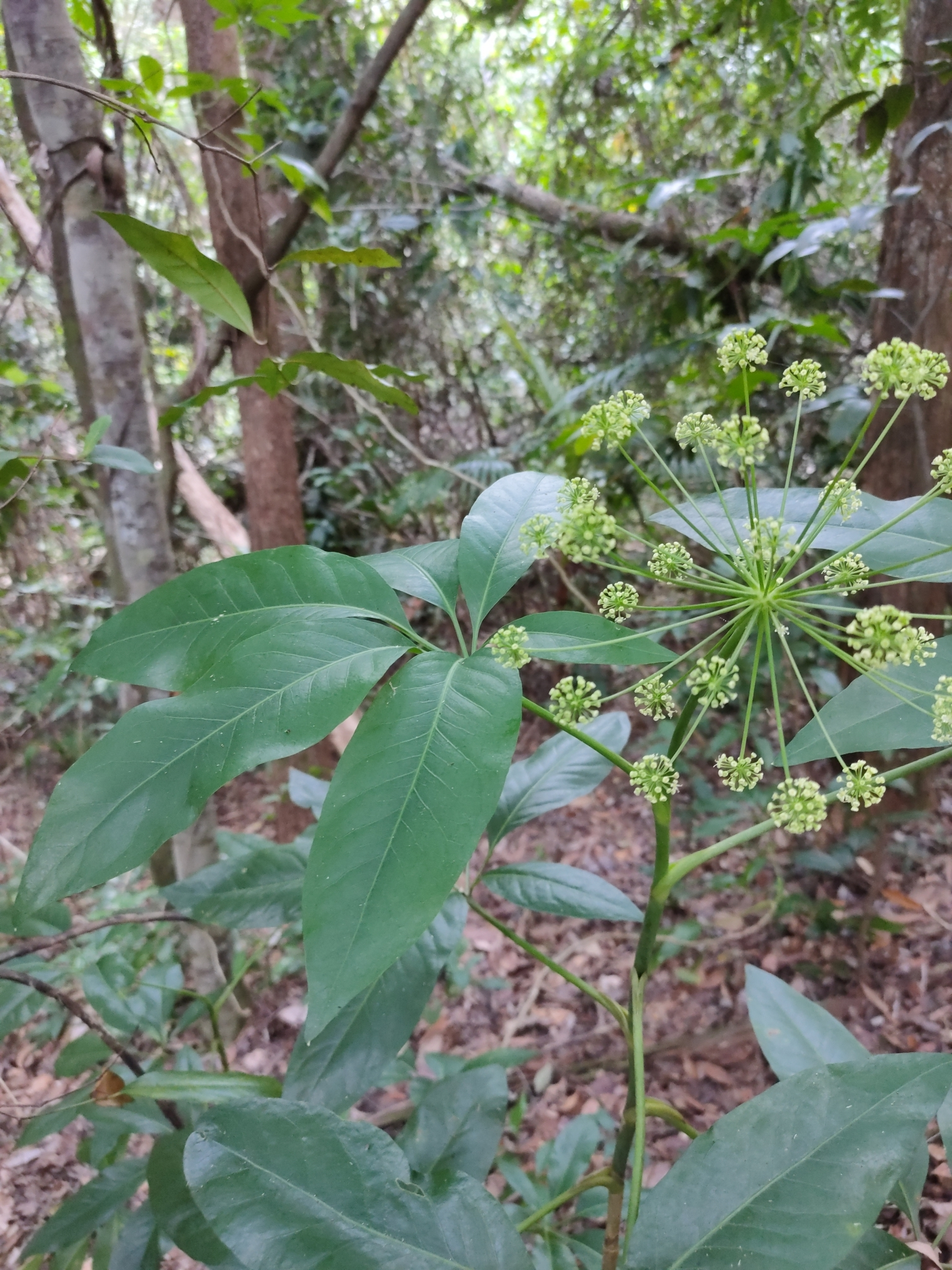
Foliage, flower buds

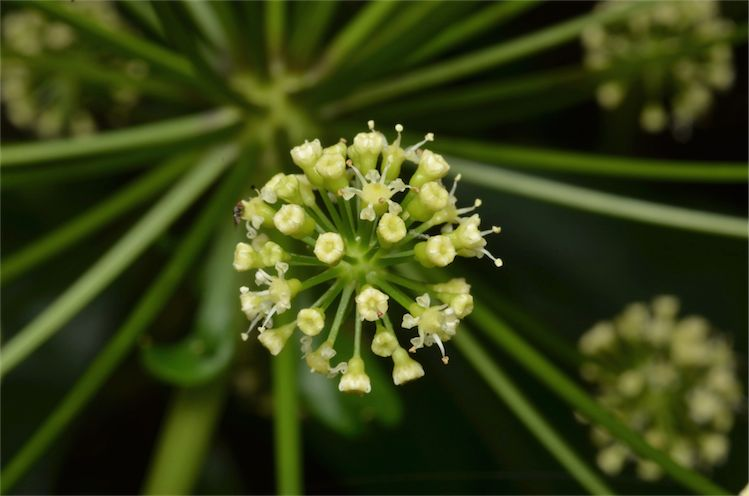
Flowers

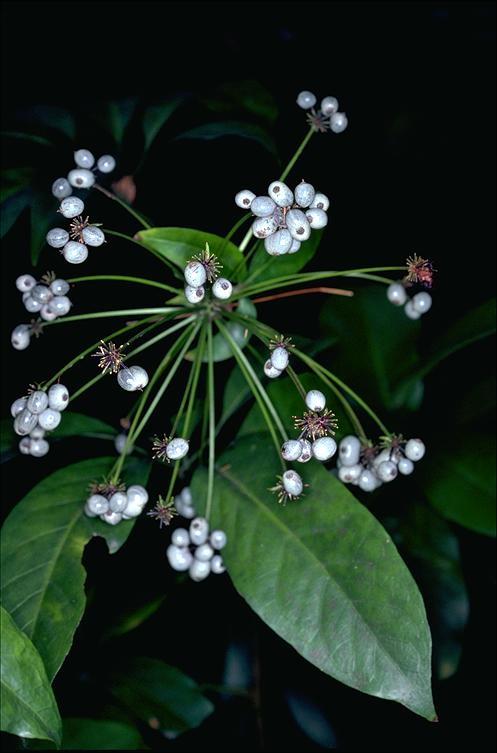
Mature fruit
