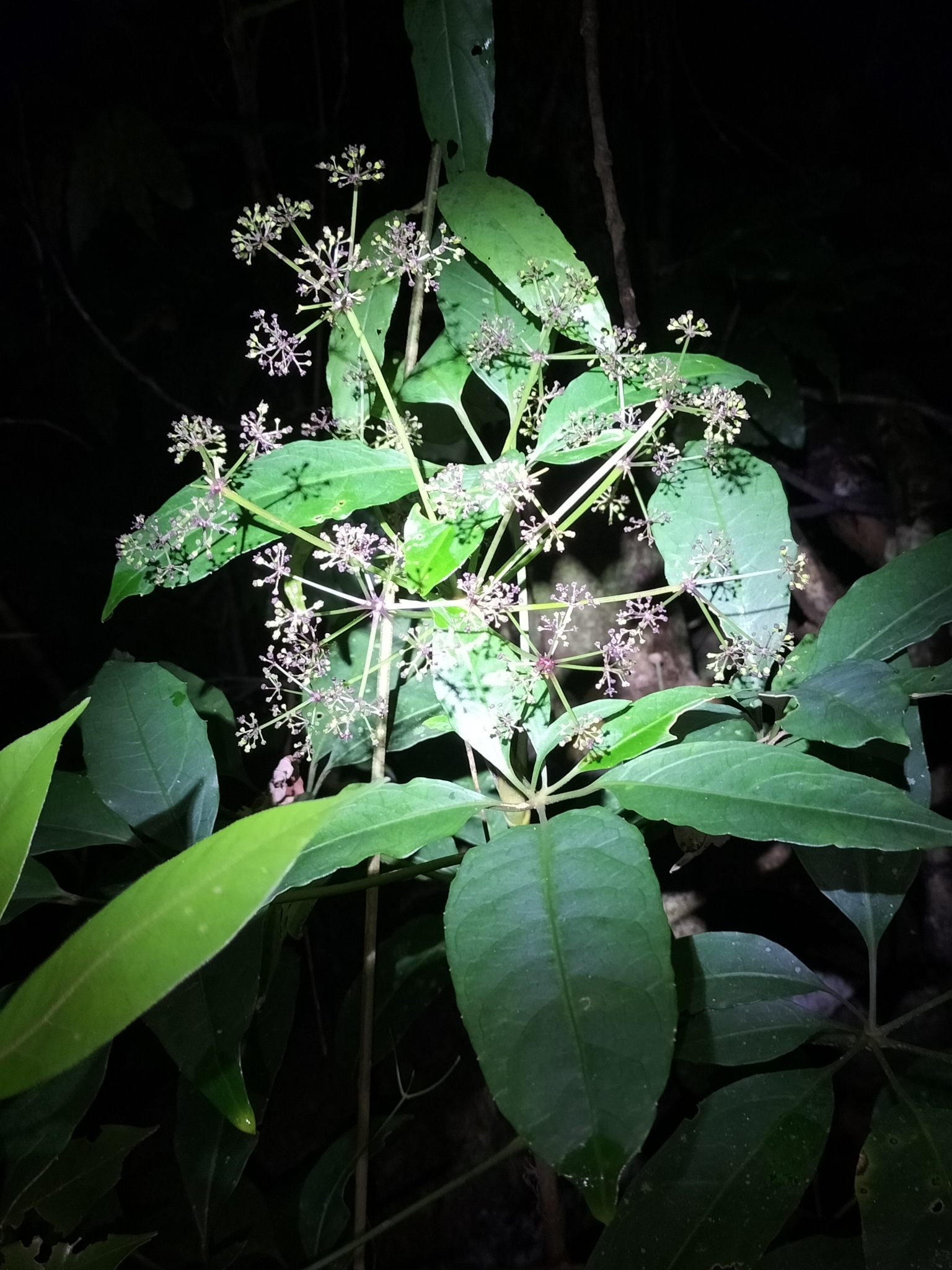
- At Yungaburra, Queensland

Conservation status
- Least Concern (NCA)

Scientific classification
- Kingdom: Plantae
- Clade: Tracheophytes
- Clade: Angiosperms
- Clade: Eudicots
- Clade: Asterids
- Order: Apiales
- Family: Apiaceae
- Genus: Mackinlaya
- Species: M. confusa

Binomial name
- Mackinlaya confusa Hemsl.
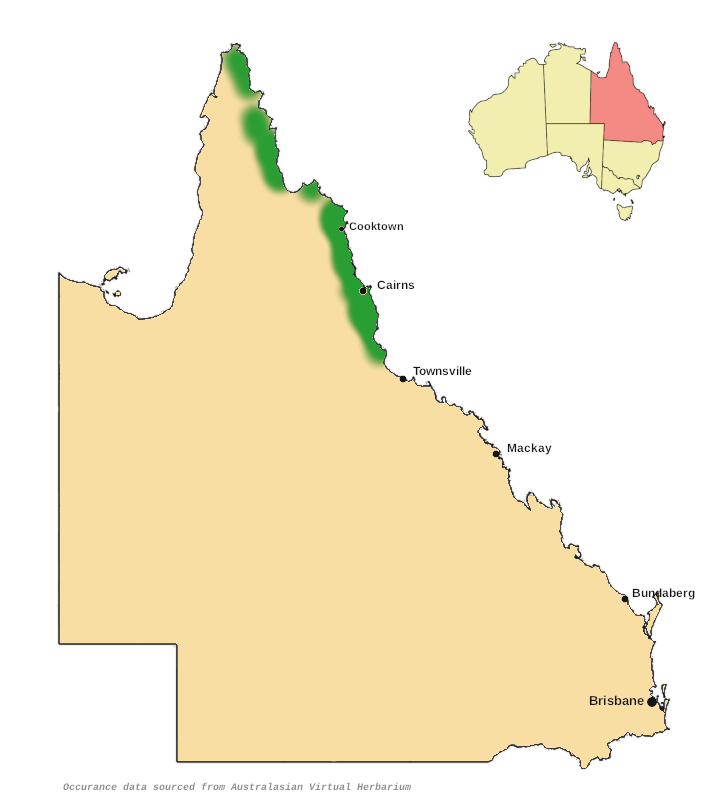

= Mackinlaya confusa =

Species of flowering plant

Mackinlaya confusa is a plant in the carrot, fennel and parsley family Apiaceae that is endemic to Queensland, Australia. It was first described in 1909.

== Description ==
Mackinlaya confusa is a shrub growing up to 6 m (20 ft) tall, usually unbranched. The compound leaves are held on petioles up to 25 cm (10 in) long, with 5–7 leaflets arranged around a common attachment point (i.e. they are palmate). The leaflets are glabrous (without hairs), measure up to 21 cm (8 in) long and 10 cm (3.9 in) wide, and their margins may be smooth, toothed or lobed.

The inflorescence is terminal and takes the form of an umbel of umbels of umbels - that is, a number of stalks of equal length emanate from a single point on the plant, which in turn branch from a common point into more stalks, and these finally branch into a number of flower stalks (pedicels), again of common length and attachment point, and each carrying a single flower. Individual flowers are about 2.5 mm (0.10 in) diameter and may be white, cream or green.

The fruit when ripe is a glaucous 2-lobed drupe about 10 mm (0.39 in) long and 15 mm (0.59 in) wide, which may be blue, purple, black or reddish. The remnants of the style and calyx usually persist at the apex, and they contain 1 or 2 cream to pale brown seeds.

=== Phenology ===
Flowering occurs from January to June, fruit have been observed from July to January.

== Taxonomy ==
This species was first formally published in 1909 by the English botanist William Botting Hemsley, in the journal Kew Bulletin of Miscellaneous Information (now known as Kew Bulletin).

=== Etymology ===
The genus Mackinlaya was erected by Mueller and named in honour of the Scottish-born Australian explorer John McKinlay (cited as "J. MacKinlay" by Mueller). The species epithet confusa is from the Latin confusus meaning confused, and is a reference to the complex branching (i.e. three times umbellate) of the inflorescence.

== Distribution and habitat ==
This species is endemic to Queensland and is found from the top of Cape York Peninsula, southwards along the east coast to Hinchinbrook Island. It grows in and adjacent to various types of rainforest, at altitudes from sea level up to 1,000 m (3,300 ft).

== Ecology ==
The fruit are eaten by cassowaries (Casuarius casuarius) and golden bowerbirds (Prionodura newtoniana).

== Conservation ==
This species is listed by the Queensland Government's Department of Environment, Science and Innovation as least concern. As of 29 March 2024, it has not been assessed by the International Union for Conservation of Nature (IUCN).

== Gallery ==
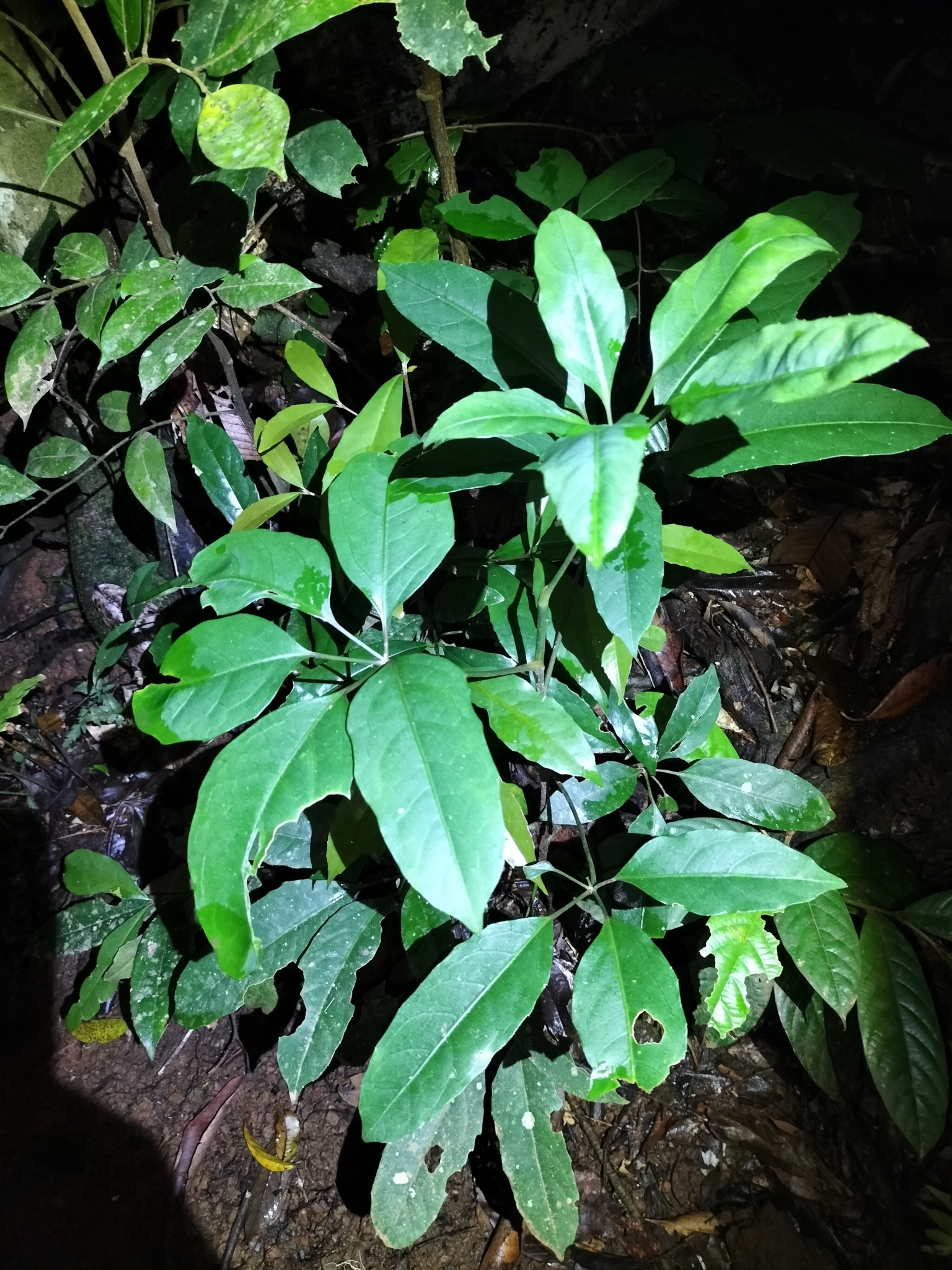
Habit

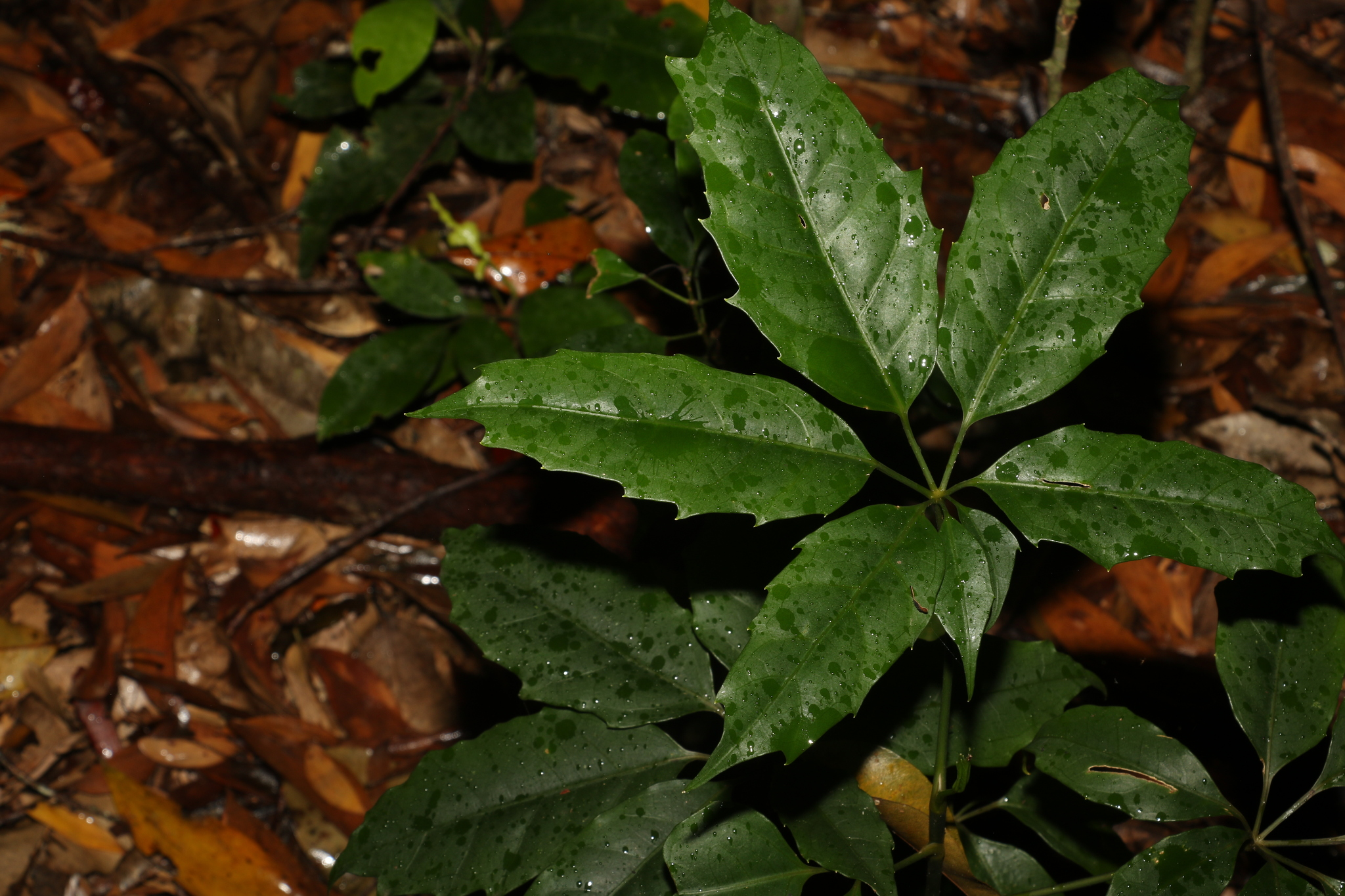
Common appearance of leaflets

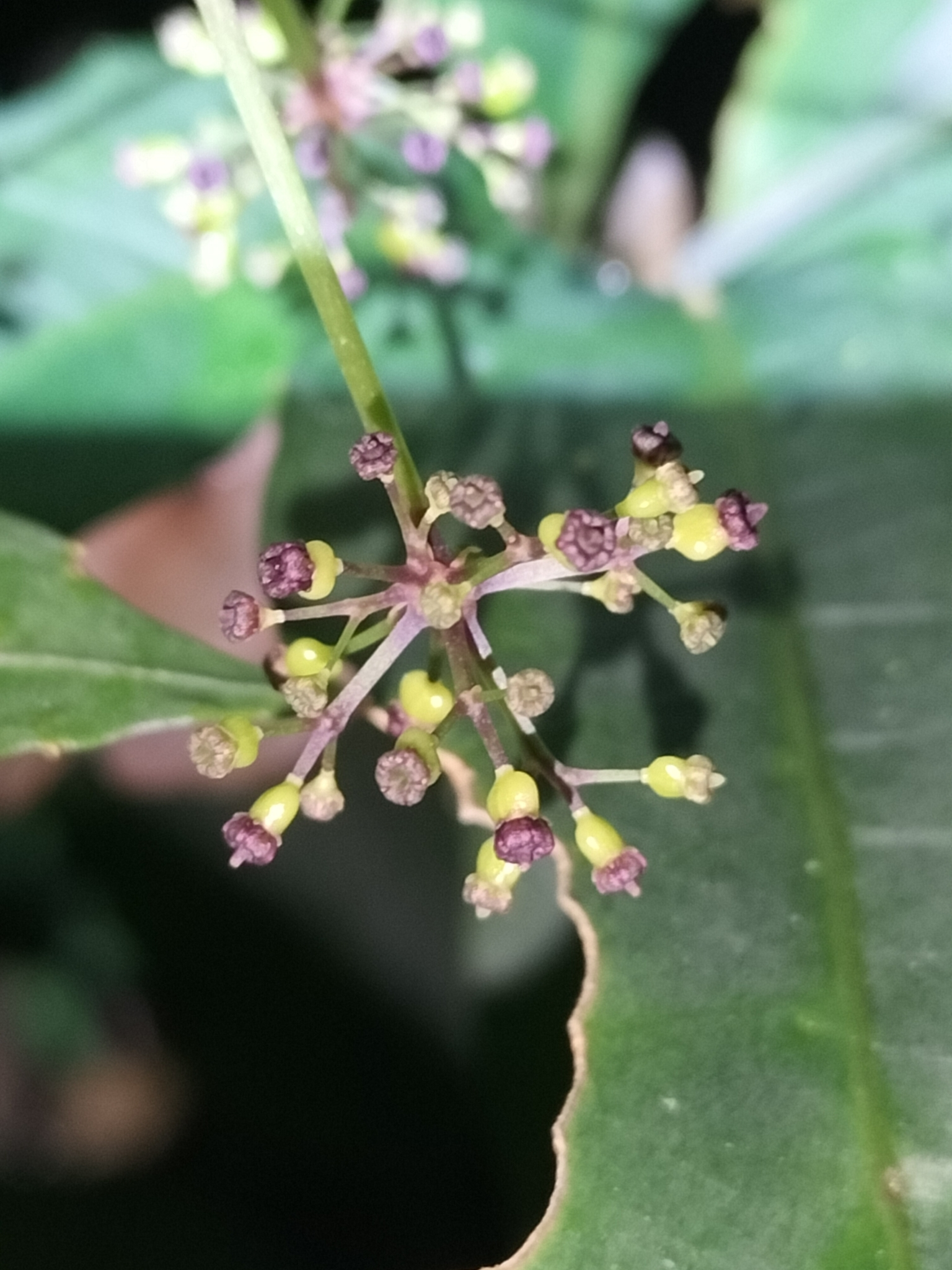
Close up of spent flowers, developing fruit

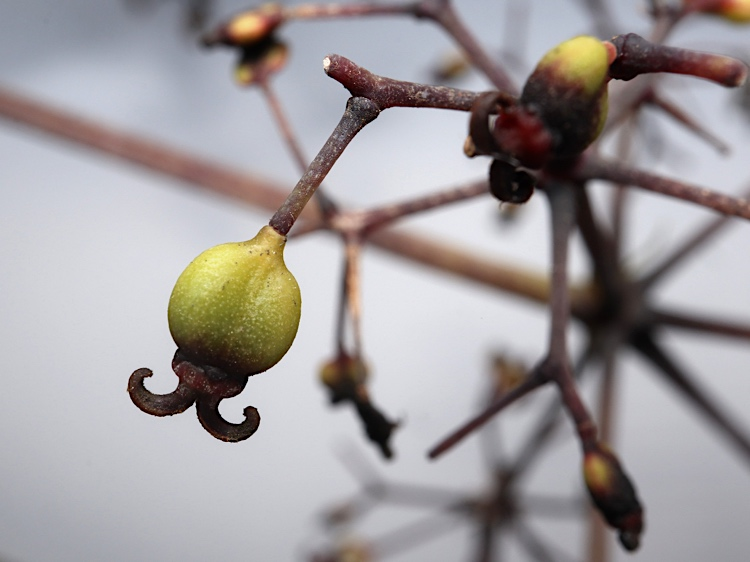
Close up of developing fruit with style and calyx attached

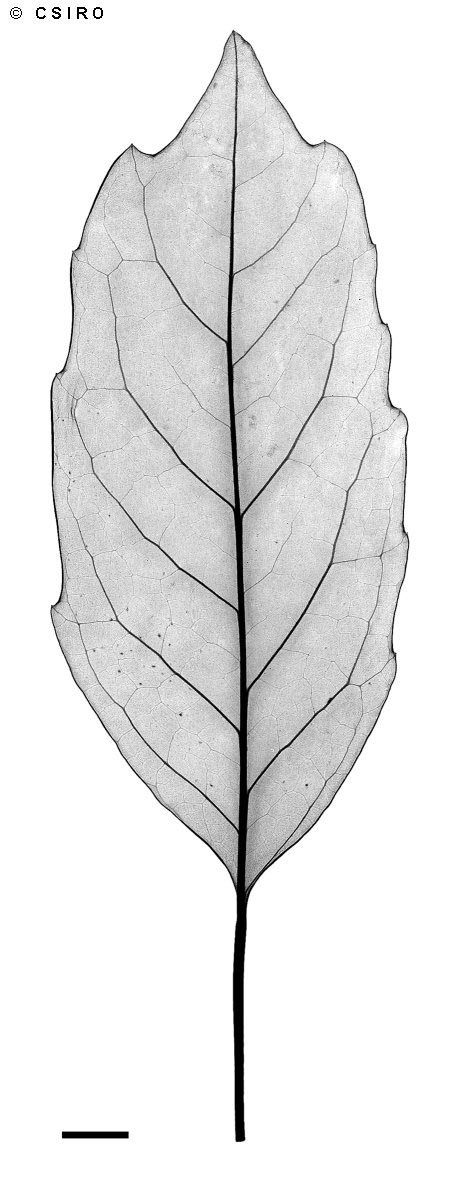
X-ray of leaf
