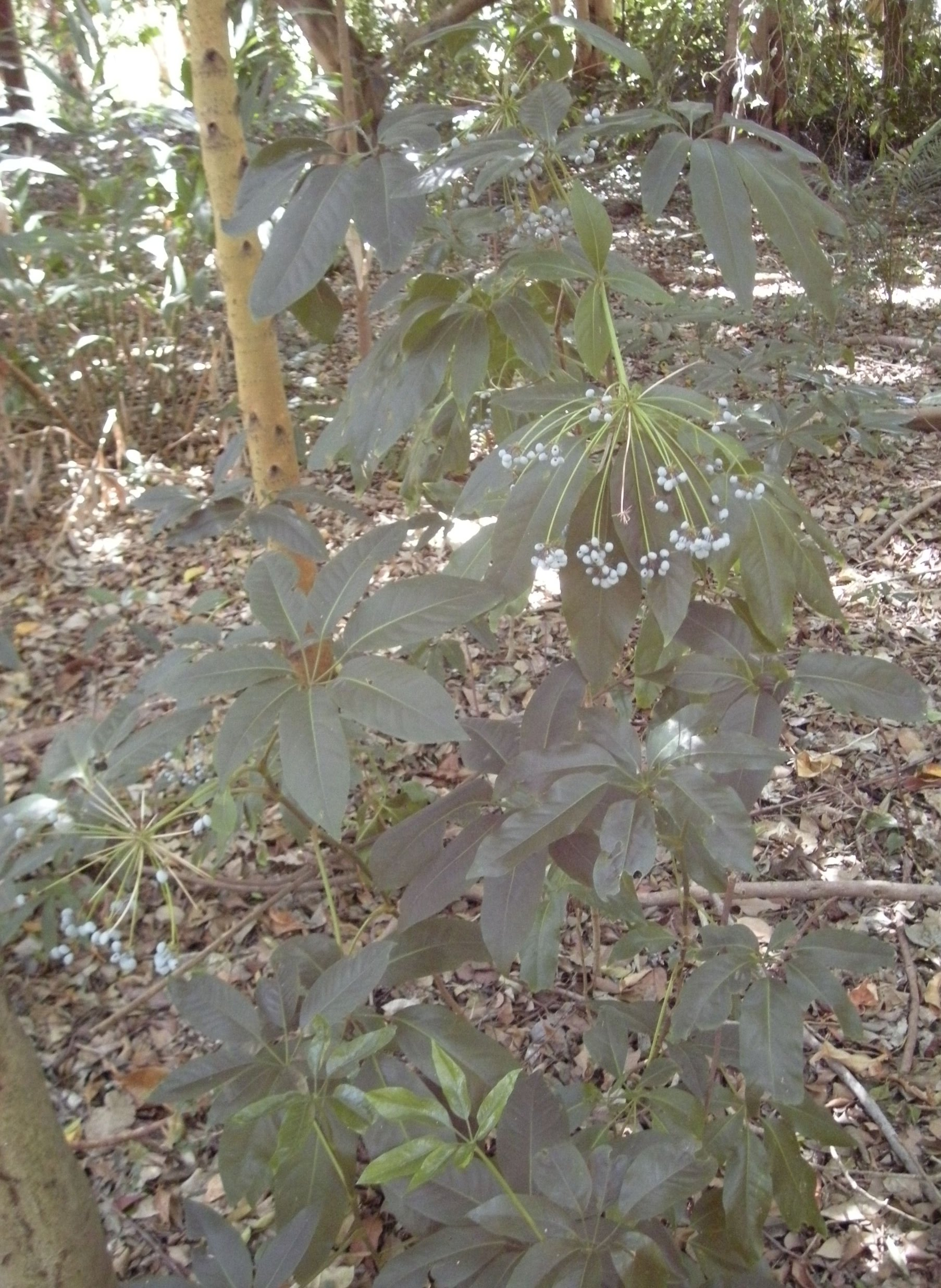
- Habit of Mackinlaya confusa, Australia

Scientific classification
- Kingdom: Plantae
- Clade: Tracheophytes
- Clade: Angiosperms
- Clade: Eudicots
- Clade: Asterids
- Order: Apiales
- Family: Apiaceae
- Subfamily: Mackinlayoideae
- Genus: Mackinlaya; F.Muell.

Synonyms
- Anomopanax Harms

= Mackinlaya =

Genus of flowering plants

Mackinlaya is a genus of flowering plants in the family Apiaceae, native to Malesia, Papuasia and Australia. It was formerly placed in Araliaceae.

== Species ==
The following five species are accepted by Plants of the World Online as of 29 March 2024:

- Mackinlaya celebica (Harms) Philipson – Philippines, Sulawesi, New Guinea, Bismarck Archipelago, Solomon Islands, Santa Cruz Islands.
- Mackinlaya confusa Hemsl. – Queensland.
- Mackinlaya macrosciadea (F.Muell.) F.Muell. – Northern Territory, Queensland.
- Mackinlaya radiata Philipson – New Guinea,
- Mackinlaya schlechteri (Harms) Philipson – New Guinea, Bismarck Archipelago,
