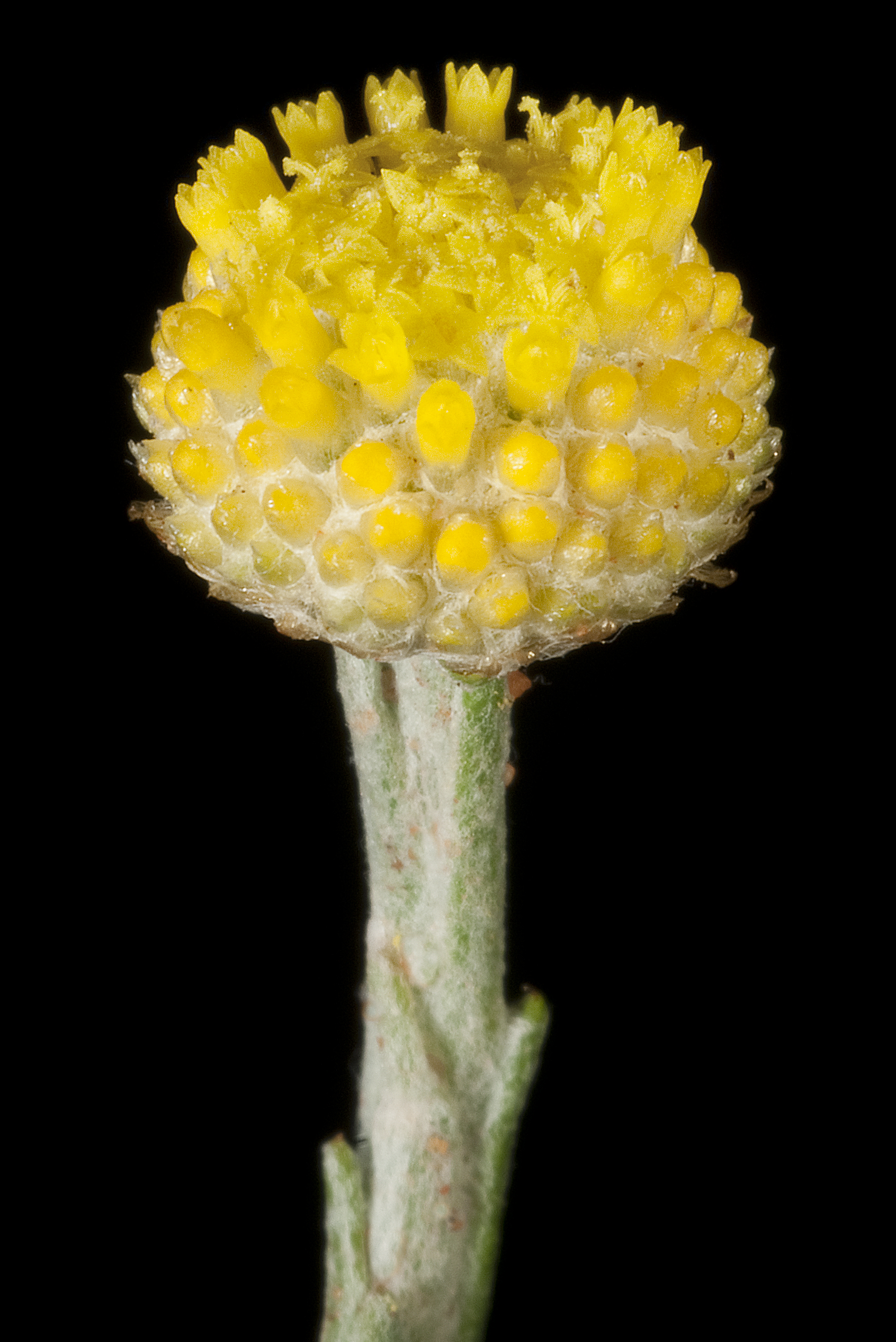

Scientific classification
- Kingdom: Plantae
- Clade: Tracheophytes
- Clade: Angiosperms
- Clade: Eudicots
- Clade: Asterids
- Order: Asterales
- Family: Asteraceae
- Genus: Trichanthodium
- Species: T. skirrophorum

Binomial name
- Trichanthodium skirrophorum Sond. & F.Muell. ex Sond.

= Trichanthodium skirrophorum =

Species of daisy

Trichanthodium skirrophorum (common name - Yellow woolly-heads) is a plant species in the Asteraceae family (daisies), first described by Otto Wilhelm Sonder and Ferdinand von Mueller in 1853.

It is an erect annual herb growing from 0.03 to 0.35 m high, and flowering from August to October.

It is found in all mainland states and territories of Australia, growing on floodplains, saline flats, claypans, sand or gypsum dunes, and ridges. In Victoria, it is considered "vulnerable".

== Gallery ==
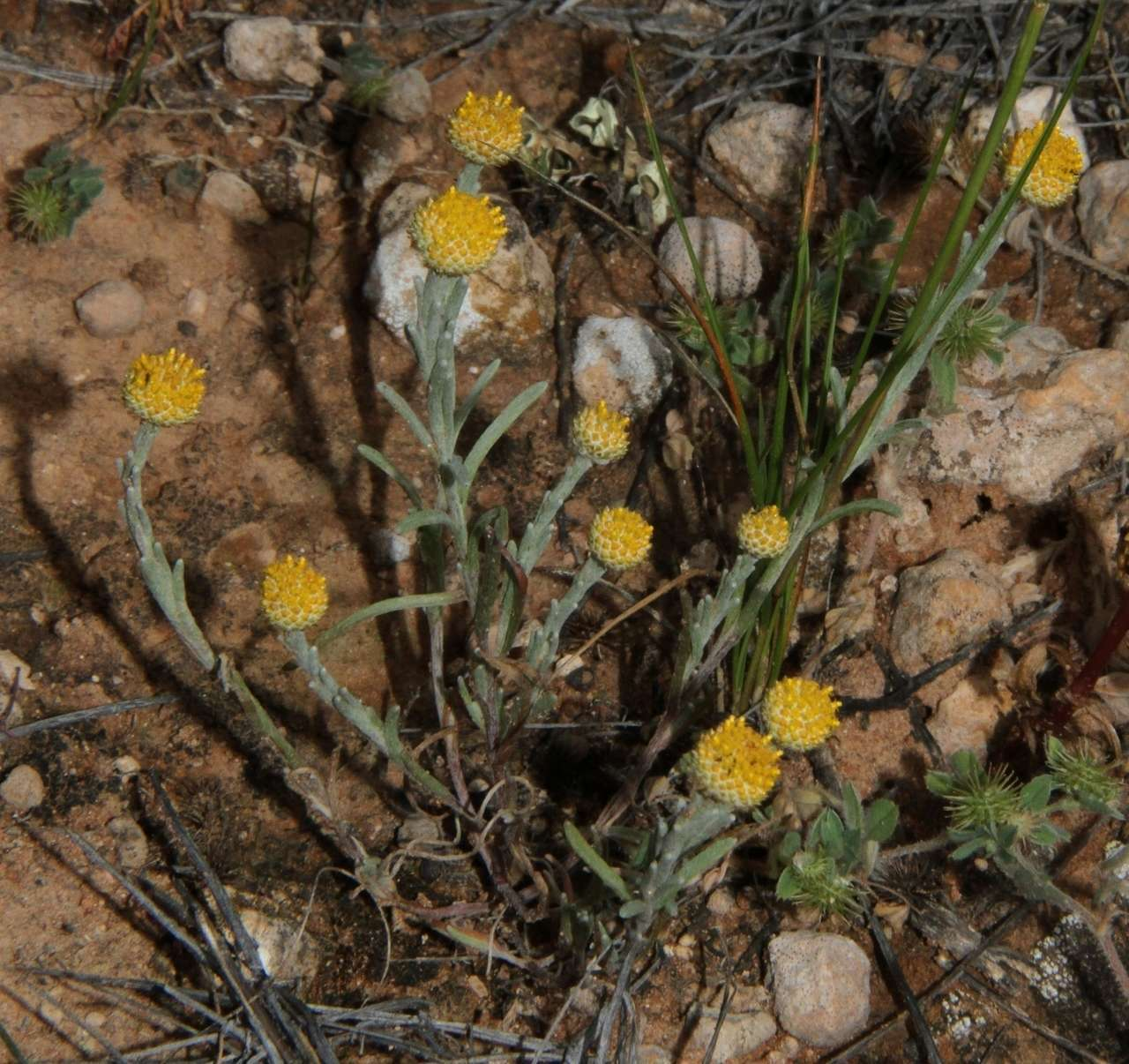

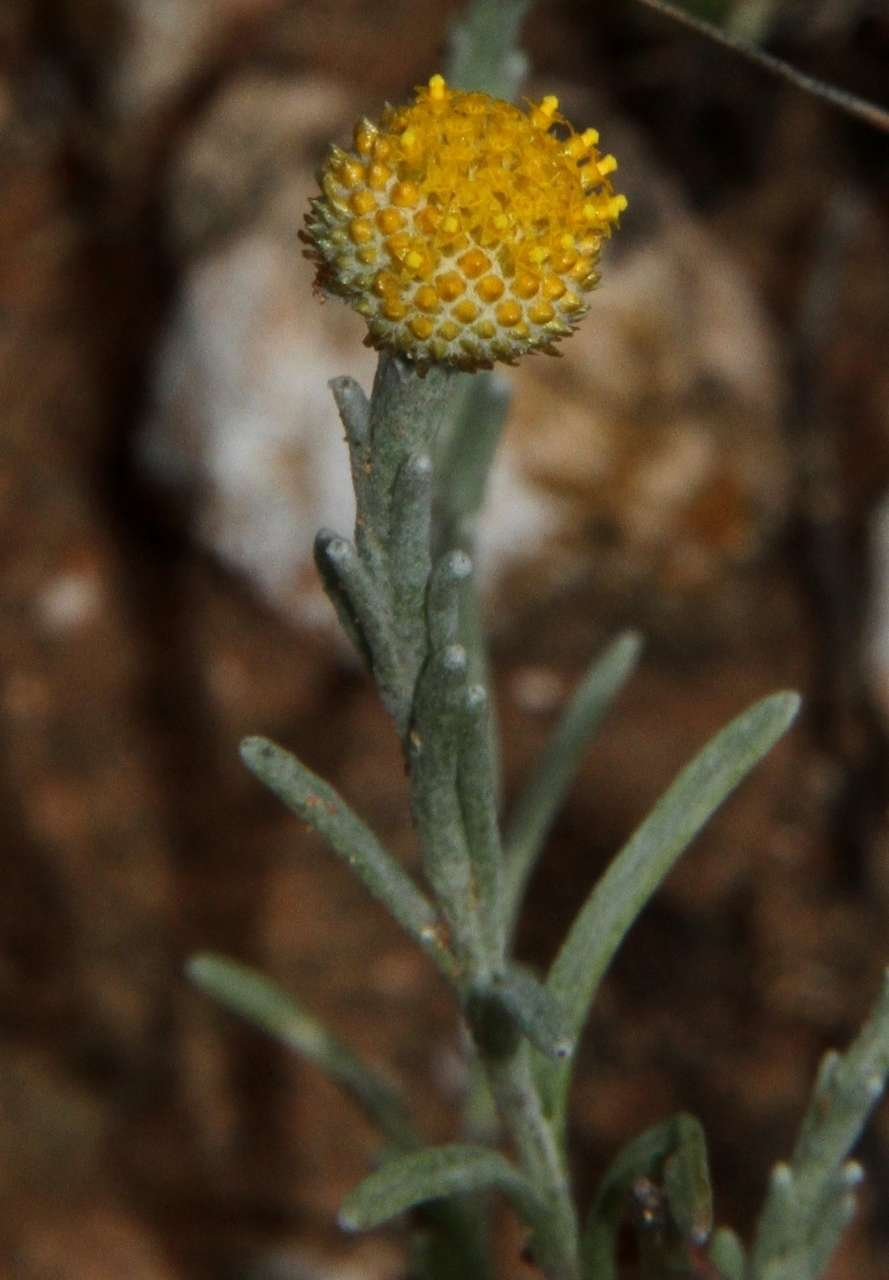

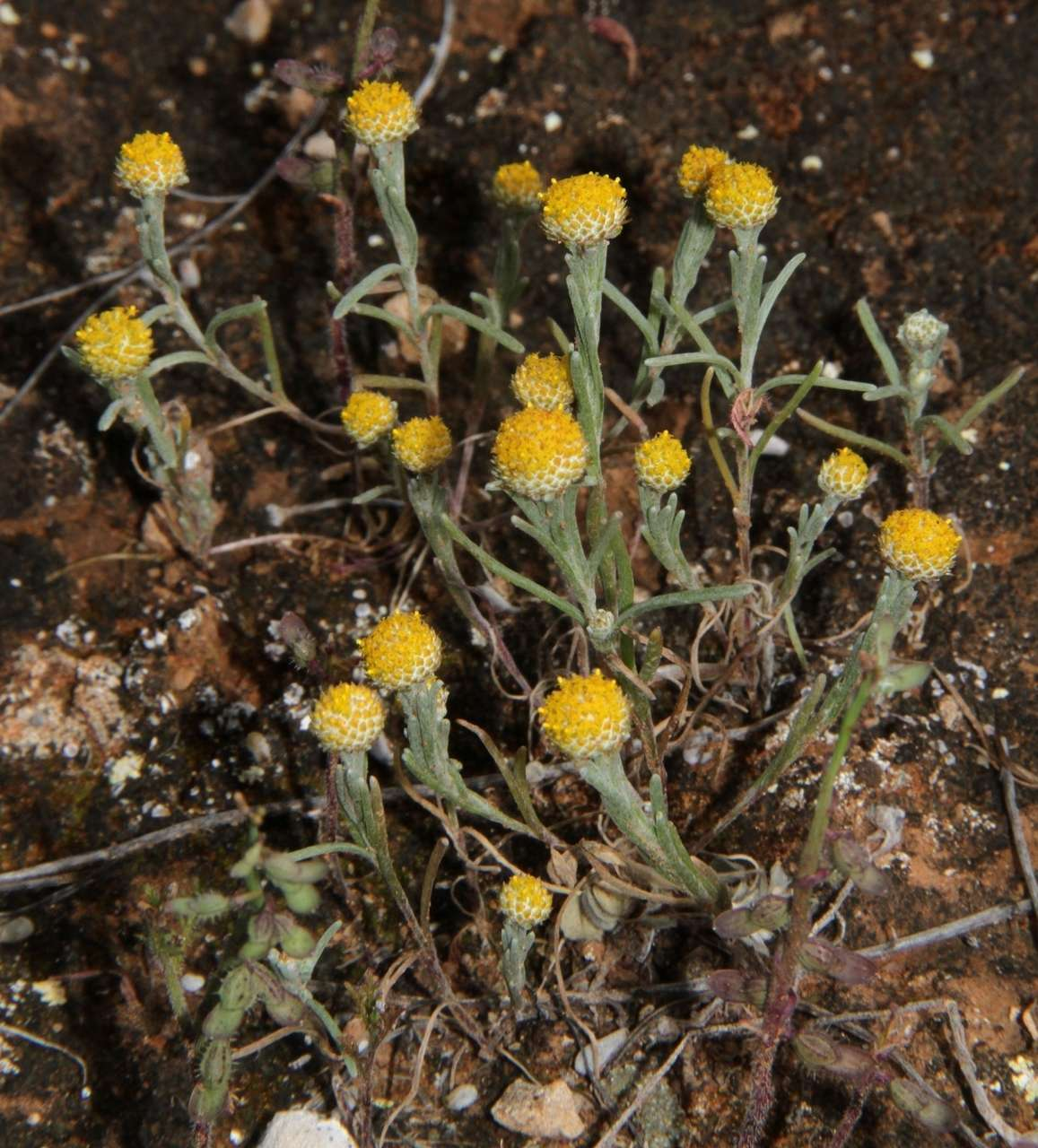
