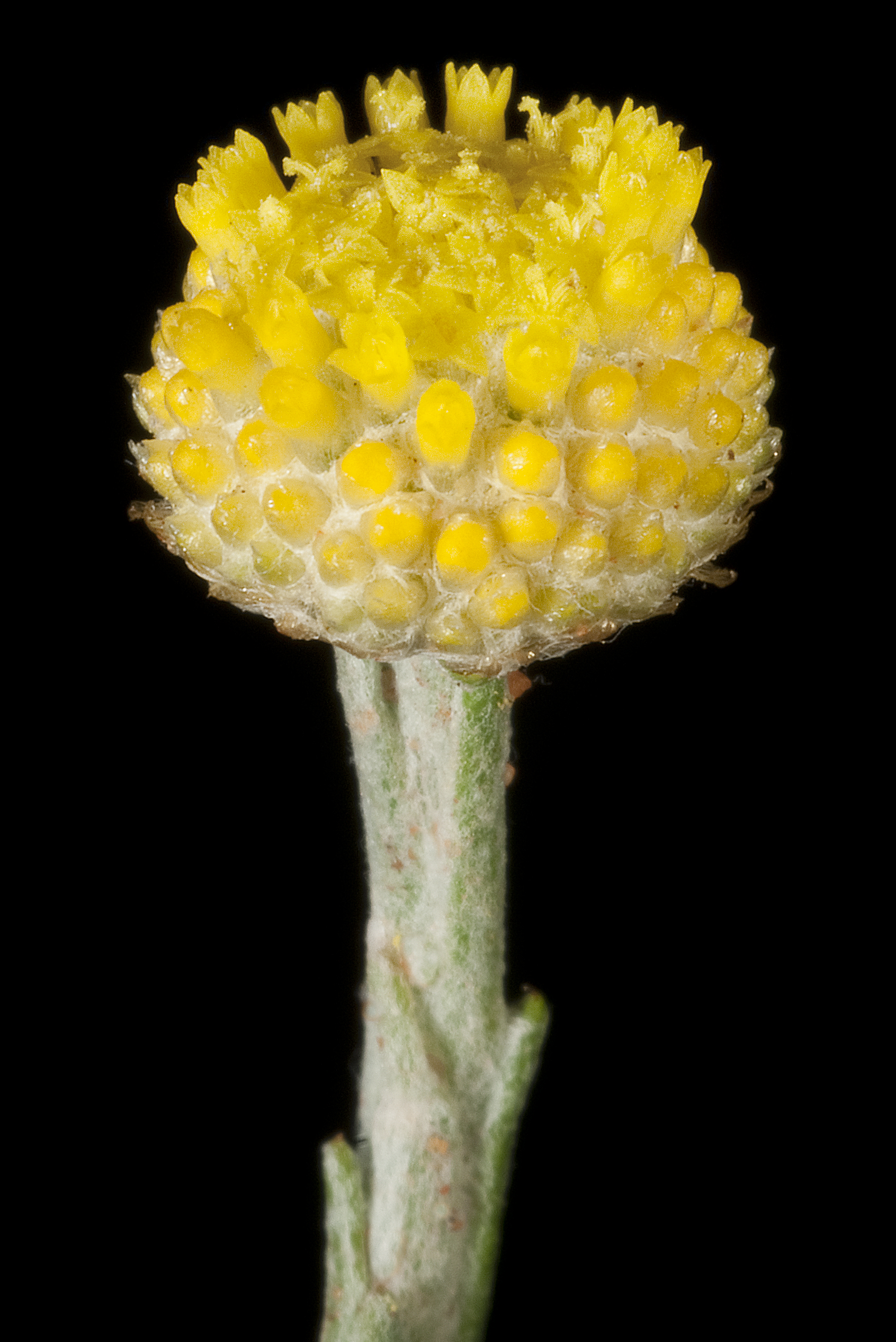
- Trichanthodium skirrophorum

Scientific classification
- Kingdom: Plantae
- Clade: Tracheophytes
- Clade: Angiosperms
- Clade: Eudicots
- Clade: Asterids
- Order: Asterales
- Family: Asteraceae
- Subfamily: Asteroideae
- Tribe: Gnaphalieae
- Genus: Trichanthodium; Sonder & F.Muell.

Type species
- Trichanthodium skirrophorum Sonder & F.Muell.

= Trichanthodium =

Genus of plants

Trichanthodium is a genus of Australian plants in the tribe Gnaphalieae within the family Asteraceae.

Species

- Trichanthodium baracchianum (Ewart & Jean White) P.S.Short - Victoria
- Trichanthodium exilis (W.Fitzg.) P.S.Short - Western Australia
- Trichanthodium scarlettianum P.S.Short - Western Australia
- Trichanthodium skirrophorum Sond. & F.Muell. - Western Australia, South Australia, Northern Territory, Queensland, New South Wales, Victoria
