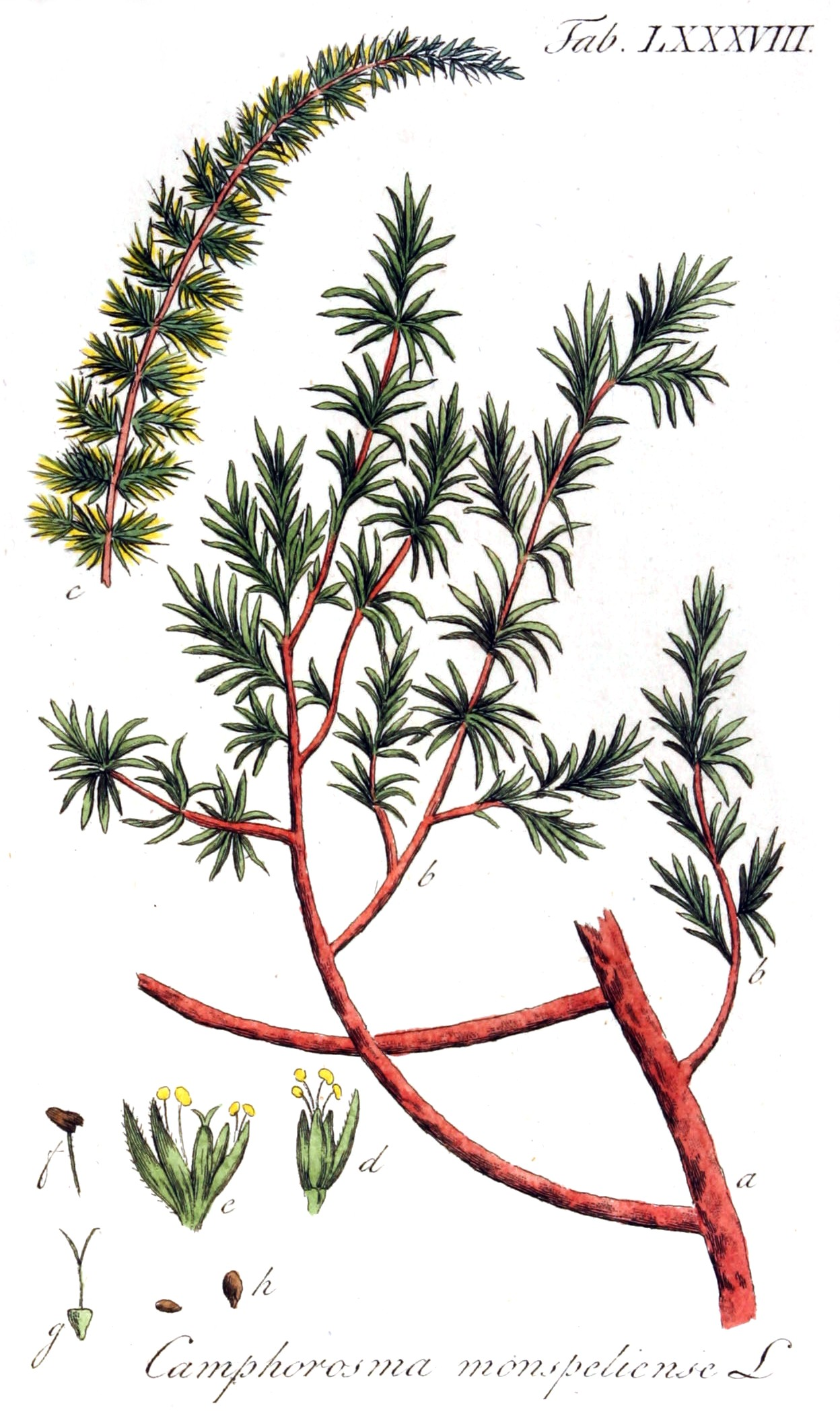
- Camphorosma monspeliaca, Illustration

Scientific classification
- Kingdom: Plantae
- Clade: Tracheophytes
- Clade: Angiosperms
- Clade: Eudicots
- Order: Caryophyllales
- Family: Amaranthaceae
- Subfamily: Camphorosmoideae; A. J. Scott
- Tribe: Camphorosmeae; Moq.

Genera
- About 20 genera, see text

= Camphorosmeae =

Tribe of flowering plants

Camphorosmeae is a species-rich tribe of the Amaranthaceae, formerly Chenopodiaceae, with 20 genera and about 179 species. It is classified as a single tribe of subfamily Camphorosmoideae.

== Description ==
Camphorosmeae species are mostly dwarf shrubs or annuals (rarely perennial herbs) with spreading or ascending branches. The plants are more or less densely covered with appressed or spreading hairs. The alternate leaves are often succulent, only a few annual species have thin and flat leaves.

The inconspicuous flowers sit solitary or in axillary clusters of 2–3 (5) in the axil of a subtending bract. They differ from the related subfamily Salsoloideae by the absence of bracteoles. The flowers are mostly bisexual. The perianth consists of (3–) 5 membranous or scarious tepals, which are often fused for about 1/5 to 4/5 of their length. 4–5 stamens are basally fused in a hypogynous disc. They have mostly exserted anthers without appendages. The pollen grains differ from Salsoloideae by greater diameter, and higher number of smaller pores with fewer spinulae per operculum. The horizontal or more rarely vertical ovary is uniovulate, with a distinct style and 2 filiform stigmas with papillae on the entire surface.

The perianth persists end encloses the fruit. The tepals can enlarge or develop wings, spines or long hairs, or become fleshy or woody. The seed with thin testa contains an annular or folded embryo sometimes engirdling a rudimentary central perisperm.

== Photosynthesis pathway ==
The species of Chenolea clade and the large Sclerolaena clade are C_{3} plants. In the Bassia/Camphorosma clade, all species are C_{4} plants except Sedobassia sedioides which is C_{3}–C_{4} intermediate.

== Distribution and evolution ==
The Camphorosmeae are distributed in mainly in Australia (c. 147 species) and in the temperate and subtropical regions of the northern hemisphere: Eurasia including North Africa (c. 27 species), and North America (2 species), in South Africa (3 species). A few species are naturalized worldwide.

They grow in different habitats as shores, salt marshes and deserts in mediterranean climate to forests, steppes and deserts in climates with summer rains, from the Sahara to the alpine zone in Central Asia. Very often they grow in dry, saline or disturbed (ruderal) sites.

The group evolved in the Early Miocene, probably deriving from halophytic plants growing at seashores in a warm-temperate climate. The species of the Chenolea clade are regarded as remnants of an early line of evolution. The subfamily spread from Eurasia to Australia, North America and at least two times to South Africa. The Australian lineage diversified strongly, the other lineages remained species-poor.

== Systematics ==
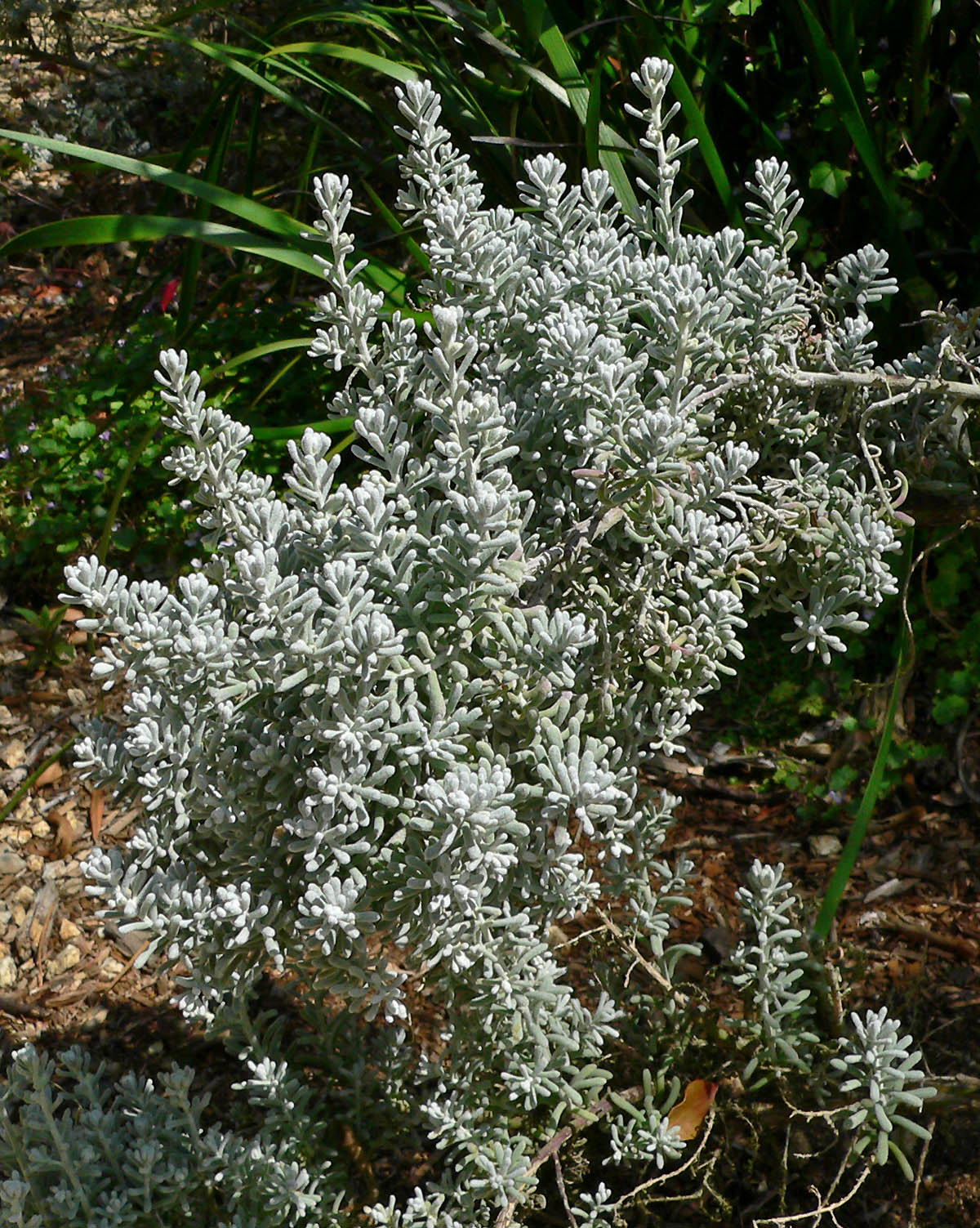
Maireana sedifolia

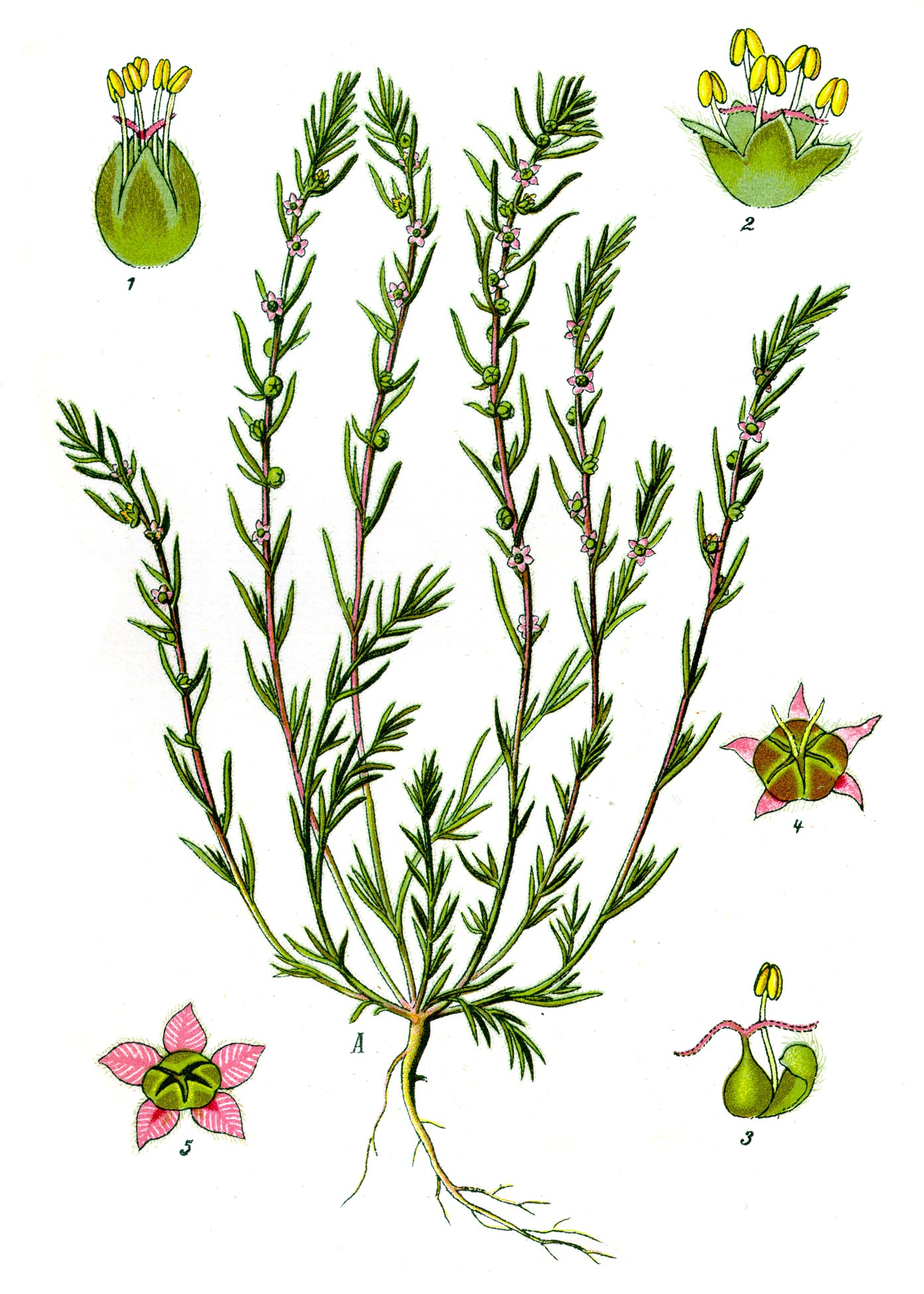
Bassia laniflora, illustration

The taxon "Camphorosmeae" has been published in 1837 by Stephan Ladislaus Endlicher as a subtribe within the Chenopodieae. Alfred Moquin-Tandon classified it as a tribe in 1840, and A J Scott raised it to subfamily level as "Camphorosmoideae" in 1978.

Phylogenetic research by Kadereit & Freitag (2011) revealed that the traditional classification of the group did not reflect evolutionary relationships. Most of the genera, especially Kochia and Bassia, were found to be highly polyphyletic, so some of their species had to be transferred to separate genera: Eokochia, Spirobassia, Grubovia and Sedobassia.

The Australian species of Camphorosmeae form a relatively young group still in the process of speciation and with some hybridization between species. In phylogenetic research by Cabrera et al. (2009), the genera were not clearly separated. Probably Neobassia, Threlkeldia and Osteocarpum should be included in Sclerolaena. Likewise, Enchylaena should be included in Maireana. The species-rich genera Sclerolaena and Maireana were found to be polyphyletic, so that further investigations are needed.

=== Bassia/Camphorosma clade ===
C_{4} plants (except Sedobassia sedoides which is intermediate). Widely distributed in Eurasia and southern Africa

- Bassia All., (Syn. Kochia, Londesia, Panderia, Kirilowia, Chenoleioides), with about 20 annual and subshrubby species, native from western Mediterranean to East Asia, introduced in America and northern Europa.
- Camphorosma L., with 4 species, from western Mediterranean to Central Asia
  - Camphorosma annua Pall., annual, from Hungary to eastern Ukraine
  - Camphorosma lessingii Litv., subshrub, from Transcaucasia to South Siberia
  - Camphorosma monspeliaca L., subshrub from West Europe to South Siberia
  - Camphorosma songorica Bunge, annual, from lower Wolga to Central Asia
- Sedobassia Freitag & G. Kadereit, with one species
  - Sedobassia sedoides (Pall.) Freitag & G. Kadereit (Syn. Bassia sedoides (Pall.) Asch.), annual, from Hungary to Siberia

=== Chenolea clade ===
C_{3} plants. With 4 genera and 5 disjunct species.

- Chenolea Thunb., with one species
  - Chenolea diffusa Thunb., a subshrub in southern Africa
- Eokochia Freitag & G. Kadereit, with one species
  - Eokochia saxicola (Guss.) Freitag & G. Kadereit (Syn. Kochia saxicola Guss.), a subshrub, endemic on the Mediterranean islands Ischia, Capri and Stromboli
- Neokochia (Ulbr.) G.L.Chu & S. C. Sand., with 2 species in southwestern North America
  - Neokochia americana (S. Watson) G.L.Chu & S .C. Sand. (Syn. Kochia americana S. Watson), a subshrub in southwestern North America
  - Neokochia californica (S. Watson) G.L.Chu & S. C. Sand., a subshrub in southwestern North America
- Spirobassia Freitag & G. Kadereit, with one species
  - Spirobassia hirsuta (L.) Freitag & G. Kadereit (Syn. Bassia hirsuta (L.) Asch.): annual, from North Mediterranean to South Siberia.

=== Sclerolaena clade ===
C_{3} plants.

- Grubovia subclade, with 3 species in Central Asia:
  - Grubovia Freitag & G. Kadereit, with 3 species in Central Asia
    - Grubovia dasyphylla (Fisch. & C. A. Mey.) Freitag & G. Kadereit (Syn. Bassia dasyphylla (Fisch. & C. A. Mey.) Kuntze): annual, from eastern Kazakhstan to Mongolia.
    - Grubovia krylovii (Litv.) Freitag & G. Kadereit (Syn. Kochia krylovii Litv.): annual, from the Altai mountains to Mongolia.
    - Grubovia melanoptera (Bunge) Freitag & G. Kadereit (Syn. Kochia melanoptera Bunge): annual, form Tian Shan mountains to Mongolia.
- Sclerolaena subclade, with about 147 species in Australia:
  - Didymanthus Endl., with only one species:
    - Didymanthus roei Endl., in Australia
  - Dissocarpus F. Muell., with 4 species in Australia
  - Enchylaena R.Br., with 2 species in Australia. This genus should be included in Maireana
  - Eremophea Paul G.Wilson, with 2 species in Australia
  - Eriochiton (R. H. Anderson) A. J. Scott, with only one species:
    - Eriochiton sclerolaenoides (F. Muell.) F. Muell. ex A. J. Scott, in Australia
  - Maireana Moq., with about 57 species in Australia. This genus is polyphyletic
  - Malacocera R. H. Anderson, with 4 species in Australia
  - Neobassia A. J. Scott, with 2 species in Australia. This genus should be included in Sclerolaena
  - Osteocarpum F. Muell., with 5 species in Australia. This genus should be included in Sclerolaena
  - Roycea C. A. Gardner, with 3 species in Australia
  - Sclerolaena R. Br. (incl. Sclerochlamys F. Muell., Stelligera A. J. Scott), with 64 species in Australia. This genus is polyphyletic.
  - Threlkeldia R. Br., with 2 species in Australia. This genus should be included in Sclerolaena

== Economic importance ==
Some species of Camphorosmeae are of limited economic interest. Bassia scoparia var. trichophylla is cultivated as an ornamental plant ("summer-cypress"). Bassia prostrata is increasingly important for the improvement of rangeland and phytoremediation. Bassia indica and Bassia scoparia are used as forage plants. Camphorosma monspeliaca is a traditional medicinal herb.
