= Kochia =

Genus of plants

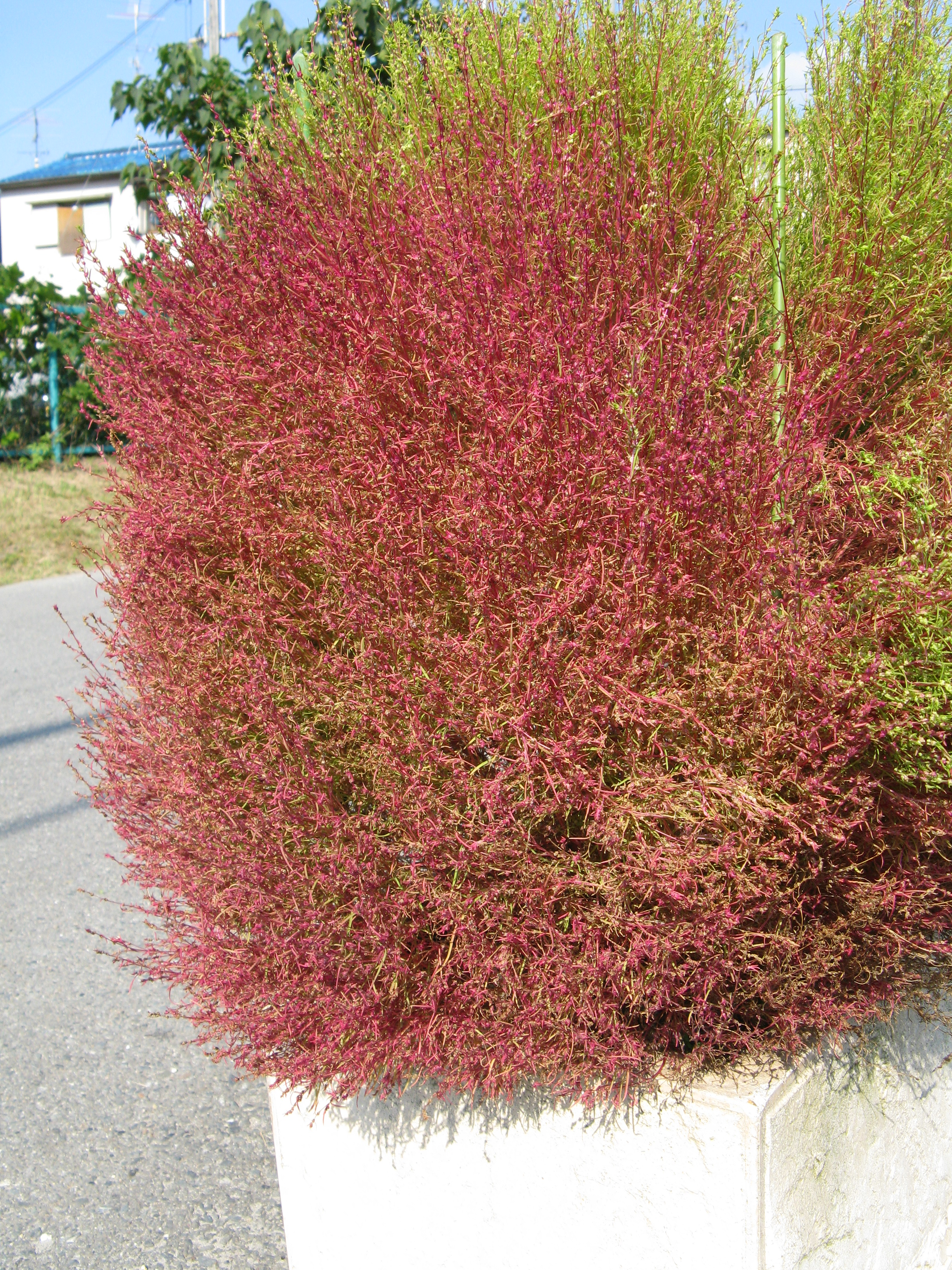
Kochia scoparia

Kochia /ˈkoʊkiə/ is a synonym of the genus Bassia, which belongs to the subfamily Camphorosmoideae of family Amaranthaceae.

Two American species traditionally included in Kochia are now in genus Neokochia: Neokochia americana and Neokochia californica.
