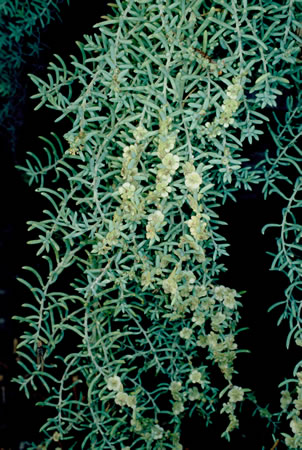

Conservation status
- Endangered (IUCN 3.1)

Scientific classification
- Kingdom: Plantae
- Clade: Embryophytes
- Clade: Tracheophytes
- Clade: Spermatophytes
- Clade: Angiosperms
- Clade: Eudicots
- Order: Caryophyllales
- Family: Amaranthaceae
- Subfamily: Camphorosmoideae
- Tribe: Camphorosmeae
- Genus: Eokochia; Freitag & G.Kadereit
- Species: E. saxicola

Binomial name
- Eokochia saxicola (Guss.) Freitag & G.Kadereit

Synonyms
- Bassia saxicola (Guss.) A.J.Scott; Kochia saxicola Guss.

= Eokochia =

Rare plant genus in the amaranth family

Eokochia is a monotypic genus of flowering plants belonging to the amaranth family. The only species is Eokochia saxicola, a very rare plant only found in Italy.

== Description ==
Eokochia saxicola is a subshrub with some lignin in its stems and quite succulent leaves that are nearly terete, round in cross section. The structure of the leaf is unusual with a central vascular bundle and two complex side bundles in a single plane. The twisted main stems can reach lengths of 15 to 30 centimeters (5.9–11.8 in) and hang downwards from the rock faces. The stems are gray-green with groves along their length. The leaves generally curve towards branch tips and measure 6–25 millimeters long, though usually not longer than 12 mm, with a diameter of about 1 mm.

The fruits can be single or in clusters of up to three. They are somewhat brownish-olive colored measuring 5–6 mm with smooth edged, curving, fan shaped wings of 2 by 2.5 mm. Each fruit has five of these persistent perianth wings.

== Taxonomy ==
The species was first scientifically described in 1855 by Giovanni Gussone and named Kochia saxicola. The specimens he described were found on the island of Ischia on a rocky, dry slope near a place called 'S. Anna'. In 1978 the species was moved to the genus Bassia by Andrew John Scott. In 2011 the botanists Helmut E. Freitag and Gudrun Kadereit described and named a new genus called Eokochia containing Eokochia saxicola as its sole species. The genus is classified as part of the Amaranthaceae family. It is most closely related four other species that are widely separated in geographic distribution, Spirobassia hirsuta from Europe and western Asia, Neokochia americana from the western United States, Neokochia californica from eastern California and western Nevada, and Chenolea diffusa from Mozambique, Namibia, and South Africa. Though geographically closer to Spirobassia hirsuta, Eokochia saxicola is most closely related to Neokochia americana and Neokochia californica.

The genus is named for Wilhelm Daniel Joseph Koch (1771–1849), a German physician and botanist, the authors saying in their description that they chose it "because this species evidently is a relict of a very old lineage."

== Distribution and habitat ==
Eokochia saxicola is endemic to Italy and only known from five locations. One on the island of Ischia, two on Capri, Strombolicchio near Stromboli, and finally the recently discovered location in Cilento, Vallo di Diano and Alburni National Park on the mainland in Campania. All the known populations are near the Tyrrhenian Sea, west of Italy. In 2004 the plant had a known population of approximately 30 mature plants on Strombolicchio and 100 on Capri, but was probably locally extinct on Ischia. The population in Strombolicchio grow on the northern cliffs of the island. A few plants cultivated at the Botanical Garden of Naples were reintroduced to Ischia around 2013 near the site where Gussone first saw the plant.

Most of its habit is exposed rock on the coast of its islands and is adapted to the salt spray it is exposed to there.
