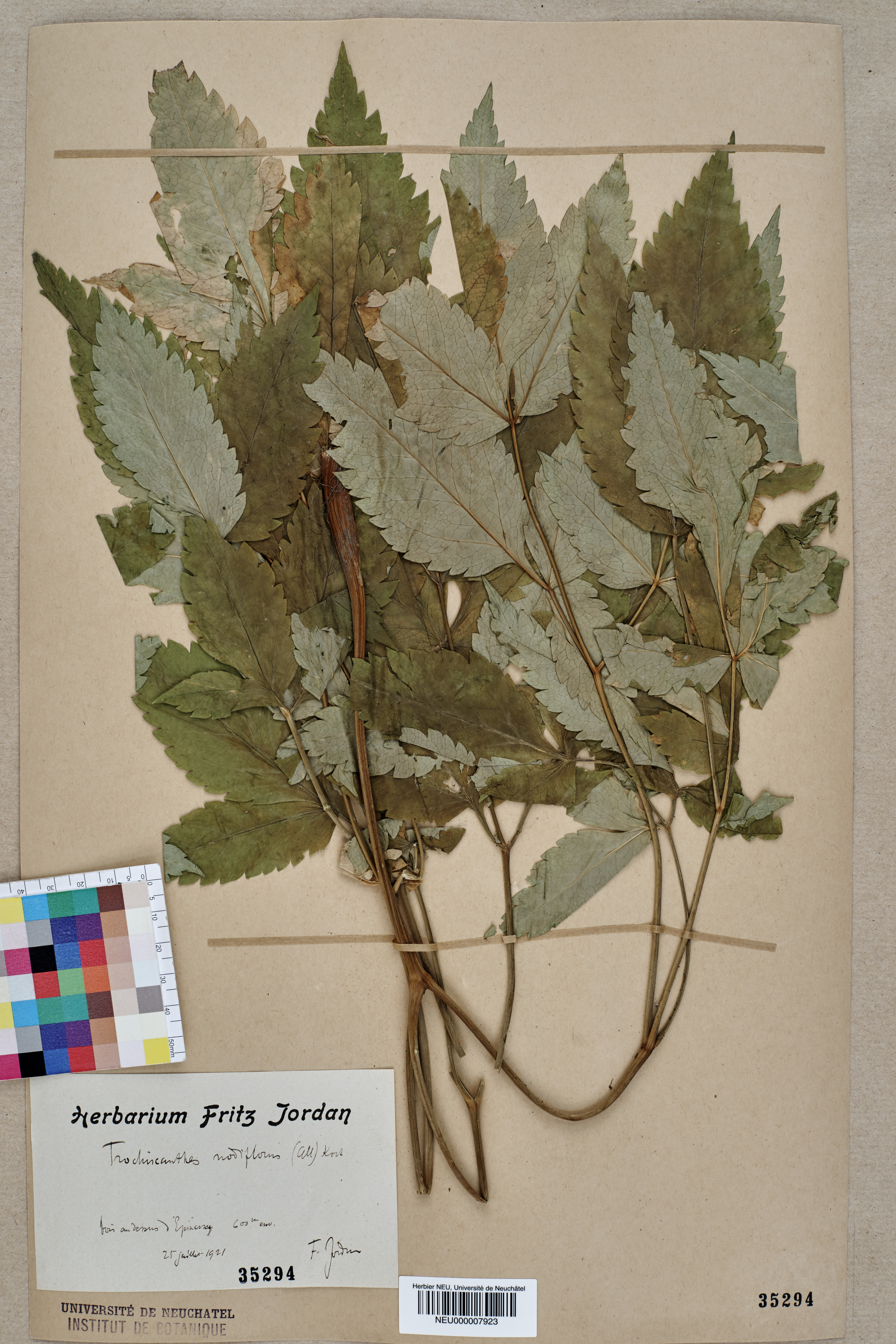

Scientific classification
- Kingdom: Plantae
- Clade: Tracheophytes
- Clade: Angiosperms
- Clade: Eudicots
- Clade: Asterids
- Order: Apiales
- Family: Apiaceae
- Genus: Trochiscanthes; W.D.J.Koch
- Species: T. nodiflora

Binomial name
- Trochiscanthes nodiflora (All.) W.D.J.Koch

Synonyms
- Trochiscanthes nodiflorus orth. var.; Ligusticum nodiflorum All.; Magdaris nodiflora (All.) Raf.; Podopetalum nodiflorum (All.) Gaudin; Silerium nodiflorum (All.) Raf.; Smyrnium nodiflorum (All.) All.; Angelica paniculata Lam.; Imperatoria nodiflora Lam.; Laserpitium aquilegiifolium Ten., nom. illeg.; Schnizleinia nodiflora Steud., not validly publ.

= Trochiscanthes =

Genus of flowering plants

Trochiscanthes is a genus of flowering plants belonging to the family Apiaceae. It has only one species, Trochiscanthes nodiflora. Its native range is Central Europe.

Some sources spell the epithet nodiflorus. However, genus names ending in -anthes are treated as feminine.
