= Coleophora tringella =

Scientific classification
- Kingdom: Animalia
- Phylum: Arthropoda
- Clade: Pancrustacea
- Class: Insecta
- Order: Lepidoptera
- Family: Coleophoridae
- Genus: Coleophora
- Species: C. tringella

Binomial name
- Coleophora tringella Baldizzone, 1988

Species of moth

Coleophora tringella is a moth of the family Coleophoridae. It is found in southern Russia, Kazakhstan and Turkey. It occurs in desert-steppe and desert biotopes.

Adults are on wing from late May to June.

The larvae feed on Kochia prostrata. They feed on the generative organs of their host plant.
