= Coleophora remizella =

Scientific classification
- Kingdom: Animalia
- Phylum: Arthropoda
- Clade: Pancrustacea
- Class: Insecta
- Order: Lepidoptera
- Family: Coleophoridae
- Genus: Coleophora
- Species: C. remizella

Binomial name
- Coleophora remizella Baldizzone, 1983

Species of moth

Coleophora remizella is a moth of the family Coleophoridae. It is found in Slovakia, Hungary, Romania, Bulgaria and southern Russia.

The larvae feed on Kochia prostrata. They feed on the generative organs of their host plant.
