= Coleophora parasymi =

Scientific classification
- Kingdom: Animalia
- Phylum: Arthropoda
- Class: Insecta
- Order: Lepidoptera
- Family: Coleophoridae
- Genus: Coleophora
- Species: C. parasymi

Binomial name
- Coleophora parasymi (Anikin, 2005)

Synonyms
- Ecebalia parasymi Anikin, 2005

Species of moth

Coleophora parasymi is a moth of the family Coleophoridae. It is found in the lower Volga area in southern Russia.

The larvae feed on Kochia prostrata.
