= Coleophora charadriella =

Scientific classification
- Kingdom: Animalia
- Phylum: Arthropoda
- Clade: Pancrustacea
- Class: Insecta
- Order: Lepidoptera
- Family: Coleophoridae
- Genus: Coleophora
- Species: C. charadriella

Binomial name
- Coleophora charadriella Baldizzone, 1988

Synonyms
- Ecebalia charadriella

Species of moth

Coleophora charadriella is a moth of the family Coleophoridae. It is found in the Ural.

Adults are on wing from late May to June.

The larvae feed on Kochia prostrata. They feed on the generative organs of their host plant.
