= Bassia arabica =

Scientific classification
- Kingdom: Plantae
- Clade: Tracheophytes
- Clade: Angiosperms
- Clade: Eudicots
- Order: Caryophyllales
- Family: Amaranthaceae
- Genus: Bassia
- Species: B. arabica

Binomial name
- Bassia arabica (Boiss.) Maire & Weiller

Synonyms
- Chenolea arabica Boiss.; Chenoleoides arabica (Boiss.) Botsch.; Kirilowia arabica (Boiss.) G.L.Chu

Species of plant

Bassia arabica is a species of flowering plant in the family Amaranthaceae. It is native to Libya, Egypt, the Sinai peninsula, the Levant, Saudi Arabia, and the Gulf States. An annual subshrub, it is a halophyte.
