= Coleophora saratovi =

Scientific classification
- Kingdom: Animalia
- Phylum: Arthropoda
- Class: Insecta
- Order: Lepidoptera
- Family: Coleophoridae
- Genus: Coleophora
- Species: C. saratovi

Binomial name
- Coleophora saratovi (Anikin, 2005)

Synonyms
- Casignetella saratovi Anikin, 2005

Species of moth

Coleophora saratovi is a moth of the family Coleophoridae. It is found in the lower Volga area in southern Russia.

The larvae feed on Kochia prostrata.
