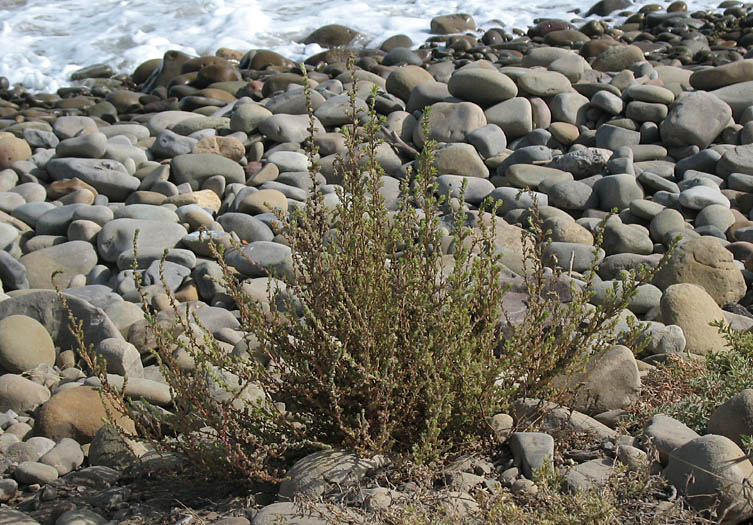

Scientific classification
- Kingdom: Plantae
- Clade: Tracheophytes
- Clade: Angiosperms
- Clade: Eudicots
- Order: Caryophyllales
- Family: Amaranthaceae
- Genus: Bassia
- Species: B. hyssopifolia

Binomial name
- Bassia hyssopifolia (Pall.) Kuntze

= Bassia hyssopifolia =

Species of flowering plant

Bassia hyssopifolia is a species of flowering plant in the family Amaranthaceae, known by the common names five-horn smotherweed, five-hook bassia, and thorn orache. It is native to parts of Asia and Eastern Europe, and it is known on other continents as an introduced species, including North and South America and Australia. It is a weed, invasive at times.

The Latin word hyssopifolia (which also occurs in several other plant names, for example that of Cuphea hyssopifolia) means "hyssop-leafed".

== Description ==
This species is an annual herb with simple or branching stems usually growing up to a metre tall, or sometimes taller. The leaf blades are flat and linear to lance-shaped. The lowest leaves are up to 6 centimetres long. The inflorescence is a short, narrow spike occupying the upper stem. It is lined with woolly-haired flowers growing solitary, paired, or in clusters of three. The small flower has five segments, each of which has a hooked spine at maturity. The fruit is less than 2 millimetres long. The hooked spines of the flower persist on the dry fruit.

This species resembles kochia (Bassia scoparia), but it has longer, hairier flower spikes. It has been mistaken for Russian thistle (Kali tragus), but it is less branched and less spiny. It is also similar to lamb's quarters (Chenopodium album), but its leaves are smaller and narrow to a point.

== Distribution ==
This plant is native to Eurasia and was first described from the Caspian Sea region. It may have spread beyond its native range as a seed contaminant, possibly of alfalfa seed. It was first recorded in North America in 1915 near Fallon, Nevada. By 1921, it was noted in the Central Valley of California, and by 1940, it was present from British Columbia to Wyoming and had established in eastern North America. The seeds are probably dispersed when the spiny dry fruits catch in animal fur and feathers, and human activity such as road maintenance may aid their spread and establishment.

== Biology ==
This plant grows easily in alkaline and saline soils. While it has been known to displace native flora at times, it is more persistent than competitive; it simply tolerates stress better than many other plants. On land with little disturbance, native plants can replace it. It generally does not have a strong negative effect on local ecosystems. Infestations are rarely severe.

Livestock will graze on the plant, but it is toxic to them, particularly to sheep, which have been known to die after just one feeding. The foliage contains potassium oxalate. It has been cited as one of the major plant species causing oxalate poisoning in ruminants.

== Control ==
Where B. hyssopifolia occurs as an introduced weed it may be controlled by several methods, including hand-pulling. It does not resprout from root bits left in the soil. Seedlings can be cut off at ground level. The plant could be controlled with herbicides, akin to kochia and Russian thistle infestations, but it has rarely required such a treatment. Fire has also been used to restore native bird nesting grounds taken over by B. hyssopifolia.
