= Coleophora magyarica =

Scientific classification
- Kingdom: Animalia
- Phylum: Arthropoda
- Clade: Pancrustacea
- Class: Insecta
- Order: Lepidoptera
- Family: Coleophoridae
- Genus: Coleophora
- Species: C. magyarica

Binomial name
- Coleophora magyarica Baldizzone, 1983

Synonyms
- Ecebalia magyarica

Species of moth

Coleophora magyarica is a moth of the family Coleophoridae. It is found in Slovakia, Hungary, Ukraine, southern Russia and central Asia. It occurs in desert and semi-desert biotopes.

Adults are on wing in August.

The larvae feed on Camphorosma monspeliaca and Kochia prostrata. They feed on the generative organs (ovaries and carpels) of their host plant.
