= Coleophora tecta =

Scientific classification
- Kingdom: Animalia
- Phylum: Arthropoda
- Class: Insecta
- Order: Lepidoptera
- Family: Coleophoridae
- Genus: Coleophora
- Species: C. tecta

Binomial name
- Coleophora tecta (Falkovitsh, 1989)

Synonyms
- Aureliania tecta Falkovitsh, 1989

Species of moth

Coleophora tecta is a moth of the family Coleophoridae. It is found in Kazakhstan.

The larvae feed on the shoot apex and the generative organs of Kochia prostrata.
