= Coleophora hungariae =

Scientific classification
- Kingdom: Animalia
- Phylum: Arthropoda
- Clade: Pancrustacea
- Class: Insecta
- Order: Lepidoptera
- Family: Coleophoridae
- Genus: Coleophora
- Species: C. hungariae

Binomial name
- Coleophora hungariae Gozmany, 1955

Synonyms
- Ecebalia eruslani Anikin, 2005

Species of moth

Coleophora hungariae is a moth of the family Coleophoridae. It is found in Austria, Bulgaria, Hungary, Romania, Slovakia and southern Russia.

Adults emerge in mid-July and are on wing to the end of August.

The larvae feed on Camphorosma species, including Camphorosma annua. They feed from within a case.

== Subspecies ==
- Coleophora hungariae hungariae (Austria, Bulgaria, Hungary, Romania, Slovakia)
- Coleophora hungariae eruslani Anikin, 2005 (southern Russia)
