= Coleophora superlonga =

Scientific classification
- Kingdom: Animalia
- Phylum: Arthropoda
- Class: Insecta
- Order: Lepidoptera
- Family: Coleophoridae
- Genus: Coleophora
- Species: C. superlonga

Binomial name
- Coleophora superlonga (Falkovitsh, 1989)

Synonyms
- Aureliania superlonga Falkovitsh, 1989; Ecebalia superlonga

Species of moth

Coleophora superlonga is a moth of the family Coleophoridae. It is found in Ukraine and southern Russia.

The larvae feed on Suaeda altissima, Suaeda microphylla, Salsola soda and Kochia prostrata. They feed on the generative organs of their host plant.
