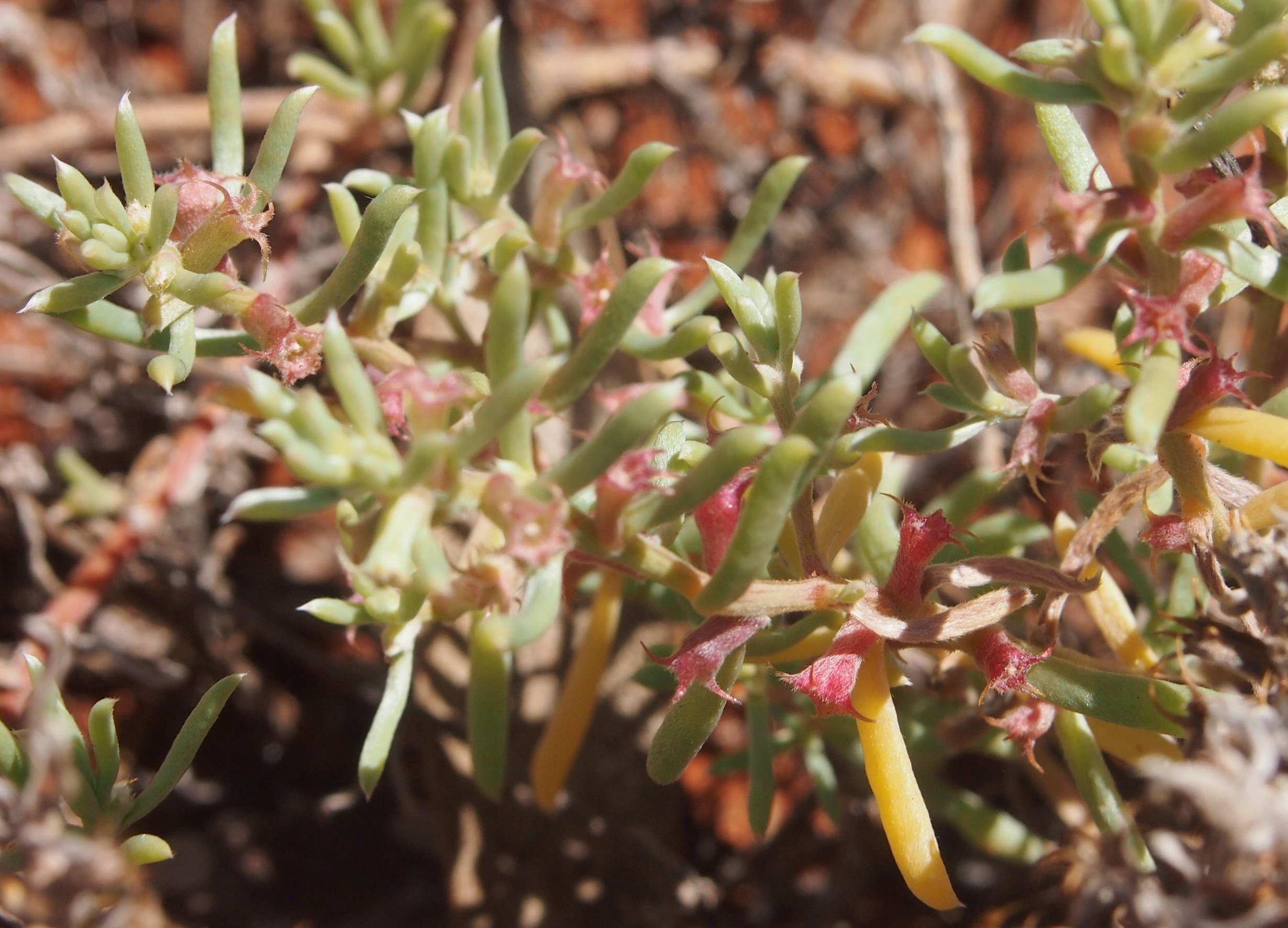
- Neobassia astrocarpa fruit

Scientific classification
- Kingdom: Plantae
- Clade: Tracheophytes
- Clade: Angiosperms
- Clade: Eudicots
- Order: Caryophyllales
- Family: Amaranthaceae
- Subfamily: Camphorosmoideae
- Tribe: Camphorosmeae
- Genus: Neobassia; A.J.Scott

= Neobassia =

Genus of flowering plant

Neobassia is a genus of small shrubs in the family Chenopodiaceae (sensu stricto), which are included in Amaranthaceae family, (sensu lato) according to the APG classification. Species are endemic to Australia.

== Description ==
Species have alternate, sessile leaves. Flowers are bisexual, solitary in the leaf axil. The perianth is 5-lobed with 5 stamens. The fruiting perianth is cylindrical, crustaceous to woody, with 5 spines arising from the base of the lobes, which distinguishes it from Sclerolaena. Pericarp membranous, seed vertical, testa membranous, embryo U-shaped, with an erect radicle, perisperm central.

== Species ==
Species include, according to Kew;

- Neobassia astrocarpa (F. Muell.) A.J. Scott
- Neobassia proceriflora (F. Muell.) A.J. Scott

== Taxonomy ==
The genus name of Neobassia is in honour of Ferdinando Bassi (1710–1774), Italian botanist. It was first described and published in Feddes Repert. Vol.89 on page 117 in 1978.
