= Wilhelm Daniel Joseph Koch =

German physician and botanist (1771–1849)

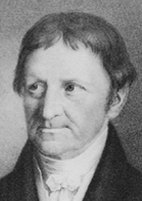
Wilhelm Daniel Joseph Koch

Wilhelm Daniel Joseph Koch (5 March 1771 – 14 November 1849) was a German medical doctor and botanist from Kusel, which at various points in his life was under the Holy Roman Empire, part of France and then part of the Kingdom of Bavaria.

== Education ==
Koch studied medicine at the Universities of Jena and Marburg, and afterwards was a Stadtphysicus (state physician) in Trarbach. He then took the same position at Kaiserslautern in 1798, which would come under French control and then move to Bavarian control as did his home city. In 1824 he became a professor of medicine and botany at the University of Erlangen, where he stayed for the remainder of his life. At Erlangen, he was also director of the botanical gardens. In 1833, he was elected a foreign member of the Royal Swedish Academy of Sciences.

== Death ==
Two years before he died, Kock suffered a fracture in his femoral neck after a fall. Although it confined him to his bed, he refused to let it interfere with his teaching and had his pupils come to his room, even inventing a device to draw plant forms on his blackboard from a distance. Nevertheless, his health slowly declined, and he died at Erlangen in 1849, aged 78.

== Notable works ==
Among his better written efforts was a synopsis on German and Swiss flora titled Synopsis florae germanicae et helveticae (1835–37). Another noteworthy publication of his was Catalogus plantarum, quae in ditione Florae Palatinatus (Catalog of Palatinate flora) (1814).

== Honours ==
He has been honoured in the naming of 2 plant genera; Eokochia (from the family Amaranthaceae), and Kochia (Chenopodioideae).
