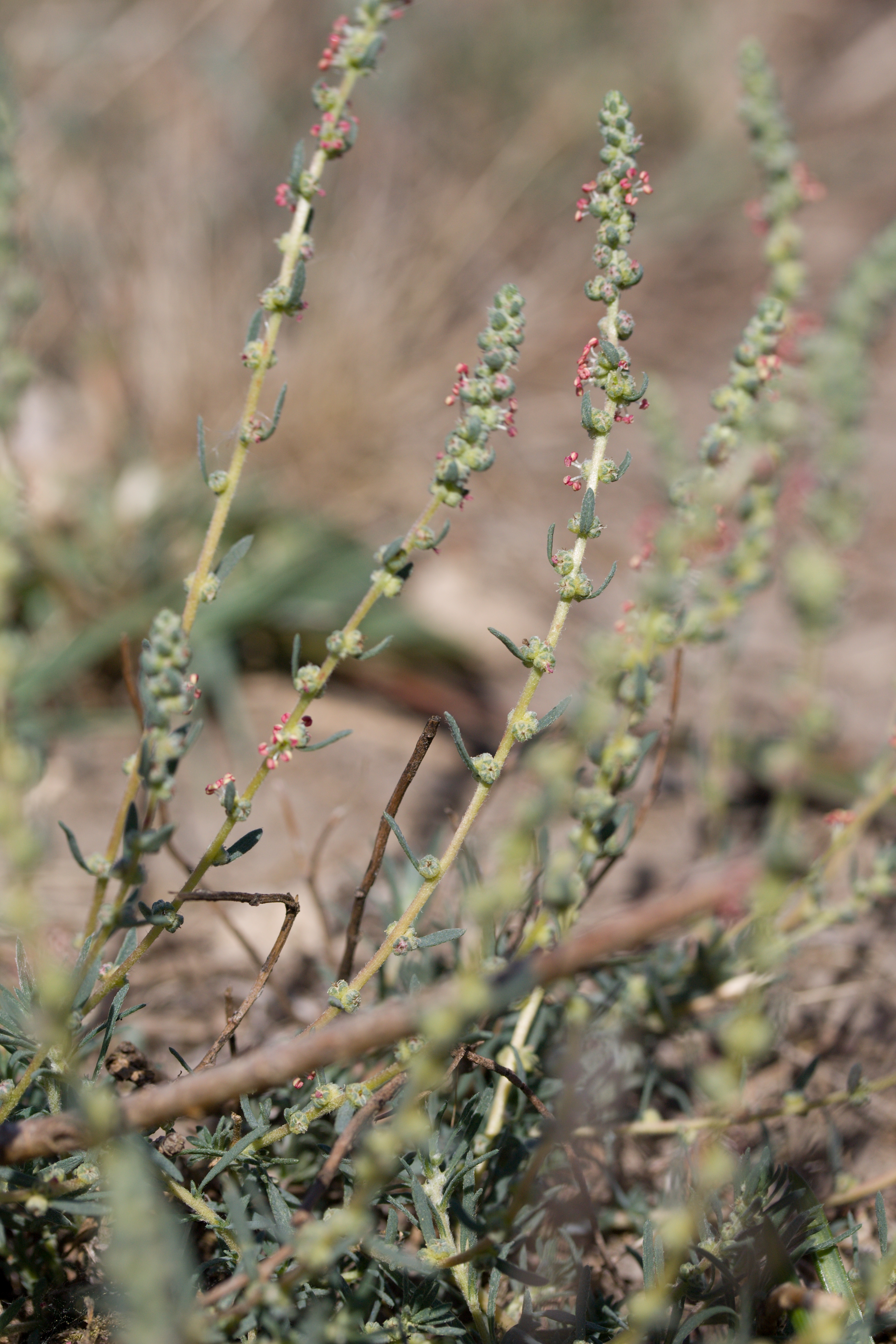
- Camphorosma annua

Scientific classification
- Kingdom: Plantae
- Clade: Embryophytes
- Clade: Tracheophytes
- Clade: Spermatophytes
- Clade: Angiosperms
- Clade: Eudicots
- Order: Caryophyllales
- Family: Amaranthaceae
- Subfamily: Camphorosmoideae
- Tribe: Camphorosmeae
- Genus: Camphorosma; L.

Species
- See text

Synonyms
- Camphorata Zinn

= Camphorosma =

Genus of flowering plants

Camphorosma is a genus of flowering plants in the family Amaranthaceae, found in northern Africa, southern and eastern Europe, Crimea, Russia, Anatolia, the Caucasus, Iran, Afghanistan, Pakistan, Central Asia, the Altai, western Siberia, Xinjiang in China, and Mongolia. Annuals or subshrubs, they can be distinguished from closely related taxa such as Bassia by their flattened perianths which have four lobes, inflorescences with multicellular glandular hairs, a distinct C_{4} leaf anatomy type (called the Camphorosma type), and a chromosome count of 2n = 12.

== Species ==
Currently accepted species include:

- Camphorosma annua Pall.
- Camphorosma monspeliaca L.
- Camphorosma persepolitana Gand.
- Camphorosma polygama Bunge ex Boiss.
- Camphorosma songorica Bunge
