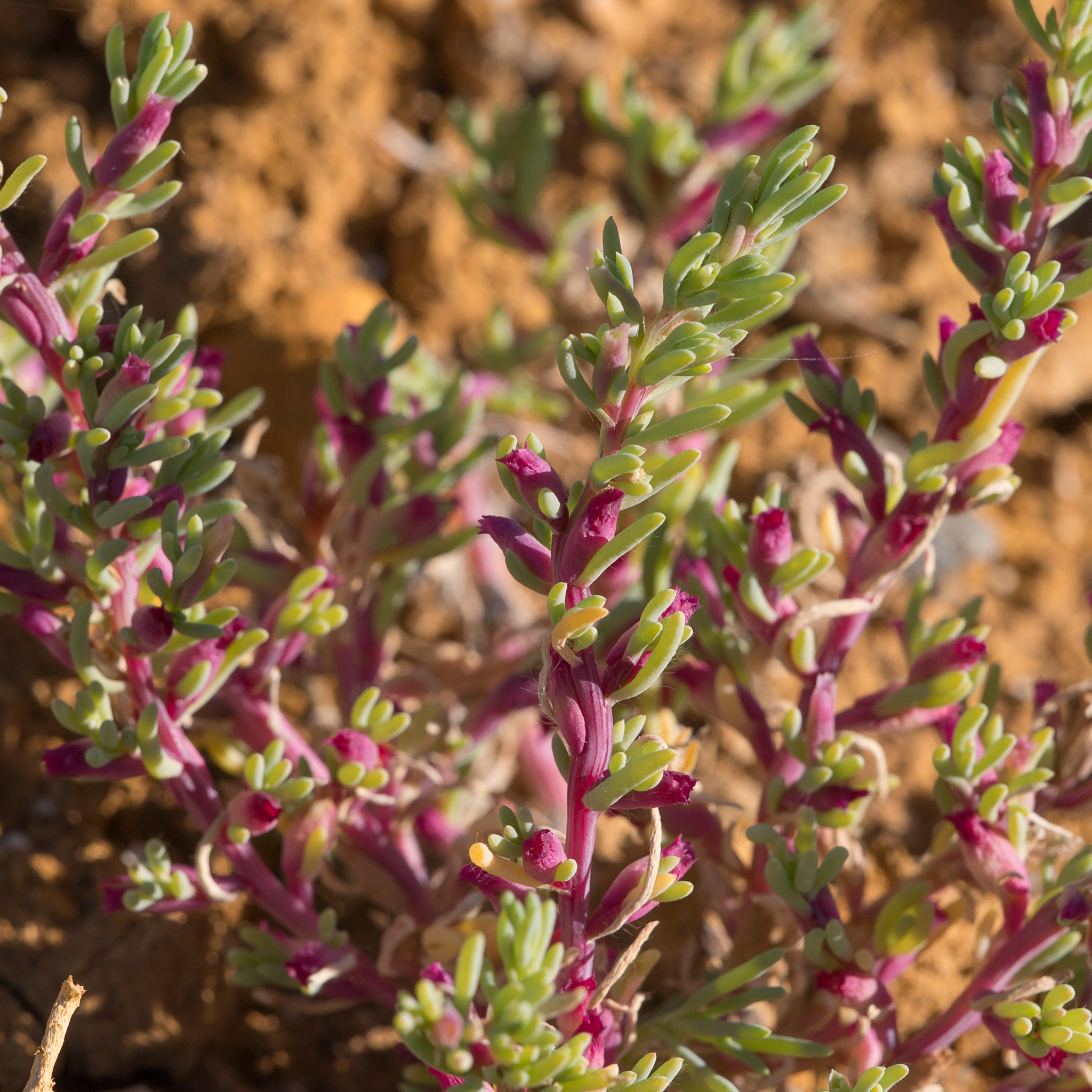

Scientific classification
- Kingdom: Plantae
- Clade: Tracheophytes
- Clade: Angiosperms
- Clade: Eudicots
- Order: Caryophyllales
- Family: Amaranthaceae
- Genus: Neobassia
- Species: N. proceriflora

Binomial name
- Neobassia proceriflora (F.Muell.) A.J.Scott

Synonyms
- Threlkeldia proceriflora F.Muell.

= Neobassia proceriflora =

Species of plant in the amaranth family

Neobassia proceriflora, the soda bush, is a species of flowering plant in the family Amaranthaceae, native to central and eastern Australia. A small shrub, it is typically found growing in heavy soils.
