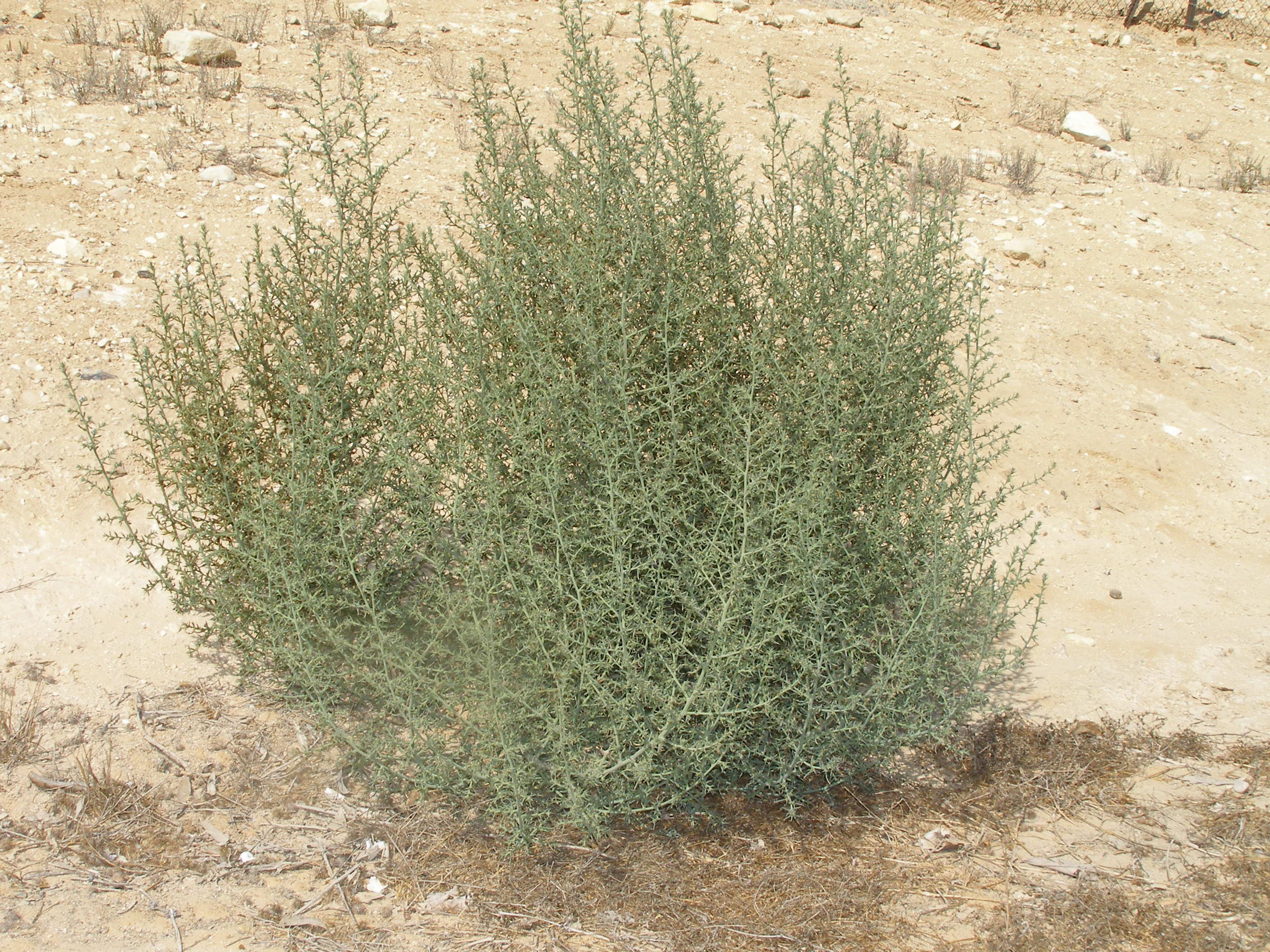
- Bassia indica

Scientific classification
- Kingdom: Plantae
- Clade: Tracheophytes
- Clade: Angiosperms
- Clade: Eudicots
- Order: Caryophyllales
- Family: Amaranthaceae
- Subfamily: Camphorosmoideae
- Tribe: Camphorosmeae
- Genus: Bassia; All.

Species
- See text

Synonyms
- Chenoleioides (Ulbr.) Botsch. Kirilowia Bunge; Kochia Roth; Londesia Fisch. & C.A. Mey. Panderia Fisch. & C.A. Mey.

= Bassia =

Genus of flowering plants

Bassia is a genus of flowering plants in the family Amaranthaceae. They are distributed in the western Mediterranean to eastern Asia. Some occur outside their native ranges as introduced species.

== Description ==
The species of genus Bassia are annuals or perennial subshrubs. Their leaves are variable. The flowers are normally inconspicuous, in spike-like inflorescences without bracteoles. The fruits are achenes. The seed contains an annular, horseshoe-shaped or folded embryo that surrounds the perisperm. The fruiting perianth remains either unappendaged or develops 5 wings. The wings are spiny in Bassia hyssopifolia.

According to its most recent description, the genus is defined by its three types of C_{4} "kochioid" leaf anatomy. Many other characters cannot be used to differentiate species from one another, because they are variable among individuals within the species.

== Habitat ==
The genus mainly occurs in steppe and desert ecosystems. Some species can be found in ruderal sites and salt marshes up to subalpine altitudes. Phylogenetical research suggests that the genus evolved in the Miocene.

== Uses ==
Some palatable species of Bassia with high protein content are valuable components of rangelands, sometimes seeded for the melioration of overgrazed rangelands.

== Systematics ==
The genus name Bassia was first published in 1766 by Carlo Allioni, with the type species Bassia muricata L. (under the name B. aegyptiaca). The genus belongs to the subfamily Camphorosmoideae of the Amaranthaceae.

As of 2011, after its most recent reorganization, it contains about 20 species.

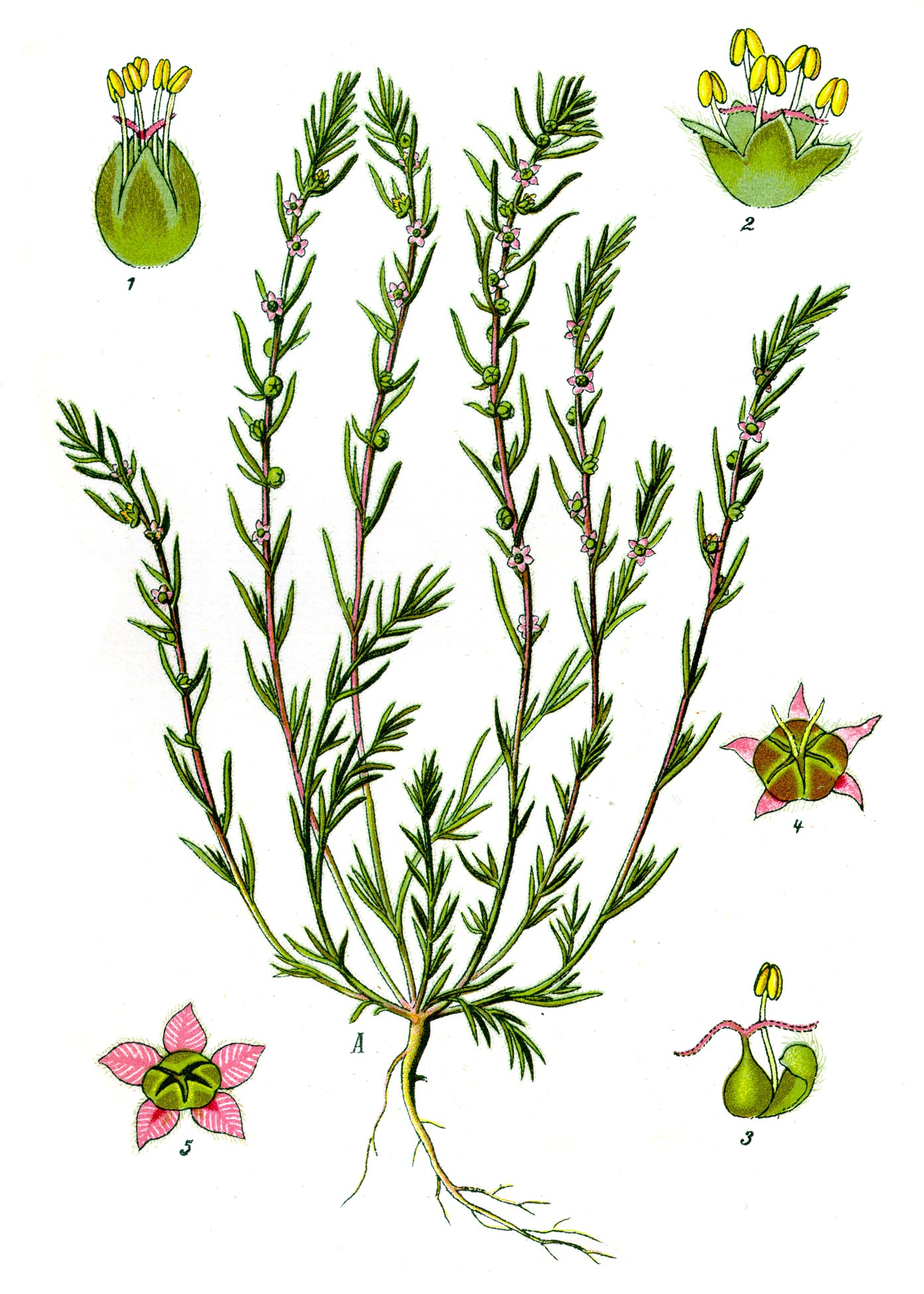
Bassia laniflora

Species include:

- Bassia angustifolia (Turcz.) Freitag & G.Kadereit
- Bassia arabica (Boiss.) Maire & Weiller
- Bassia dinteri (Botsch.) A.J.Scott
- Bassia eriophora (Schrad.) Asch.
- Bassia hyssopifolia (Pall.) Kuntze – fivehorn smotherweed
- Bassia indica (Wight) A.J.Scott
- Bassia laniflora (S.G.Gmel.) A.J.Scott
- Bassia lasiantha Freitag & G.Kadereit
- Bassia littorea (Makino) Freitag & G.Kadereit
- Bassia muricata (L.) Asch.
- Bassia odontoptera (Schrenk) Freitag & G.Kadereit
- Bassia pilosa (Fisch. & C.A.Mey.) Freitag & G.Kadereit
- Bassia prostrata (L.) A.J.Scott – forage kochia, prostrate summer-cypress
- Bassia salsoloides (Fenzl) A.J.Scott
- Bassia scoparia (L.) A.J.Scott – burningbush, belvedere, kochia, Mexican fireweed, Mexican firebrush
- Bassia stellaris (Moq.) Bornm.
- Bassia tianschanica (Pavlov) Freitag & G.Kadereit
- Bassia tomentosa (Lowe) Maire & Weiller
- Bassia villosissima (Bong. & C.A.Mey.) Freitag & G.Kadereit

Several other species formerly classified in Bassia are now treated in new genera in the subfamily Camphorosmoideae, some of them monotypic. B. hirsuta is now the only member of genus Spirobassia, and B. sedoides is the monotypic Sedobassia. B. dasyphylla is part of Grubovia. Bassia saxicola is now Eokochia saxicola.
