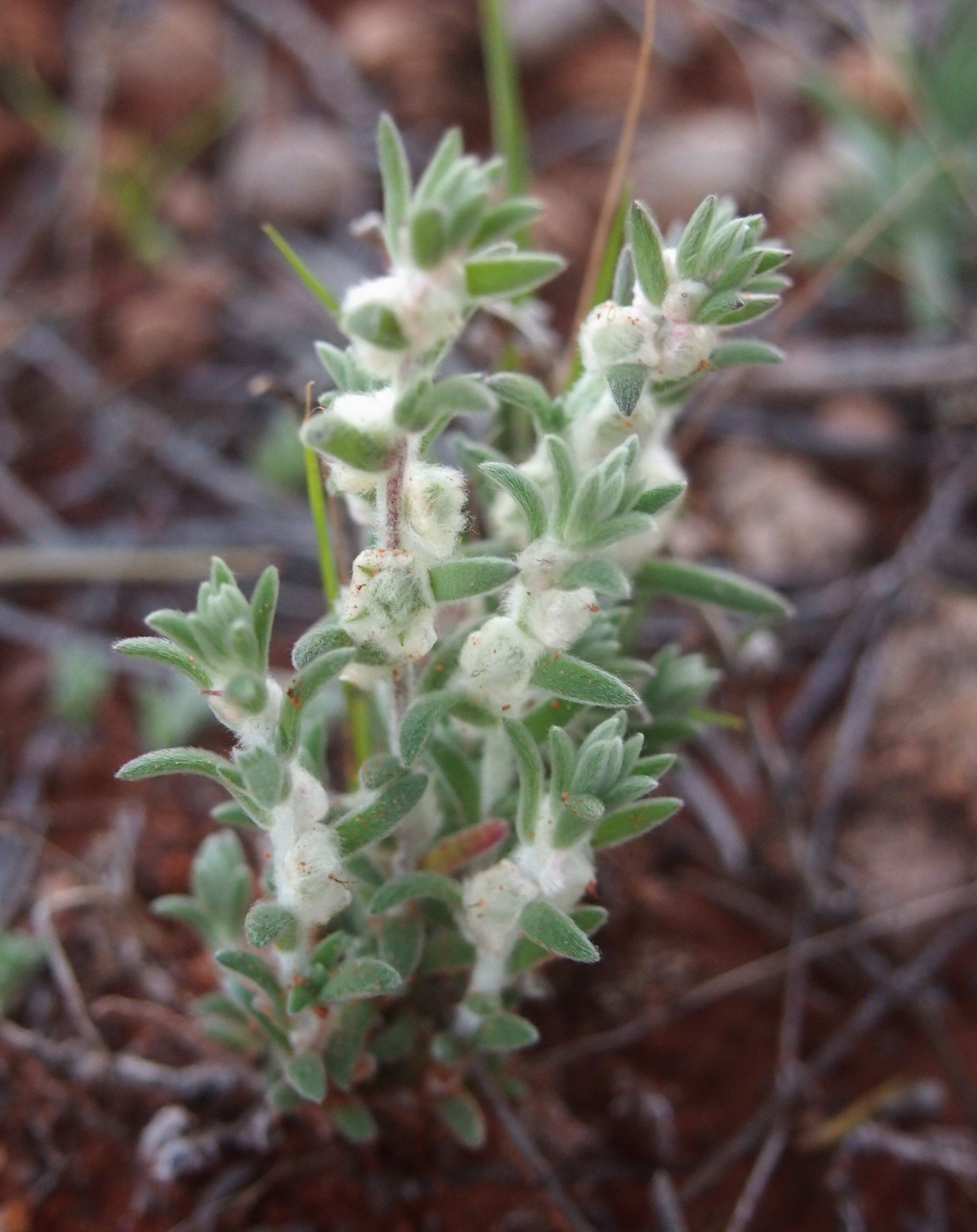

Scientific classification
- Kingdom: Plantae
- Clade: Tracheophytes
- Clade: Angiosperms
- Clade: Eudicots
- Order: Caryophyllales
- Family: Amaranthaceae
- Tribe: Camphorosmeae
- Genus: Eriochiton (R.H.Anderson) A.J.Scott (1978)
- Species: E. sclerolaenoides

Binomial name
- Eriochiton sclerolaenoides (F.Muell.) F.Muell. ex A.J.Scott (1978)

Synonyms
- Austrobassia sclerolaenoides (F.Muell.) Ulbr. (1934); Bassia eriochiton Tate (1890); Bassia sclerolaenoides (F.Muell.) F.Muell. (1882); Chenolea sclerolaenoides F.Muell. ex Benth. (1870); Echinopsilon sclerolaenoides F.Muell. (1858) (basionym); Maireana sclerolaenoides (F.Muell.) Paul G.Wilson (1975)

= Eriochiton =

Genus of plants

Eriochiton is a genus of small shrubs in the family Chenopodiaceae (sensu stricto), which are included in Amaranthaceae (sensu lato) according to the APG classification. It contains a single species, Eriochiton sclerolaenoides, a subshrub endemic to Australia.

== Description ==
Species have woolly branches. The leaves are linear, silky-woolly. Flowers are solitary in the axils, the perianth is 5-lobed. Fruiting perianth hardened, silky-woolly, with 5 spines and 5 erect wings arising from the base of the lobes. Seeds horizontal.
