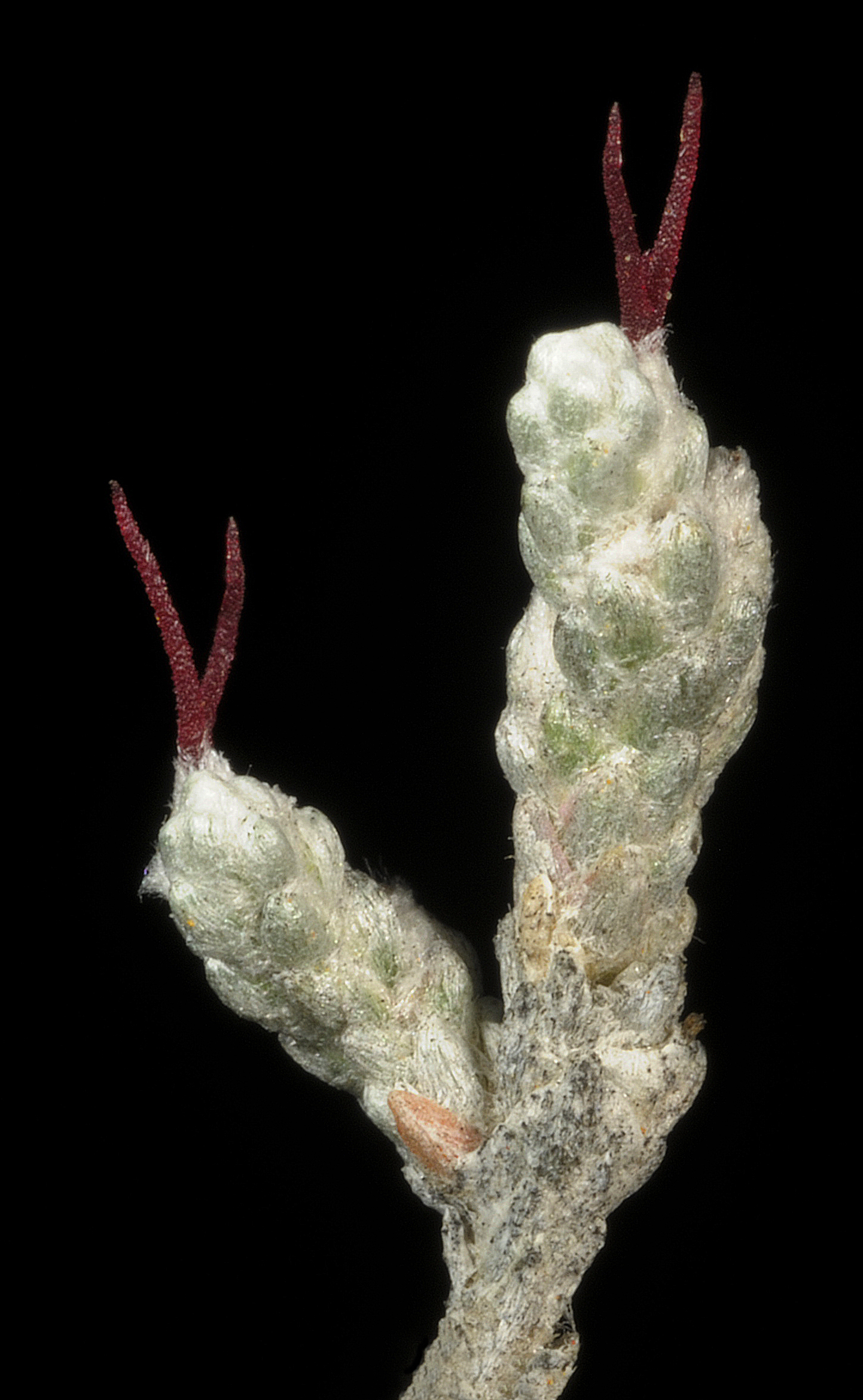

Conservation status
- Declared rare (DEC)

- Endangered (EPBC Act)

Scientific classification
- Kingdom: Plantae
- Clade: Tracheophytes
- Clade: Angiosperms
- Clade: Eudicots
- Order: Caryophyllales
- Family: Amaranthaceae
- Genus: Roycea
- Species: R. pycnophylloides

Binomial name
- Roycea pycnophylloides C.A.Gardner

= Roycea pycnophylloides =

Species of shrub

Roycea pycnophylloides, commonly known as Saltmat, is a species of shrub endemic to Western Australia. It has no synonyms.

== Description ==
Roycea pycnophylloides is a perennial, dioecious herb which forms silvery, densely branched, mats of up to 1 m in diameter. The branchlets are closely woolly and obscured by the alternate, imbricate, fleshy leaves which are about 2 mm long by 1 mm wide and silky when young. The male flowers are cup-shaped with thin, ovate tepals which are about 1 mm long and silky outside. The anthers are exserted, and the pistillode is pubescent. The female flowers are about 1 mm long, have no staminodes absent, and the stigmas are exserted and long (about 4 mm). The fruit is broadly ovoid (about. 2 mm high) and is surrounded at the base by a persistent perianth.

== Distribution and habitat ==
It is found near the Mortlock River near Meckering in southern Western Australia, growing on the saline sandy flats around the river.
