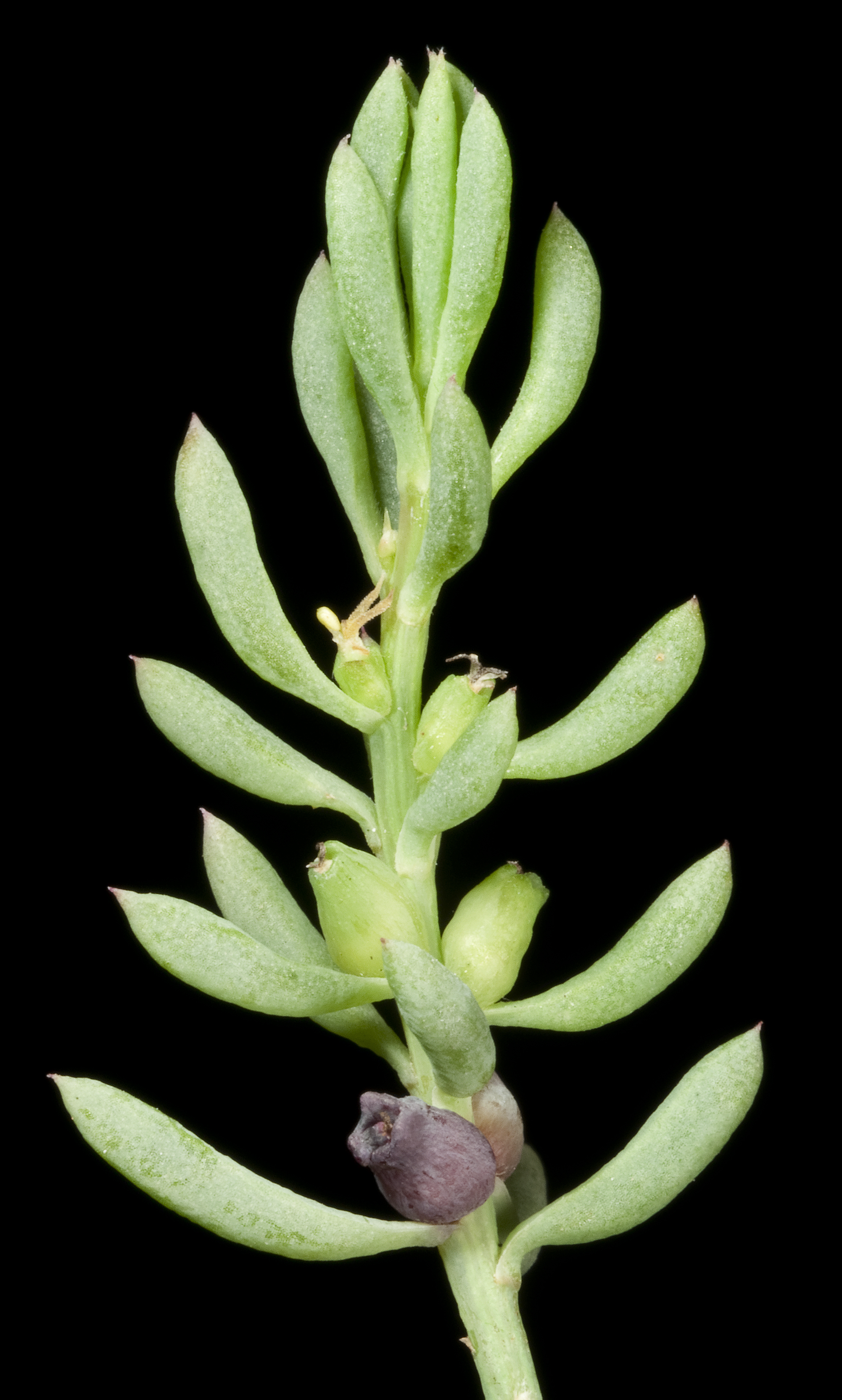
- Threlkeldia diffusa

Scientific classification
- Kingdom: Plantae
- Clade: Tracheophytes
- Clade: Angiosperms
- Clade: Eudicots
- Order: Caryophyllales
- Family: Amaranthaceae
- Subfamily: Camphorosmoideae
- Tribe: Camphorosmeae
- Genus: Threlkeldia; R.Br.

Species
- See text

= Threlkeldia =

Genus of flowering plants

Threlkeldia is a genus of annuals or short-lived perennials in the family Amaranthaceae. There are two species, both of which are endemic to Australia. Together they occur in all Australian states except Queensland.

- Threlkeldia inchoata (J.M.Black) J.M.Black, which occurs in New South Wales and South Australia.
- Threlkeldia diffusa, known as coast bonefruit
