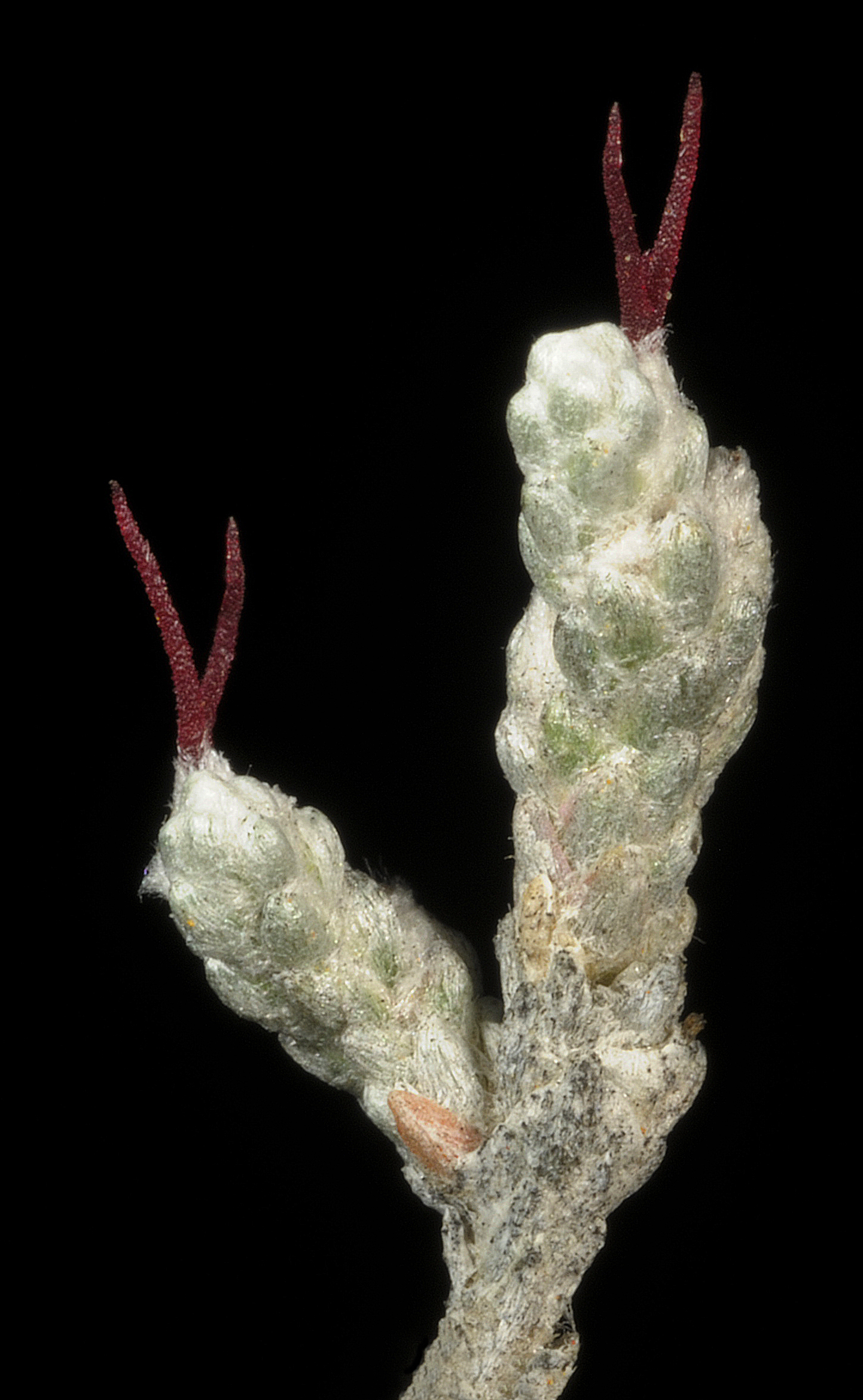
- Roycea pycnophylloides

Scientific classification
- Kingdom: Plantae
- Clade: Tracheophytes
- Clade: Angiosperms
- Clade: Eudicots
- Order: Caryophyllales
- Family: Amaranthaceae
- Subfamily: Camphorosmoideae
- Tribe: Camphorosmeae
- Genus: Roycea; C.A.Gardner

Species
- See text

= Roycea =

Genus of flowering plants

Roycea is a genus of plants formerly in the family Chenopodiaceae, and now in the Amaranthaceae. The genus was first described in 1948 by Charles Austin Gardner, and the genus name honours Robert Dunlop Royce (a helper at the Perth Herbarium). The entire genus is endemic to Western Australia. There are no synonyms.

== Species ==
(listed by both Plants of the World online, and FloraBase.)

- Roycea divaricata Paul G.Wilson
- Roycea pycnophylloides C.A.Gardner
- Roycea spinescens C.A.Gardner
