= Weiller =

Weiller is a surname. Notable people with the surname include:

- Jane Weiller (1912–1989), American golfer
- Lazare Weiller (1858–1928), French engineer, industrialist, and politician
- Paul-Louis Weiller (1893–1993), French industrialist and philanthropist
