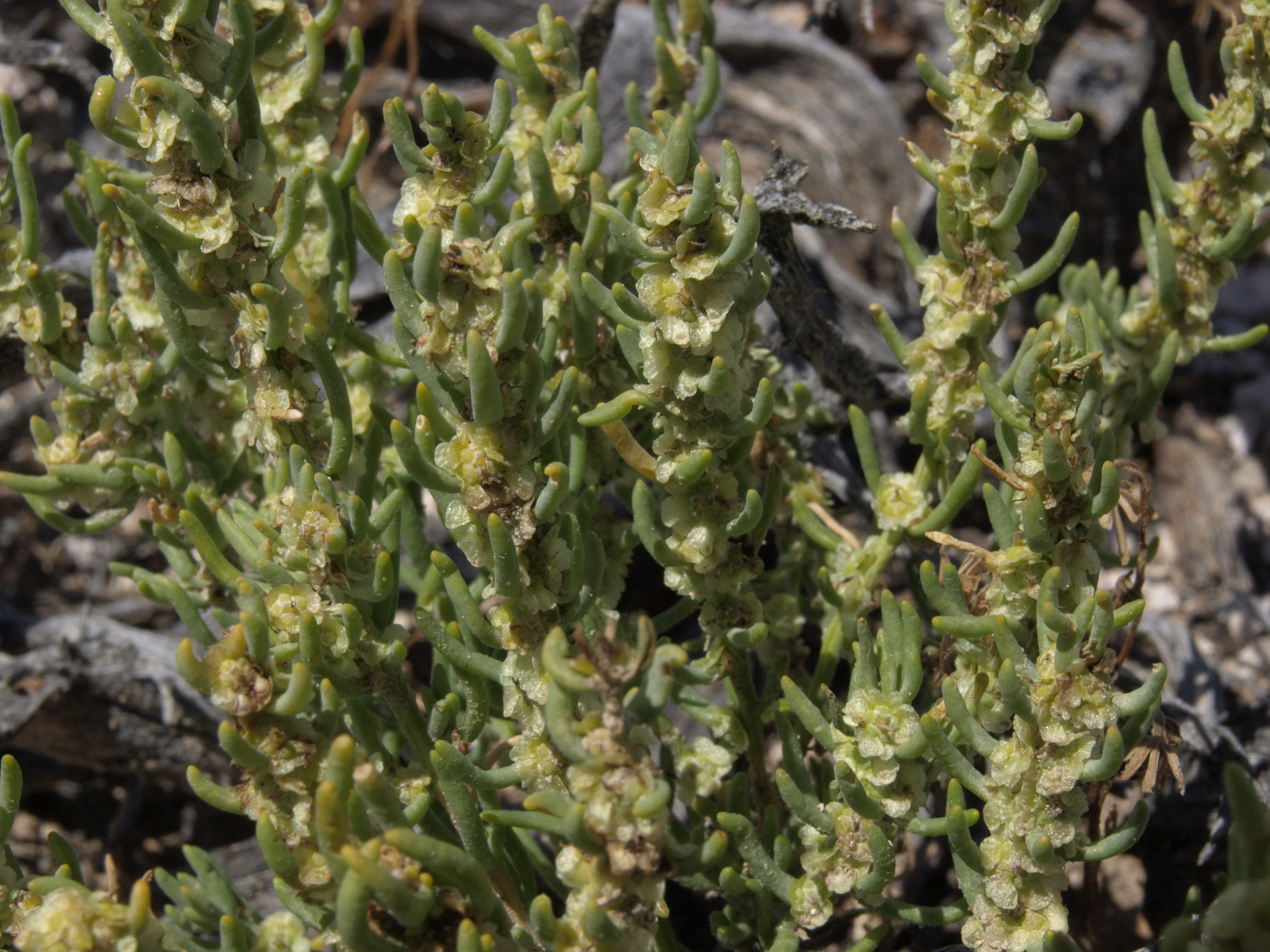

Scientific classification
- Kingdom: Plantae
- Clade: Tracheophytes
- Clade: Angiosperms
- Clade: Eudicots
- Order: Caryophyllales
- Family: Amaranthaceae
- Genus: Neokochia
- Species: N. americana

Binomial name
- Neokochia americana (S.Wats.) G.L.Chu & S.C.Sand.

= Neokochia americana =

Species of flowering plant

Neokochia americana (syn. Bassia americana, Kochia americana) is a species of flowering plant in the amaranth family, subfamily Camphorosmoideae, known by the common name green molly.

== Description ==
Neokochia americana is a squat dwarf shrub growing many sprawling, mostly unbranched stems to a maximum height near 40 centimeters. The stems are covered in small, fleshy, knobby leaves less than 2 centimeters long. The stems and foliage are sometimes slightly hairy. Leaf anatomy is of the "C3 Neokochia americana type" with a thick-walled aqueous tissue. White-woolly flowers appear singly or in small clusters. The fruiting perianth is 5-winged.

== Distribution ==
Neokochia americana is native to the western United States from California to Montana to Texas, where it grows in dry, alkaline soils such as alkali flats and desert washes. A closely related species is Neokochia californica.
