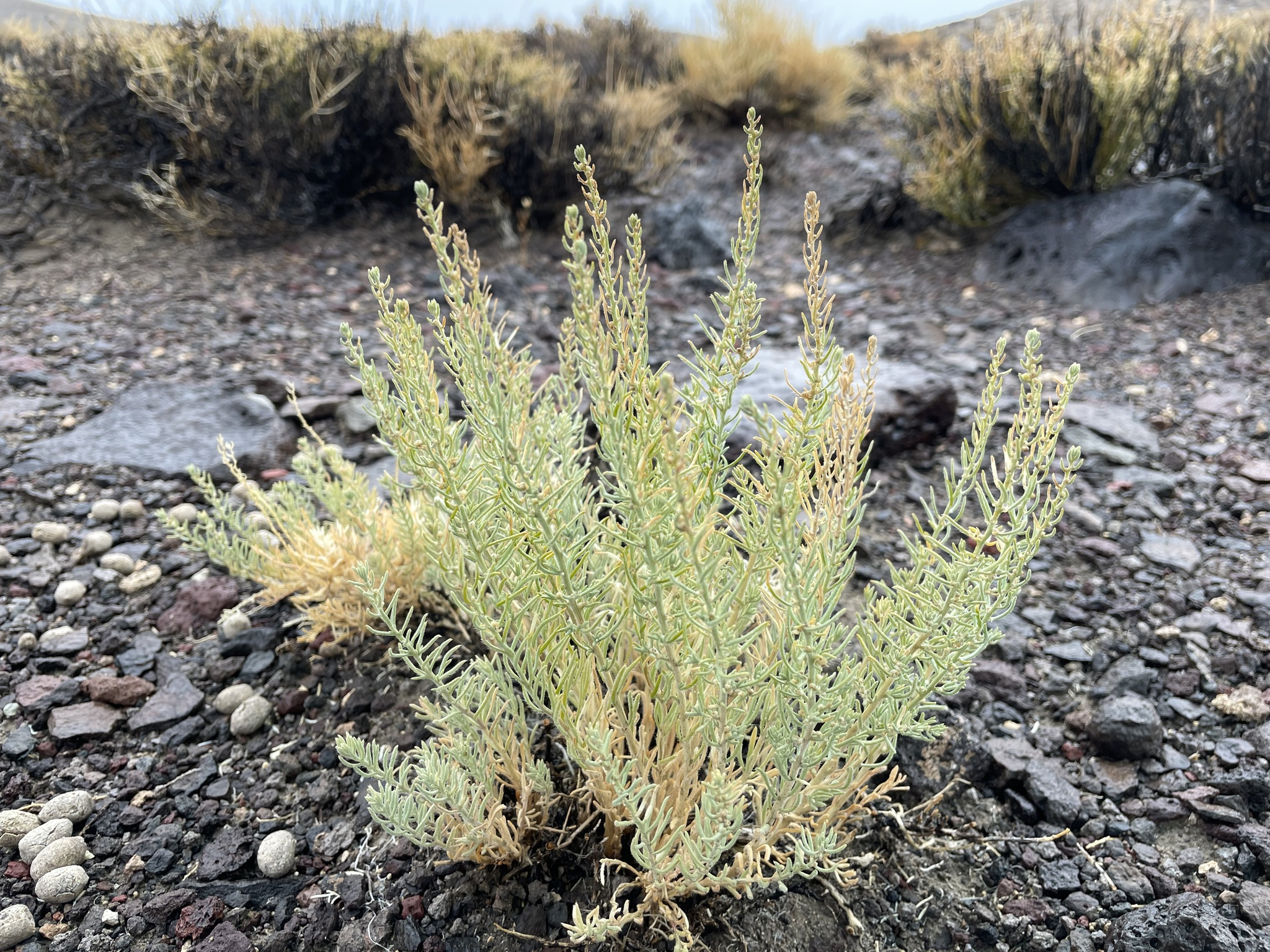
- Neokochia americana

Scientific classification
- Kingdom: Plantae
- Clade: Tracheophytes
- Clade: Angiosperms
- Clade: Eudicots
- Order: Caryophyllales
- Family: Amaranthaceae
- Subfamily: Camphorosmoideae
- Tribe: Camphorosmeae
- Genus: Neokochia (Ulbr.) G.L.Ch & S.C.Sand.

= Neokochia =

Genus of flowering plant

Neokochia is a genus of flowering plants belonging to the family Amaranthaceae.

Its native range is Western and Central USA. It is found in the states of Arizona, California, Colorado, Idaho, Montana, Nevada, New Mexico, Oregon, Texas, Utah and Wyoming.

The genus name of Neokochia is in honour of Wilhelm Daniel Joseph Koch (1771–1849), a German doctor and botanist. He was also professor of medicine and botany in Erlangen, and botanical garden director. It was first described and published in Madroño Vol.55 on page 255 (written in 2008, published in 2009).

== Known species ==
According to Kew:

- Neokochia americana (S.Watson) G.L.Chu & S.C.Sand.
- Neokochia californica (S.Watson) G.L.Chu & S.C.Sand.
