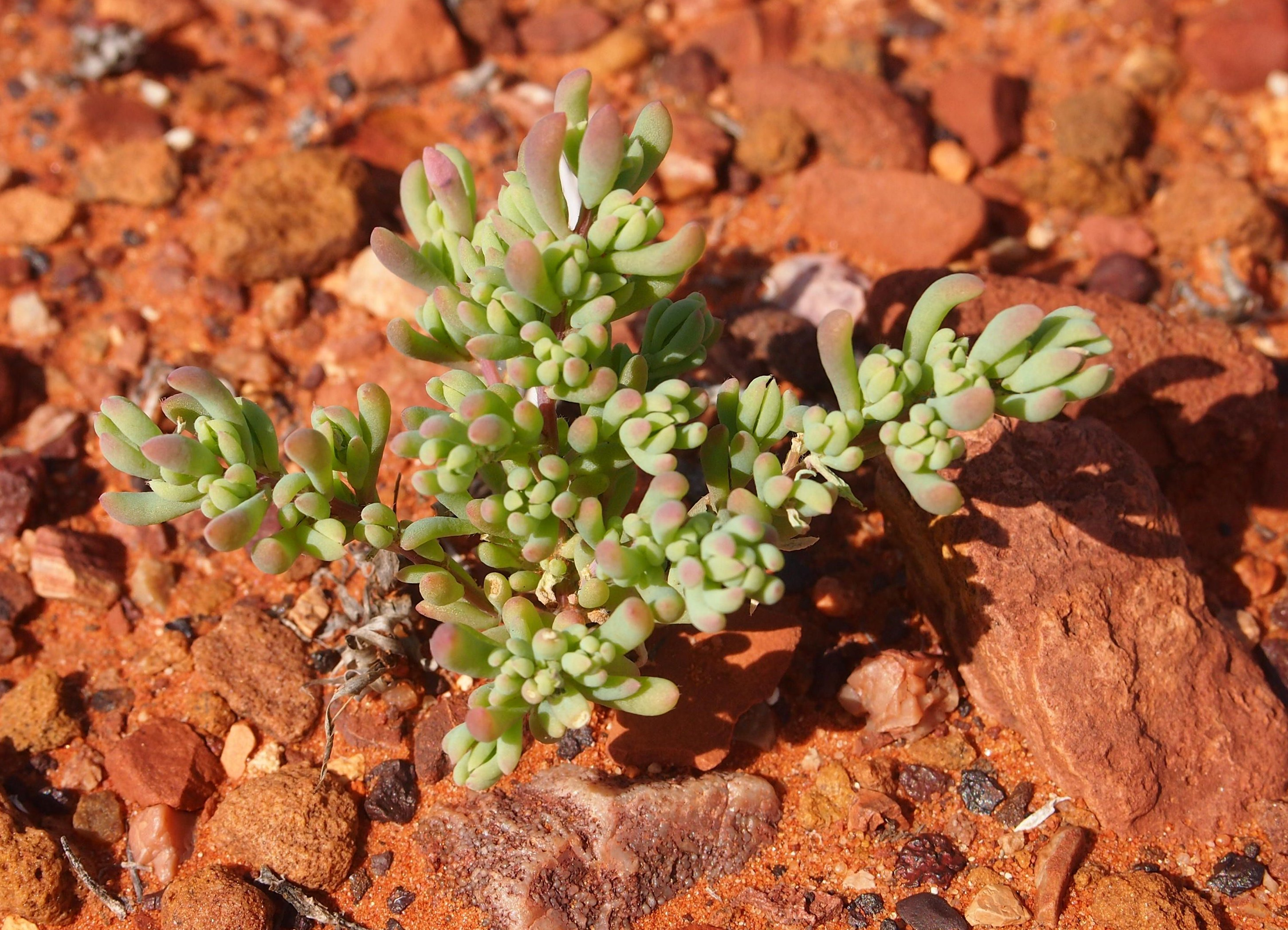

Scientific classification
- Kingdom: Plantae
- Clade: Tracheophytes
- Clade: Angiosperms
- Clade: Eudicots
- Order: Caryophyllales
- Family: Amaranthaceae
- Genus: Osteocarpum; F.Muell.

= Osteocarpum =

Genus of plants

Osteocarpum is a genus of flowering plants belonging to the family Amaranthaceae.

Its native range is Australia.

== Species ==
Species:

- Osteocarpum acropterum (F.Muell. & Tate) Volkens
- Osteocarpum dipterocarpum (F.Muell.) Volkens
- Osteocarpum pentapterum (F.Muell. & Tate) Volkens
- Osteocarpum salsuginosum F.Muell.
- Osteocarpum scleropterum (F.Muell.) Volkens
