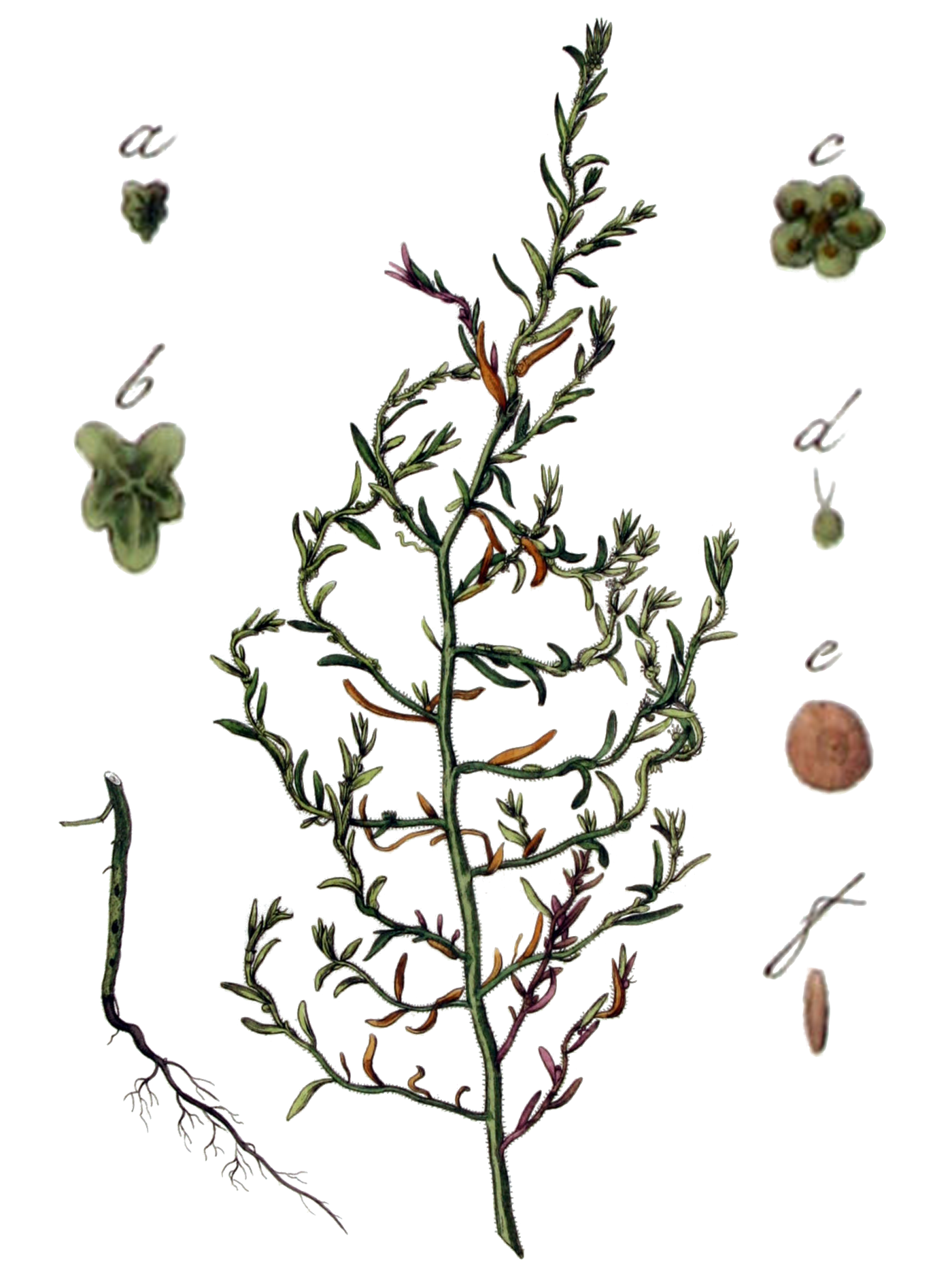

Scientific classification
- Kingdom: Plantae
- Clade: Tracheophytes
- Clade: Angiosperms
- Clade: Eudicots
- Order: Caryophyllales
- Family: Amaranthaceae
- Subfamily: Camphorosmoideae
- Tribe: Camphorosmeae
- Genus: Spirobassia; Freitag & G.Kadereit (2011)
- Species: S. hirsuta

Binomial name
- Spirobassia hirsuta (L.) Freitag & G.Kadereit (2011)

Synonyms
- Synonymy: Bassia crassifolia (Pall.) Soldano (1993); Bassia hirsuta (L.) Asch. (1867), nom. illeg.; Chenolea hirsuta (L.) Arcang. (1880); Chenopodium hirsutum L. (1753) (basionym); Chenopodium pallasianum Schult. (1820); Chenopodium tripteris Dumort. (1827), nom. superfl.; Echinopsilon crassifolius (Pall.) Moq. (1849); Echinopsilon hirsutus (L.) Moq. (1834); Kochia hirsuta (L.) Nolte (1826); Kochia tripteris Dumort. (1827); Salsola hirsuta (L.) L. (1762); Schoberia obtusifolia Bunge (1852); Schoberia pallasiana (Schult.) C.A.Mey. (1829); Suaeda albida Pall. (1803); Suaeda corniculata var. drepanophylla Litv. (1908); Suaeda crassifolia Pall. (1803); Suaeda drepanophylla (Litv.) Korovin ex Pavlov (1934); Suaeda hirsuta (L.) Rchb. (1832); Suaeda obtusifolia (Bunge) Trautv. (1867); Suaeda pallasiana (Schult.) Heynh. (1847), nom. superfl.; Willemetia hirsuta (L.) Moq. (1834)

= Spirobassia =

Genus of plants

Spirobassia hirsuta is a species of flowering plant in the amaranth family, Amaranthaceae. It is the sole species in genus Spirobassia. It is an annual plant native to temperate Eurasia, ranging from Spain to Germany and Italy, and from Greece to Ukraine, the Caucasus, western Siberia, Central Asia, Xinjiang, and Iran.
