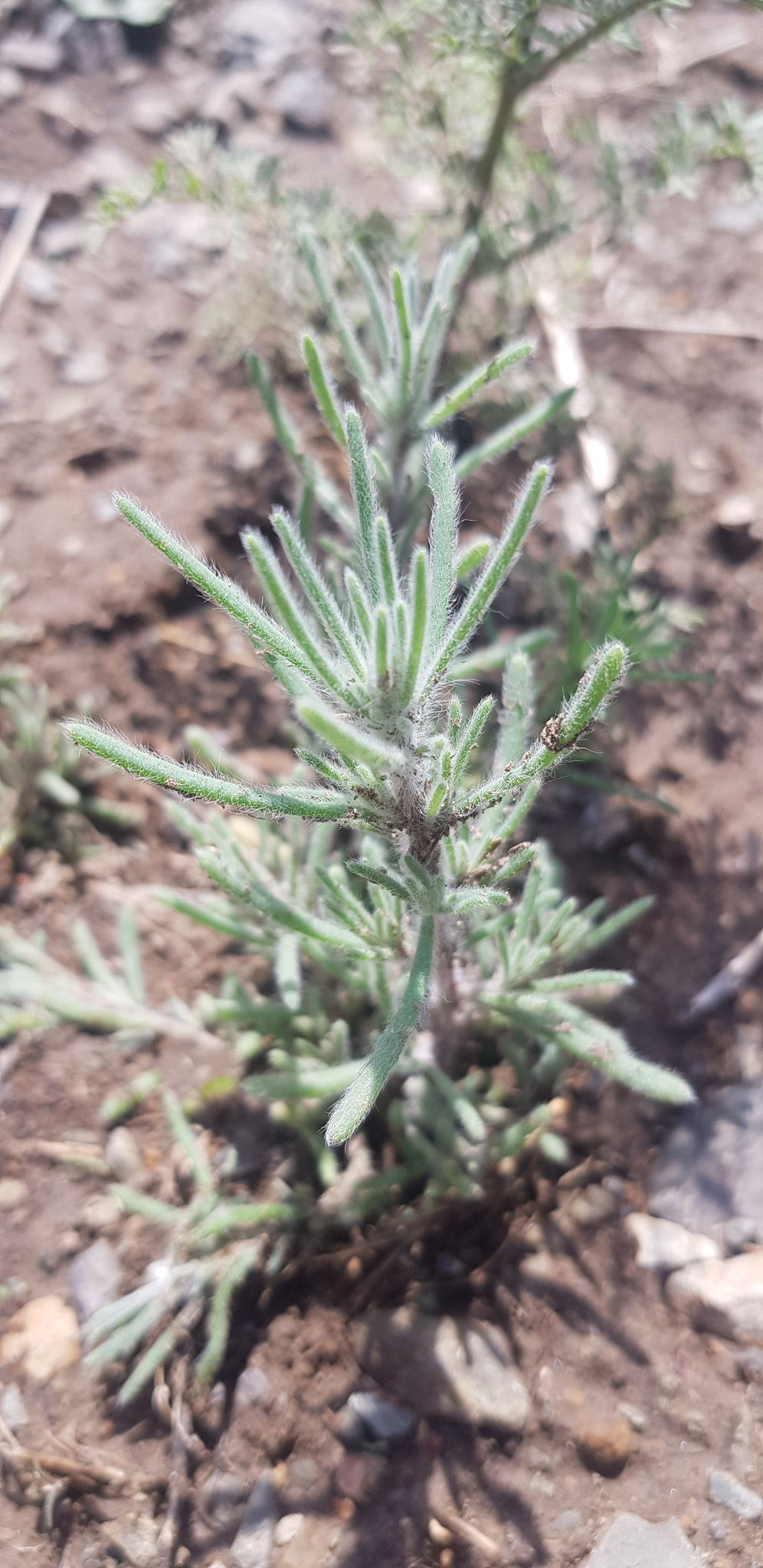
- Grubovia dasyphylla

Scientific classification
- Kingdom: Plantae
- Clade: Tracheophytes
- Clade: Angiosperms
- Clade: Eudicots
- Order: Caryophyllales
- Family: Amaranthaceae
- Genus: Grubovia; Freitag & G.Kadereit

Synonyms
- Sedobassia Freitag & G.Kadereit

= Grubovia =

Genus of plants

Grubovia is a genus of flowering plants belonging to the family Amaranthaceae.

It is native to Hungary, Romania, Yugoslavia, Kazakhstan, Kyrgyzstan, Tajikistan, Turkmenistan, West Siberia, Mongolia, Tibet and parts of China (Manchuria, Inner Mongolia, Qinghai and Xinjiang).

It has been introduced into Czechoslovakia.

The genus name of Grubovia is in honour of Valeri Grúbov (1917–2009), a Russian botanist with a focus on central Asia. It was first described and published in Taxon Vol.60 on page 72 in 2011.

Known species, according to Kew:

- Grubovia brevidentata G.L.Chu
- Grubovia dasyphylla (Fisch. & C.A.Mey.) Freitag & G.Kadereit
- Grubovia krylowii (Litv.) Freitag & G.Kadereit
- Grubovia melanoptera (Bunge) Freitag & G.Kadereit
- Grubovia mucronata G.L.Chu
- Grubovia sedoides (Pall.) G.L.Chu
