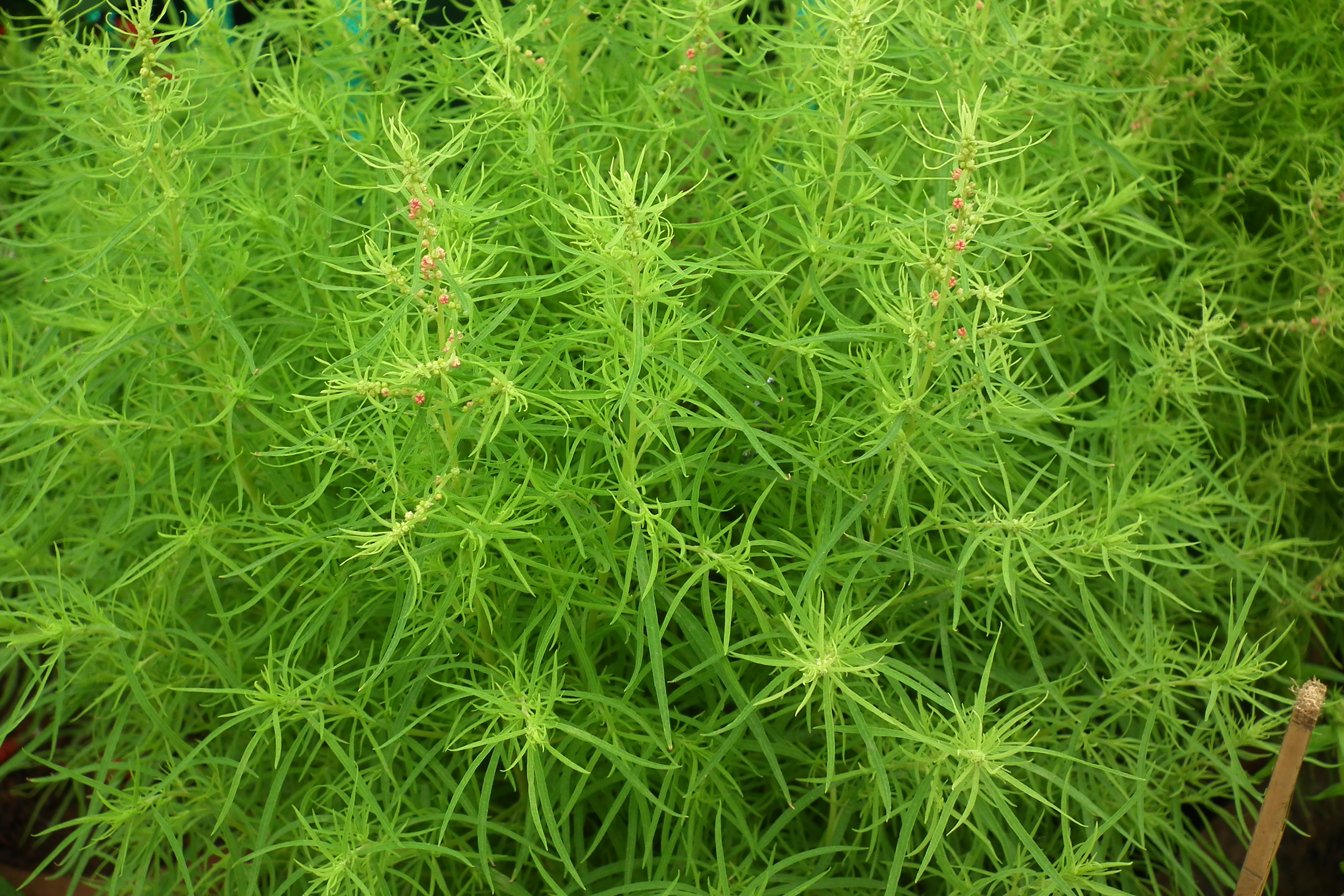

Scientific classification
- Kingdom: Plantae
- Clade: Tracheophytes
- Clade: Angiosperms
- Clade: Eudicots
- Order: Caryophyllales
- Family: Amaranthaceae
- Genus: Bassia
- Species: B. scoparia

Binomial name
- Bassia scoparia (L.) A.J.Scott

Synonyms
- Kochia scoparia (L.) Schrad.

= Bassia scoparia =

Species of flowering plant

Bassia scoparia is a large annual herb in the family Amaranthaceae (sensu lato) native to Eurasia. It has been introduced to many parts of North America, where it is found in grassland, prairie, and desert shrub ecosystems. Its common names include summer cypress, mock-cypress, kochia, belvedere, World's Fair plant, burningbush, Mexican firebrush, and Mexican fireweed, with the latter three names referring to the herb's red autumn foliage.

== Description ==
The fruit of Bassia scoparia with the calyx attached is dull brown, but when hulled, it reveals dull black seeds, or dark to blackish-brown seeds in some escaped regions, such as Europe.

The seeds are dispersed by wind and water and are transported when the whole plant detaches and rolls on the wind as a tumbleweed. The seed does not persist in the soil seed bank, dying within about a year if it fails to germinate. The species is a C_{4} plant, specifically of the NADP-ME type. It develops herbicide resistance unusually quickly, and quadruple-resistant populations have developed in North America.

Bassia scoparia is native to a region ranging from Central Europe to Asia and is now widespread throughout the world. While having a variety of beneficial uses, it is also considered an invasive weed.

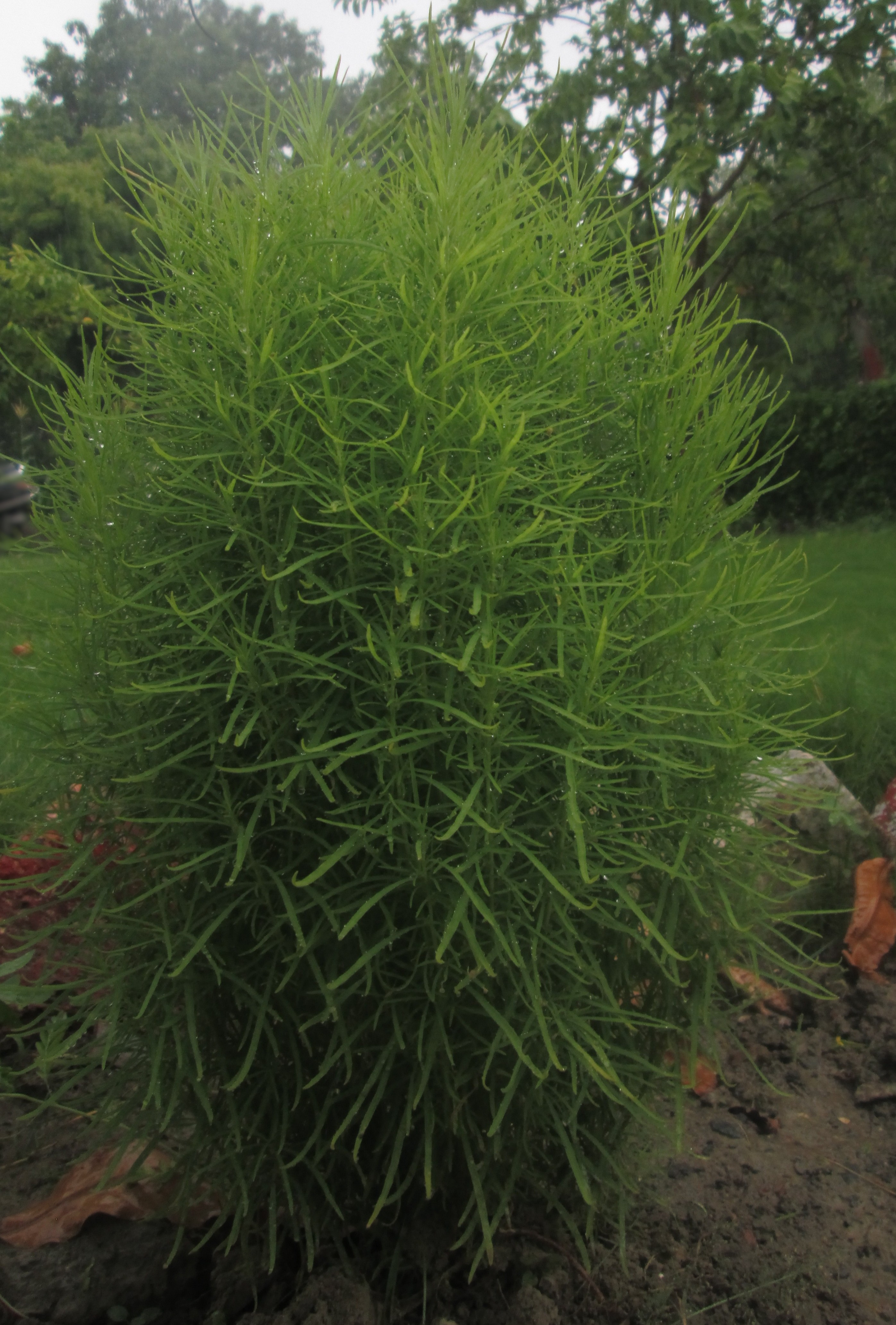
Close-up photo of Bassia scoparia taken outdoors in natural light. Captured in India

== Taxonomy ==
The species was first published in 1753 by Carl Linnaeus, who named it Chenopodium scoparium. In 1809, it was placed in the genus Kochia by Heinrich Schrader. It was transferred to Bassia in 1978 by Andrew J. Scott. Kochia was included in Bassia in 2011 following phylogenetic studies.

== Uses ==
This plant is grown as an ornamental plant as evergreen foliage for landscapes, as well as for its red fall foliage. It has also been useful in erosion control on denuded soils. It has been suggested as an agent of phytoremediation, because it is a hyperaccumulator of chromium, lead, mercury, selenium, silver, zinc, and uranium.

=== Tonburi ===
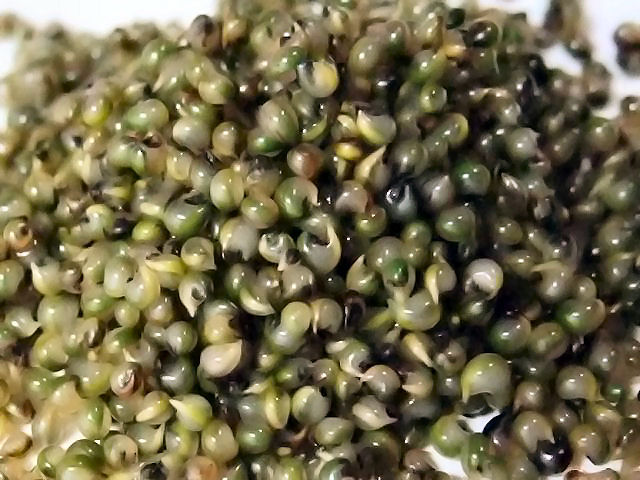
Tonburi

In Japan the dull black seeds are used as a food garnish called tonburi (とんぶり) (Japanese). Because its texture is similar to caviar, it has been called "land caviar", "field caviar", and "mountain caviar". It is a chinmi, or delicacy, in Akita prefecture. The seed dish is prepared by boiling the seeds for about 30 minutes, soaking them in running water, and rubbing them in the hands to hull them.

=== Traditional medicine ===
The seeds are used in traditional Chinese medicine to help regulate disorders such as hyperlipidemia, hypertension, obesity, and atherosclerosis. In a study of mice fed a high-fat diet, an extract of the seeds limited obesity. They contain momordin Ic, a triterpene saponin.

=== Foraging ===
The plant is a moderately useful forage for livestock, especially on dry lands. The plant contains higher levels of protein and oxalate than most grasses and fodder plants. However, its use is limited by its toxicity in large quantities. Livestock ingesting large amounts can experience weight loss, hyperbilirubinemia, photosensitization, and polyuria.

=== Brooms ===
The plant's common name in Japan is hahaki-gi (箒木) or hōki-gusa (箒草) which signify 'broom-tree' or 'broom-weed', and it has traditionally been used to make brooms.

In Serbia and Bulgaria, brooms are produced by simply tying several dried plants of this species together, using the branches as the broom head and the stems as the handle; this is convenient since the broom does not require a separate handle.

== Culture ==
Medieval Japanese legend has it that this broom tree would disappear from sight whenever approached, and Sakanoue no Korenori wrote a waka poem alluding to this myth.

== Gallery ==
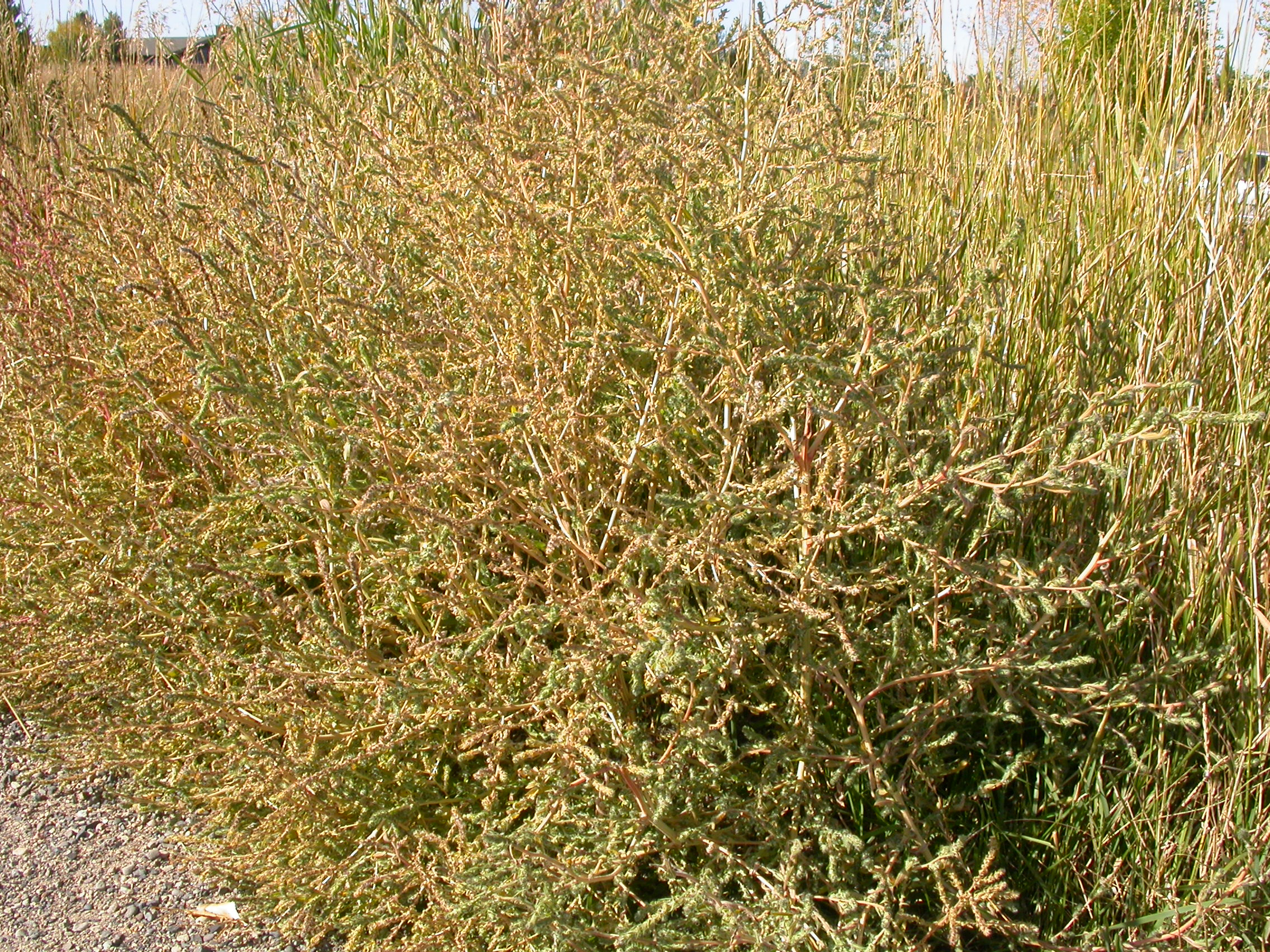
Form

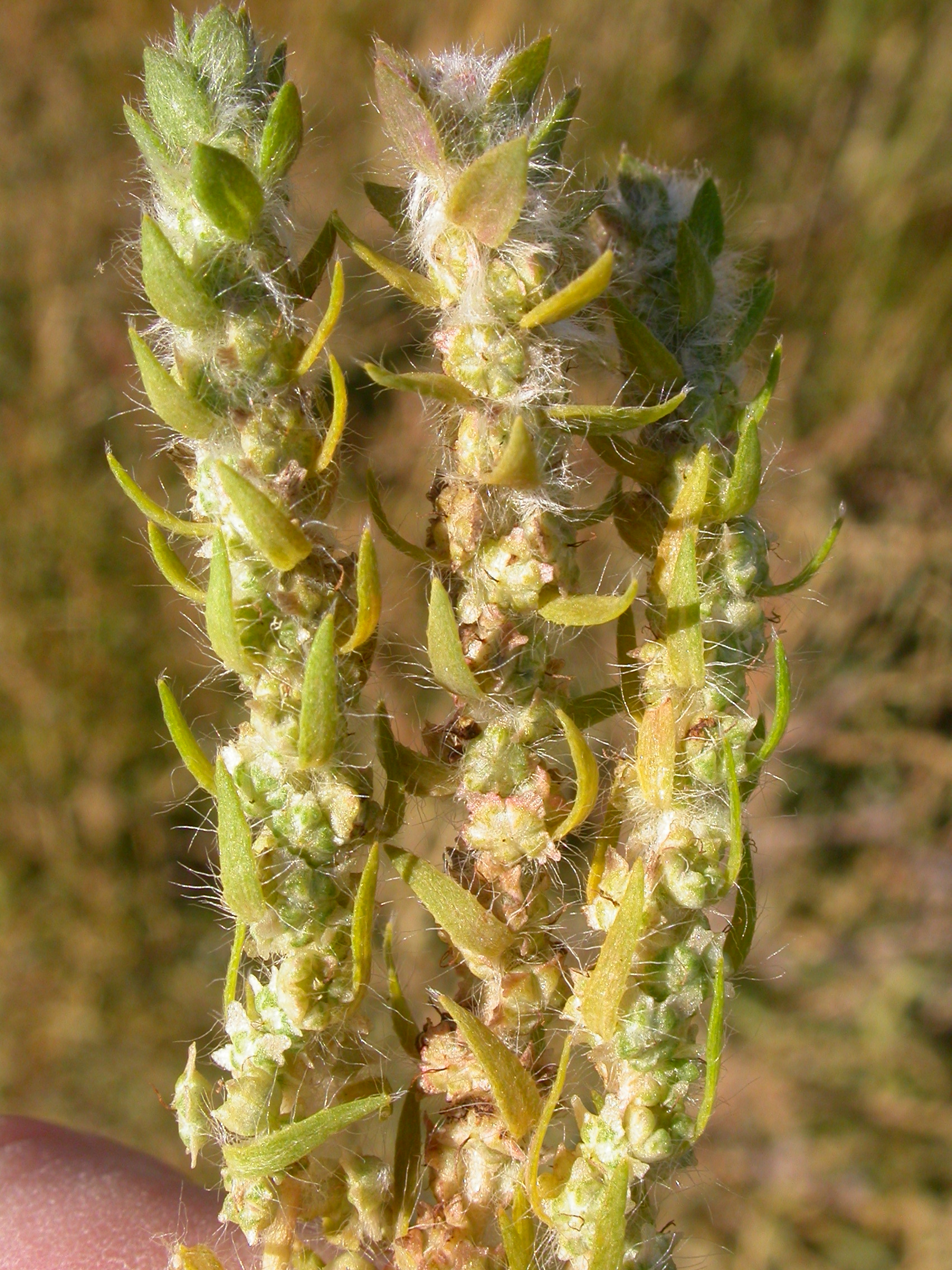
Inflorescence

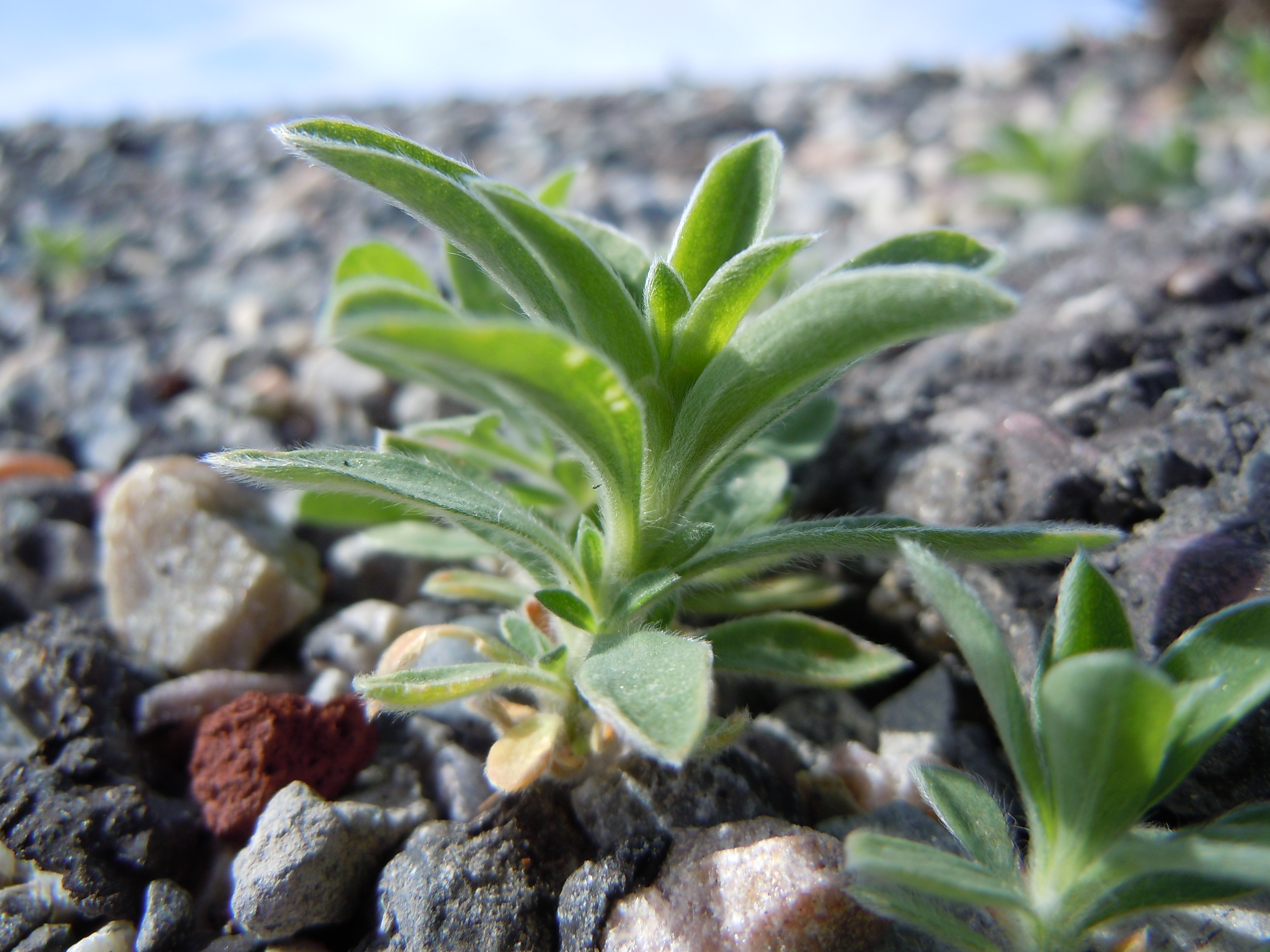
As a weed

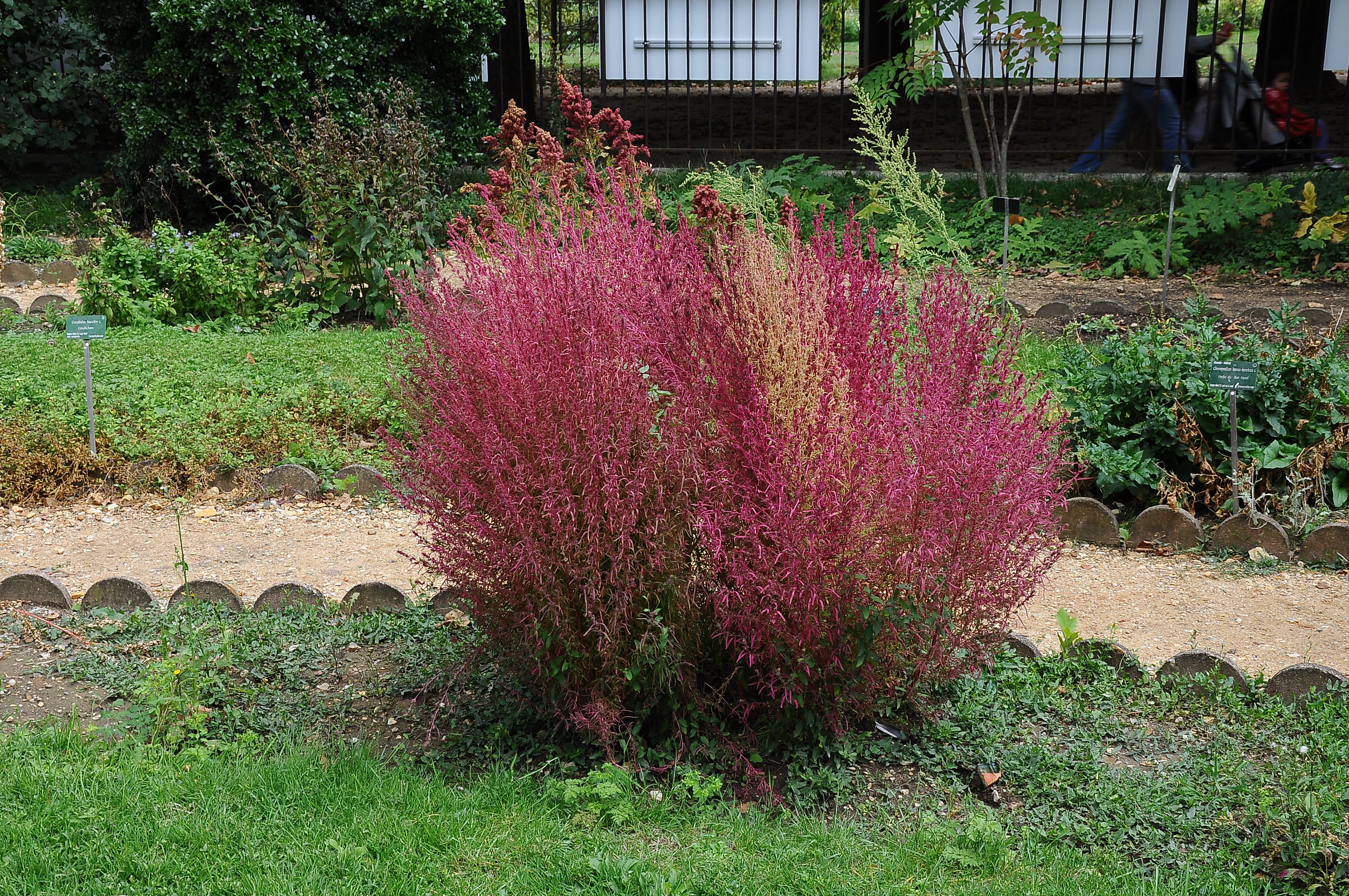
Ornamental planting

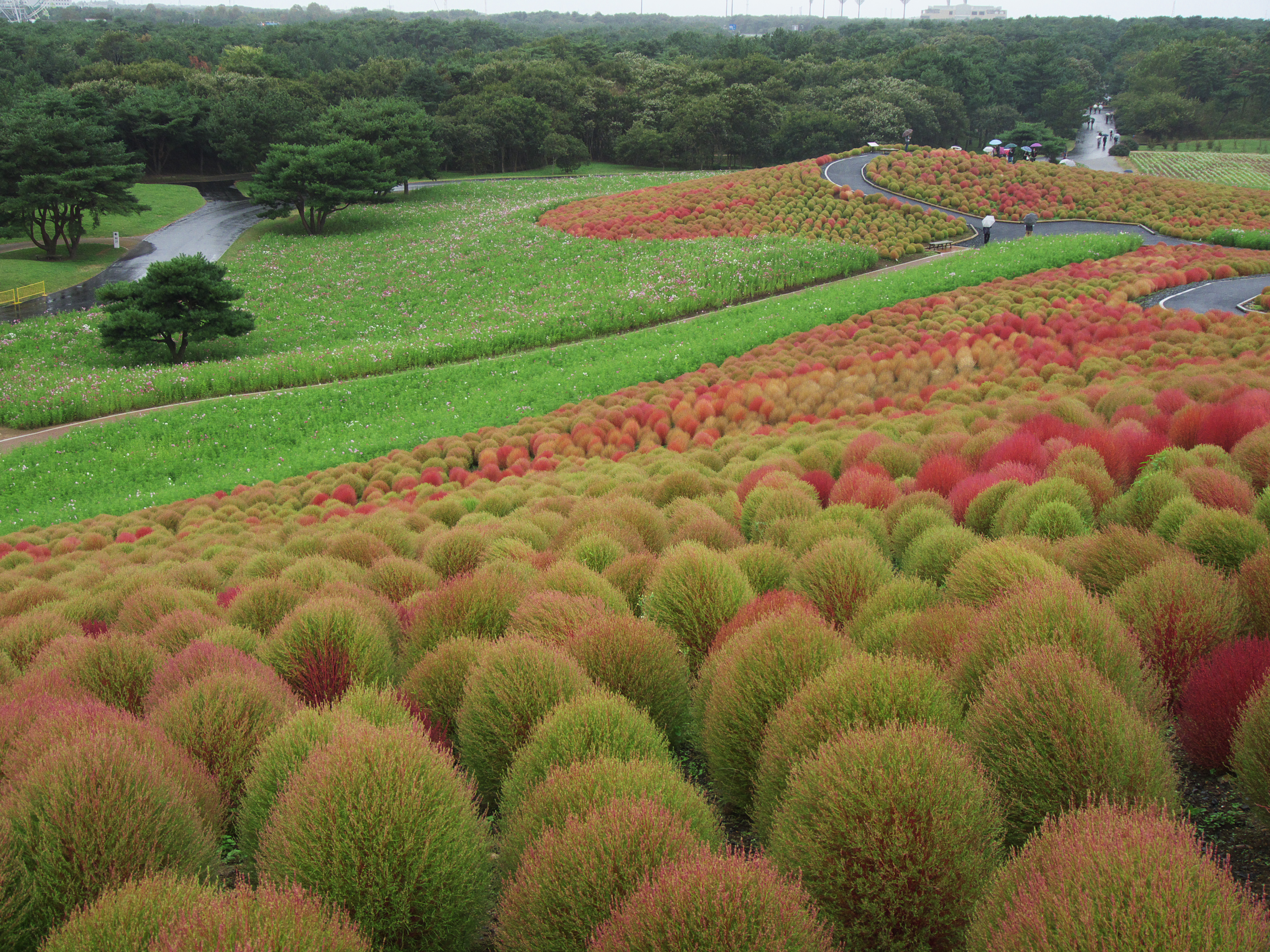
Mass planting at Hitachi Seaside Park, Japan.

== See also ==
- Allelopathy
