= Neokochia californica =

Scientific classification
- Kingdom: Plantae
- Clade: Tracheophytes
- Clade: Angiosperms
- Clade: Eudicots
- Order: Caryophyllales
- Family: Amaranthaceae
- Genus: Neokochia
- Species: N. californica

Binomial name
- Neokochia californica (S.Watson) G.L.Chu & S.C.Sand.

Species of flowering plant

Neokochia californica (syn. Bassia californica, Kochia californica) is a species of flowering plant in the subfamily Camphorosmoideae of the amaranth family known by the common name rusty molly. It is native to the valleys and deserts of southeastern California and adjacent parts of Nevada, where it grows in dry, alkaline soils such as alkali flats and desert washes. This is a perennial herb or small shrub growing one or more sprawling, branching stems to a maximum height near 60 centimetres (24 in). The stems are lined with narrow, elongated, somewhat flattened fleshy leaves up to about a centimeter long. The leaves and stem are coated in grayish or brownish hairs. The inflorescence is made up of one or more tiny hairy flowers sprouting from the axils of the leaves.
