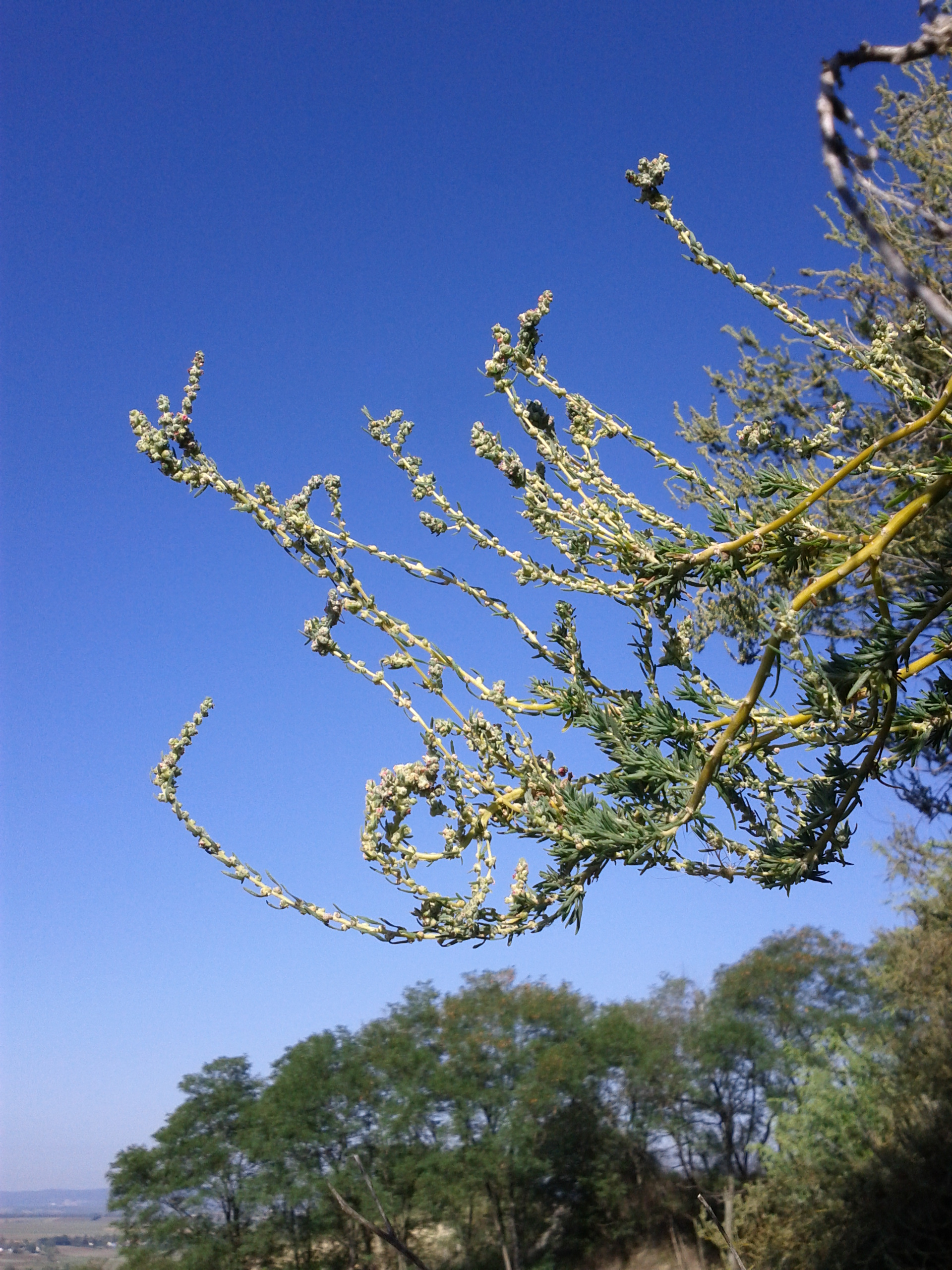

Scientific classification
- Kingdom: Plantae
- Clade: Tracheophytes
- Clade: Angiosperms
- Clade: Eudicots
- Order: Caryophyllales
- Family: Amaranthaceae
- Genus: Bassia
- Species: B. prostrata

Binomial name
- Bassia prostrata (L.) A.J.Scott

Synonyms
- Kochia prostrata (L.) Schrad.

= Bassia prostrata =

Species of flowering plant

Bassia prostrata, the forage kochia, is a Eurasian plant in the subfamily Camphorosmoideae of the family Amaranthaceae (formerly treated as Chenopodiaceae), introduced to the United States as rangeland forage and for fire control.
