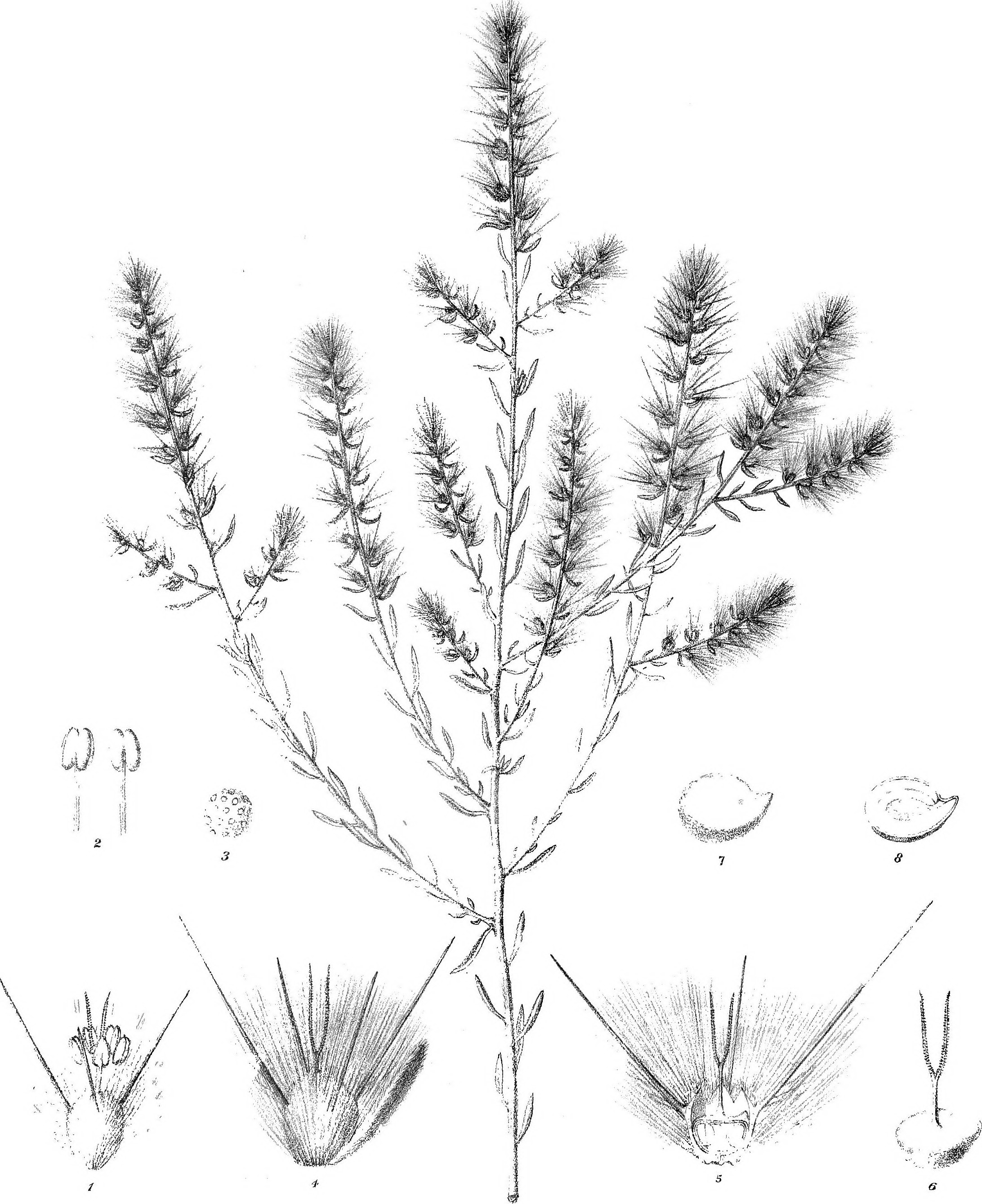
- As Bassia eurotioides Plate LXXXI: 1. flower 2. front & back view of stamens 3. pollen grain 4. fruit-bearing calyx 5. vertical section of fruit-bearing calyx 6. fruit (calyx removed); 7. seed 8. longitudinal section of seed

Scientific classification
- Kingdom: Plantae
- Clade: Tracheophytes
- Clade: Angiosperms
- Clade: Eudicots
- Order: Caryophyllales
- Family: Amaranthaceae
- Genus: Sclerolaena
- Species: S. eurotioides

Binomial name
- Sclerolaena eurotioides (F.Muell.) A.J.Scott

Synonyms
- Echinopsilon eurotioides F.Muell. Bassia eurotioides (F.Muell.) F.Muell. Chenolea eurotioides F.Muell. ex Benth.

= Sclerolaena eurotioides =

Species of plant in the amaranth family

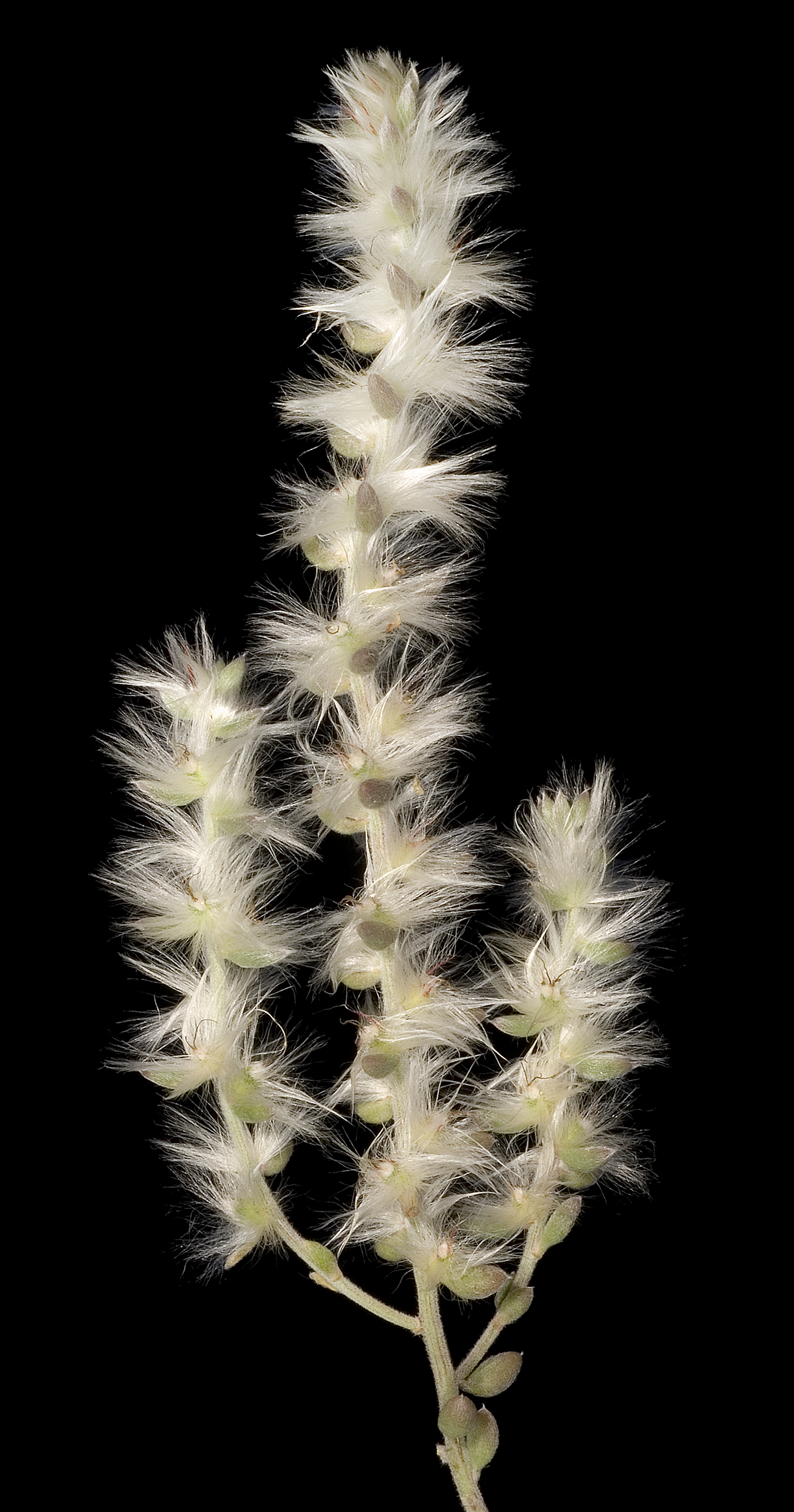

Sclerolaena eurotioides is a species of flowering plant in the family Amaranthaceae, native to Western Australia. It was first described in 1869 by Ferdinand von Mueller as Echinopsilon eurotioides, but was transferred to the genus, Sclerolaena in 1978 by Andrew John Scott.
