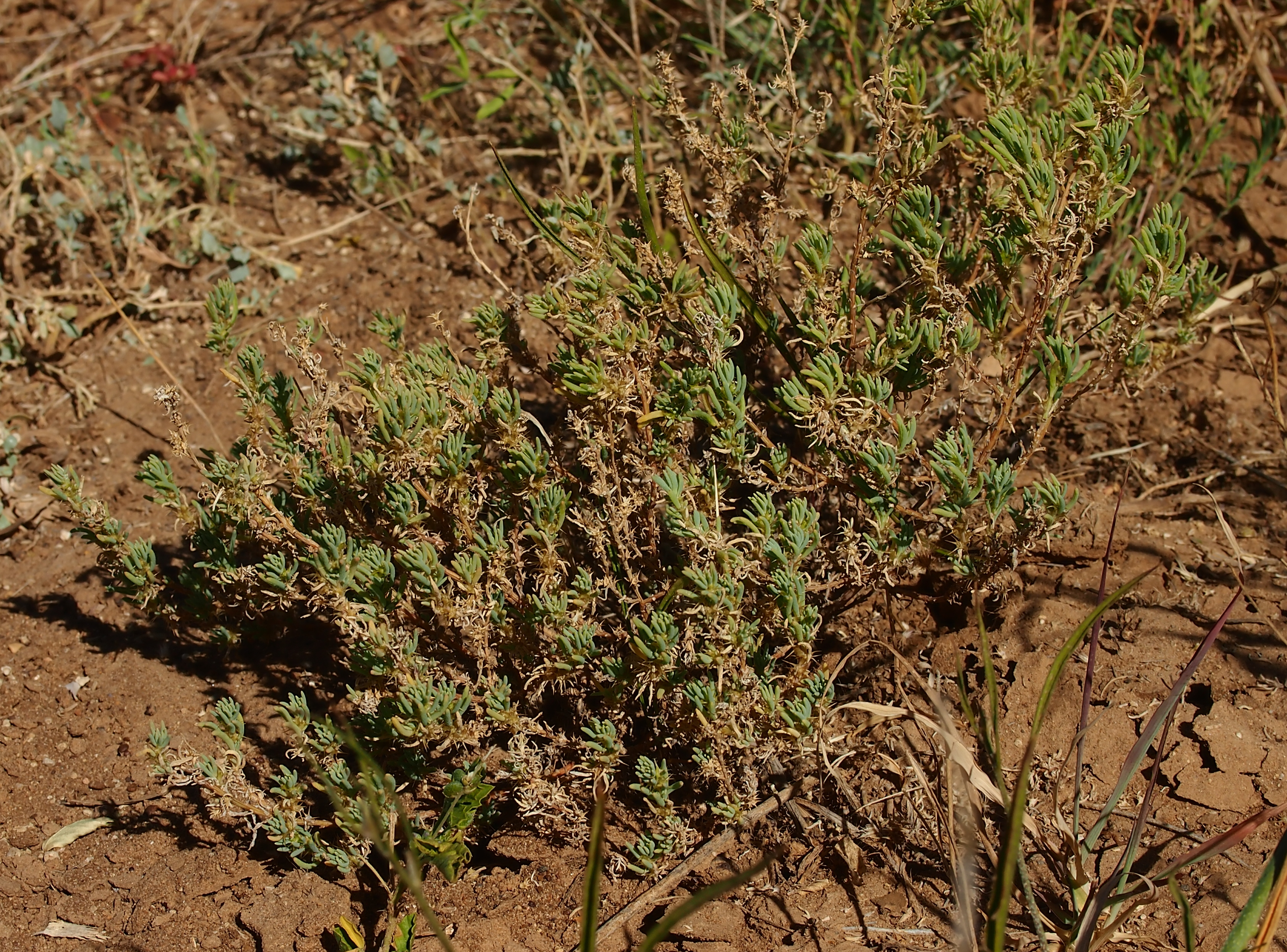
- Habit
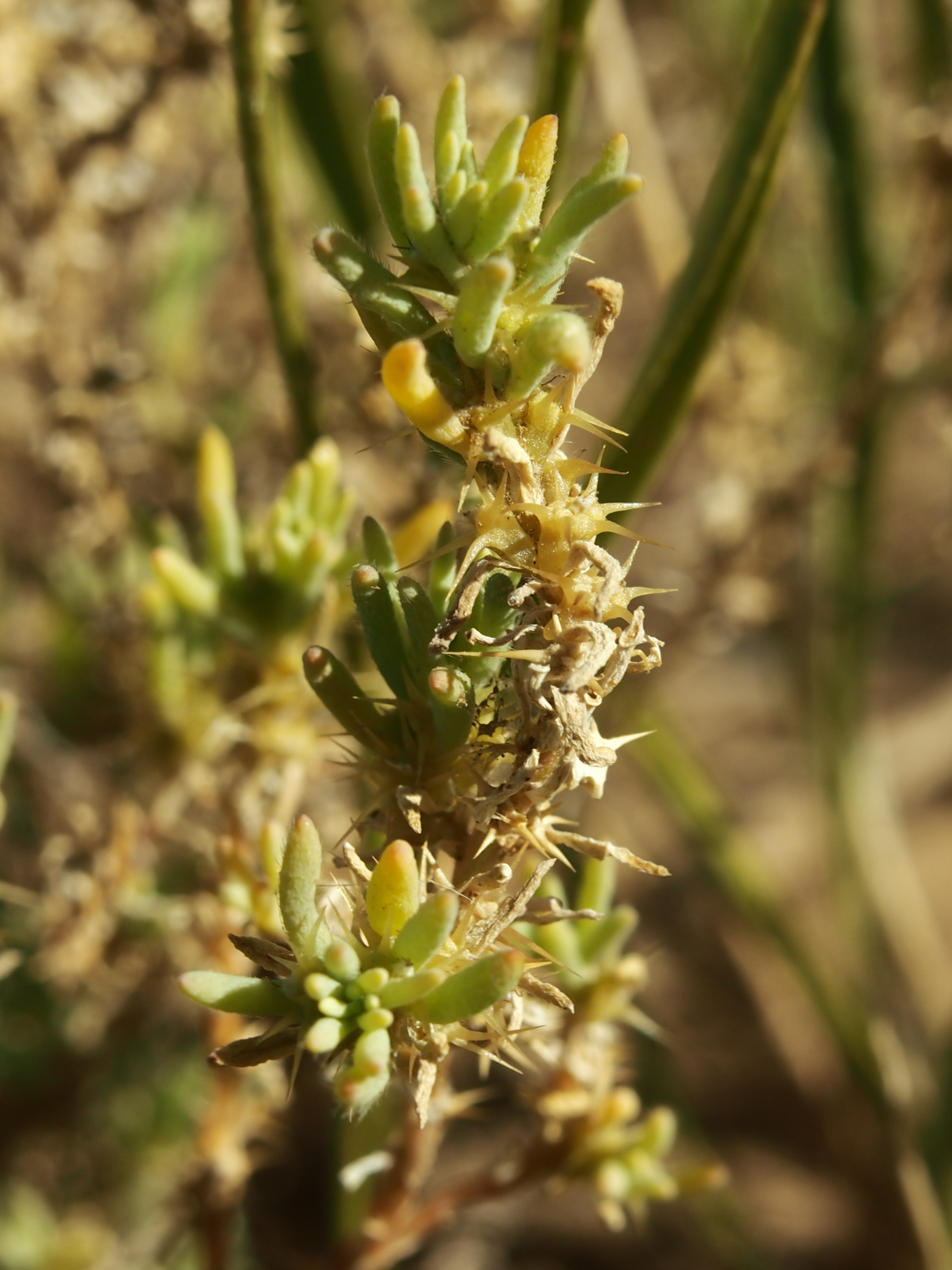
- Foliage and fruit

Scientific classification
- Kingdom: Plantae
- Clade: Tracheophytes
- Clade: Angiosperms
- Clade: Eudicots
- Order: Caryophyllales
- Family: Amaranthaceae
- Genus: Sclerolaena
- Species: S. calcarata

Binomial name
- Sclerolaena calcarata (Ising) A.J.Scott

Synonyms
- Bassia calcarata Ising

= Sclerolaena calcarata =

Species of plant in the amaranth family

Sclerolaena calcarata, the redburr, is a species of flowering plant in the family Amaranthaceae, native to central and eastern Australia. A perennial rounded subshrub reaching 25 cm (10 in), it is typically found growing in heavy soils.

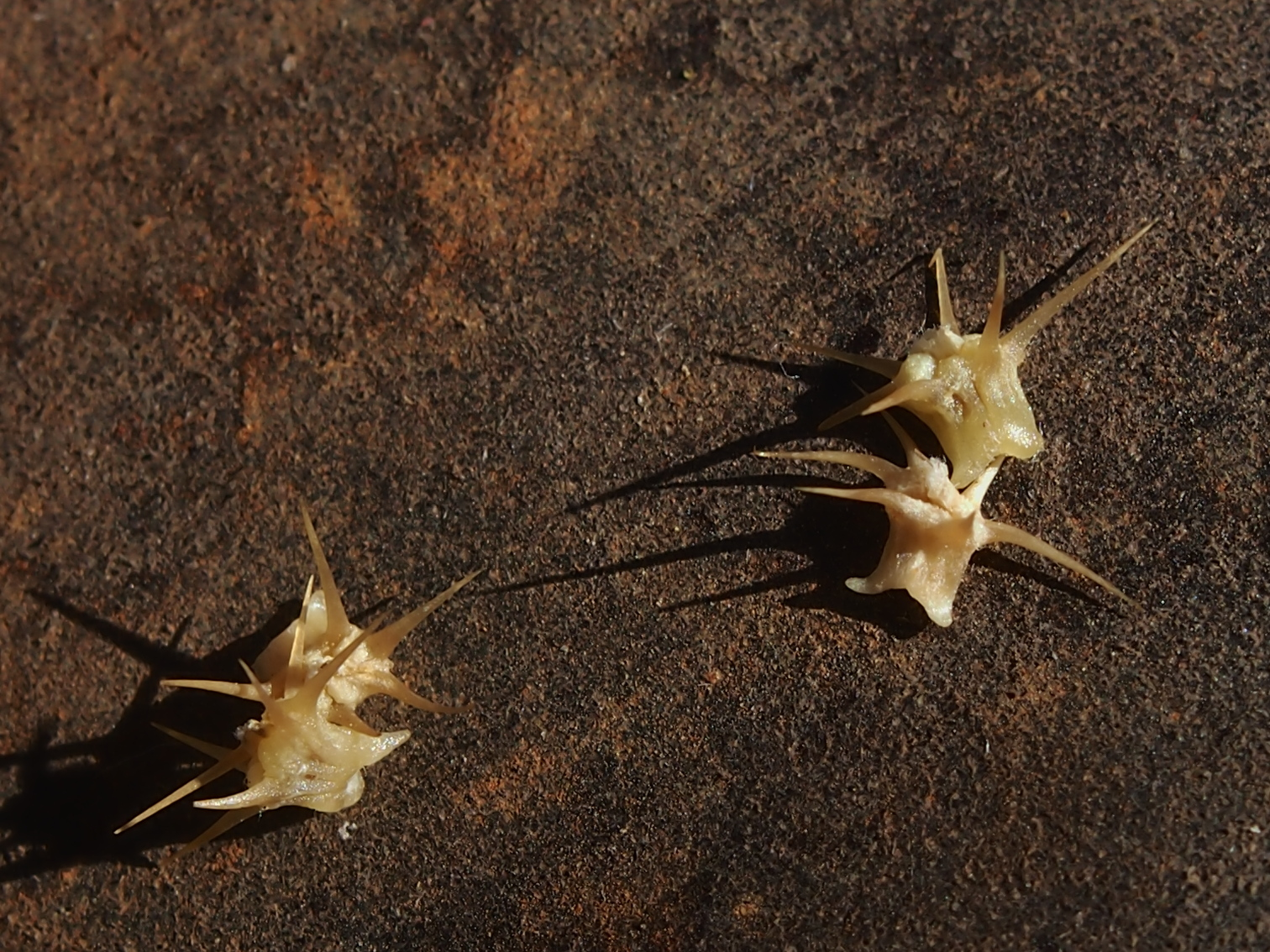
Close-up of fruit
