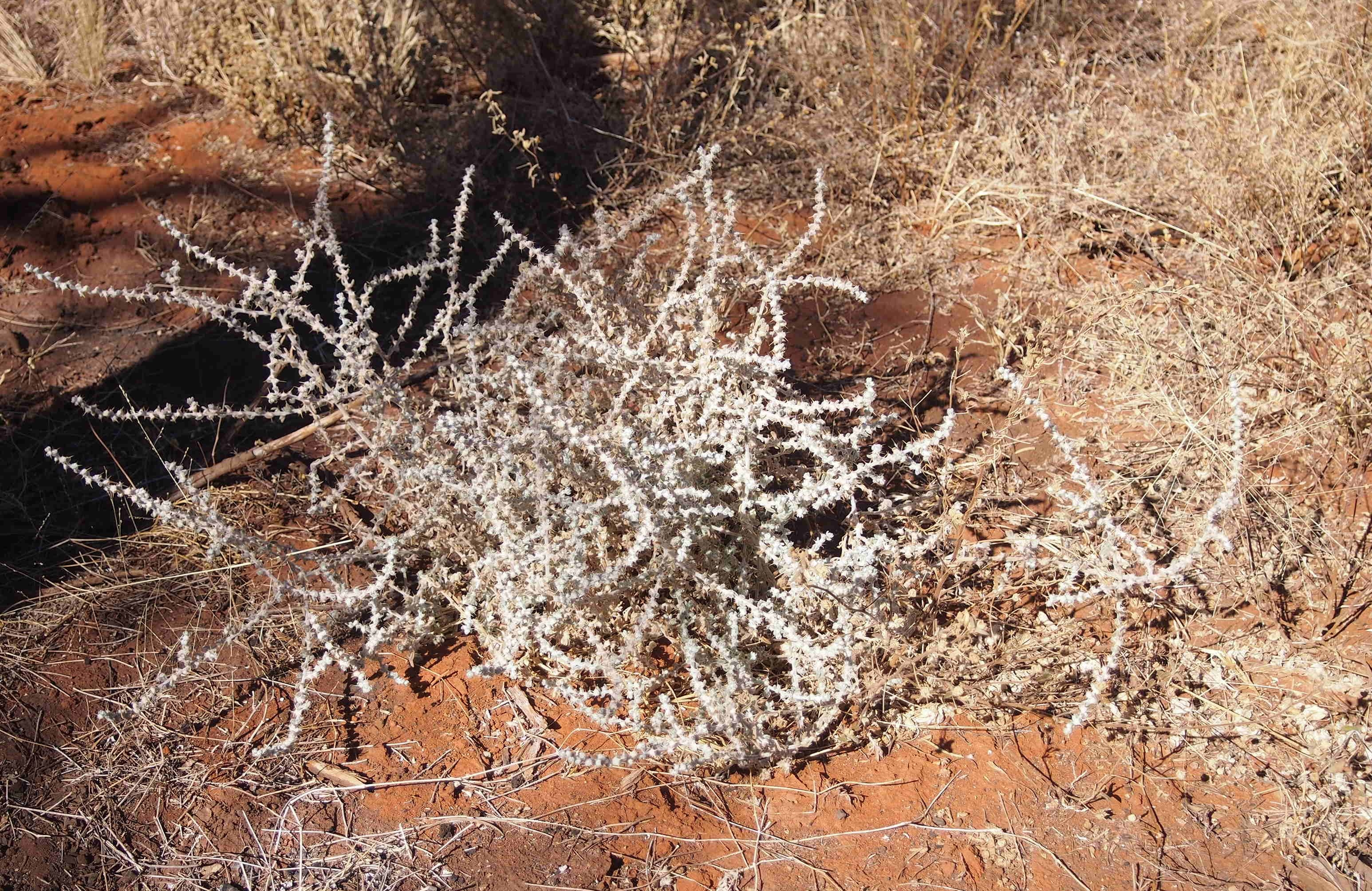
- Habit

Scientific classification
- Kingdom: Plantae
- Clade: Tracheophytes
- Clade: Angiosperms
- Clade: Eudicots
- Order: Caryophyllales
- Family: Amaranthaceae
- Genus: Sclerolaena
- Species: S. cornishiana

Binomial name
- Sclerolaena cornishiana (F.Muell.) A.J.Scott

Synonyms
- Bassia birchii var. cornishiana (F.Muell.) F.Muell.; Bassia cornishiana F.Muell.

= Sclerolaena cornishiana =

Species of plant in the amaranth family

Sclerolaena cornishiana, the cartwheel burr, is a species of flowering plant in the family Amaranthaceae, native to parts of northern Australia. An annual or perennial, it is an intricately branched herb with solitary flowers.
