= Bassia longifolia =

Bassia longifolia can refer to:

- Bassia longifolia J.Koenig ex L., a synonym of Madhuca longifolia (J.Koenig ex L.) J.F.Macbr.
- Bassia longifolia W.Fitzg., a synonym of Sclerolaena fimbriolata (F.Muell.) A.J.Scott
