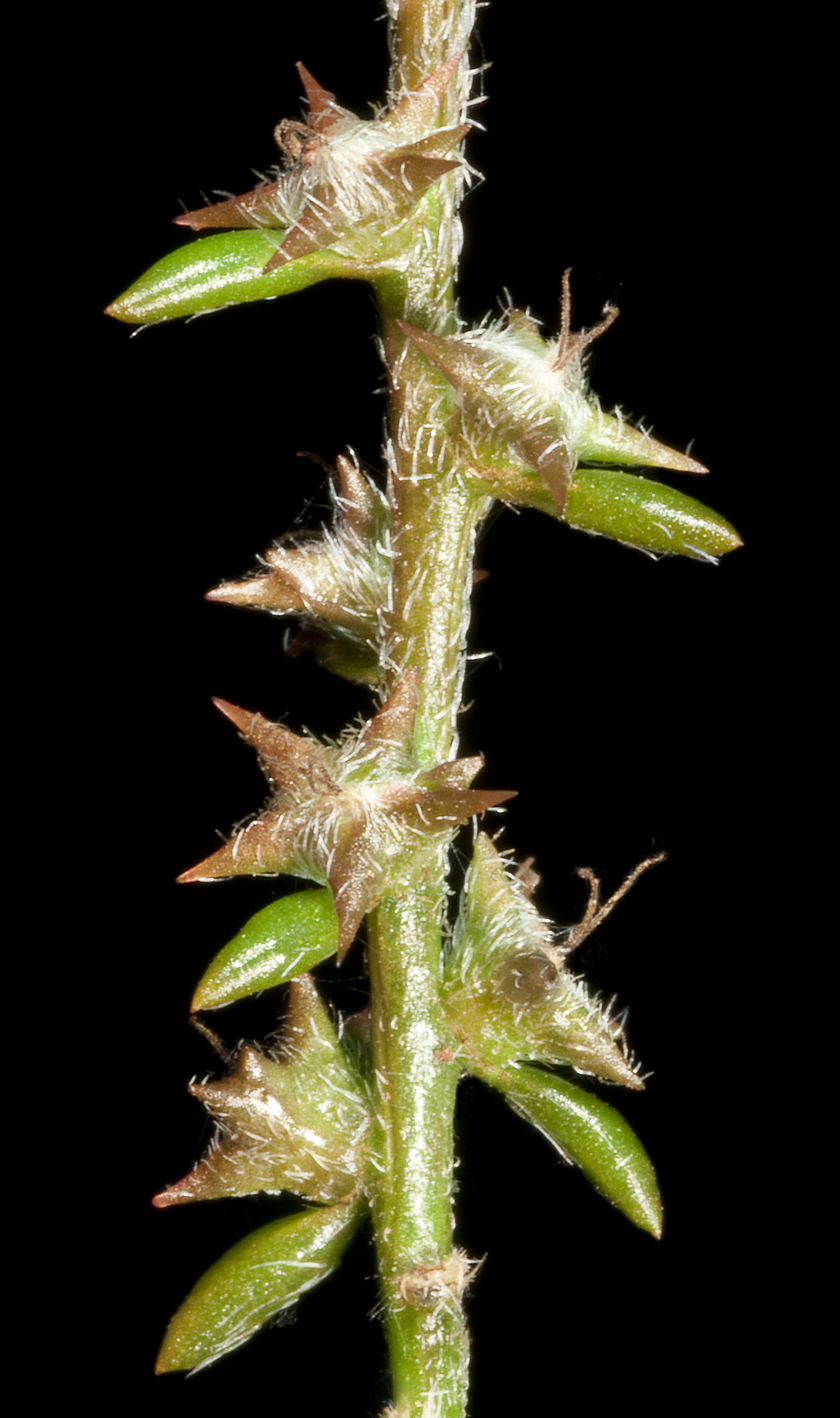

Scientific classification
- Kingdom: Plantae
- Clade: Tracheophytes
- Clade: Angiosperms
- Clade: Eudicots
- Order: Caryophyllales
- Family: Amaranthaceae
- Genus: Sclerolaena
- Species: S. parviflora

Binomial name
- Sclerolaena parviflora (R.H.Anderson) A.J.Scott

Synonyms
- Bassia parviflora R.H.Anderson; Austrobassia parviflora (R.H.Anderson) Ulbr.

= Sclerolaena parviflora =

Species of plant in the amaranth family

Sclerolaena parviflora (common names - Mallee copper burr, Small-flower saltbush) is a species of flowering plant in the family Amaranthaceae, found in every mainland state and territory of Australia. It was first described in 1923 by Robert Henry Anderson as Bassia parviflora, but was transferred to the genus, Sclerolaena in 1978 by Andrew John Scott.

It is found in the central and southern areas of Australia.

== Gallery ==
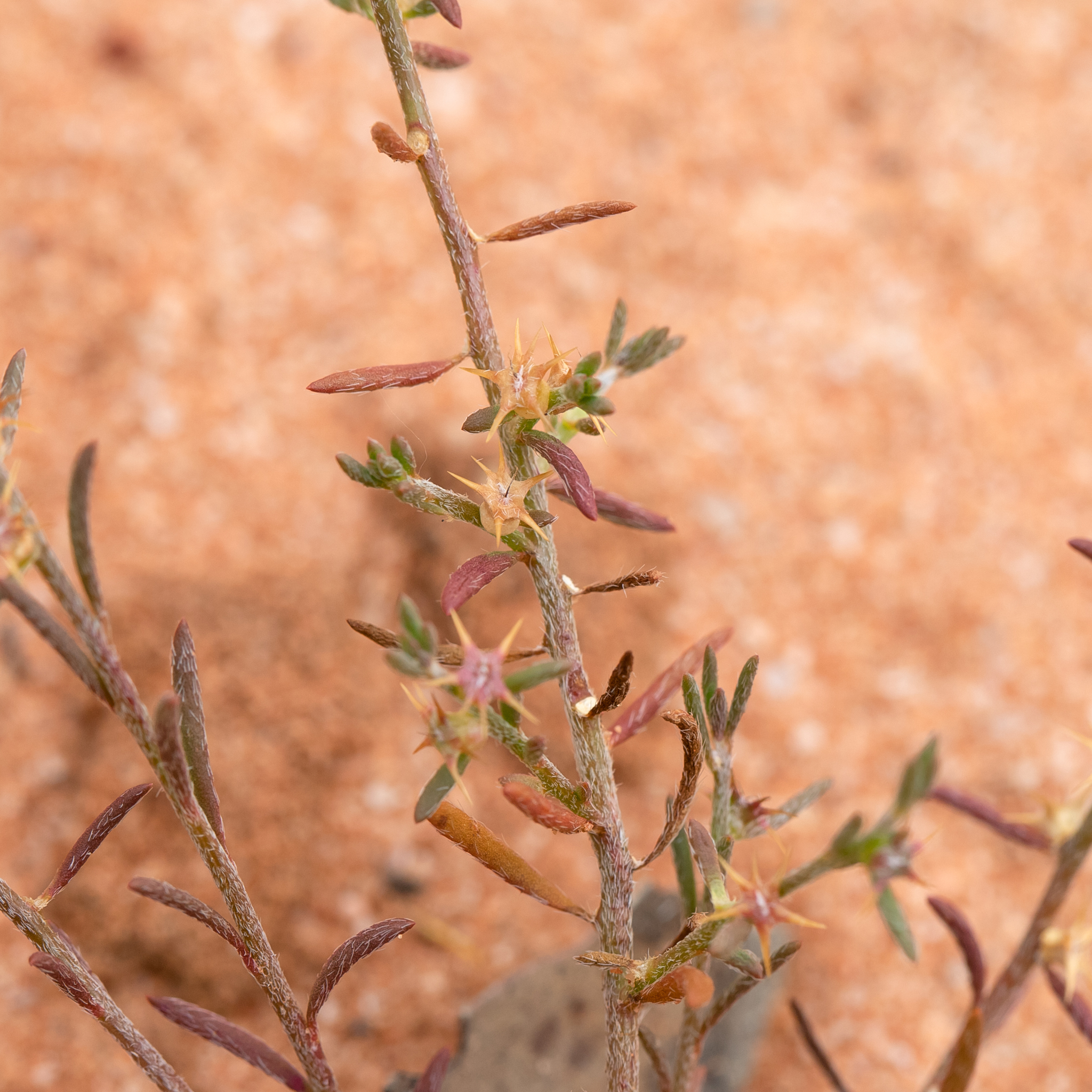

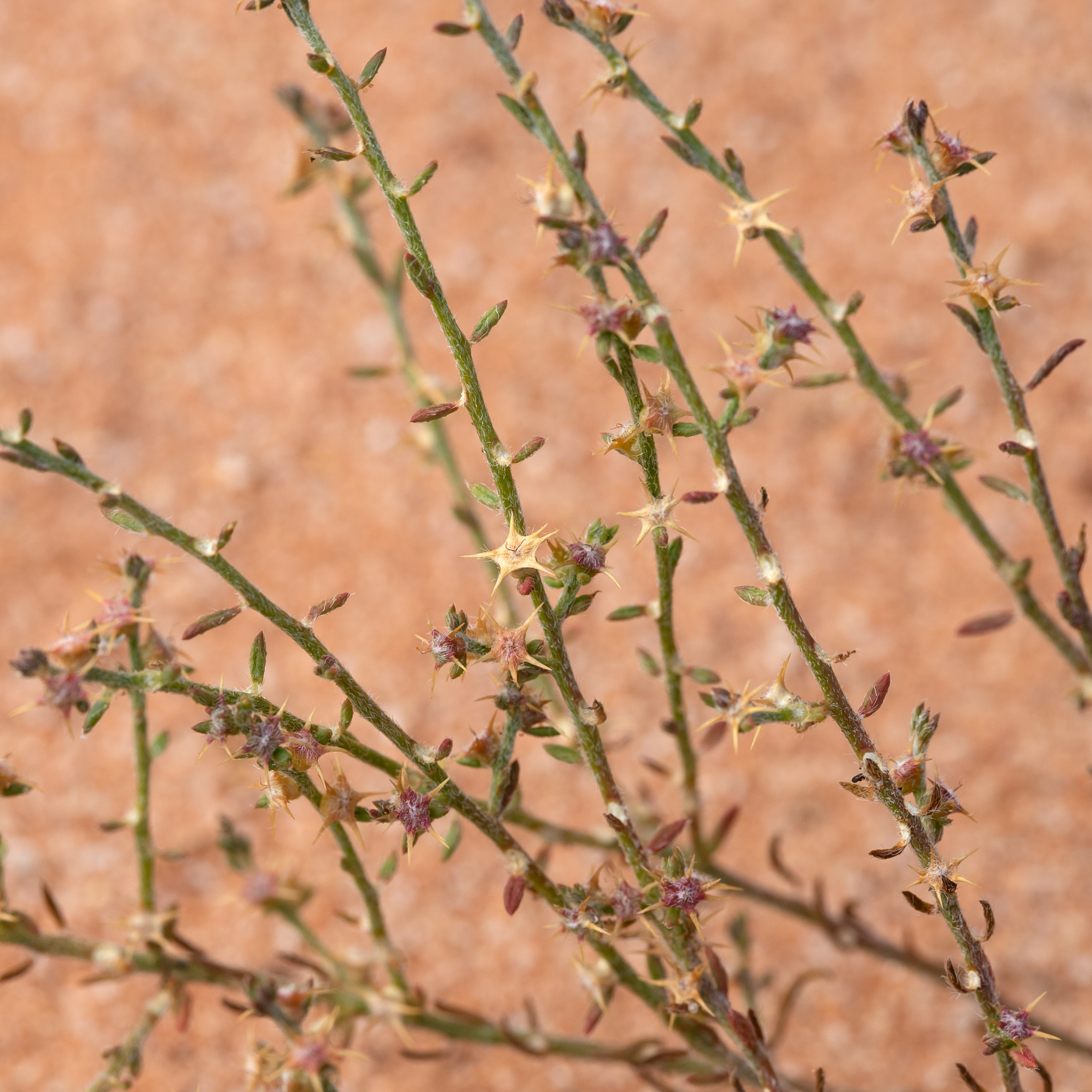

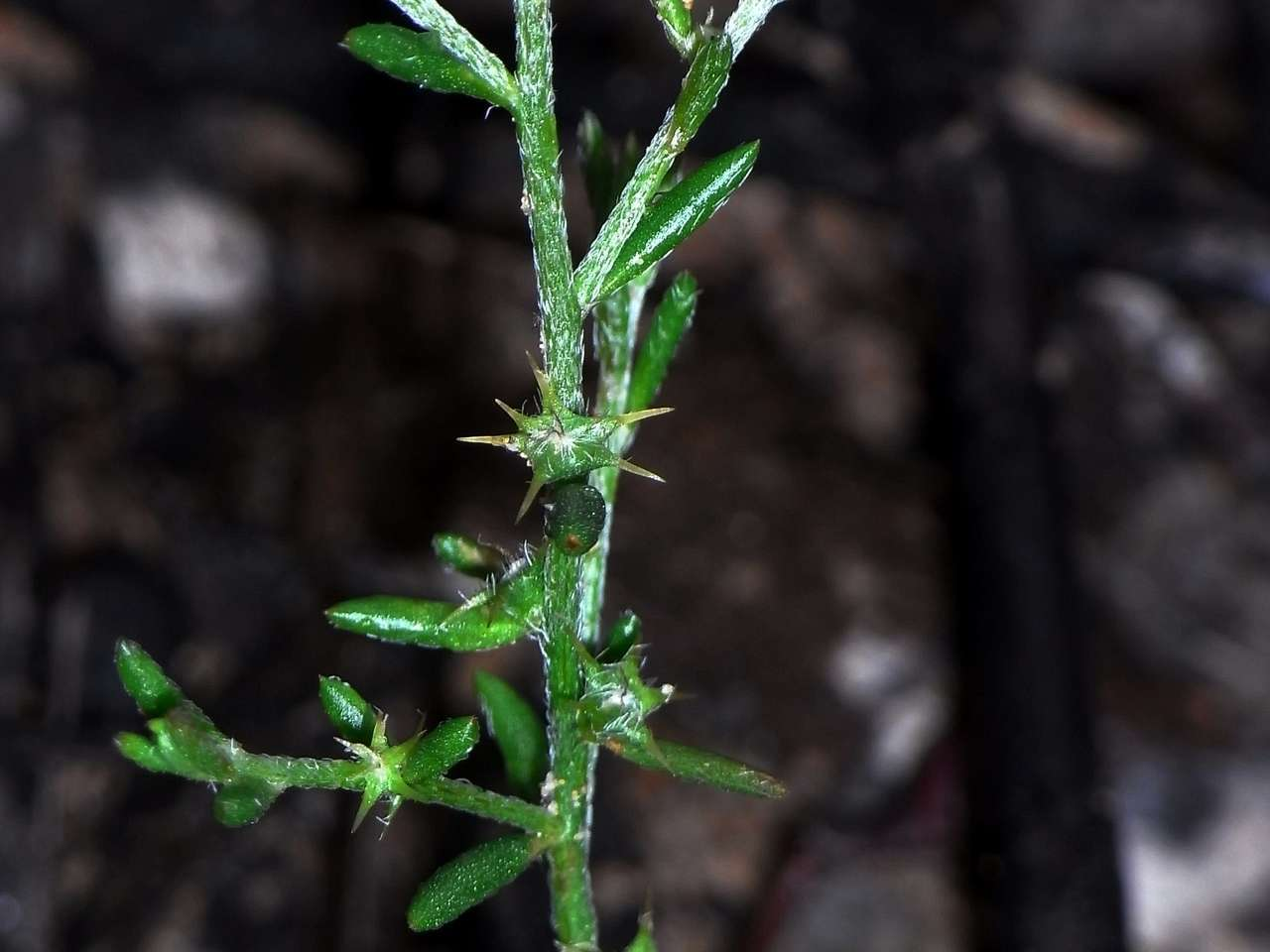
