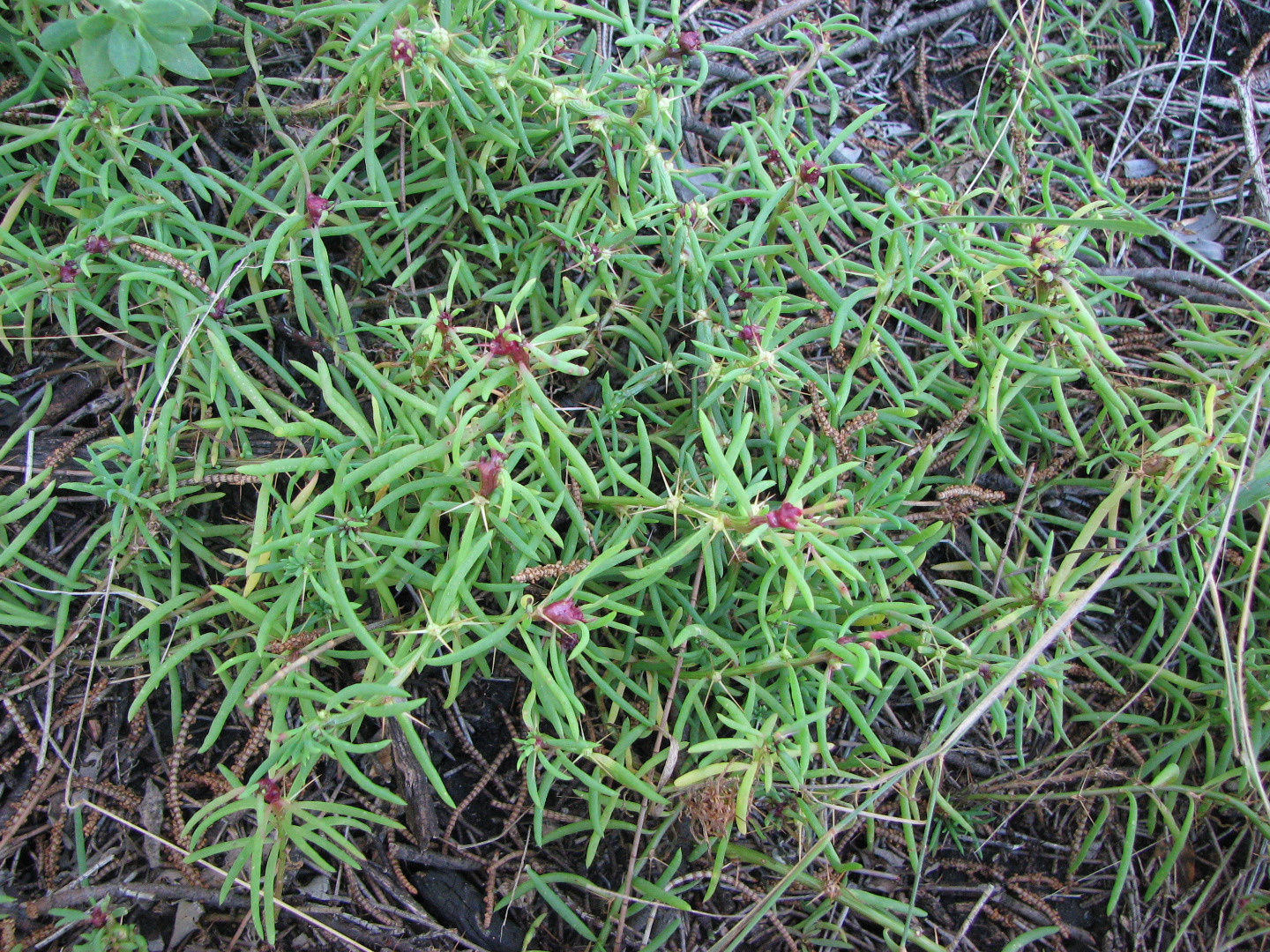

Scientific classification
- Kingdom: Plantae
- Clade: Tracheophytes
- Clade: Angiosperms
- Clade: Eudicots
- Order: Caryophyllales
- Family: Amaranthaceae
- Genus: Sclerolaena
- Species: S. tetracuspis

Binomial name
- Sclerolaena tetracuspis (C.T.White) A.J.Scott

Synonyms
- Bassia tetracuspis C.T.White

= Sclerolaena tetracuspis =

Species of plant in the amaranth family

Sclerolaena tetracuspis, the brigalow burr or dog burr, is a species of flowering plant in the family Amaranthaceae, native to eastern Australia. It is an intricately branched, sprawling perennial shrub typically found growing in heavy soils.
