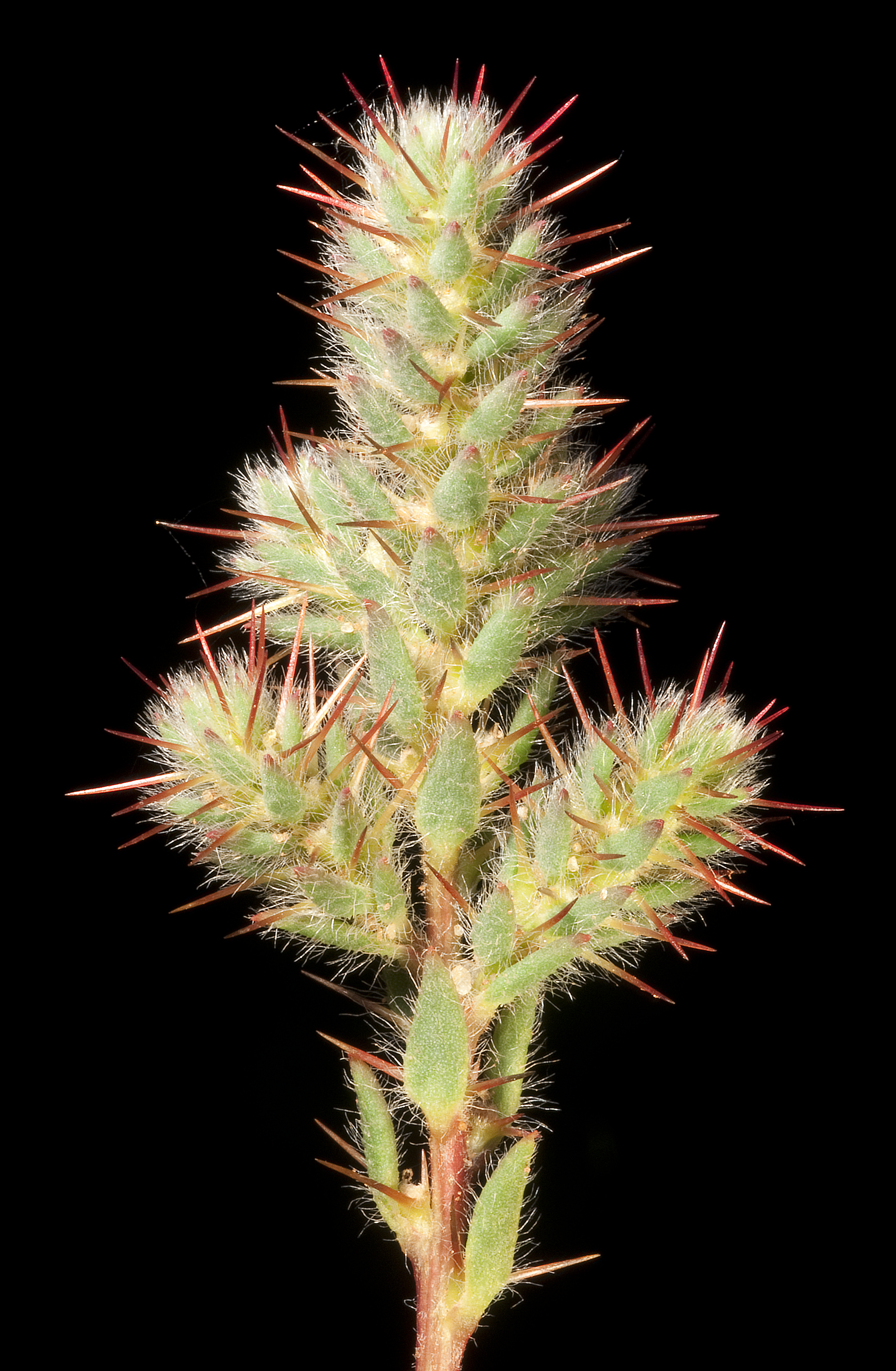

Conservation status
- Near Threatened (TPWCA)

Scientific classification
- Kingdom: Plantae
- Clade: Tracheophytes
- Clade: Angiosperms
- Clade: Eudicots
- Order: Caryophyllales
- Family: Amaranthaceae
- Genus: Sclerolaena
- Species: S. densiflora

Binomial name
- Sclerolaena densiflora (W.Fitzg.) A.J.Scott

Synonyms
- Bassia densiflora W.Fitzg.

= Sclerolaena densiflora =

Species of plant in the amaranth family

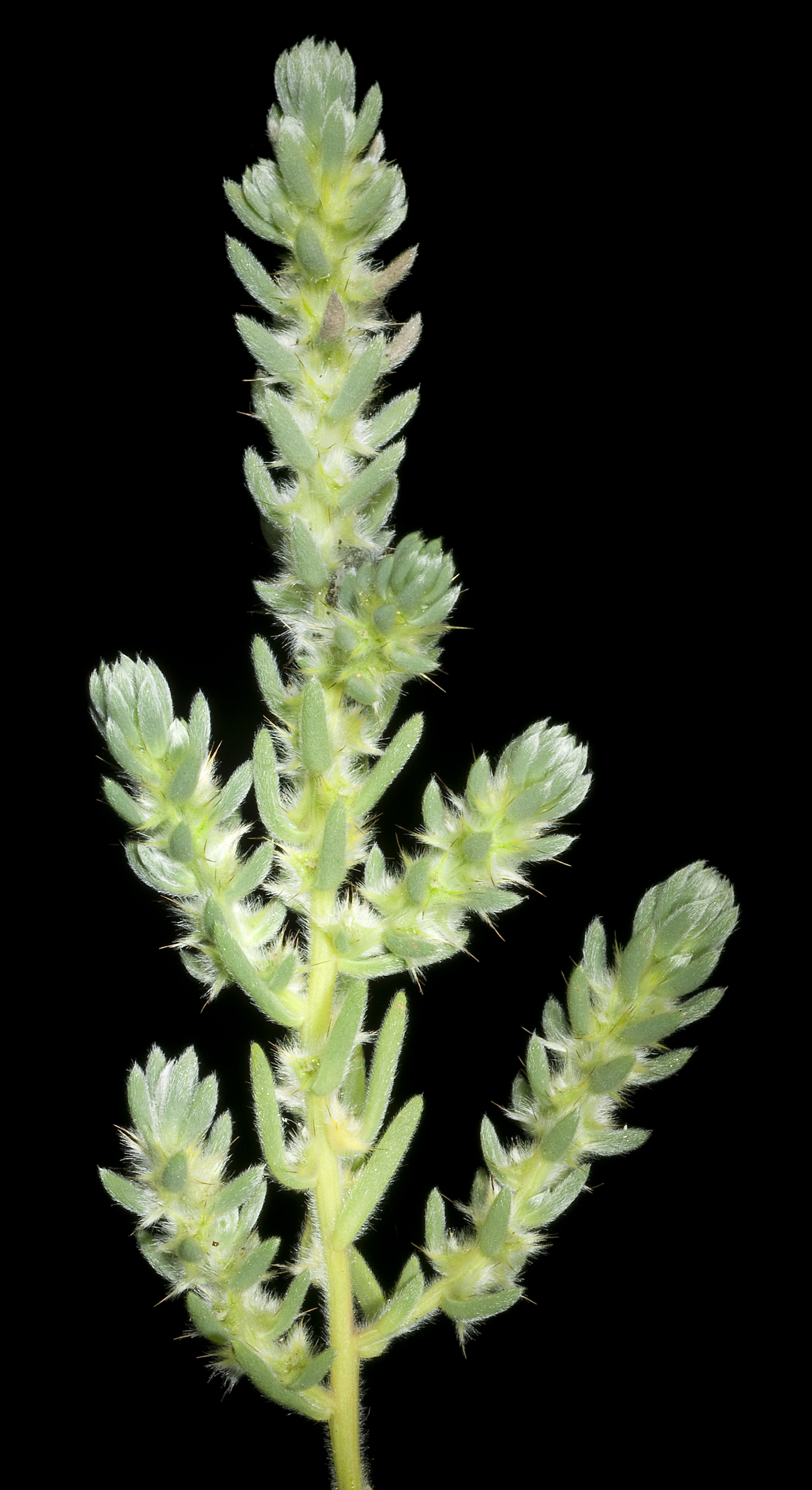

Sclerolaena densiflora is a species of flowering plant in the family Amaranthaceae, native to Western Australia. It was first described in 1904 by William Vincent Fitzgerald as Bassia densiflora, but was transferred to the genus, Sclerolaena in 1978 by Andrew John Scott.

It is found in the central and northern deserts of Western Australia, and also in the Northern Territory where it is considered to be "near threatened".

== Description ==
This chenopod is an erect perennial, growing to 30 cm (12 in) high, which is covered all over with long soft silky hairs. The fleshy linear leaves are 10–20 mm long. The flowers are solitary but cluster at the apex of the branches. There are 5 stamens. The tube is a short inverse cone 1–1.5 mm high, with a square, truncated apex. There are five spines in a 3+2 arrangement, which are positioned at the corners of apex, with one pair close together and often appearing to be one spine.
