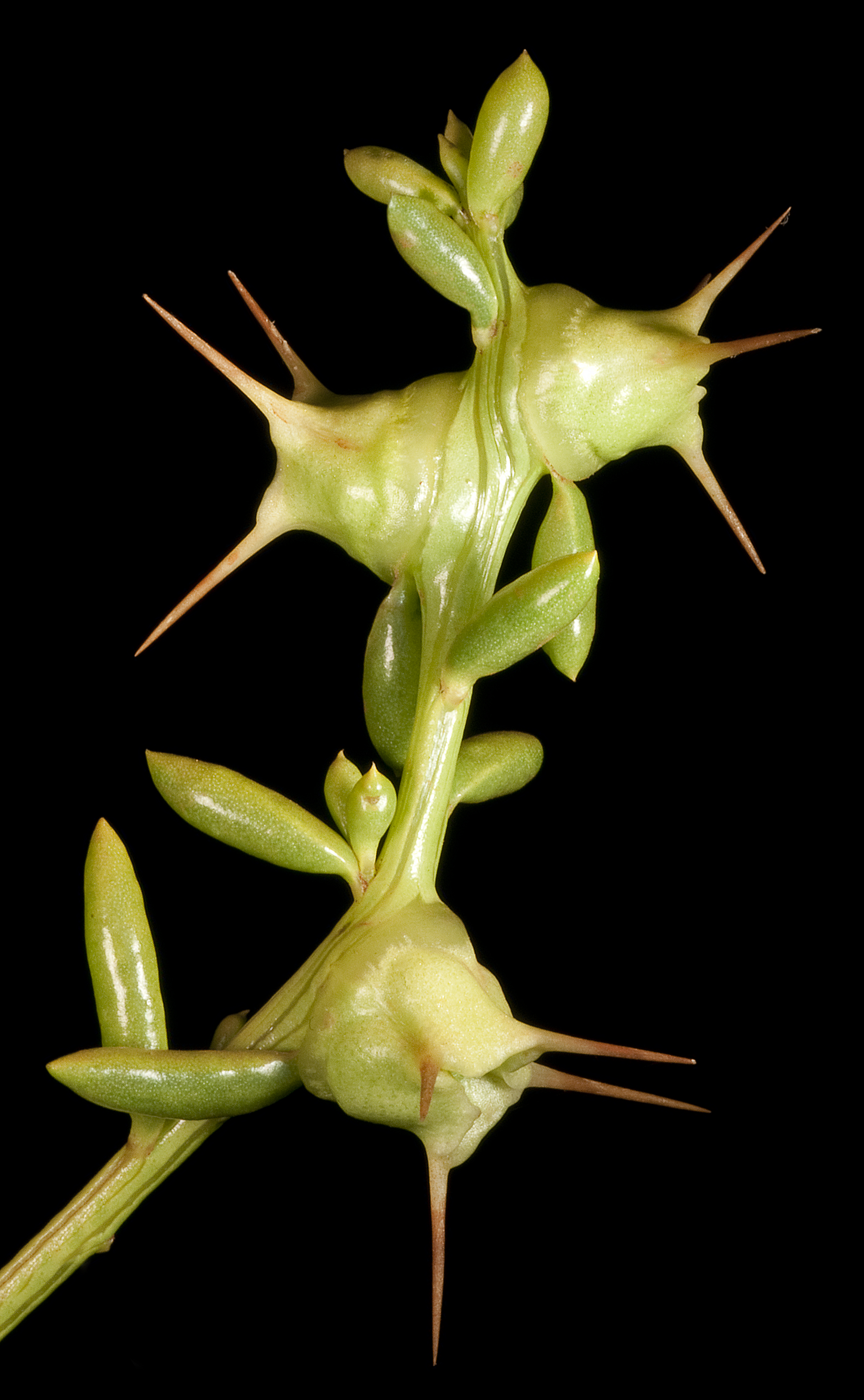

Scientific classification
- Kingdom: Plantae
- Clade: Tracheophytes
- Clade: Angiosperms
- Clade: Eudicots
- Order: Caryophyllales
- Family: Amaranthaceae
- Genus: Sclerolaena
- Species: S. hostilis

Binomial name
- Sclerolaena hostilis (Diels) Domin

Synonyms
- Bassia hostilis Diels

= Sclerolaena hostilis =

Species of plant in the amaranth family

Sclerolaena hostilis is a species of flowering plant in the family Amaranthaceae, native to Western Australia. It was first described in 1904 by Ludwig Diels as Bassia hostilis, but was transferred to the genus, Sclerolaena in 1921 by Karel Domin.

(Australian authorities still place the genus Sclerolaena in the Chenopodiaceae family.)

It is found in north-western Western Australia between Roebourne and Nullagine, along creeks and stony plains.
