= Sclerolaena divaricata =

Scientific classification
- Kingdom: Plantae
- Clade: Tracheophytes
- Clade: Angiosperms
- Clade: Eudicots
- Order: Caryophyllales
- Family: Amaranthaceae
- Genus: Sclerolaena
- Species: S. divaricata

Binomial name
- Sclerolaena divaricata (R.Br.) Sm.

Synonyms
- Anisacantha divaricata R.Br.; Anisacantha erinacea Moq.; Bassia divaricata (R.Br.) F.Muell.

Species of plant in the amaranth family

Sclerolaena divaricata, the tangled copper-burr, is a species of flowering plant in the family Amaranthaceae, native to southeastern Australia. A rounded perennial shrub, it has terete leaves.
