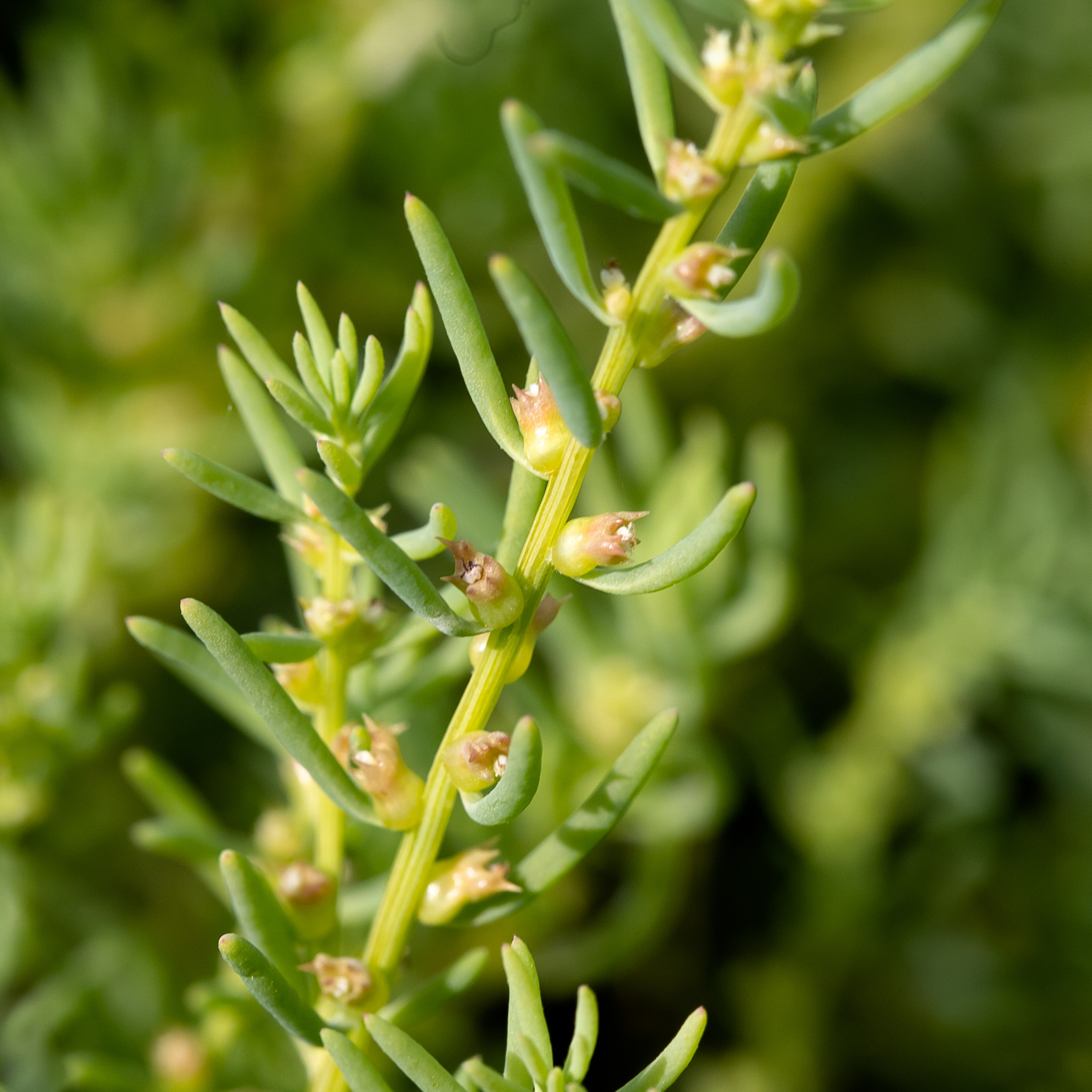

Scientific classification
- Kingdom: Plantae
- Clade: Tracheophytes
- Clade: Angiosperms
- Clade: Eudicots
- Order: Caryophyllales
- Family: Amaranthaceae
- Genus: Sclerolaena
- Species: S. anisacanthoides

Binomial name
- Sclerolaena anisacanthoides (F.Muell.) Domin

Synonyms
- List: Anisacantha anisacanthoides (F.Muell.) Druce; Anisacantha brevicuspis F.Muell.; Anisacantha echinopsila F.Muell.; Bassia anisacanthoides (F.Muell.) R.H.Anderson; Bassia brevicuspis (F.Muell.) F.Muell.; Bassia echinopsila (F.Muell.) F.Muell.; Chenolea echinopsila F.Mu

= Sclerolaena anisacanthoides =

Species of plant in the amaranth family

Sclerolaena anisacanthoides, the yellow burr, is a species of flowering plant in the family Amaranthaceae, native to eastern Australia. A perennial rounded subshrub reaching 15 cm (6 in), it is typically found growing in heavy soils.
