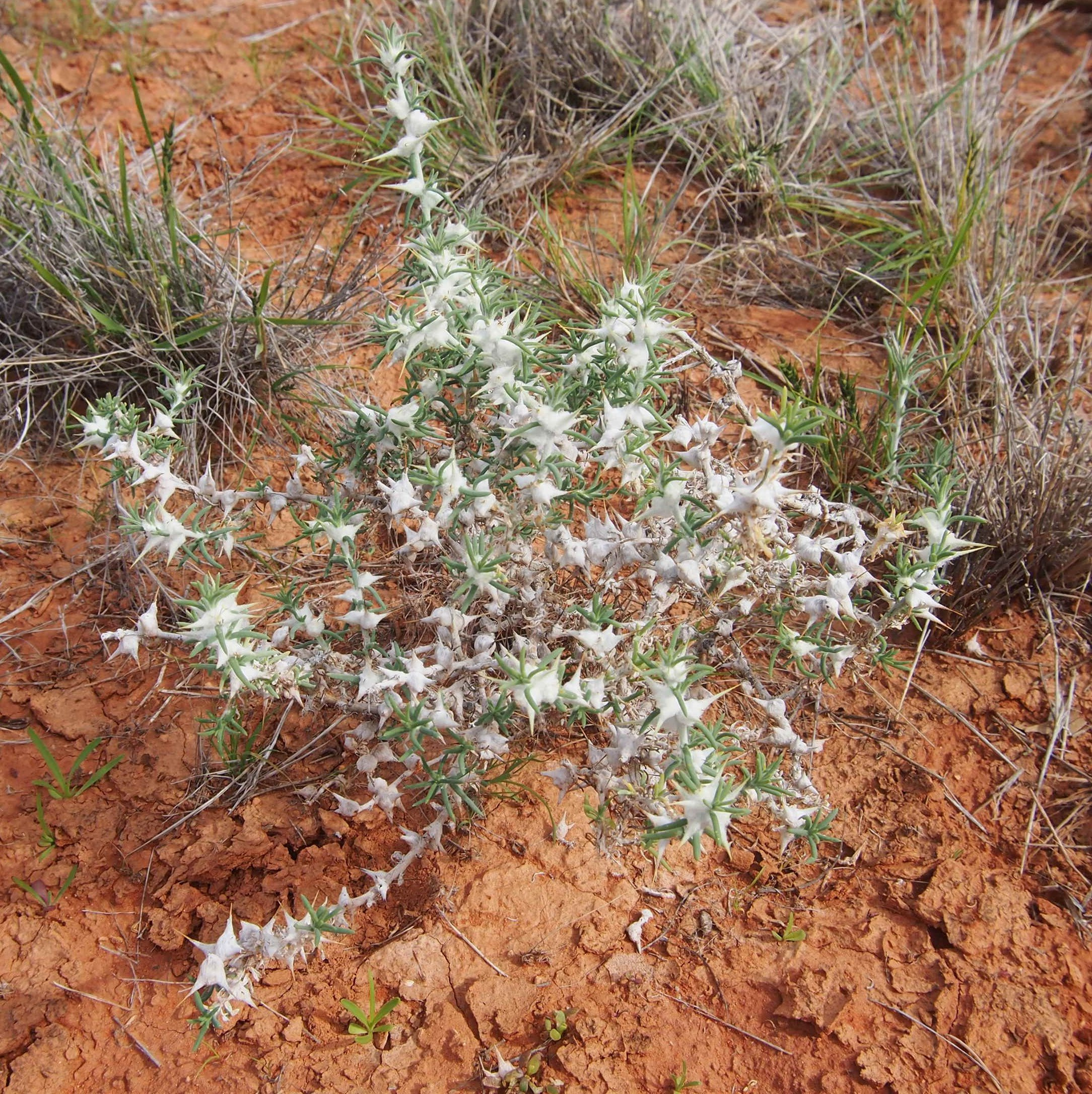

Scientific classification
- Kingdom: Plantae
- Clade: Tracheophytes
- Clade: Angiosperms
- Clade: Eudicots
- Order: Caryophyllales
- Family: Amaranthaceae
- Genus: Sclerolaena
- Species: S. bicornis

Binomial name
- Sclerolaena bicornis Lindl.
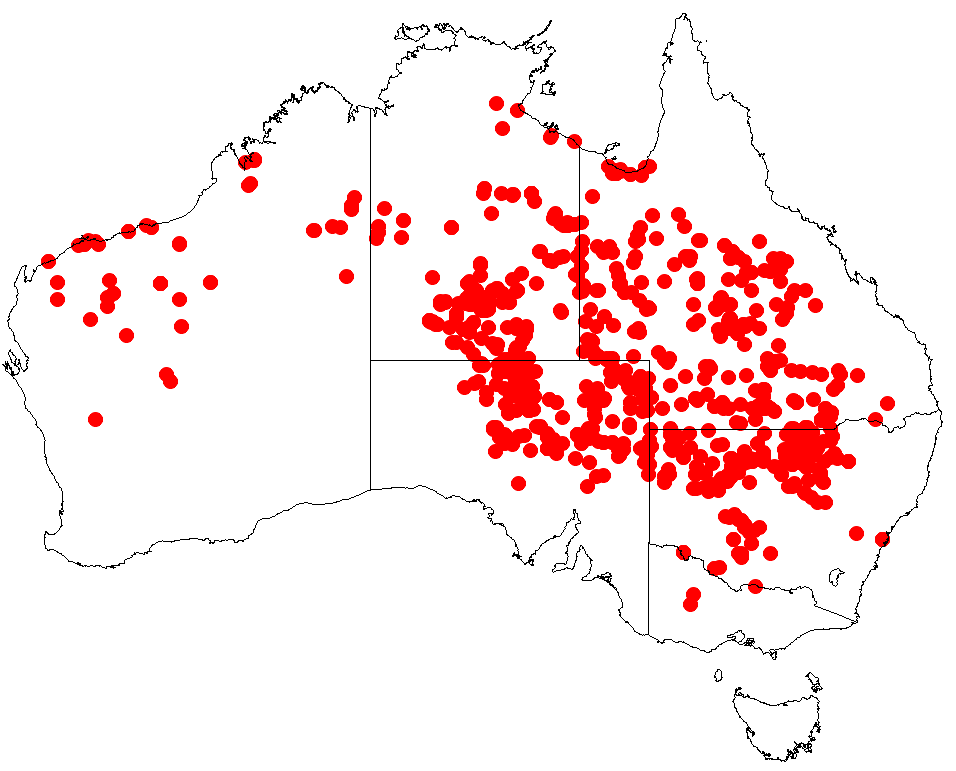
- Occurrence data from AVH

= Sclerolaena bicornis =

Species of shrub

Sclerolaena bicornis, commonly known as goathead burr, is a perennial shrub in the Amaranthaceae family, native to inland Australia, and found in Queensland, the Northern Territory, South Australia, New South Wales, and Western Australia The Walmajarri people of the Kimberley know the plant as Paka.

It was first described by John Lindley in 1838 in Thomas Mitchell's Three Expeditions into the interior of Eastern Australia. The species epithet, bicornis, is derived from Latin bis ("twice") and cornu (''horn"), and describes the plant as having two-horned burrs.

== Description ==
Sclerolaena bicornis is a complexly branched shrub, growing up to 50 cm high. The branches are white and woolly, with widely spaced, slender, semi-terete leaves. The flowers are solitary, with a densely woolly perianth. Stamens 5. The fruiting perianth is woody with a thick white woolly covering except for the final part of the spines.
