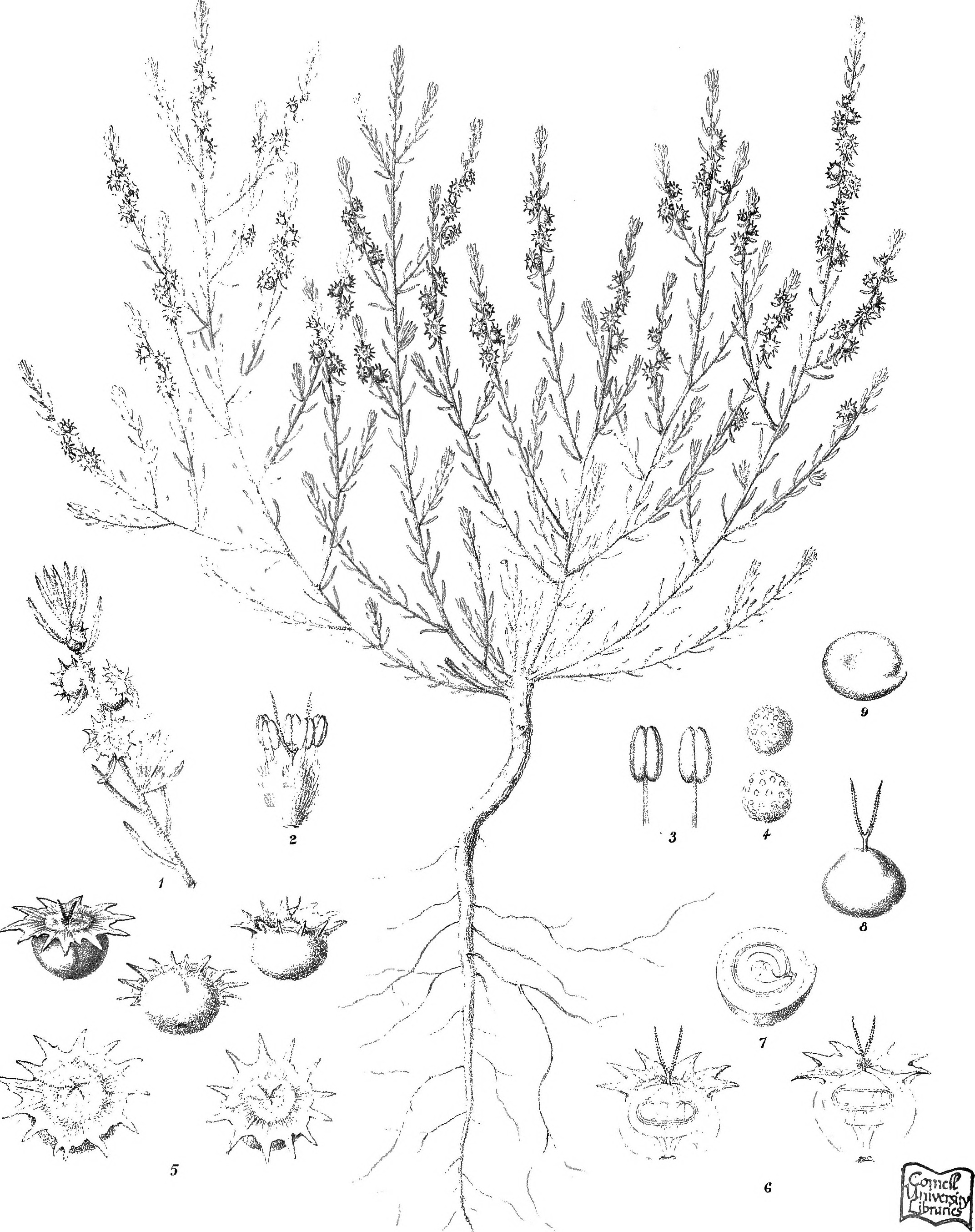

Scientific classification
- Kingdom: Plantae
- Clade: Tracheophytes
- Clade: Angiosperms
- Clade: Eudicots
- Order: Caryophyllales
- Family: Amaranthaceae
- Tribe: Camphorosmeae
- Genus: Sclerolaena
- Species: S. stelligera

Binomial name
- Sclerolaena stelligera (F.Muell.) S.W.L.Jacobs (1988)

Synonyms
- Austrobassia stelligera (F.Muell.) Ulbr. (1934); Bassia stelligera (F.Muell.) F.Muell. (1891); Echinopsilon stelligerus (F.Muell.) F.Muell. (1869); Kochia stelligera (F.Muell.) Benth. (1869); Maireana stelligera F.Muell. (1859); Stelligera endecaspinis A.J.Scott (1978)

= Sclerolaena stelligera =

Species of plant

Scleroleana stelligera is a species of flowering plant in the family Amaranthaceae. It subshrub native to eastern Australia, including parts of New South Wales, Queensland, South Australia, and Victoria.

It is a short-lived perennial which grows up to 30 cm high, with succulent leaves and hairy branches. It is widespread in drier interior areas with heavy soils.
