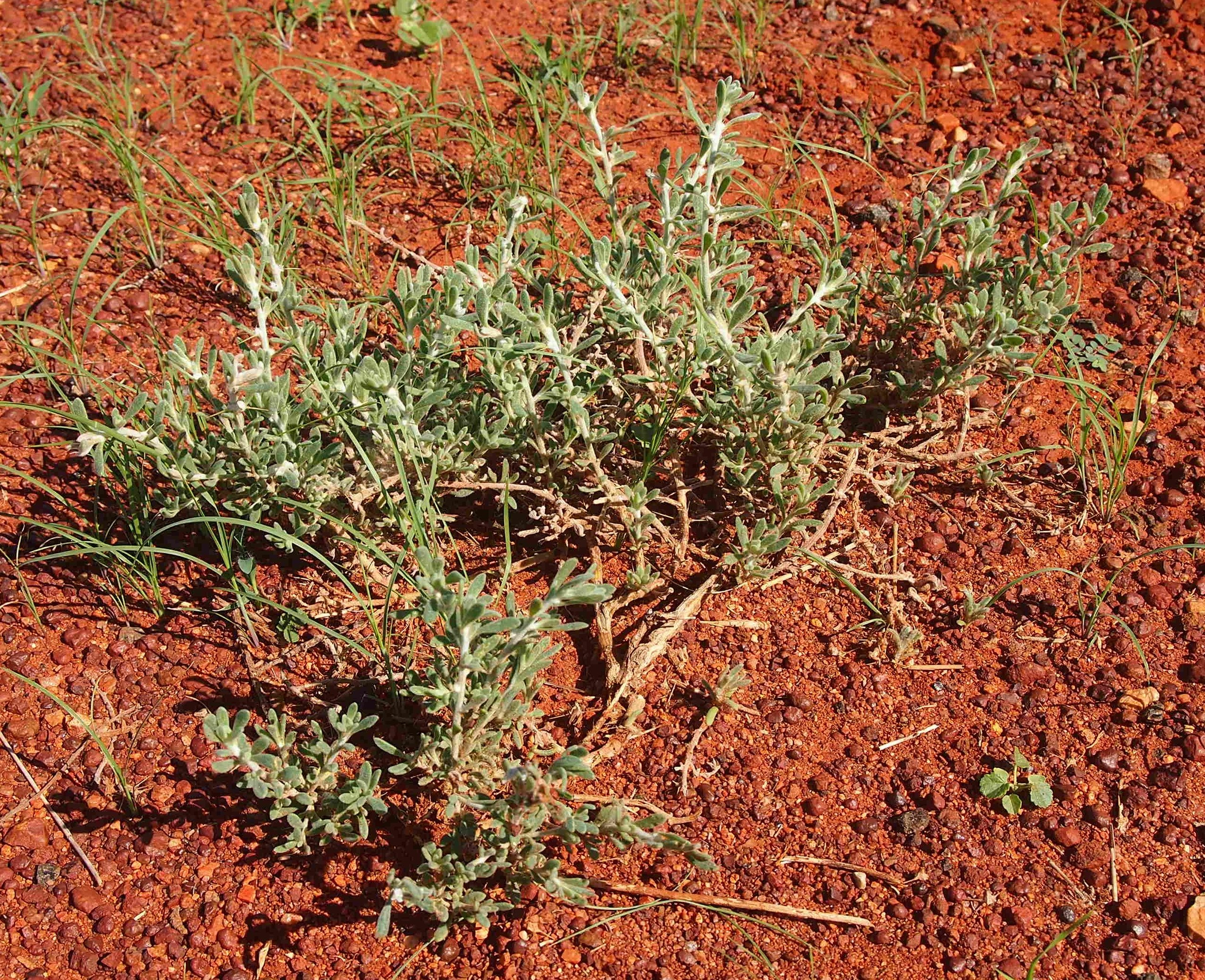

Scientific classification
- Kingdom: Plantae
- Clade: Tracheophytes
- Clade: Angiosperms
- Clade: Eudicots
- Order: Caryophyllales
- Family: Amaranthaceae
- Genus: Sclerolaena
- Species: S. birchii

Binomial name
- Sclerolaena birchii (F.Muell.) Domin

= Sclerolaena birchii =

Species of shrub

Sclerolaena birchii, commonly known as galvanised burr, is a perennial shrub native to inland Australia.

== Description ==
Sclerolaena birchii grows to around 1 m in height and diameter, branches are hairy with obovate to narrow-obovate leaves that can grow from 5- 15mm long. Leaves are shortly petiolate, flat and long. Fruiting perianth is hard, occurs obliquely, elliptic, 2-3mm in length, usually 5 spines present, divergent, the 3 abaxial spines are longer (6-15mm), the 2 adaxial spines usually 1-2mm long. Persistent hair bases cause the base of the spine creates a rough texture; seed is erect.

== Distribution and habitat ==
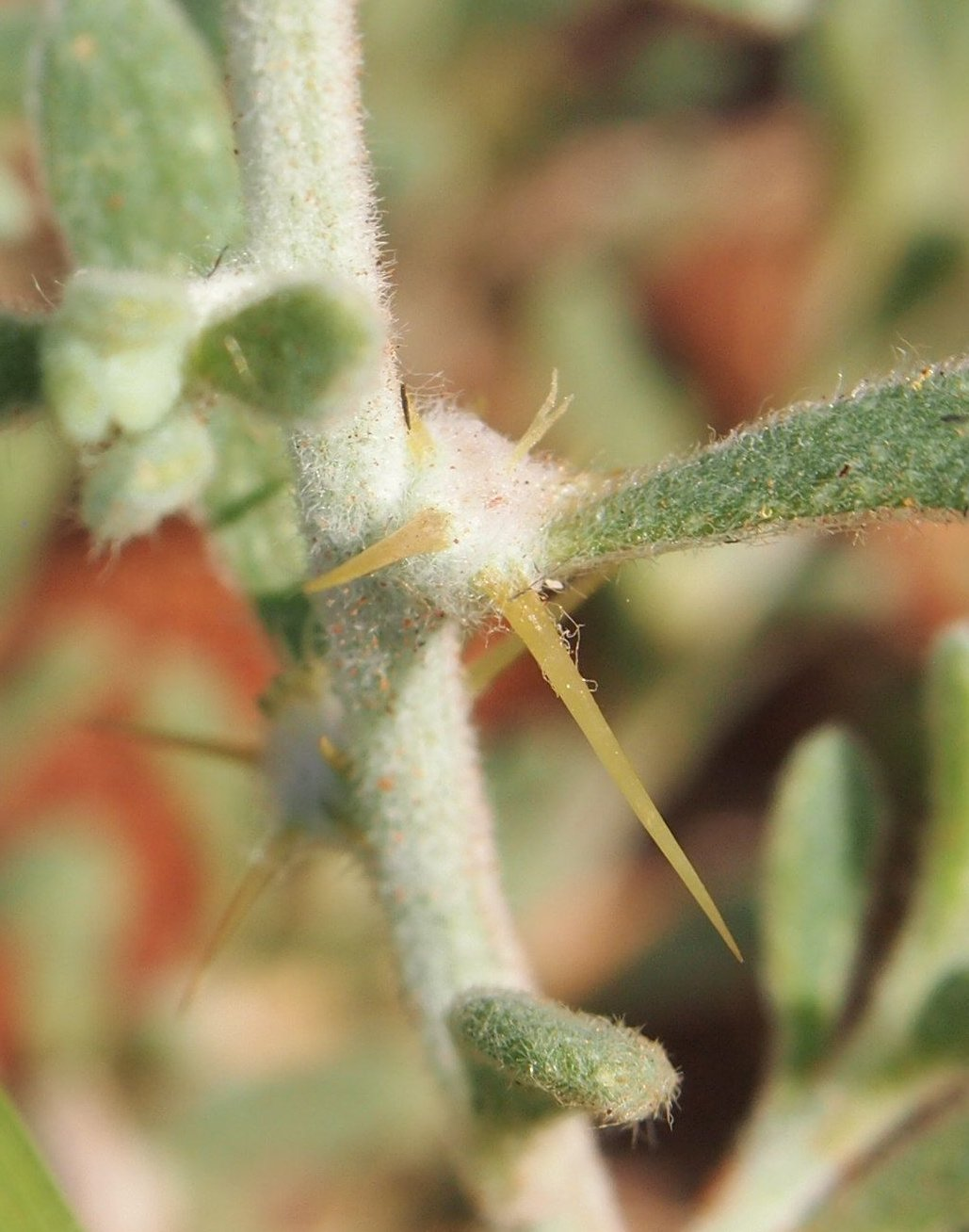
Spines of the Sclerolaena birchii fruit

Sclerolaena birchii can be found as isolated individuals or dense stands, where there are coarse sandy soils, or duplex soils. The galvanised burr often occurs near a few vegetation communities such as: bimble box, mulga and cypress pine. Sclerolaena birchii is distributed throughout western NSW and has been found in VIC and QLD. Sclerolaena birchii is considered to be near threatened in the Northern Territory, least concern in Queensland, and of least concern in Victoria.

== Taxonomy ==
Sclerolaena birchii is a member of Caryophyllales order which is estimated to contain around 12,500 species. A number of Caryophyllales species are characterised by extreme drought and cold tolerance. In some literature Sclerolaena birchii is classified under the Chenopodiaceae family and in other literature it is classified under the Amaranthaceae family. The relationship between the Chenopodiaceae and Amaranthaceae remains unclear. The plant belongs to the genus Sclerolaena, which comprises low shrubs and herbs and has around 66 species that occur in semi-arid regions of Australia.

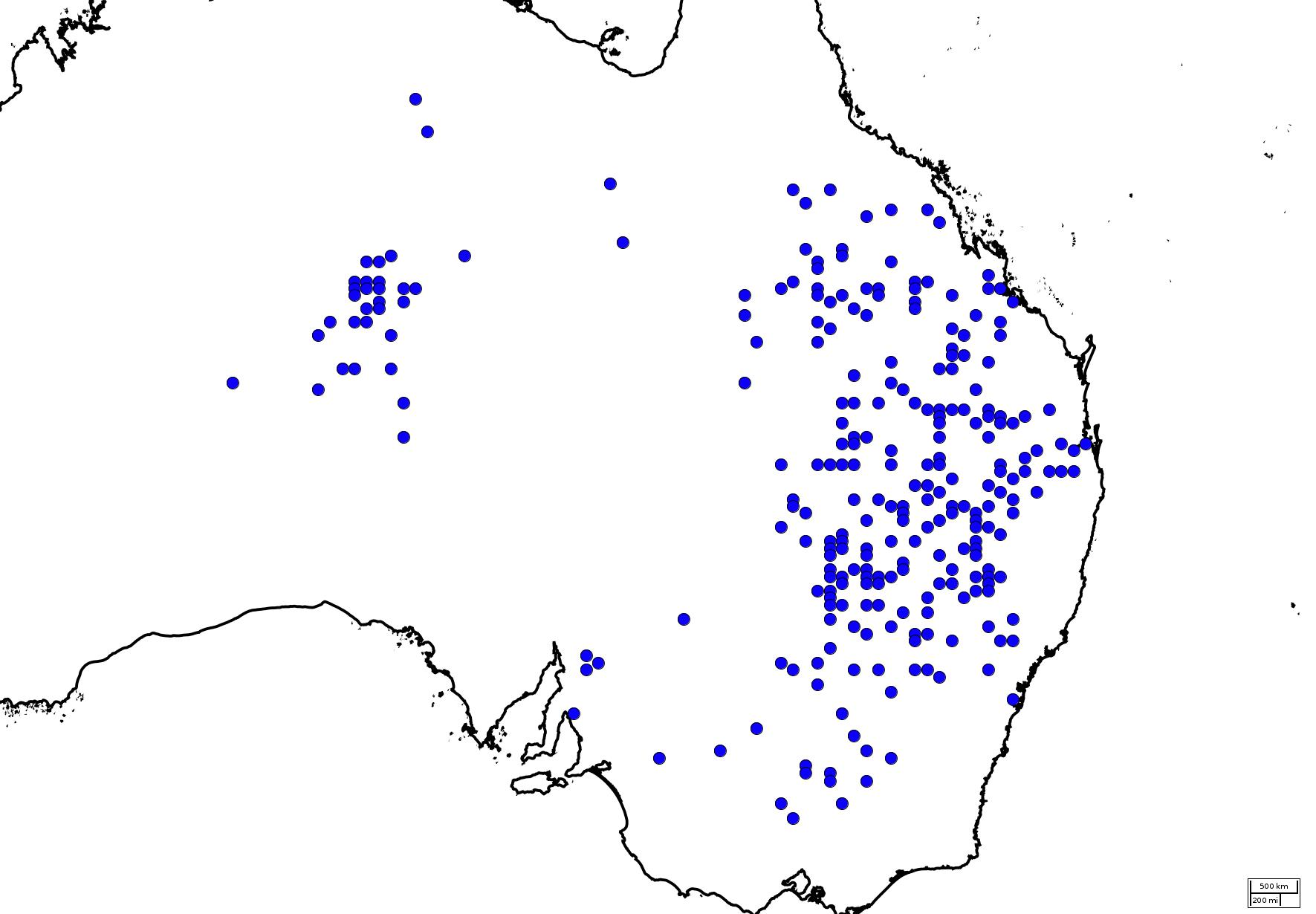
Recordings of Sclerolaena birchii from The Australasian Virtual Herbarium

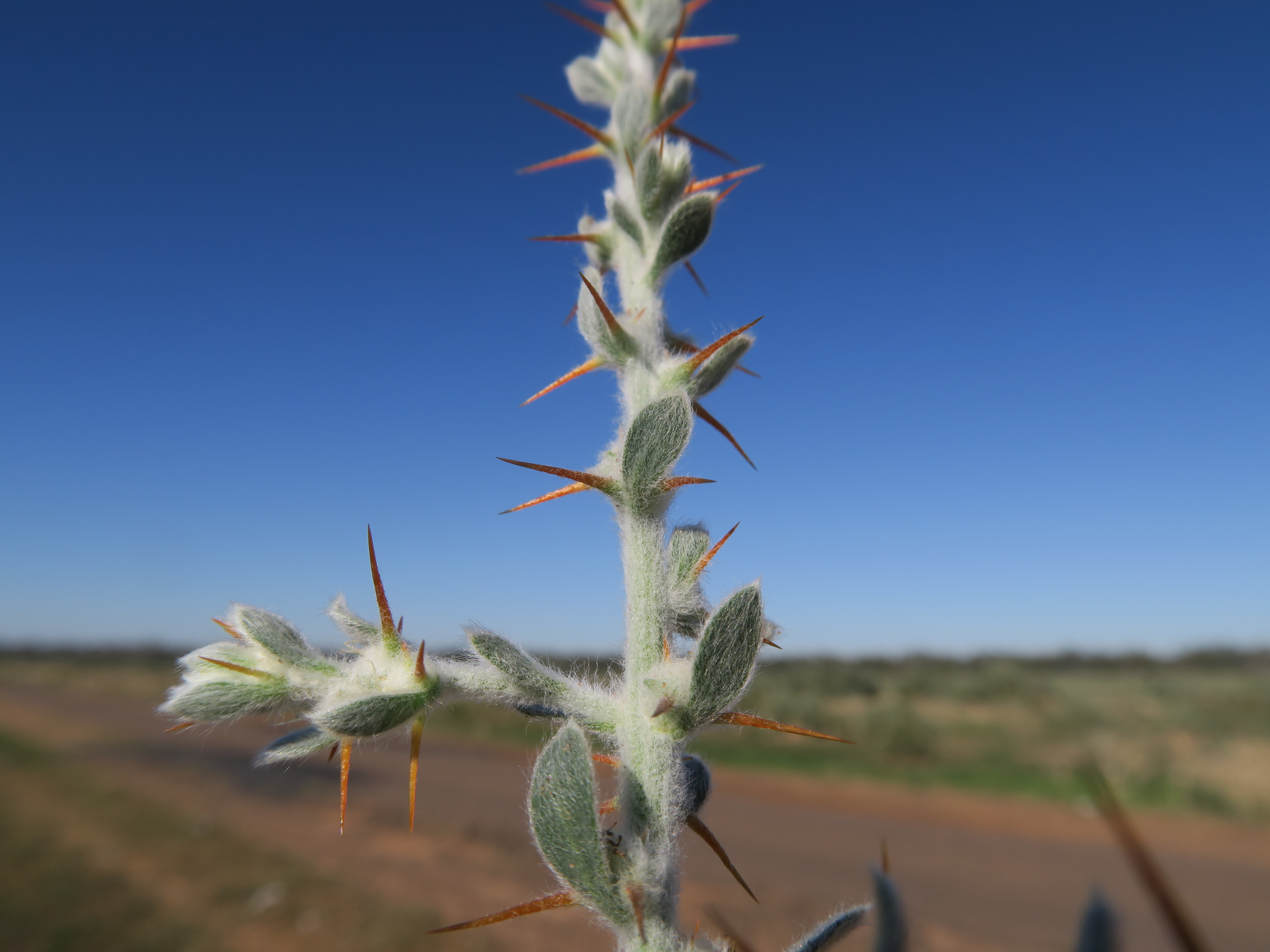
Sclerolaena birchii branch

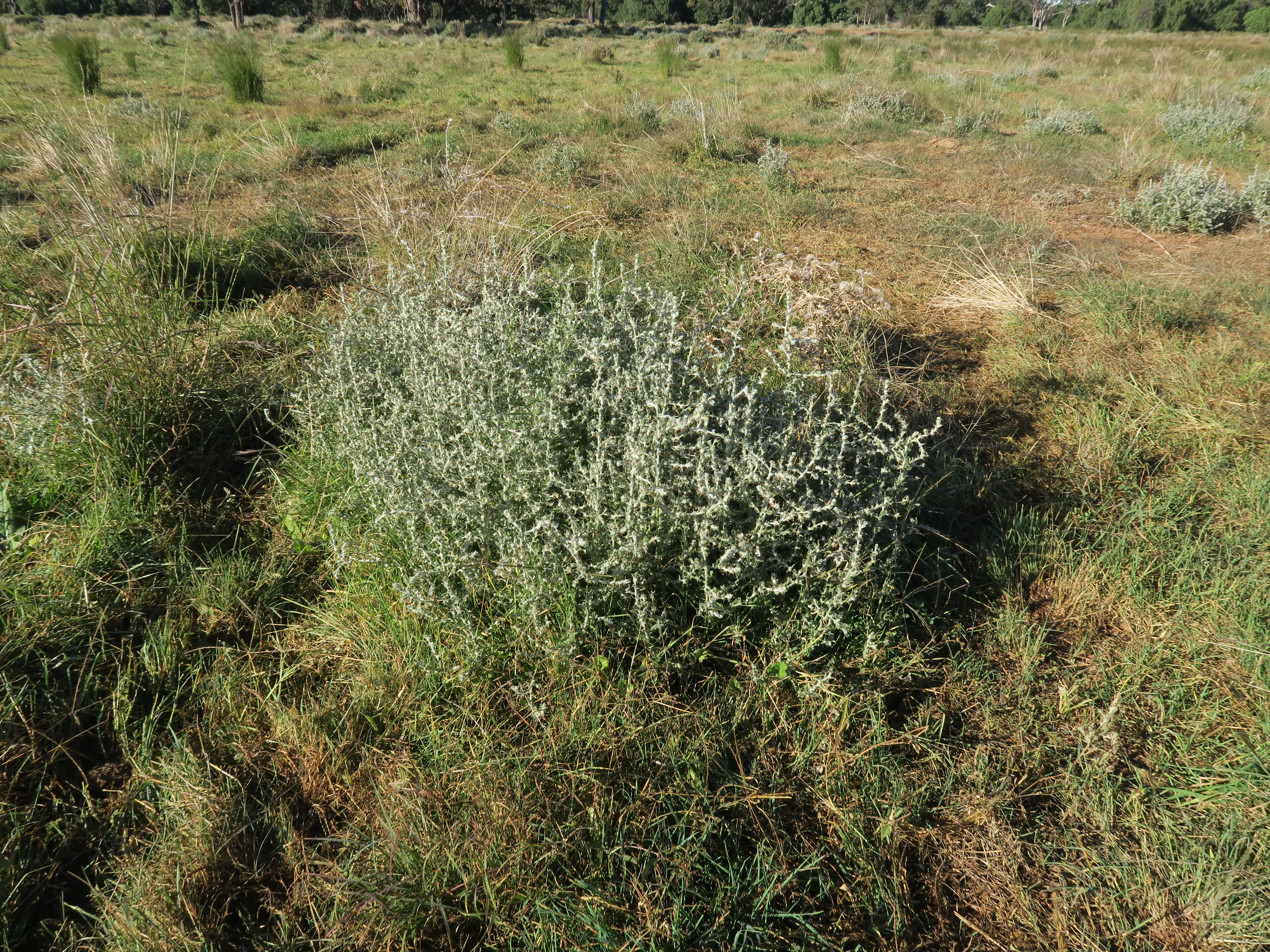
Sclerolaena birchii shrub
