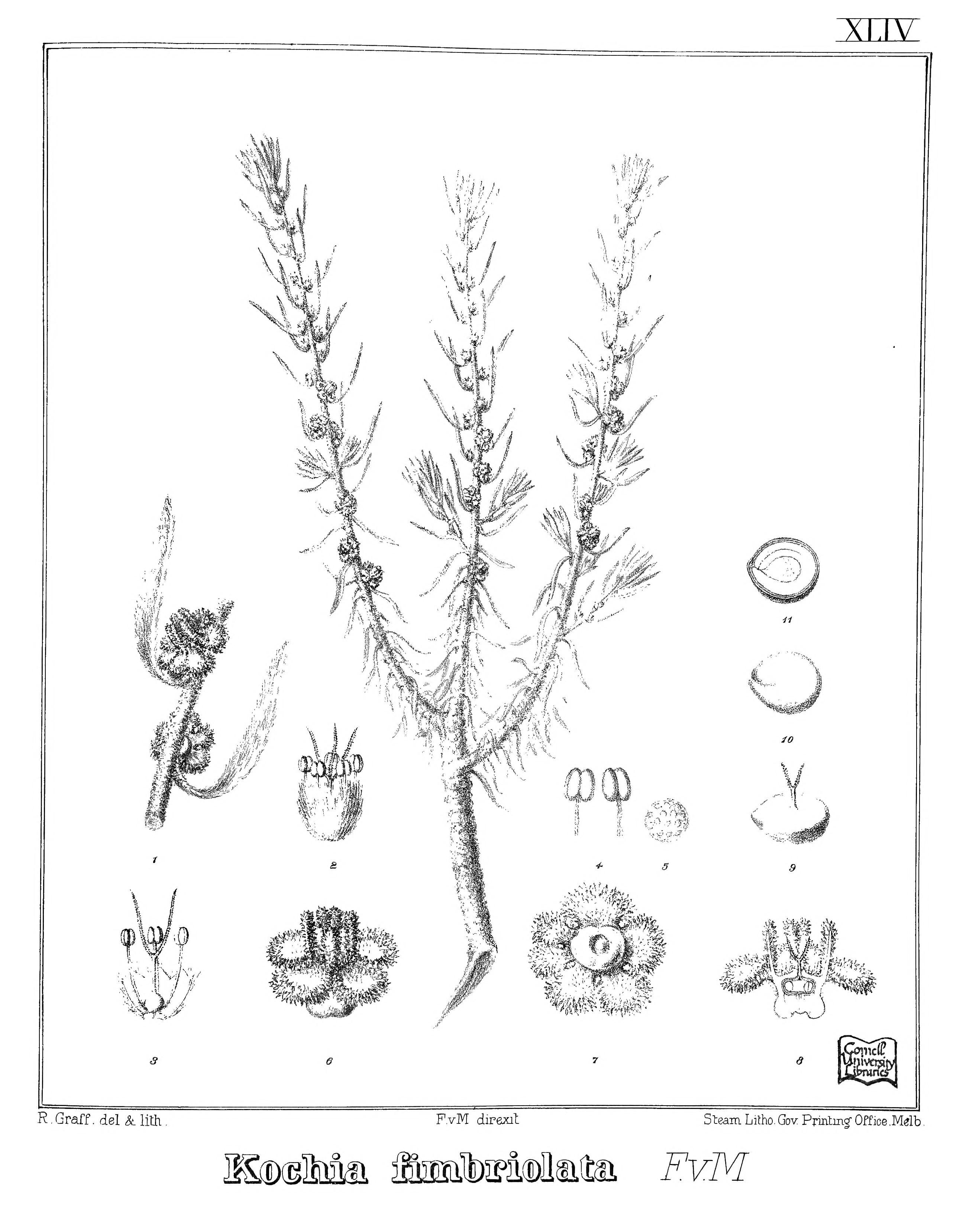
- Botanical illustration

Scientific classification
- Kingdom: Plantae
- Clade: Tracheophytes
- Clade: Angiosperms
- Clade: Eudicots
- Order: Caryophyllales
- Family: Amaranthaceae
- Genus: Sclerolaena
- Species: S. fimbriolata

Binomial name
- Sclerolaena fimbriolata (F.Muell.) A.J.Scott

Synonyms
- Bassia longifolia W.Fitzg.; Kochia fimbriolata F.Muell.

= Sclerolaena fimbriolata =

Species of plant in the amaranth family

Sclerolaena fimbriolata is a species of flowering plant in the family Amaranthaceae, native to central Western Australia. A small shrub, it is typically found growing on the edges of gypsum salt lakes.
