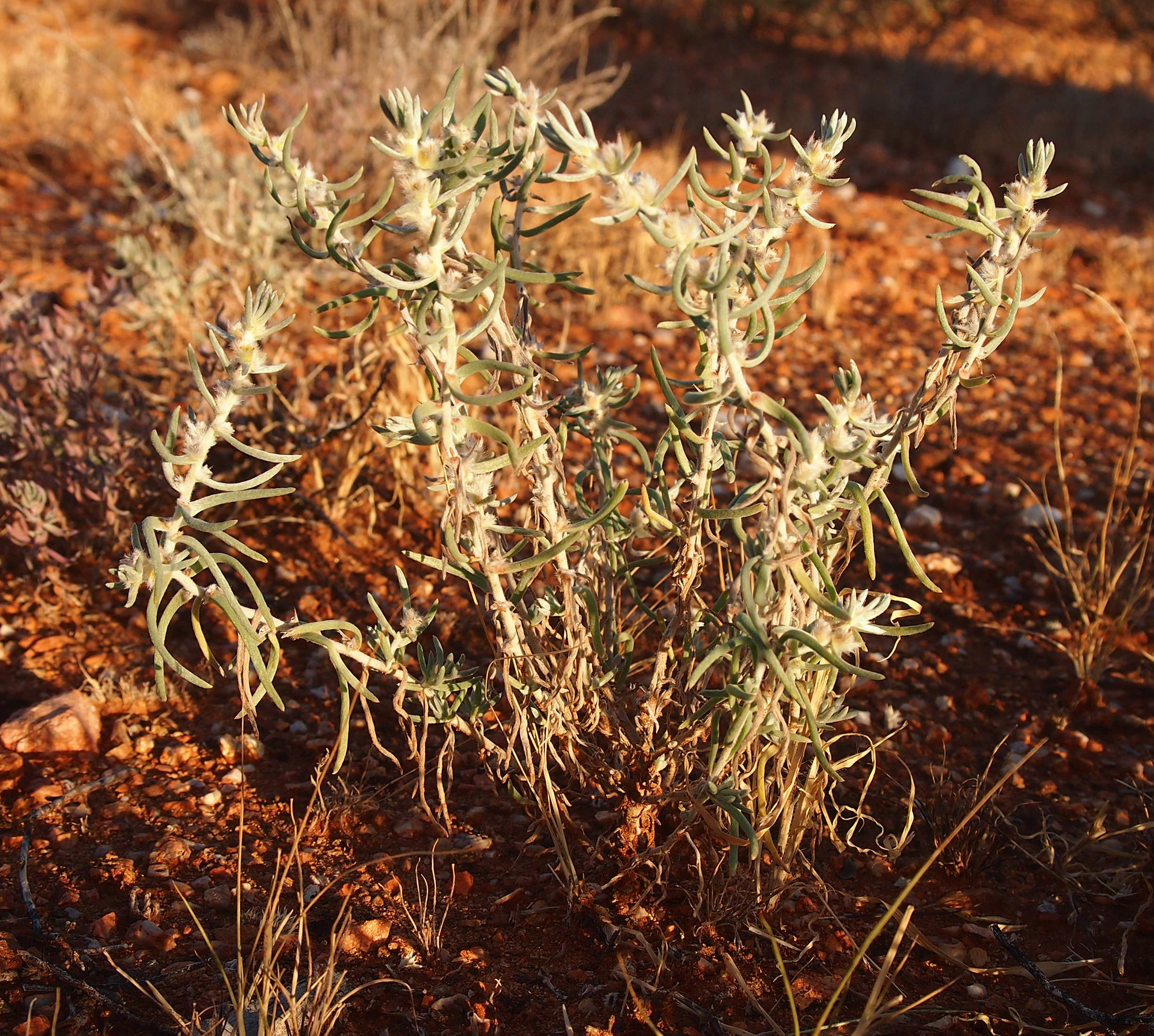

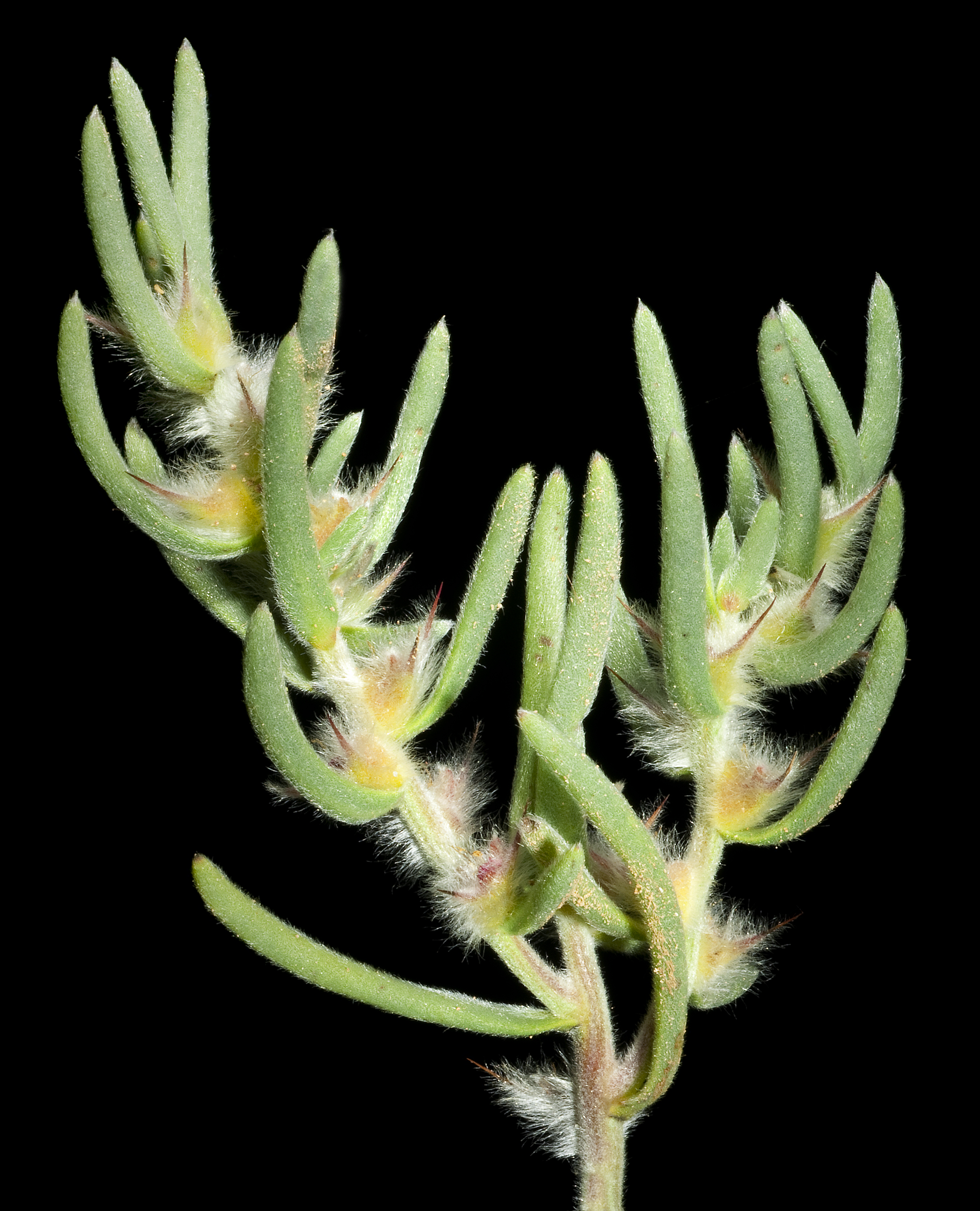

Scientific classification
- Kingdom: Plantae
- Clade: Tracheophytes
- Clade: Angiosperms
- Clade: Eudicots
- Order: Caryophyllales
- Family: Amaranthaceae
- Genus: Sclerolaena
- Species: S. eriacantha

Binomial name
- Sclerolaena eriacantha (F.Muell.) Ulbr.

= Sclerolaena eriacantha =

Species of shrub

Sclerolaena eriacantha, commonly known as tall bindii, is a perennial shrub native to inland Australia.
