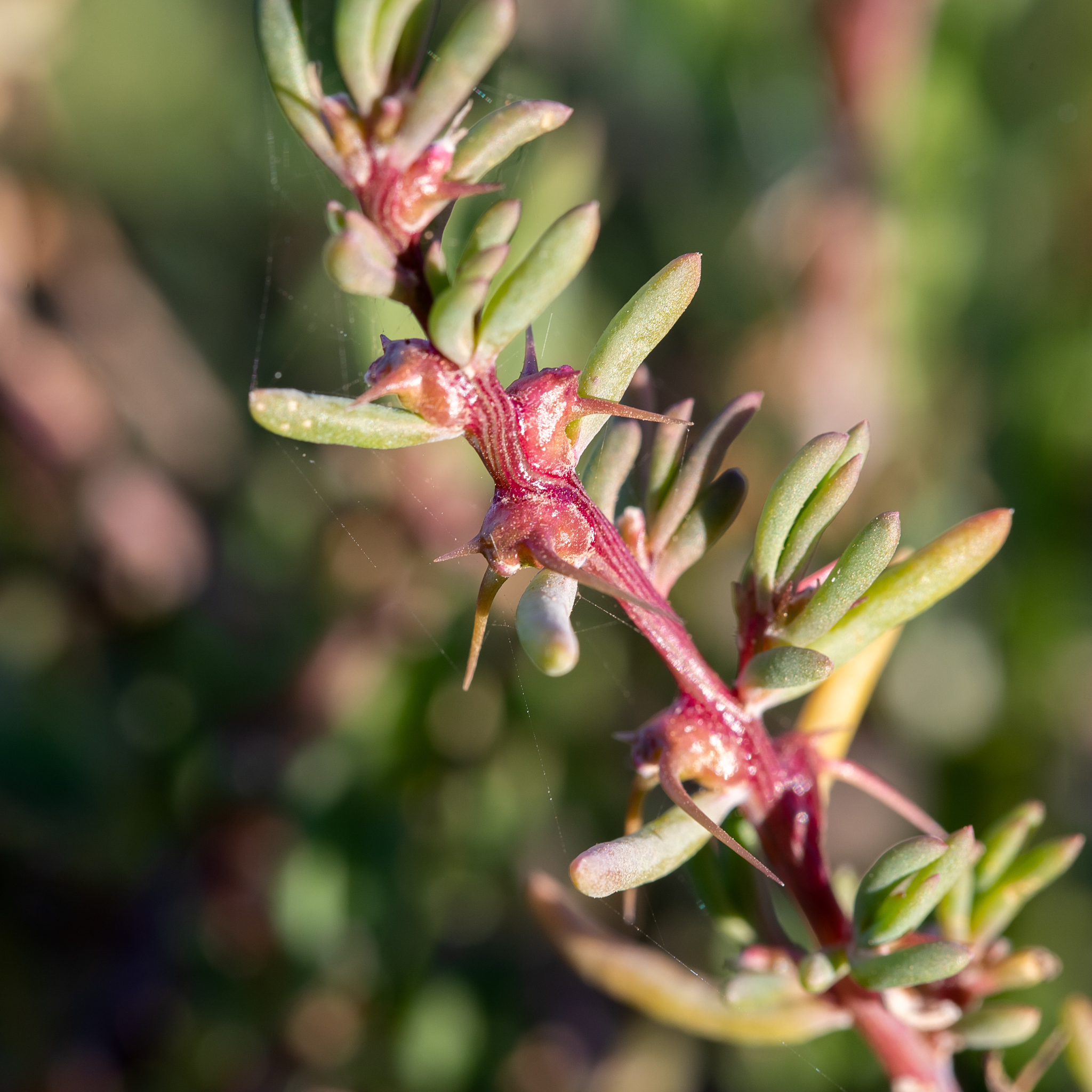

Scientific classification
- Kingdom: Plantae
- Clade: Tracheophytes
- Clade: Angiosperms
- Clade: Eudicots
- Order: Caryophyllales
- Family: Amaranthaceae
- Genus: Sclerolaena
- Species: S. tricuspis

Binomial name
- Sclerolaena tricuspis (F.Muell.) Ulbr.

Synonyms
- Anisacantha tricuspis F.Muell.; Bassia tricuspis (F.Muell.) R.H.Anderson; Chenolea tricuspis (F.Muell.) F.Muell.

= Sclerolaena tricuspis =

Species of plant in the amaranth family

Sclerolaena tricuspis (syn. Bassia tricuspis), the giant redburr or three-spined Bassia, is a species of flowering plant in the family Amaranthaceae, native to eastern Australia. A shrub reaching 1 m (3 ft), it has slender terete leaves.
