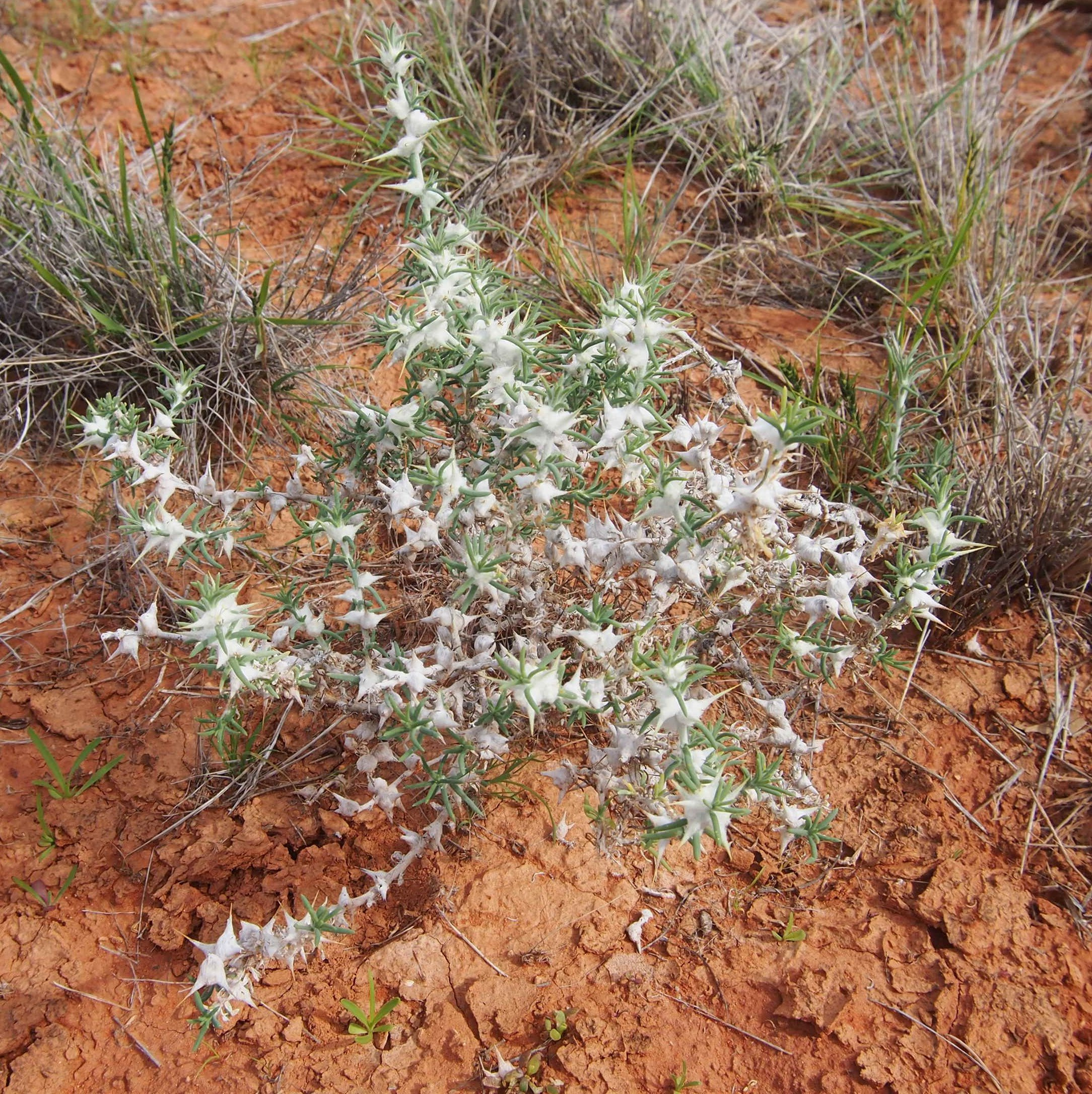
- Sclerolaena bicornis

Scientific classification
- Kingdom: Plantae
- Clade: Tracheophytes
- Clade: Angiosperms
- Clade: Eudicots
- Order: Caryophyllales
- Family: Amaranthaceae
- Subfamily: Camphorosmoideae
- Tribe: Camphorosmeae
- Genus: Sclerolaena; R.Br. (1810)

Species
- 78; see text

Synonyms
- Anisacantha R.Br. (1810); Austrobassia Ulbr. (1934); Coilocarpus Domin (1921); Cyrilwhitea Ising (1964); Kentropsis Moq. (1840); Sclerobassia Ulbr. (1934); Sclerochlamys F.Muell. (1858); Stelligera A.J.Scott (1978), nom. illeg.

= Sclerolaena =

Genus of flowering plants

Sclerolaena is a genus of flowering plants in the family Amaranthaceae. It includes 78 species of annuals or short-lived perennials native to Australia.

== Species ==
78 species are accepted.

- Sclerolaena aellenii (Ising) A.J.Scott
- Sclerolaena alata Paul G. Wilson
- Sclerolaena anisacanthoides Domin
- Sclerolaena articulata (J.M.Black) A.J.Scott
- Sclerolaena beaugleholei (Ising) A.J.Scott
- Sclerolaena bicornis Lindl.
- Sclerolaena bicuspis (F.Muell.) Domin
- Sclerolaena birchii (F. Muell.) Domin
- Sclerolaena blackei (Ising) A.J. Scott
- Sclerolaena brachyptera (F.Muell.) S.W.L.Jacobs
- Sclerolaena brevifolia (Ising) A.J.Scott
- Sclerolaena burbidgeae (Ising) A.J.Scott
- Sclerolaena calcarata (Ising) A.J.Scott
- Sclerolaena clavata (Ising) A.J.Scott
- Sclerolaena clelandii (Ising) A.J.Scott
- Sclerolaena constricta (Ising) A.J.Scott
- Sclerolaena convexula (R.H.Anderson) A.J.Scott
- Sclerolaena copleyi (Ising) A.J.Scott
- Sclerolaena cornishiana (F.Muell.) A.J.Scott
- Sclerolaena costata (R.H.Anderson) A.J.Scott
- Sclerolaena crenata (Ising) A.J.Scott
- Sclerolaena cristata (Ising) A.J.Scott
- Sclerolaena cuneata Paul G. Wilson
- Sclerolaena decurrens (J.M.Black) A.J.Scott
- Sclerolaena densiflora (W. Fitzg.) A.J. Scott
- Sclerolaena deserticola Paul G.Wilson
- Sclerolaena diacantha (Nees) Benth.
- Sclerolaena divaricata (R.Br.) Sm.
- Sclerolaena drummondii (Benth.) Domin
- Sclerolaena eriacantha (F. Muell.) Ulbr.
- Sclerolaena eurotioides (F. Muell.) A.J. Scott
- Sclerolaena everistiana (Ising) A.J.Scott
- Sclerolaena fimbriolata (F. Muell.) A.J. Scott
- Sclerolaena fontinalis Paul G.Wilson
- Sclerolaena forrestiana (F. Muell.) Domin
- Sclerolaena fusiformis Paul G. Wilson
- Sclerolaena gardneri (Ising) A.J.Scott
- Sclerolaena georgei (Ising) A.J.Scott
- Sclerolaena glabra Domin
- Sclerolaena globosa (Ising) A.J.Scott
- Sclerolaena holtiana (Ising) A.J.Scott
- Sclerolaena hostilis (Diels) Domin
- Sclerolaena intricata (R.H.Anderson) A.J.Scott
- Sclerolaena johnsonii (Ising) A.J.Scott
- Sclerolaena lanata (Ising) A.J.Scott
- Sclerolaena lanicuspis (F.Muell.) F.Muell. ex Benth.
- Sclerolaena limbata (J.M.Black) Ulbr.
- Sclerolaena longicuspis (F.Muell.) A.J.Scott
- Sclerolaena medicaginoides Paul G. Wilson
- Sclerolaena microcarpa (R.H.Anderson) A.J.Scott
- Sclerolaena minuta (Ising) A.J.Scott
- Sclerolaena muelleri (Benth.) A.J.Scott
- Sclerolaena muricata (Moq.) Domin
- Sclerolaena murrayae (Ising) A.J.Scott
- Sclerolaena napiformis Paul G. Wilson
- Sclerolaena nitida (Ising) A.J.Scott
- Sclerolaena obliquicuspis (R.H.Anderson) Ulbr.
- Sclerolaena oppositicuspis (Ising) A.J.Scott
- Sclerolaena parallelicuspis (R.H.Anderson) A.J.Scott
- Sclerolaena parviflora (Anderson) A.J. Scott
- Sclerolaena patenticuspis (R.H.Anderson) Ulbr.
- Sclerolaena × ramsayae (J.H.Willis) A.J.Scott
- Sclerolaena ramulosa (C.T.White) A.J.Scott
- Sclerolaena recurvicuspis (W.Fitzg.) Domin
- Sclerolaena scrymgeouriae (Ising) A.J.Scott
- Sclerolaena stelligera (F.Muell.) S.W.L.Jacobs
- Sclerolaena stylosa (Ising) A.J.Scott
- Sclerolaena symoniana (Ising) A.J.Scott
- Sclerolaena tatei (F.Muell.) A.J.Scott
- Sclerolaena tetracuspis (C.T.White) A.J.Scott
- Sclerolaena tetragona Paul G. Wilson
- Sclerolaena tricuspis (F.Muell.) Ulbr.
- Sclerolaena tridens (F. Muell.) Domin
- Sclerolaena tubata (R.H.Anderson) A.J.Scott
- Sclerolaena uniflora R.Br.
- Sclerolaena urceolata (Ising) A.J.Scott
- Sclerolaena ventricosa (J.M.Black) A.J.Scott
- Sclerolaena walkeri (C.T.White) A.J.Scott
