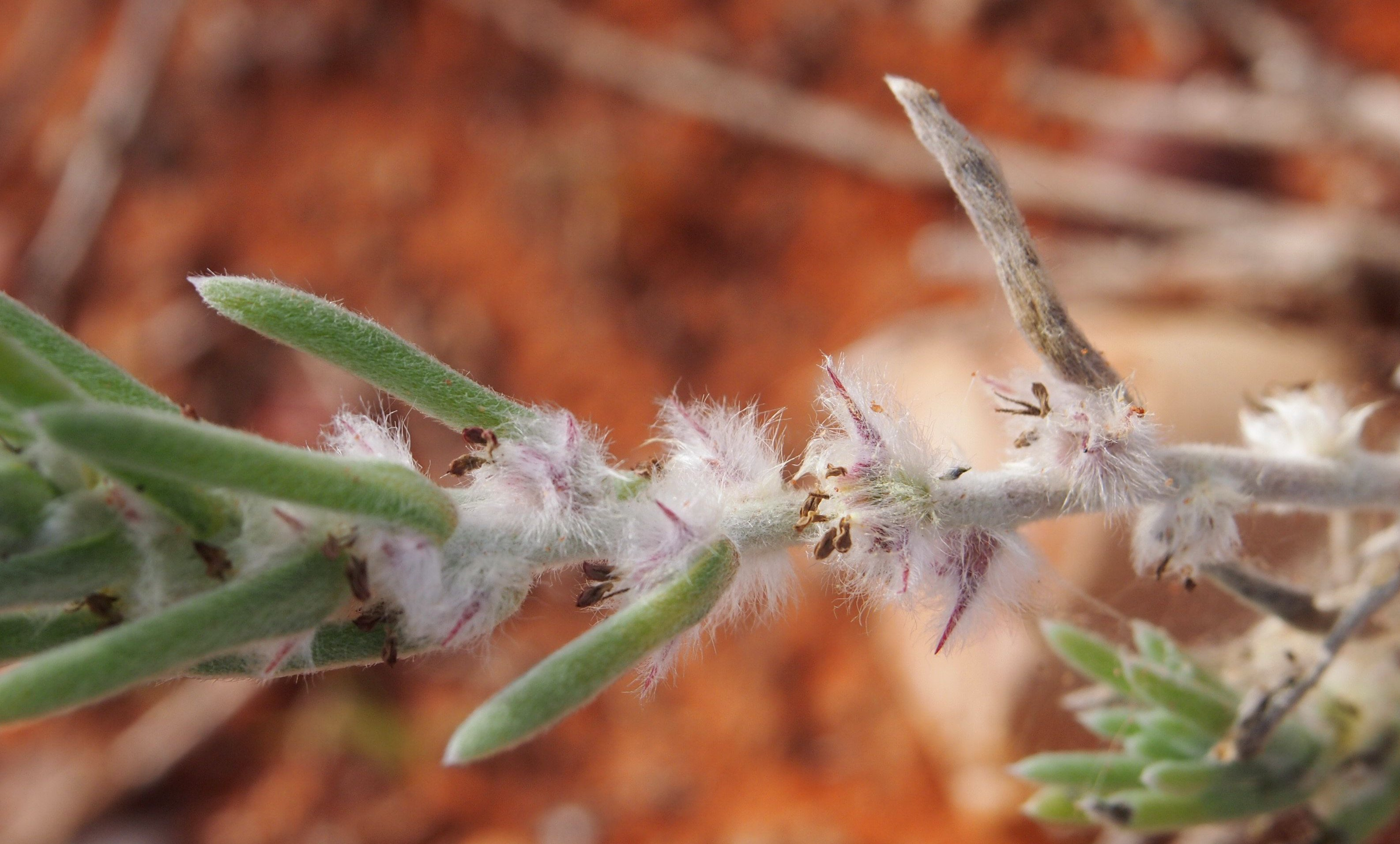
- Leaves and fruit
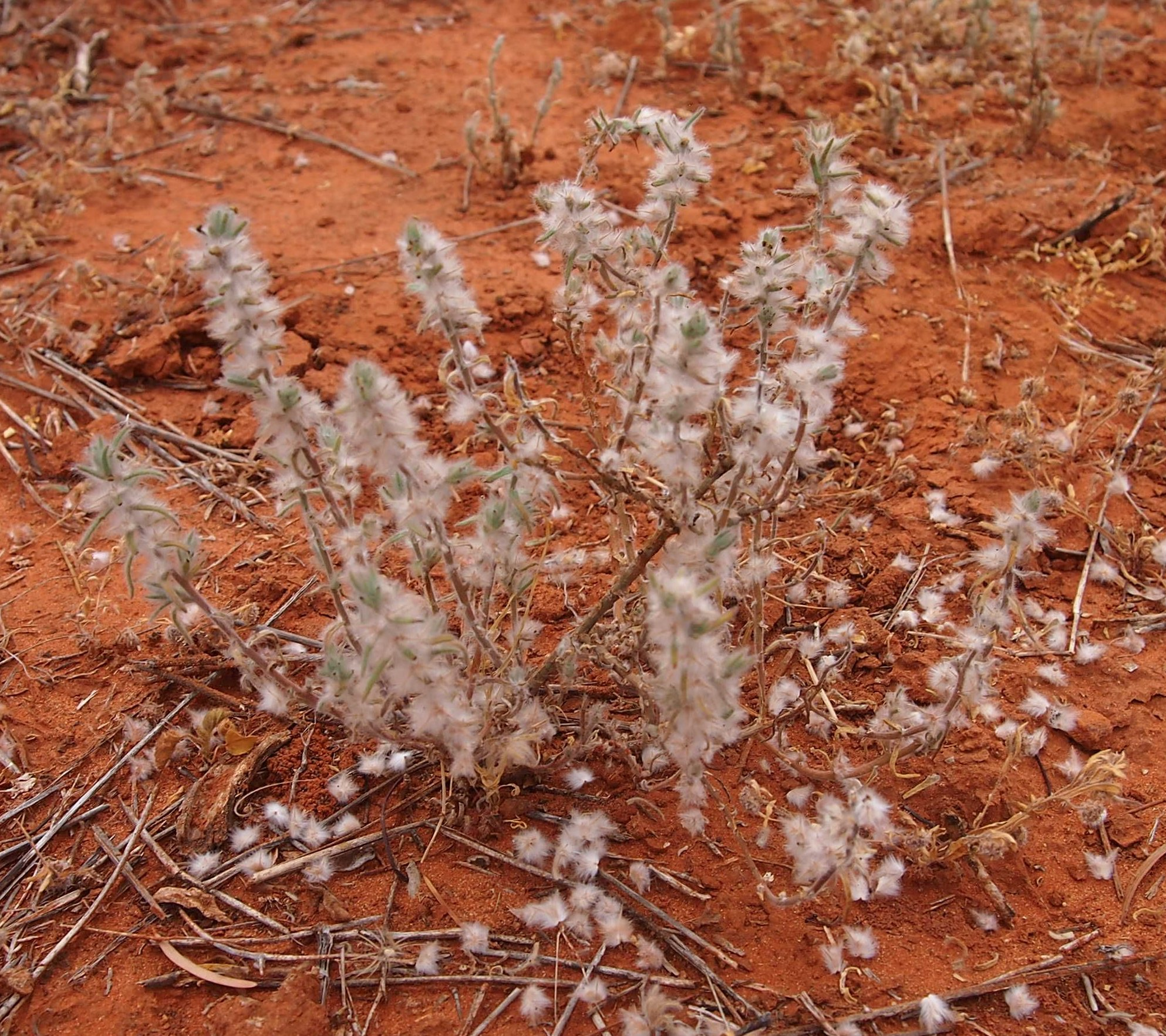
- In fruit

Scientific classification
- Kingdom: Plantae
- Clade: Tracheophytes
- Clade: Angiosperms
- Clade: Eudicots
- Order: Caryophyllales
- Family: Amaranthaceae
- Genus: Sclerolaena
- Species: S. lanicuspis

Binomial name
- Sclerolaena lanicuspis (F.Muell.) F.Muell. ex Benth.

Synonyms
- Anisacantha lanicuspis F.Muell.; Bassia lanicuspis (F.Muell.) F.Muell.

= Sclerolaena lanicuspis =

Species of plant in the amaranth family

Sclerolaena lanicuspis, the spinach-burr or copper-burr, is a species of flowering plant in the family Amaranthaceae, native to Australia (except Tasmania). A woody perennial reaching 25 cm (10 in), it has tomentose branches and semiterete leaves.
