= Sclerolaena muricata =

Scientific classification
- Kingdom: Plantae
- Clade: Tracheophytes
- Clade: Angiosperms
- Clade: Eudicots
- Order: Caryophyllales
- Family: Amaranthaceae
- Genus: Sclerolaena
- Species: S. muricata

Binomial name
- Sclerolaena muricata (Moq.) Domin

Species of shrub

Sclerolaena muricata, commonly known as black rolypoly, is a perennial shrub native to eastern and central Australia.
