= Andrew John Scott (botanist) =

British botanist (1950)

- Born: 1950 (age 75–76); Torquay, Devon
- Known for: Botany; Taxonomy
- Spouse: Pamela Lacy
- Scientific career
- Institutions: Royal Botanic Gardens, Kew
- Author abbrev. (botany): A.J.Scott

Andrew John Scott (born 1950, Torquay) is a British botanist.

He attended St Peter's School, Southbourne (1961-1969), where he was active in their fencing club. He went on to study Biology at York University (B.A., 1972) followed by an M.Sc. in Pure and Applied Plant Taxonomy at Reading University (1973), with a project on "Lotus section Pedrosia in the Canary Islands". In 1976 he was awarded a Ph.D. from Birmingham University for the thesis "The Systematics of the Chenopodiaceae" using Numerical taxonomy.

He worked (1976-1978) as a taxonomist at the Herbarium, Kew Gardens, working on Myrtaceae. Later he worked on the Flora of the Mascarenes project at Kew. Elected a member of the Linnean Society of London in 1976. He has published articles on the classification of the Chenopodiaceae and Myrtaceae.

He was awarded a Diploma in Management Studies (DMS) from Thames Valley College in 1990 and worked in Information technology at KPOS Computer Systems and Swan Retail.

Gossia scottiana N.Snow is named for him.

== Selected publications ==
1990. Myrtacées. In: Bosser J, Cadet T, Guého J, Marais W (Eds) Flore des Mascareignes: La Réunion, Maurice, Rodrigues 92. MSIRI, Port Louis, ORSTOM, Paris, Royal Botanical Gardens, London.OCLC 9896555

1990. Wild Flowers of Andorra. Quarterly Bulletin of the Alpine Garden Society, Vol.58(4):374-379.
