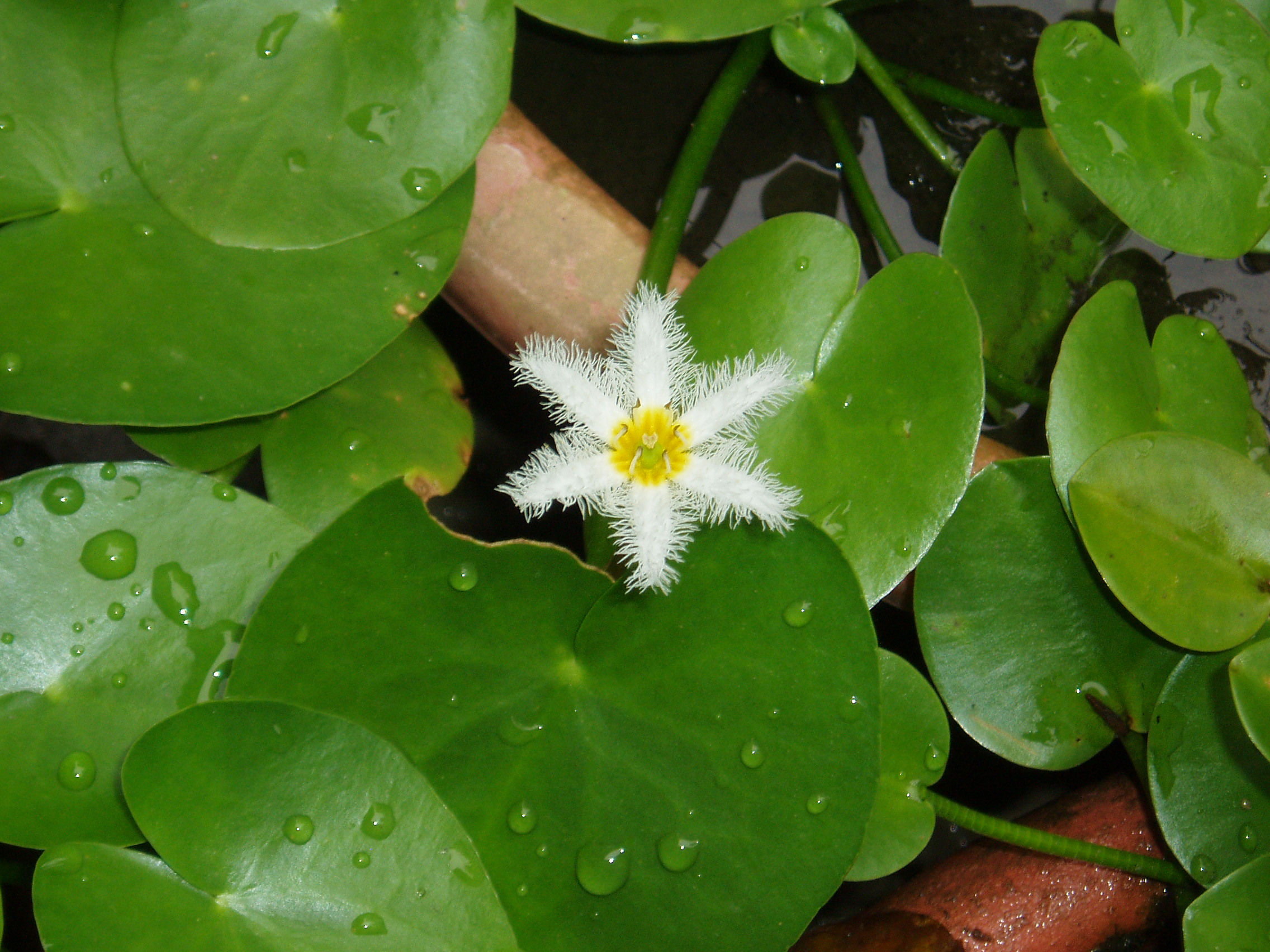
- A flower with six, rather than five petals

Conservation status
- Least Concern (IUCN 3.1)

Scientific classification
- Kingdom: Plantae
- Clade: Tracheophytes
- Clade: Angiosperms
- Clade: Eudicots
- Clade: Asterids
- Order: Asterales
- Family: Menyanthaceae
- Genus: Nymphoides
- Species: N. indica

Binomial name
- Nymphoides indica (L.) Kuntze

= Nymphoides indica =

Species of aquatic plant

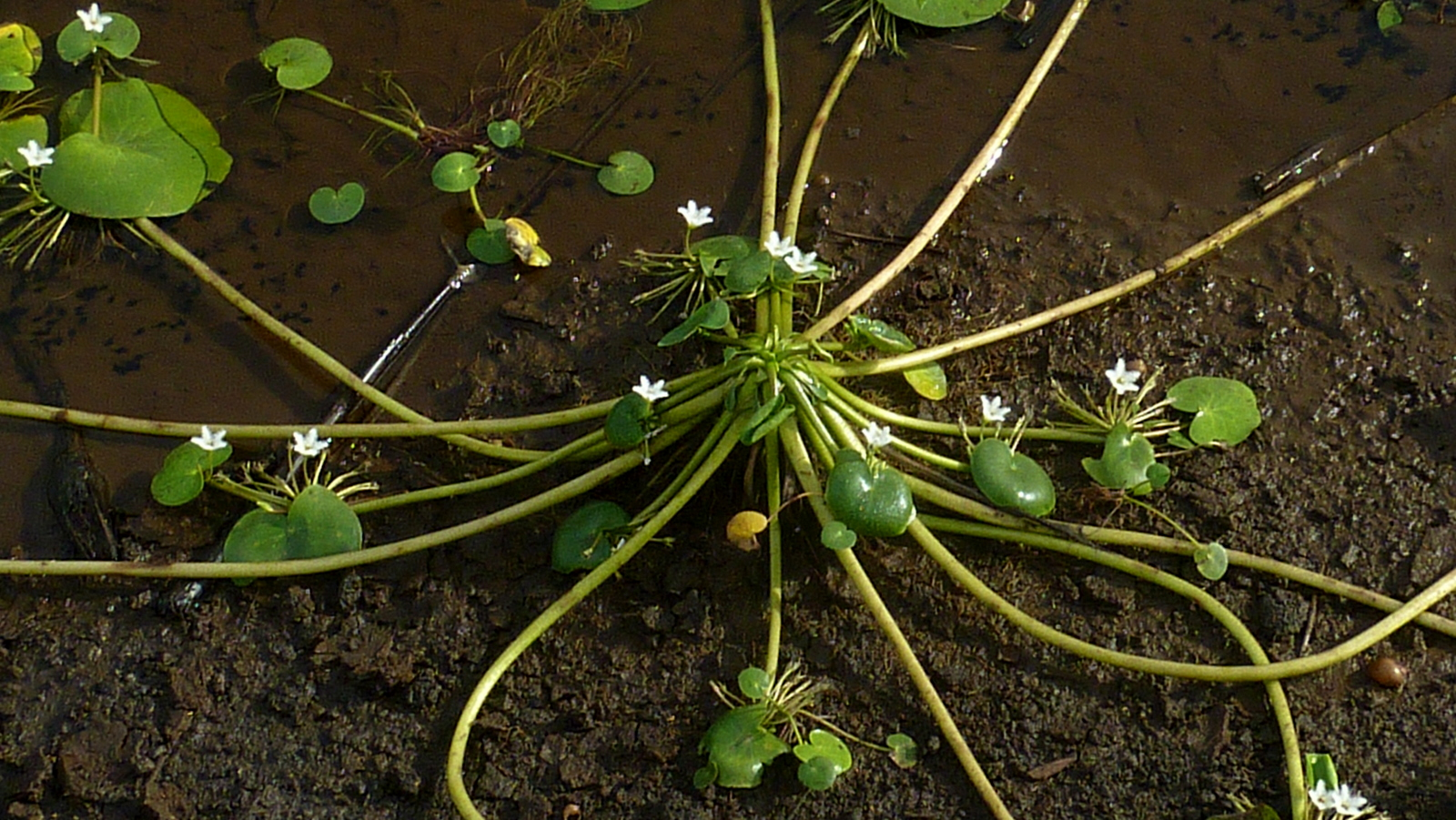
Plant habit

Nymphoides indica is an aquatic plant in the Menyanthaceae, native to tropical areas around the world. It is sometimes cultivated, and has become a minor weed in Florida, where it resembles the native Nymphoides aquatica. Common names include banana plant, robust marshwort, and water snowflake;

== Description ==
Nymphoides indica spreads by rhizomes, forming clusters of leaves, with clustered white flowers about 1 cm across. The flowers are sometimes described as having five petals, but can have more.
