= Nymphoides macrospermum =

Conservation status
- Critically Endangered (IUCN 3.1)

Scientific classification
- Kingdom: Plantae
- Clade: Tracheophytes
- Clade: Angiosperms
- Clade: Eudicots
- Clade: Asterids
- Order: Asterales
- Family: Menyanthaceae
- Genus: Nymphoides
- Species: N. macrospermum

Binomial name
- Nymphoides macrospermum Vasud.Nair

Species of flowering plant

Nymphoides macrospermum is a critically endangered aquatic plant of the family Menyanthaceae endemic to Alwaye in Kerala, India. It is an annual herb which has been observed in paddy fields, lagoons and slowly flowing streams. It is dioecious, with male and female flowers on separate plants.
