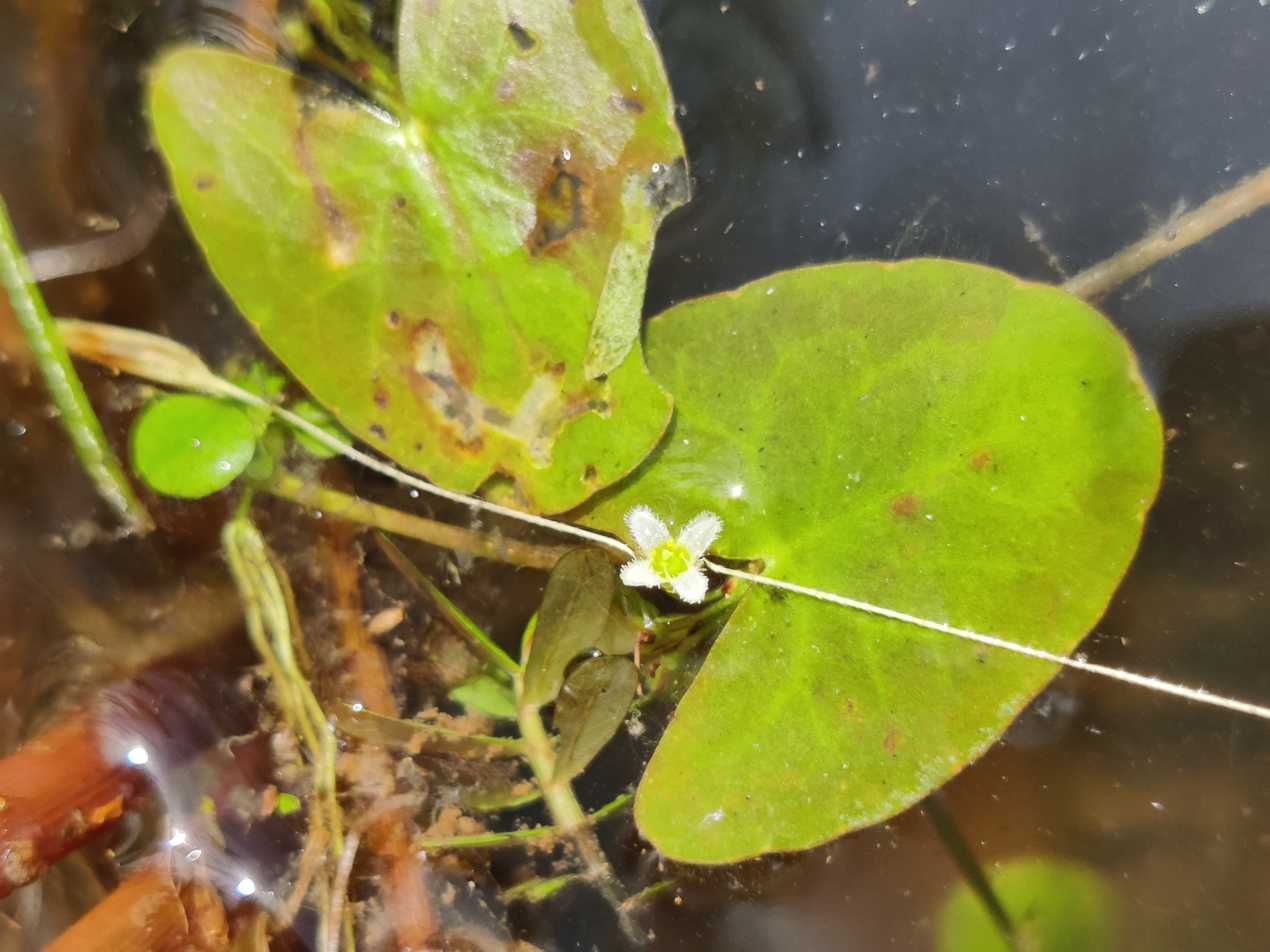

Conservation status
- Least Concern (IUCN 3.1)

Scientific classification
- Kingdom: Plantae
- Clade: Tracheophytes
- Clade: Angiosperms
- Clade: Eudicots
- Clade: Asterids
- Order: Asterales
- Family: Menyanthaceae
- Genus: Nymphoides
- Species: N. parvifolia

Binomial name
- Nymphoides parvifolia Kuntze

= Nymphoides parvifolia =

Species of plant

Nymphoides parvifolia (also known as Nymphoides parviflora), is an aquatic perennial plant species of floating aquatic plants native to tropical Asia to northern Australia.

== Description ==
Floating leaves pale green –brownish green with pinkish tinge; seed surface tuberculated. The flowers are bisexual, 3-4 white petals with yellow throat and toothed edges.
