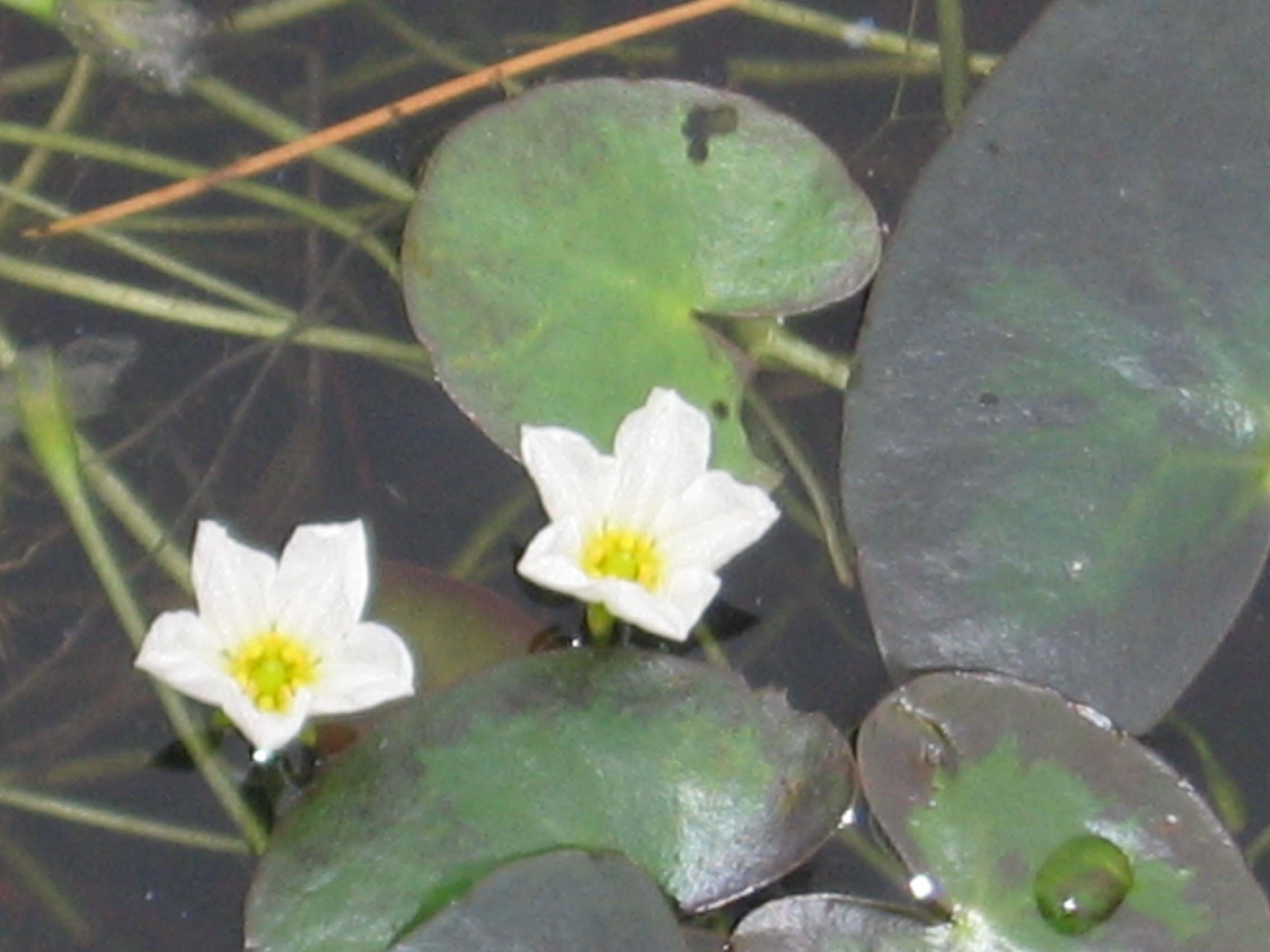

Conservation status
- Least Concern (IUCN 3.1)

Scientific classification
- Kingdom: Plantae
- Clade: Tracheophytes
- Clade: Angiosperms
- Clade: Eudicots
- Clade: Asterids
- Order: Asterales
- Family: Menyanthaceae
- Genus: Nymphoides
- Species: N. cordata

Binomial name
- Nymphoides cordata (Elliott) Fernald

= Nymphoides cordata =

Species of plant

Nymphoides cordata, the little floatingheart, is a species of floating aquatic plant native to eastern North America.

== Description ==
The floating leaves are 30–70 mm long and cordate (or heart-shaped), with smooth, purple lower surfaces. The flowers are white with five petals.

== Range ==
Little floatingheart grows in eastern North America, from the eastern provinces of Canada down to Maryland, and then reoccurs from the Carolinas down to Louisiana.

== Habitat ==
Freshwater ponds, lakes, and slow-moving rivers and streams.
