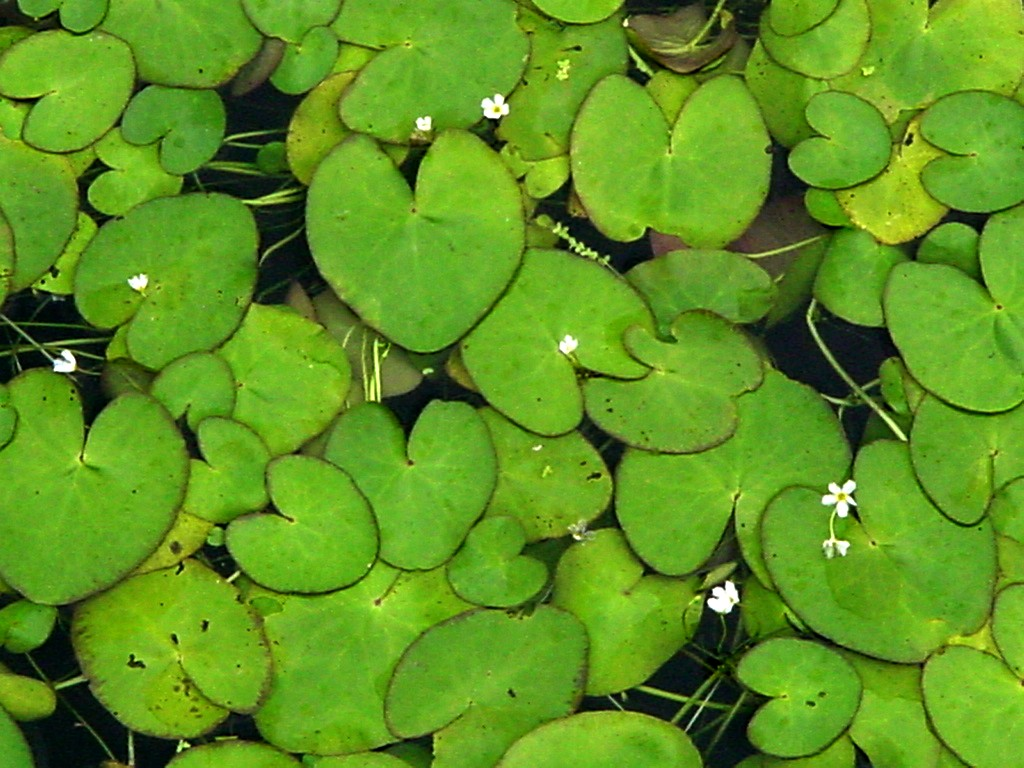

Scientific classification
- Kingdom: Plantae
- Clade: Tracheophytes
- Clade: Angiosperms
- Clade: Eudicots
- Clade: Asterids
- Order: Asterales
- Family: Menyanthaceae
- Genus: Nymphoides
- Species: N. hydrophylla

Binomial name
- Nymphoides hydrophylla (Lour.) Kuntze, 1891

Synonyms
- Limnanthemum cristatum (Roxb.) Griseb.; Nymphoides cristata H.Hara, 1937

= Nymphoides hydrophylla =

Species of aquatic plant

Nymphoides hydrophylla, commonly known as crested floating-heart, is an aquatic plant of the family Menyanthaceae native to Taiwan. It has cordate floating leaves that support a lax inflorescence of dainty white flowers with fringed petal margins. Its slim stem (spear) is edible, and is used as vegetable in Taiwan, mostly produced at Meinong District, Kaohsiung.

Flowers of N. hydrophylla are gynodioecious. The fruit is a capsule bearing many flattened seeds.

The plants are commonly sold for use in ornamental water gardens. Outside their native range they can escape cultivation and become nuisance weeds, particularly in Florida. They are not killed by freezing, and have been reported in Lake Marion, South Carolina.

== Gallery ==
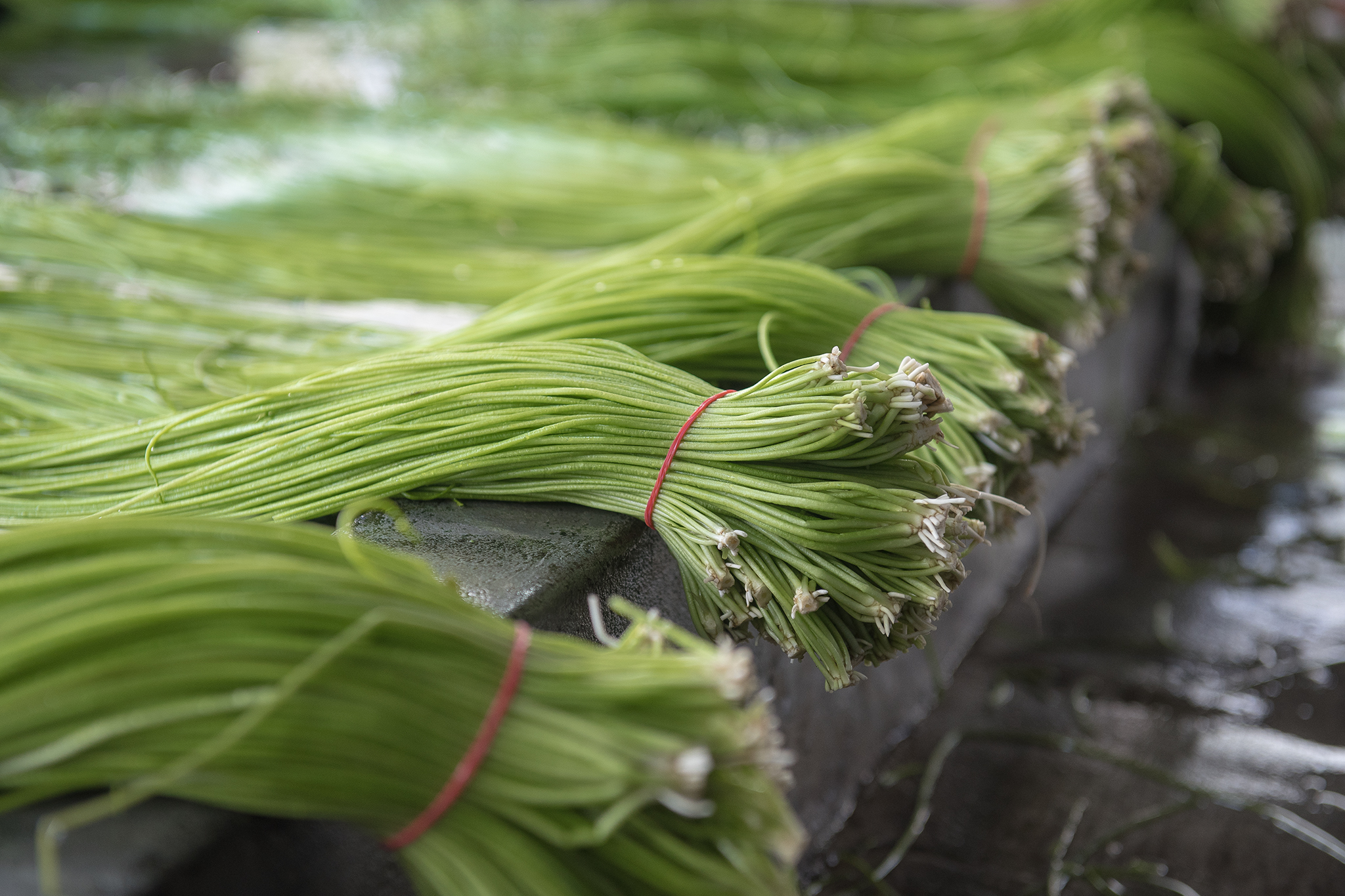
Bundled at a factory in Meinong District

Shui lian cai prepared at a restaurant in Meinong District
