= Nymphoides spinulosperma =

Scientific classification
- Kingdom: Plantae
- Clade: Tracheophytes
- Clade: Angiosperms
- Clade: Eudicots
- Clade: Asterids
- Order: Asterales
- Family: Menyanthaceae
- Genus: Nymphoides
- Species: N. spinulosperma

Binomial name
- Nymphoides spinulosperma Aston

Species of aquatic plant

Nymphoides spinulosperma, commonly known as marbled marshwort, is an aquatic plant of the family Menyanthaceae native to eastern Australia. It was described in 1997.

Nymphoides spinulosperma is a perennial herb with stems up to 1.5 cm (0.6 in) long. The oval to circular leaves are 2.5–12 cm long by 2–11 cm wide, with a heart-shaped (cordate) base. There is a pinkspot at the base of the leaf where it attaches to the petiole. The flowers appear in summer and autumn, up to 5.5 cm across and bright yellow with fringed petals.

It has been recorded from isolated waterways in Victoria, New South Wales and Queensland. Its habitat is slowly-moving or still water to 1 m in depth.

Not often seen in cultivation, it is readily grown in ponds and aquatic gardens.
