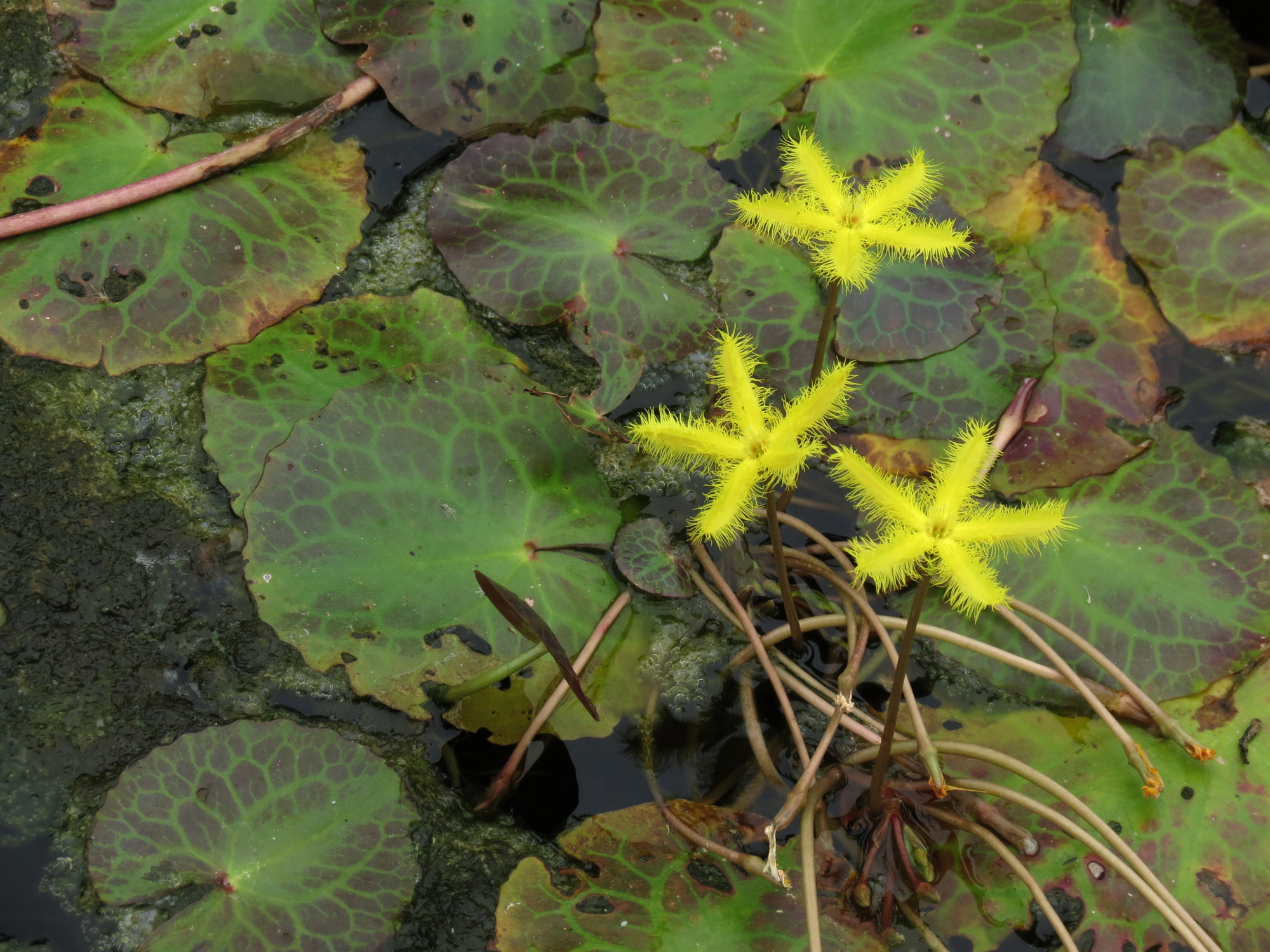

Scientific classification
- Kingdom: Plantae
- Clade: Tracheophytes
- Clade: Angiosperms
- Clade: Eudicots
- Clade: Asterids
- Order: Asterales
- Family: Menyanthaceae
- Genus: Nymphoides
- Species: N. crenata

Binomial name
- Nymphoides crenata (F.Muell.) Kuntze
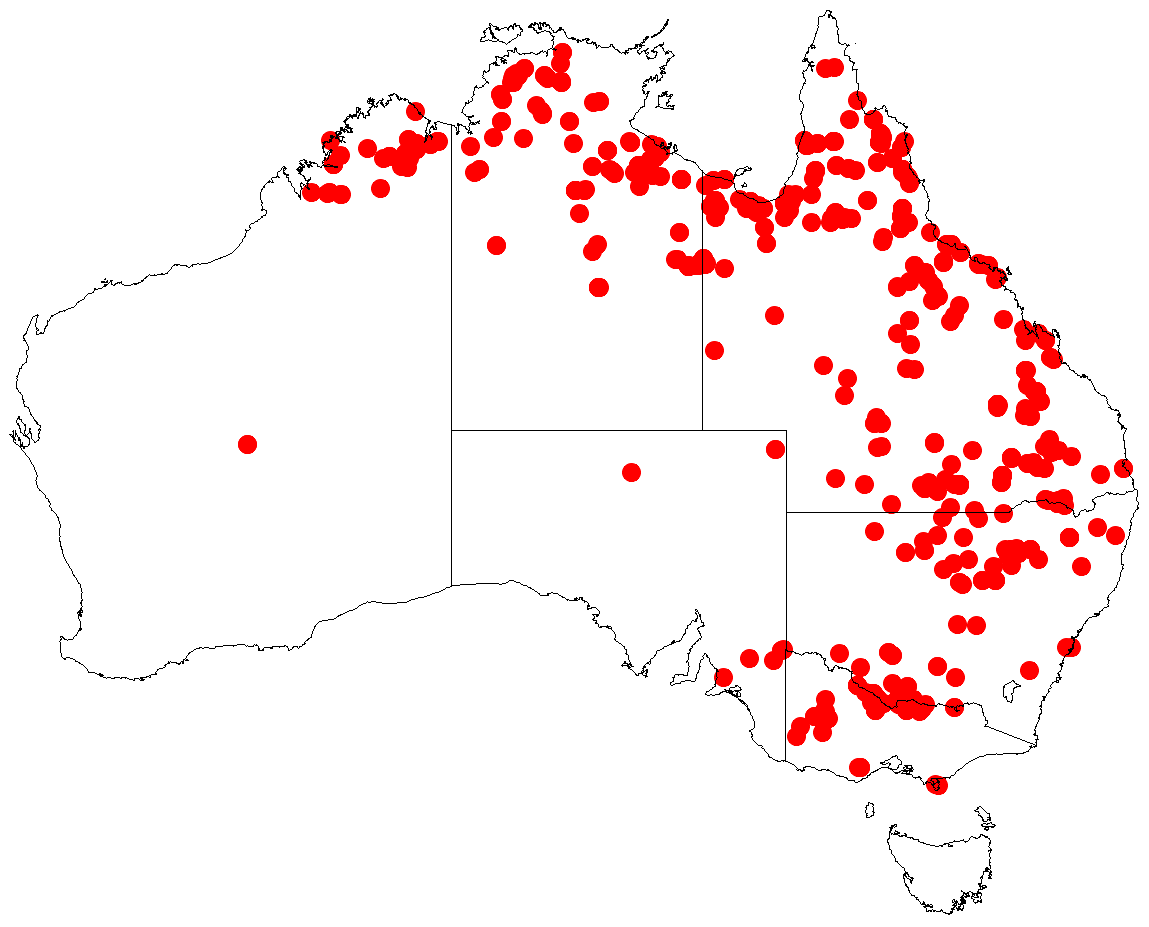
- Occurrence data from AVH

Synonyms
- Limnanthemum crenatum F.Muell. Villarsia crenata (F.Muell.) F.Muell.

= Nymphoides crenata =

Species of aquatic plant

Nymphoides crenata, commonly known as wavy marshwort, is an aquatic perennial herb of the family Menyanthaceae endemic to Australia, found in all mainland states and the Northern Territory

== Description ==
It is a stoloniferous, floating, perennial with stems up to 3 m long. The petioles of the basal leaves are from 8–42 cm long. The leaf lamina are ovate to circular, and deeply cordate and vary from 3 to 15 cm in length. The stem leaves are smaller, and sometimes kidney-shaped. The flowers heterostylous, (see the gallery) and there can be from 8 to14 in clusters subtended by 1–4 stem leaves, or sometimes in spaced pairs along a short inflorescence. The calyx is from 5.5 to 16 mm long and the corolla from 20 to 50 mm in diameter. There are usually 4 lobes (sometimes 4 or 6) and there are usually 5 stigmas (but from 2-5).

== Habitat ==
It grows on floodplains, in swamps, lagoons, irrigation channels, and also in temporarily inundated depressions, and in slow-flowing streams where the depth of the water is up to about 1.5 m deep, usually on mud, and it will persist on drying mud.

== Taxonomy ==
Nymphoides crenata was first described as Limnanthemum crenatum in 1854 by Ferdinand von Mueller. In 1891, Otto Kuntze transferred it to the genus, Nymphoides.

== Gallery ==
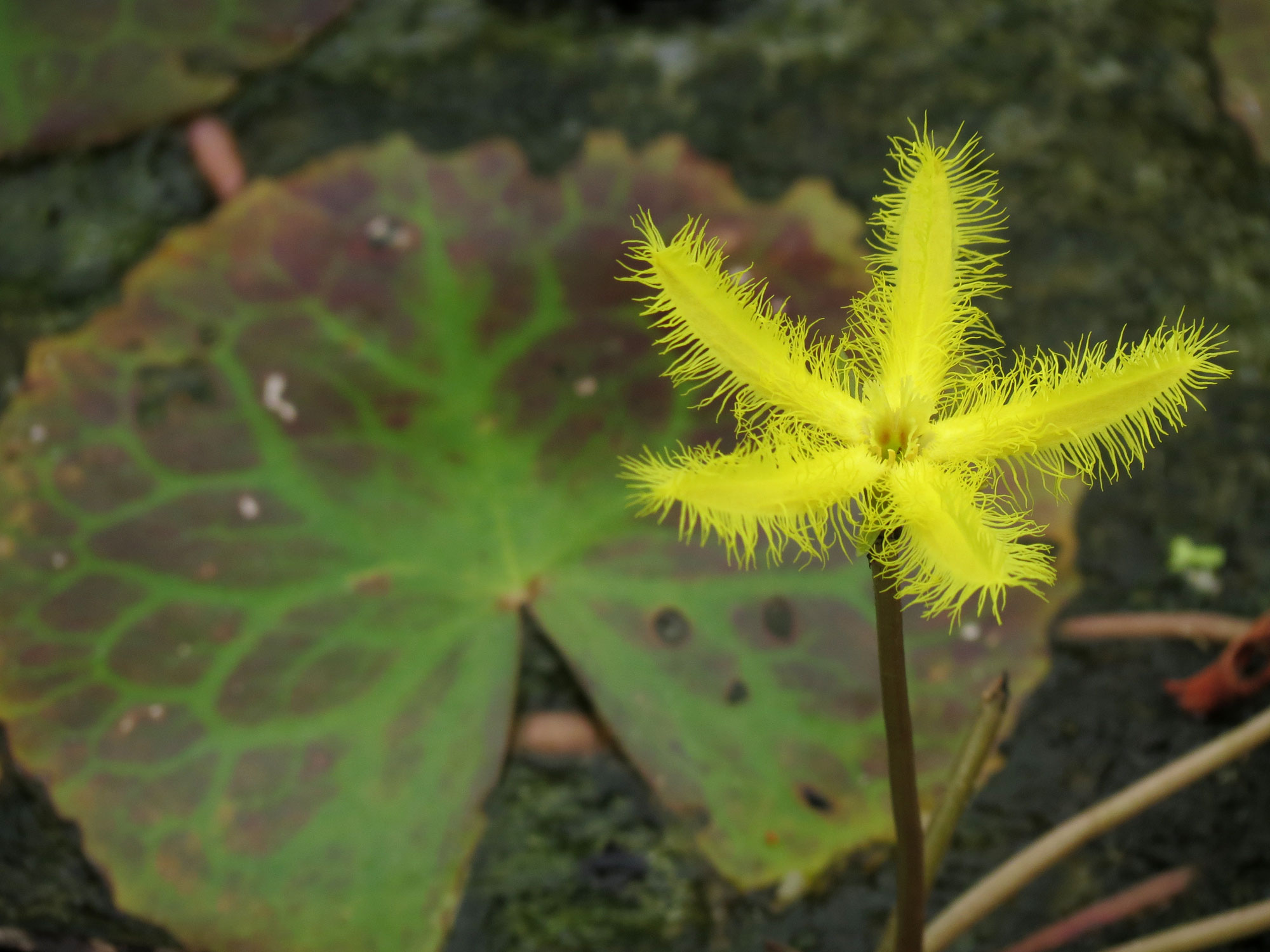

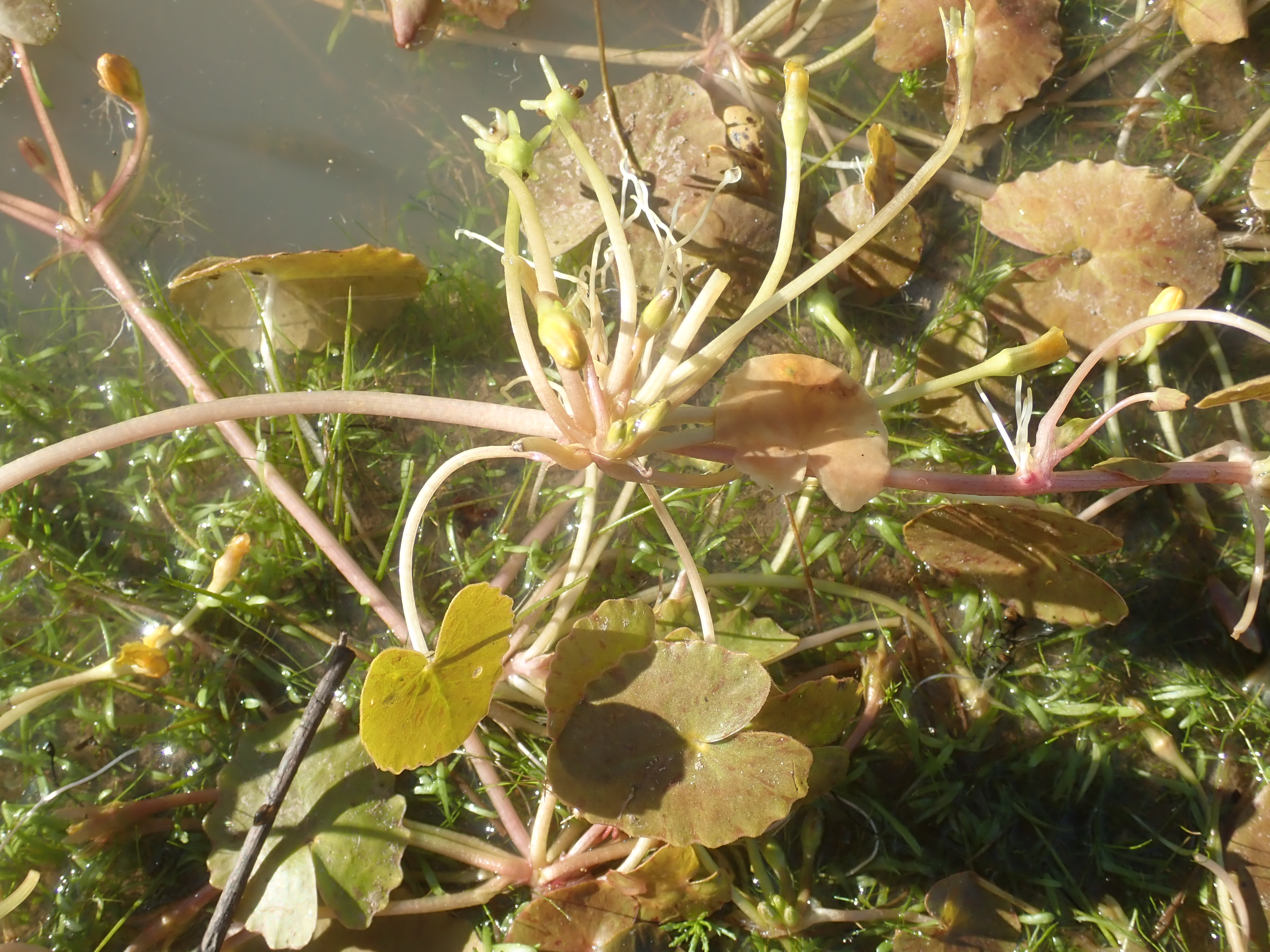
leaves & stem

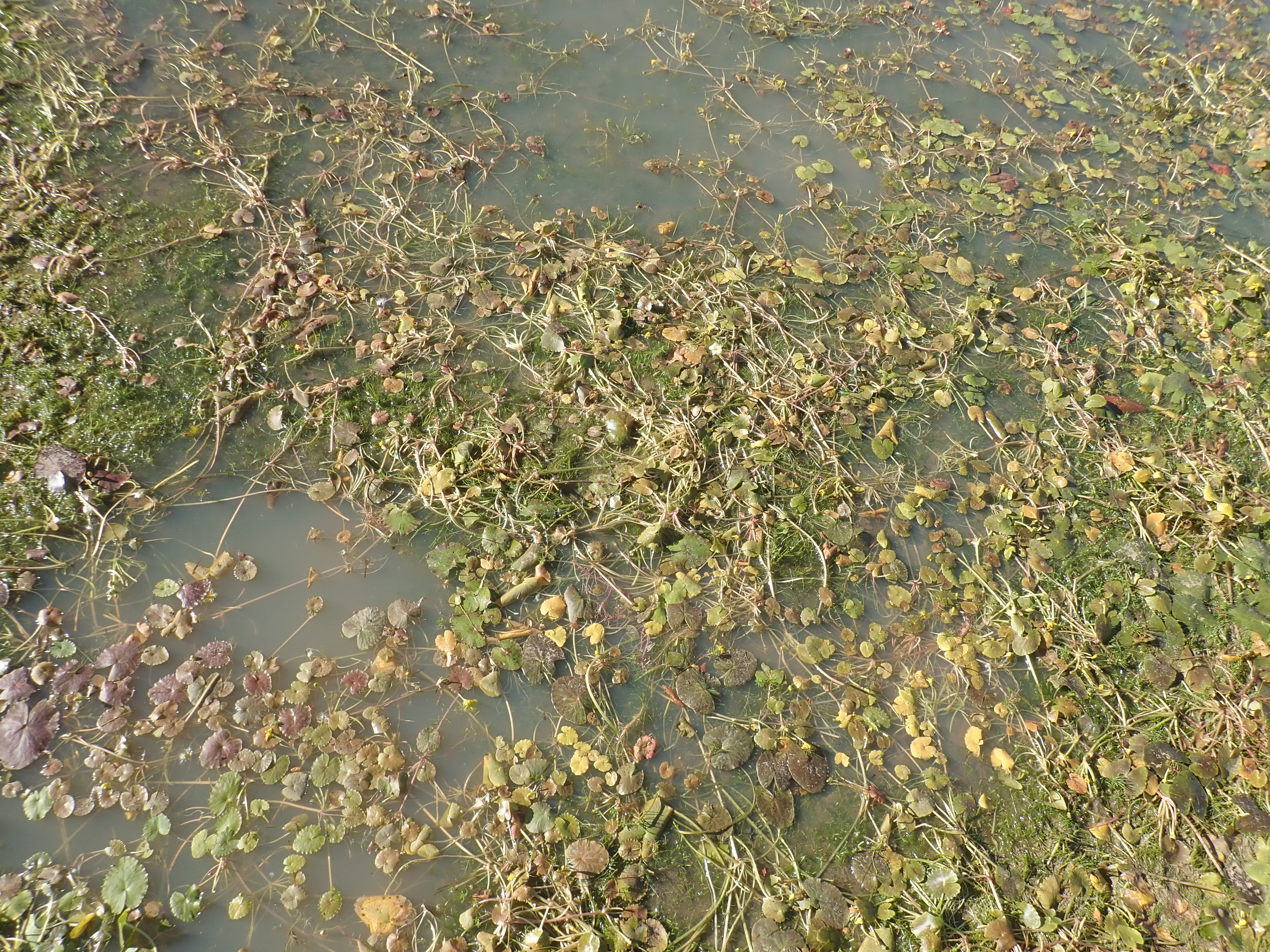
flooded plain

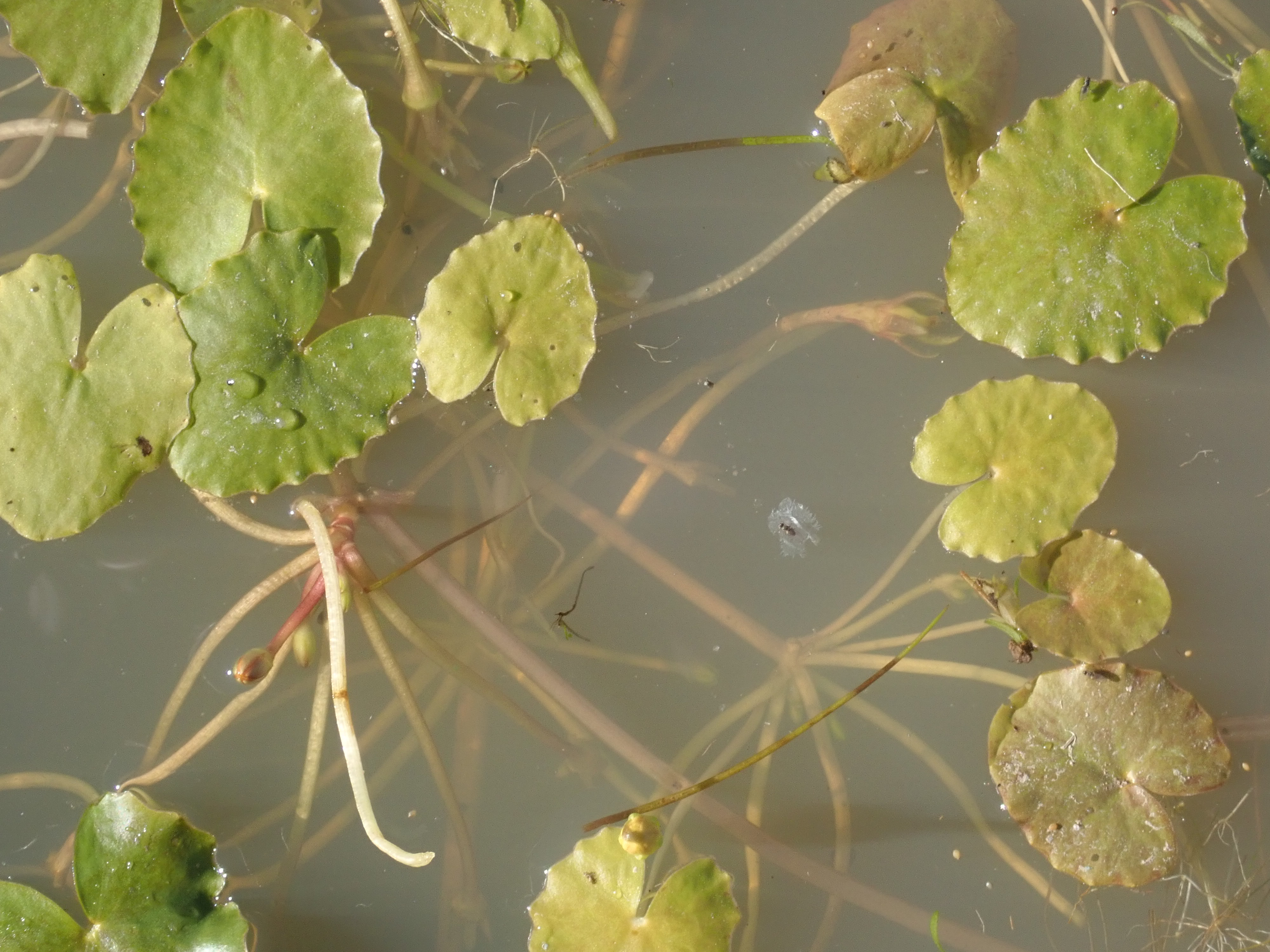
floating leaves & stems

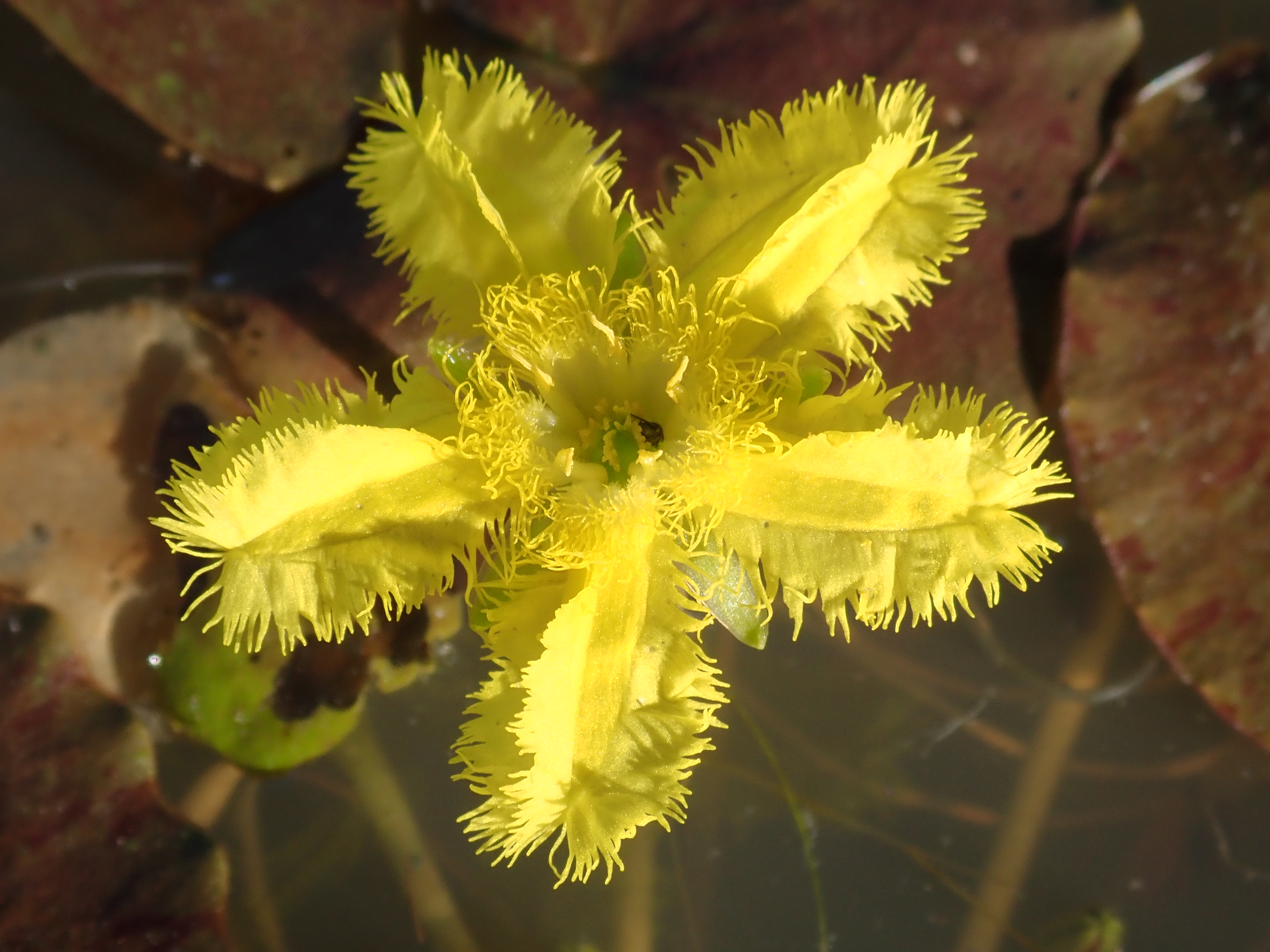
flower

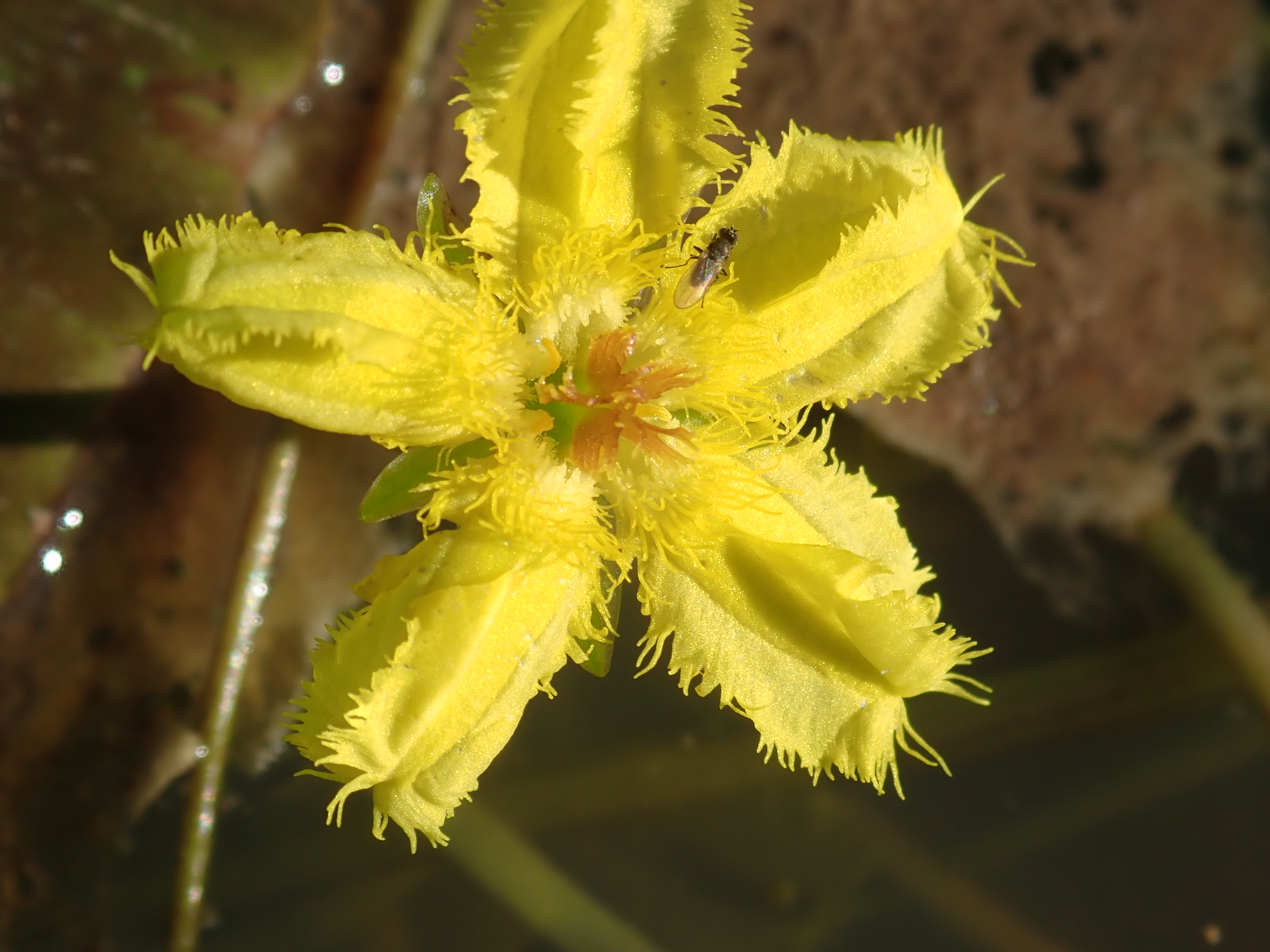
flower
