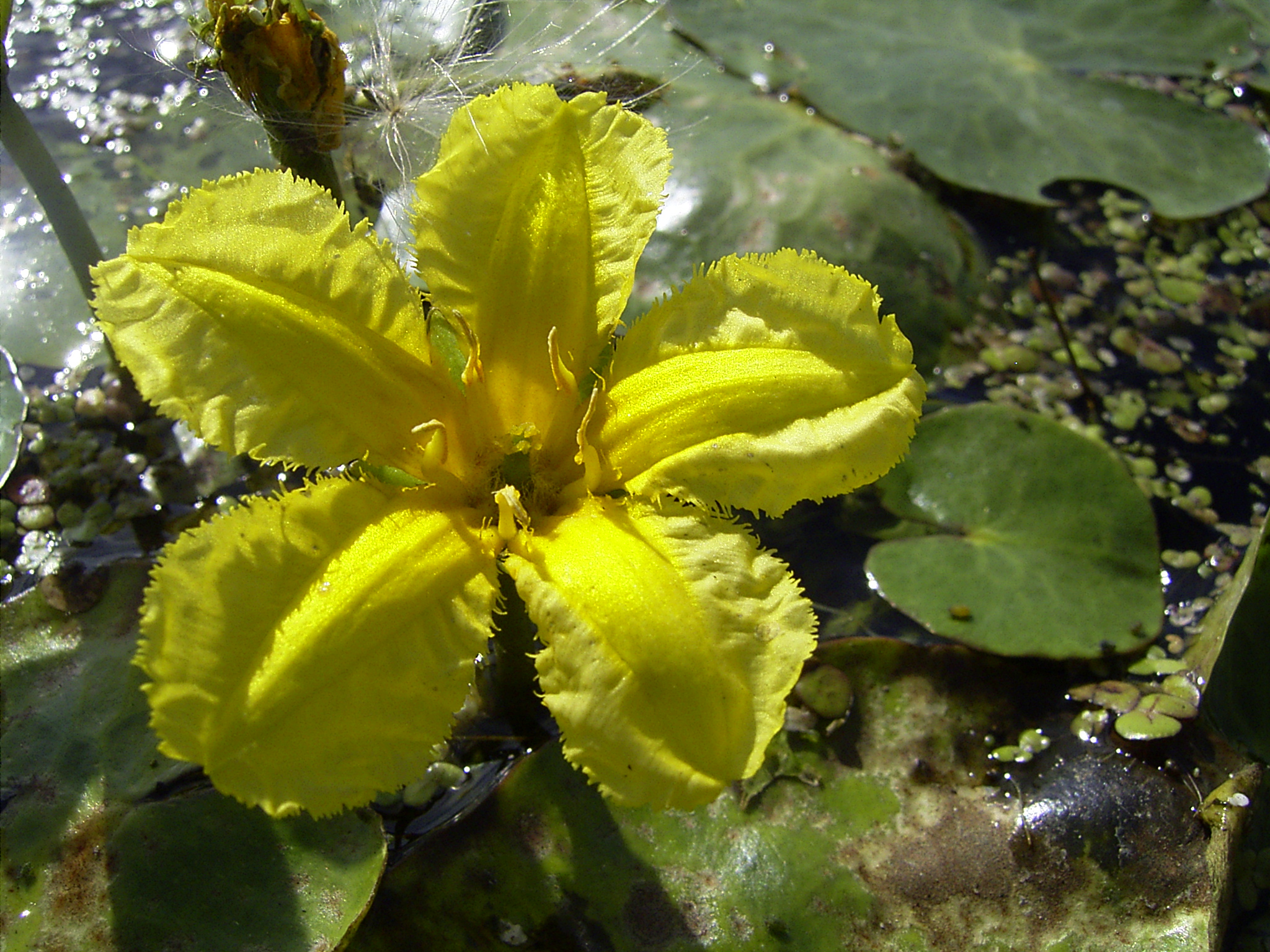
- Fringed water-lily in flower at Alkmaar, Netherlands

Conservation status
- Least Concern (IUCN 3.1)

Scientific classification
- Kingdom: Plantae
- Clade: Tracheophytes
- Clade: Angiosperms
- Clade: Eudicots
- Clade: Asterids
- Order: Asterales
- Family: Menyanthaceae
- Genus: Nymphoides
- Species: N. peltata

Binomial name
- Nymphoides peltata (S.G. Gmel.) Kuntze

= Nymphoides peltata =

Species of aquatic plant

Nymphoides peltata, the fringed water-lily is perennial, rooted aquatic plant with floating leaves of the family Menyanthaceae. Synonyms include Menyanthes nymphoides L., Villarsia nymphoides, Limnanthemum peltatum S.G.Gmel., Nymphoides nymphoides (L.) Britton, and other vernacular names include yellow floating heart, floating heart, water fringe, and entire marshwort.

It is native throughout most of Europe (excluding Ireland and Scandinavia) and temperate Asia, and locally in Algeria in northwest Africa.

It has been spread by human cultivation outside its native range and is now naturalised in Ireland, Denmark and Sweden, much of North America, and New Zealand. In many of its introduced regions, N. peltata is considered a noxious weed because it can form dense mats that shade out locally native aquatic plant species, thereby reducing biodiversity.

== Description ==
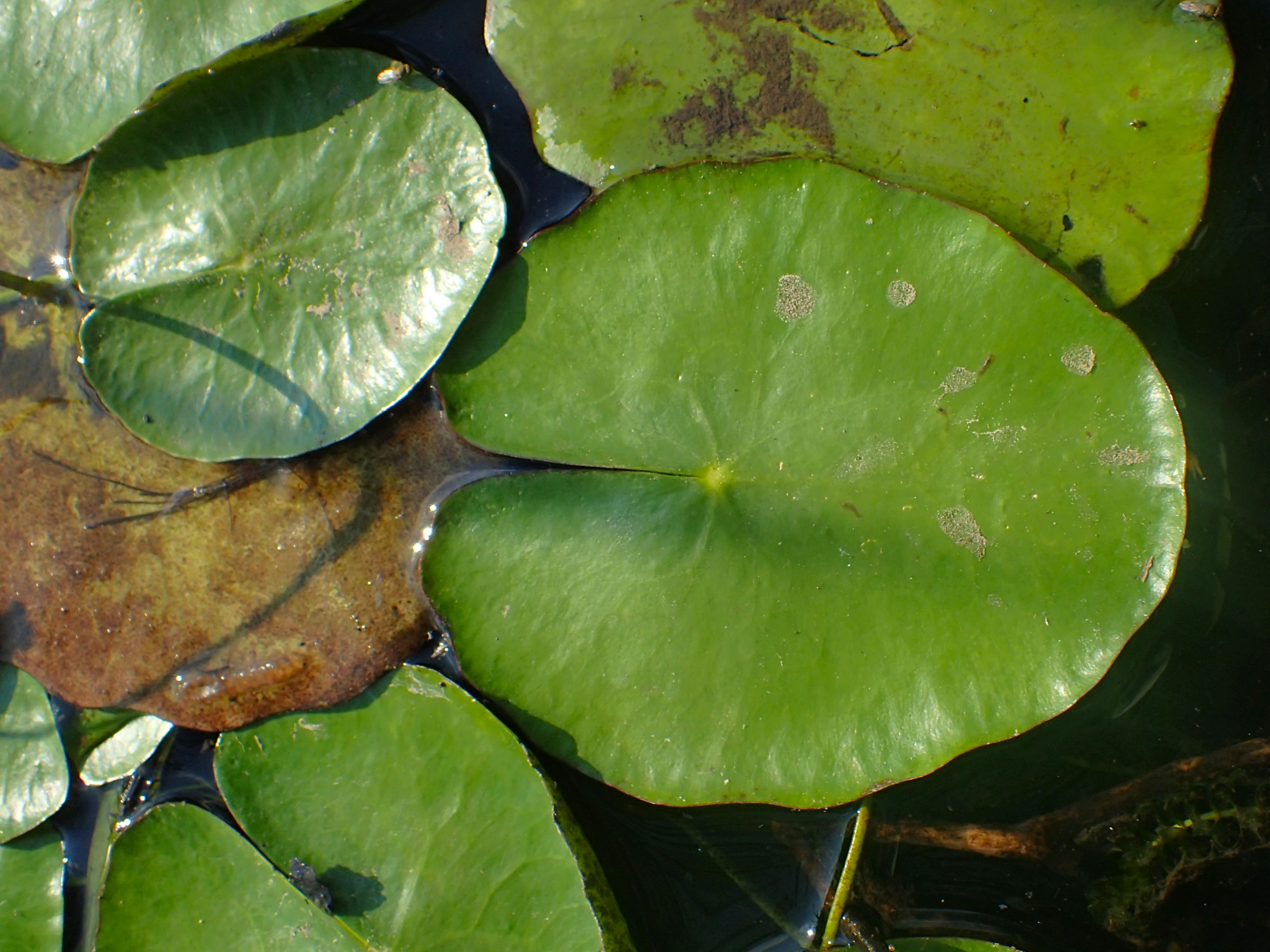
Leaves, Odra valley near Bielinek, Poland

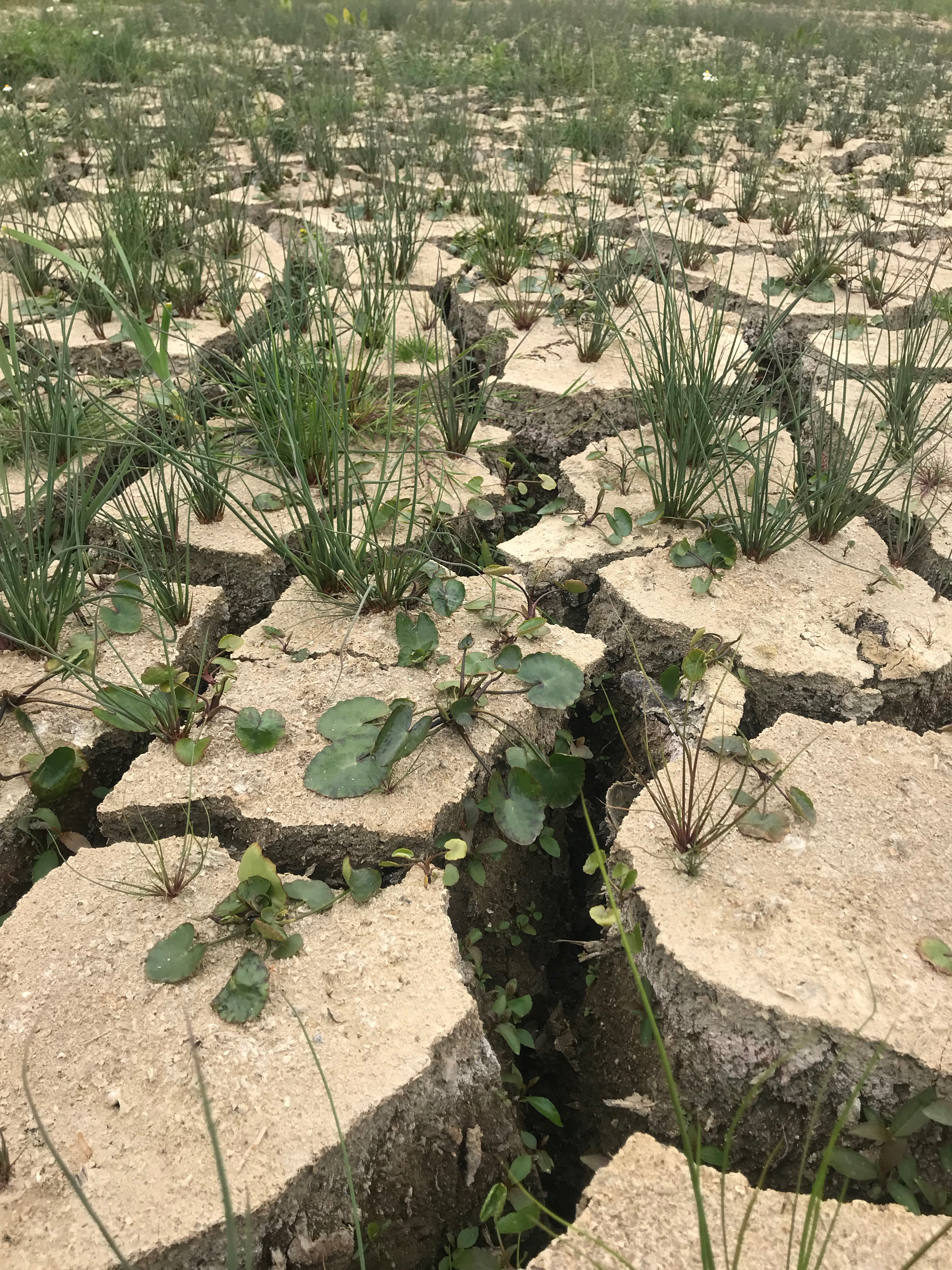
Nymphoides peltata during a drought, at Appledore, Devon, England

Fringed water-lily is an aquatic, bottom-rooted perennial species with underwater creeping stolons that extend in water up to 2 metres deep. Each node on a stolon can produce a new shoot and roots. N. peltata has cordate floating leaves that are 3–12 cm (rarely to 15 cm) diameter, nearly circular but with wavy margins and a narrow slit extending to the stem; they are green to yellow-green, often with purple blotches above and purple undersides, and are attach to submerged rhizomes. The leaves have slightly wavy margins and support a lax, or loose, inflorescence of two to five yellow flowers 3–4 cm diameter with a five-lobed corolla, and fringed petal margins. N. peltata flower peduncles rise a short distance out of the water. Each flower produces a 1.5–2.5 cm beaked capsule which hold many flattened seeds with stiff marginal hairs.

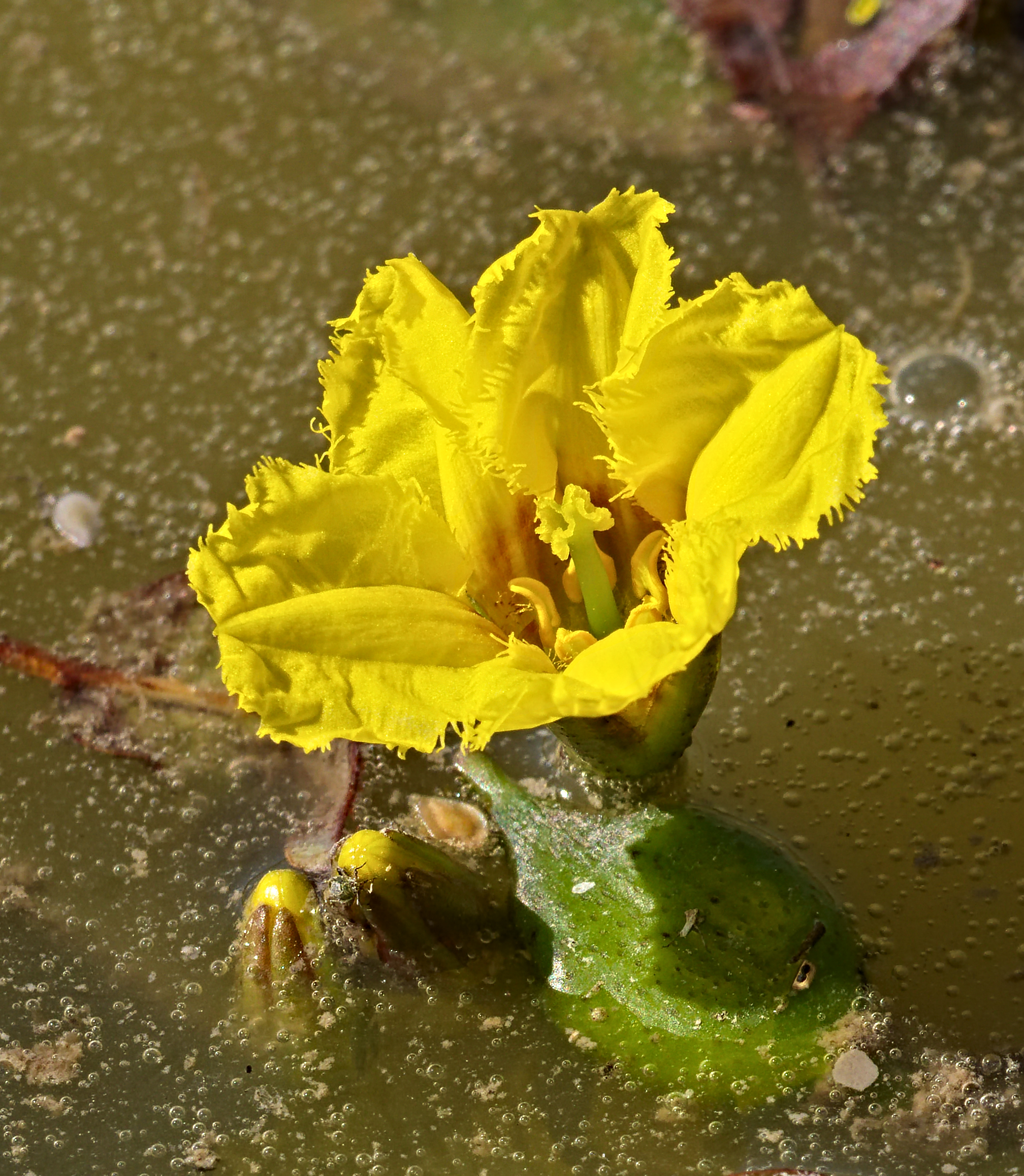
The frilled fringes on the flower margin which give the species its English name. Grand Étang de Birieux, near Lyon, France.

N. peltata is similar in appearance to species in the genera Nuphar and Nymphaea in the family Nymphaeaceae. It can be distinguished from both by its wavy-margined leaf, and by the flowers being in clusters of 2–5 together rather than singly. Nuphar can also be distinguished from N. peltata most easily by its larger leaves, which can measure up to 30 cm, and its cup-shaped flower. Nymphaea have angled leaf bases as opposed to the rounded leaf bases of Nymphoides, and Nymphoides have significantly longer peduncles that support smaller flowers. In order to identify different species within Nymphoides, flowers are usually required.

== Ecology ==
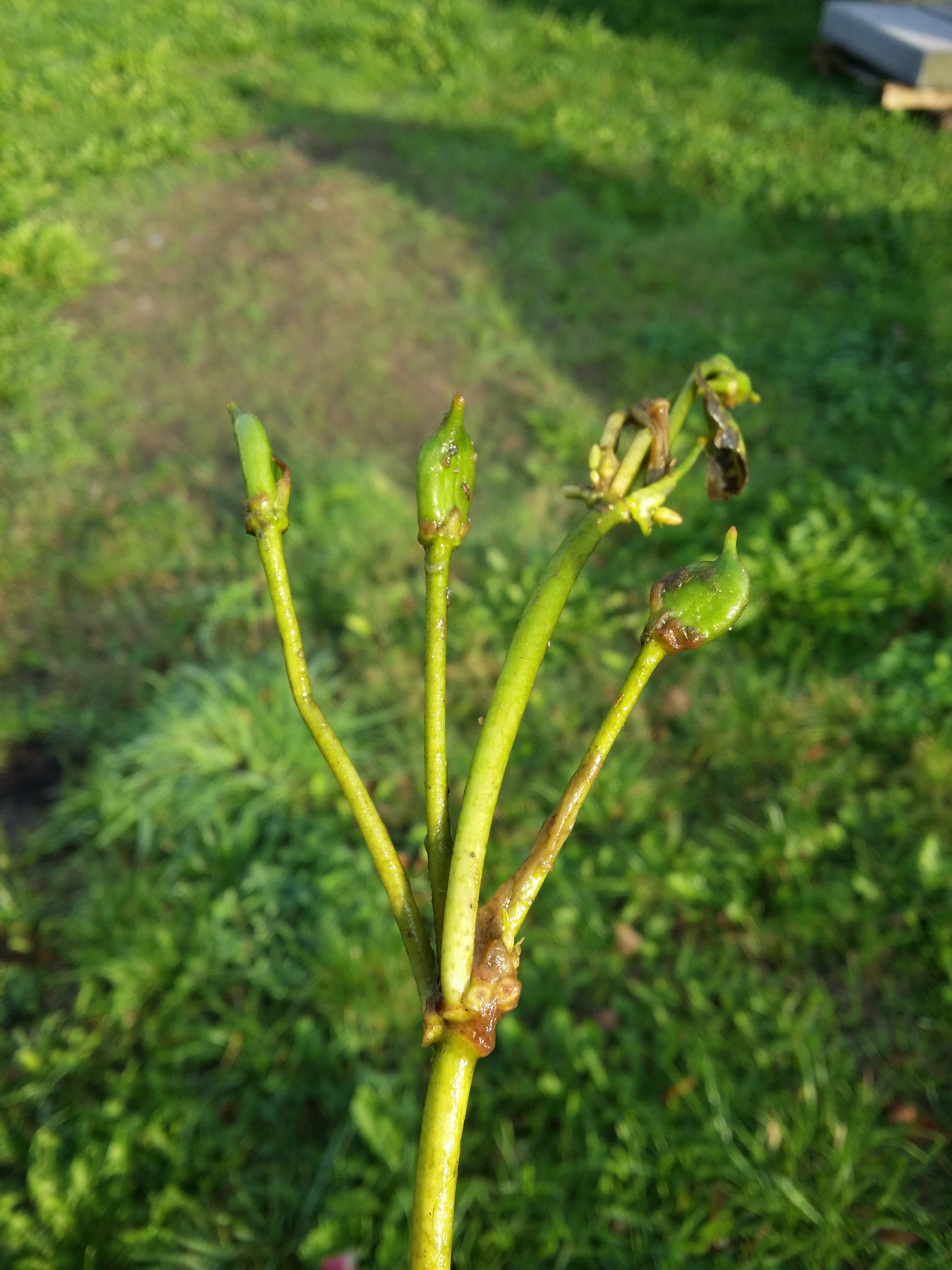
Immature fruit, at Gmünd, Austria

N. peltata is a freshwater species and does not occur in waters with an average salinity exceeding about 300 mg/L. N. peltata is most commonly found in slow-moving rivers, lakes, ponds, and reservoirs, but it can also establish in swamps and wetlands. It is also known to occur in ditches, canals, break-through pools of dikes, and backwaters, especially those subject to winter flooding. The presence of N. peltata can signal an environment with water movement.

Depending on water temperature, N. peltata flowers mainly between July and September, with outside dates from May to October. Each flower survives a single day, while leaves can persist from 23–43 days. Seeds are released 32–60 days following the end of the flowering period and can germinate under hypoxic conditions. In fall, the aboveground biomass of N. peltata dies, sinks to the substrate and decomposes, and the plant overwinters as dormant rhizomes. These rhizomes can survive freezing temperatures down to −30 °C. During the winter, stolons and stems either on or buried beneath the substrate can remain dormant until spring, and some small submerged leaves measuring 1–2 cm sometimes grow on these stems. After winter, the species requires light and oxygen to produce new growth and floating leaves begin to appear in spring.

N. peltata can reproduce vegetatively or sexually. Fragments of one plant, including stolons, rhizomes, and leaves attached to part of a stem, can also develop into a new plant. Seeds are produced either by cross or self-pollination, though self-pollination usually produces fewer and less viable seeds than cross-pollination. Seed dispersal is facilitated by the semi-hydrophobia of seeds, which causes them to float on the water's surface until disturbed. Seeds are suited to adhering to surfaces such as the flanks, folds of skin on digit webs, and the short feathers on the heads of waterfowl, which are hydrophobic. While in flight, the marginal trichomes surround the seeds keep the seeds attached to the bird, but once again in water, the seeds detach and sink to the substrate, where germination can commence. Adherence to amphibious animals and boats are two other possible dispersal mechanisms. Conversely, seeds that are eaten by waterfowl or fish are completely digested and no longer viable.

N. peltata is critically endangered in Spain, Belarus, and the Czech Republic, endangered in Lithuania, and vulnerable in Germany, Switzerland and Japan.

== As an invasive species ==
N. peltata are commonly sold for use in ornamental water gardens. The species is intentionally or accidentally transferred to lakes and rivers outside of its native range. In the United States, the first recorded occurrence of the plant was in 1882 in Massachusetts, and the plant has been sold domestically since the 1930s. N. peltata has been recorded in 29 U.S. states and Washington, D.C., and it has naturalised in slow-moving waters. In Canada, N. peltata has been found in Newfoundland, Nova Scotia, Quebec, Ontario, and British Columbia, but has not yet been naturalised. N. peltata was intentionally introduced to Sweden in the early 19th century and was first recorded as a non-indigenous species in 1870.[2] Native to central and eastern Britain, N. peltata was transported northern Britain and Ireland as an ornamental plant and first documented in Ireland in before 1866. In 1988, N. peltata was discovered in New Zealand, where it is considered a noxious weed. It is also designated an invasive species in Sweden, Ireland, and parts of North America.

N. peltata spreads the most aggressively in eutrophic lakes with neutral to alkaline water, but the species has also been found in oligotrophic lakes and acidic ponds. It most frequently occurs in water 1 to 1.5 m deep, but it can survive in water between 0.3 and 3.0 metres deep. The ideal substrate for N. peltata consists of clay or clay covered with a thin layer of sapropel. N. peltata occurs in temperate environments and has even been found eastern Ontario and western Russia. The northernmost limit of N. peltata is approximately the 16 °C July isotherm.

N. peltata can have many negative ecological and social impacts on its introduced regions. N. peltata can rapidly grow and spread to form dense patches of vegetation on the water's surface that restrict the amount of light penetrating the surface. As a result, native submerged macrophytes are excluded and biodiversity is reduced. Especially if algae are shaded out, entire food webs can be disrupted by dense populations of N. peltata. Dense N. peltata mats can also reduce the amount of oxygen in water and create stagnant water areas. Fish and other aquatic wildlife can also be forced to relocate once N. peltata mats form. N. peltata also affects internal fertilisation patterns as it moves nitrogen and phosphorus up from the sediment to its floating biomass as it grows and releases these nutrients back into the ecosystem during its winter decomposition.

=== Control strategies ===
As N. peltata can propagate through fragmentation, mechanical control is a challenging strategy because it can often aid in dispersal. One approach is to cut leaf petioles one to two times each spring and summer. Cutting, harvesting, and covering plants with barrier materials can sometimes result in a successful control effort. Hand raking can be a viable strategy in very localised areas. However, dredging is not an effective method as roots and rhizomes can survive mechanical dredging.

There are no known effective biological control agents for N. peltata. While grass carp may feed on parts of N. peltata, the fish usually first consumes submerged macrophytes and has not been shown to feed on N. peltata.

Glyphosate applied to floating leaves after emergence during late spring or summer has been used as a chemical control for N. peltata. Nonetheless, repeated applications are necessary, and spraying floating leaves shows 40-50% control for a single season. Dichlobenil is more effective than glyphosate in controlling N. peltata. The application of the chemical in the spring during emergence coupled with mechanical removal of floating leaves and repeated dichlobenil applications has been successful. However, the producers of dichlobenil advise not to treat more than 20% of a waterbody and to not treat areas where flow exceeds 90m/hour. In Ireland, dichlobenil is no longer legally allowed to be used near or in waterbodies as it can potentially harm other aquatic organisms such as fish.

== Uses ==
N. peltata is an edible plant. Leaves and flowers are cooked as a potherb, and so are the stems, but only the interior of the stem is eaten. Seeds are ground and used for other culinary purposes. The fresh leaves are commonly used to treat headaches.
