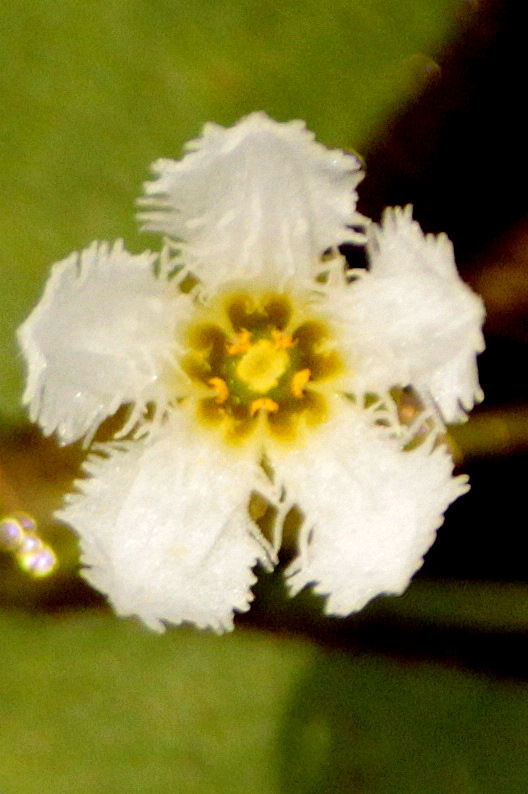

Scientific classification
- Kingdom: Plantae
- Clade: Tracheophytes
- Clade: Angiosperms
- Clade: Eudicots
- Clade: Asterids
- Order: Asterales
- Family: Menyanthaceae
- Genus: Nymphoides
- Species: N. balakrishnanii

Binomial name
- Nymphoides balakrishnanii P.Biju, Josekutty, Haneef & Augustine

= Nymphoides balakrishnanii =

Species of aquatic plant

Nymphoides balakrishnanii is an aquatic plant in the Menyanthaceae, endemic to lateritic plateaus of the southern Western Ghats of India.

== Distribution ==
This species is restricted to a seasonal pond in the lateritic hillocks of Koovapara, Kasaragod, Kerala, India.

== Etymology ==
The species is named to honor Mr. V. C. Balakrishnan, a dedicated conservation biologist in Northern Kerala.
