= Nymphoides montana =

Scientific classification
- Kingdom: Plantae
- Clade: Tracheophytes
- Clade: Angiosperms
- Clade: Eudicots
- Clade: Asterids
- Order: Asterales
- Family: Menyanthaceae
- Genus: Nymphoides
- Species: N. montana

Binomial name
- Nymphoides montana Aston

Species of aquatic plant

Nymphoides montana, commonly known as marshwort, is an aquatic plant of the family Menyanthaceae native to southeastern Australia.
