= Nymphoides sivarajanii =

Conservation status
- Critically Endangered (IUCN 3.1)

Scientific classification
- Kingdom: Plantae
- Clade: Tracheophytes
- Clade: Angiosperms
- Clade: Eudicots
- Clade: Asterids
- Order: Asterales
- Family: Menyanthaceae
- Genus: Nymphoides
- Species: N. sivarajanii

Binomial name
- Nymphoides sivarajanii K.T.Joseph

Species of flowering plant

Nymphoides sivarajanii is a critically endangered aquatic plant of the family Menyanthaceae endemic to Chettipadi in Malappuram district in Kerala, India.
