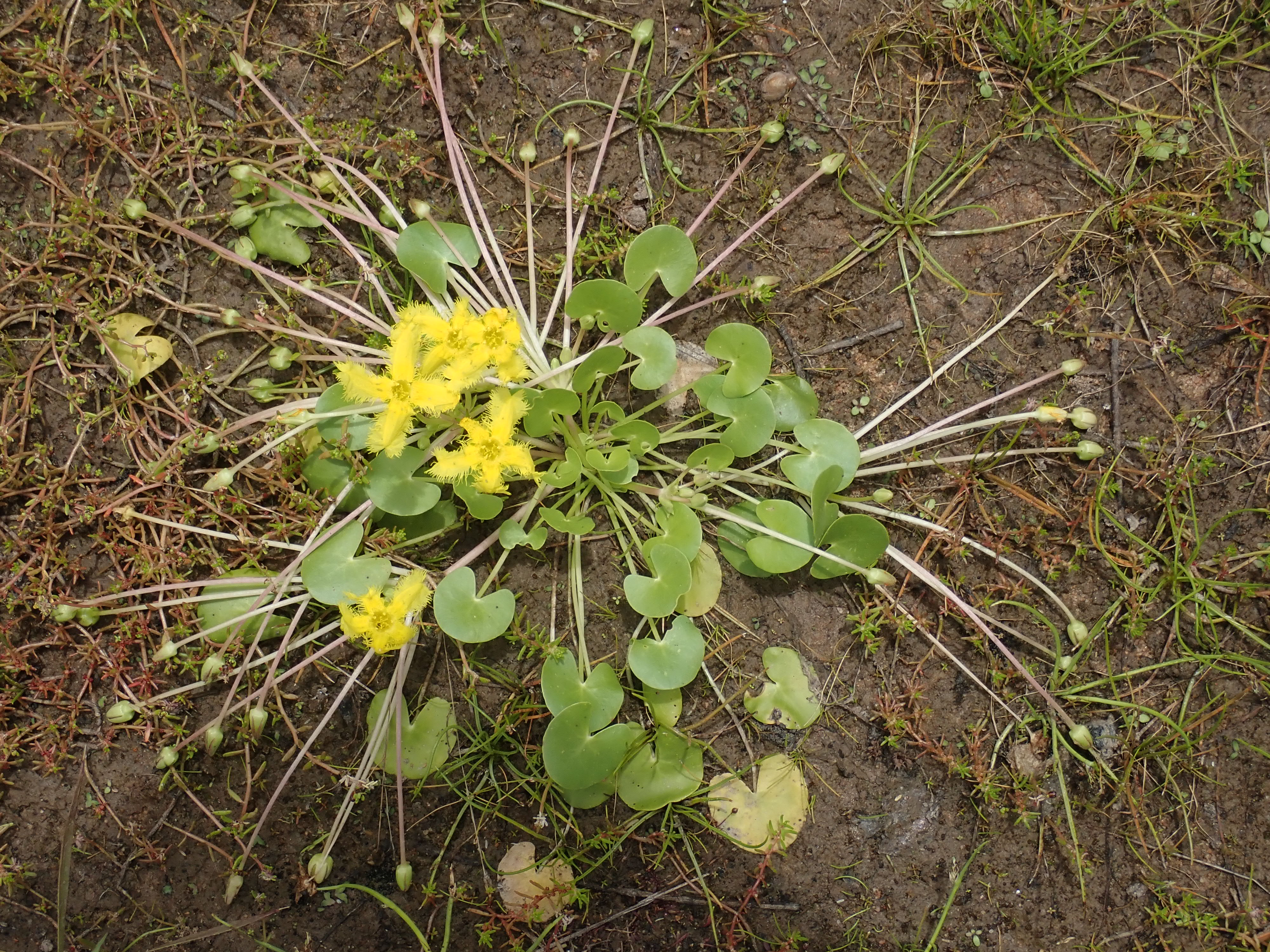
- Nymphoides geninata: plant: flowers, fruits and leaves

Scientific classification
- Kingdom: Plantae
- Clade: Tracheophytes
- Clade: Angiosperms
- Clade: Eudicots
- Clade: Asterids
- Order: Asterales
- Family: Menyanthaceae
- Genus: Nymphoides
- Species: N. geminata

Binomial name
- Nymphoides geminata (R.Br.) Kuntze

= Nymphoides geminata =

Species of aquatic plant

Nymphoides geminata, commonly known as entire marshwort, is an aquatic plant of the family Menyanthaceae native to eastern Australia.

It was first described by Robert Brown in 1810 as Villarsia geminata, but was transferred to the genus Nymphoides by Otto Kuntze in 1891.
