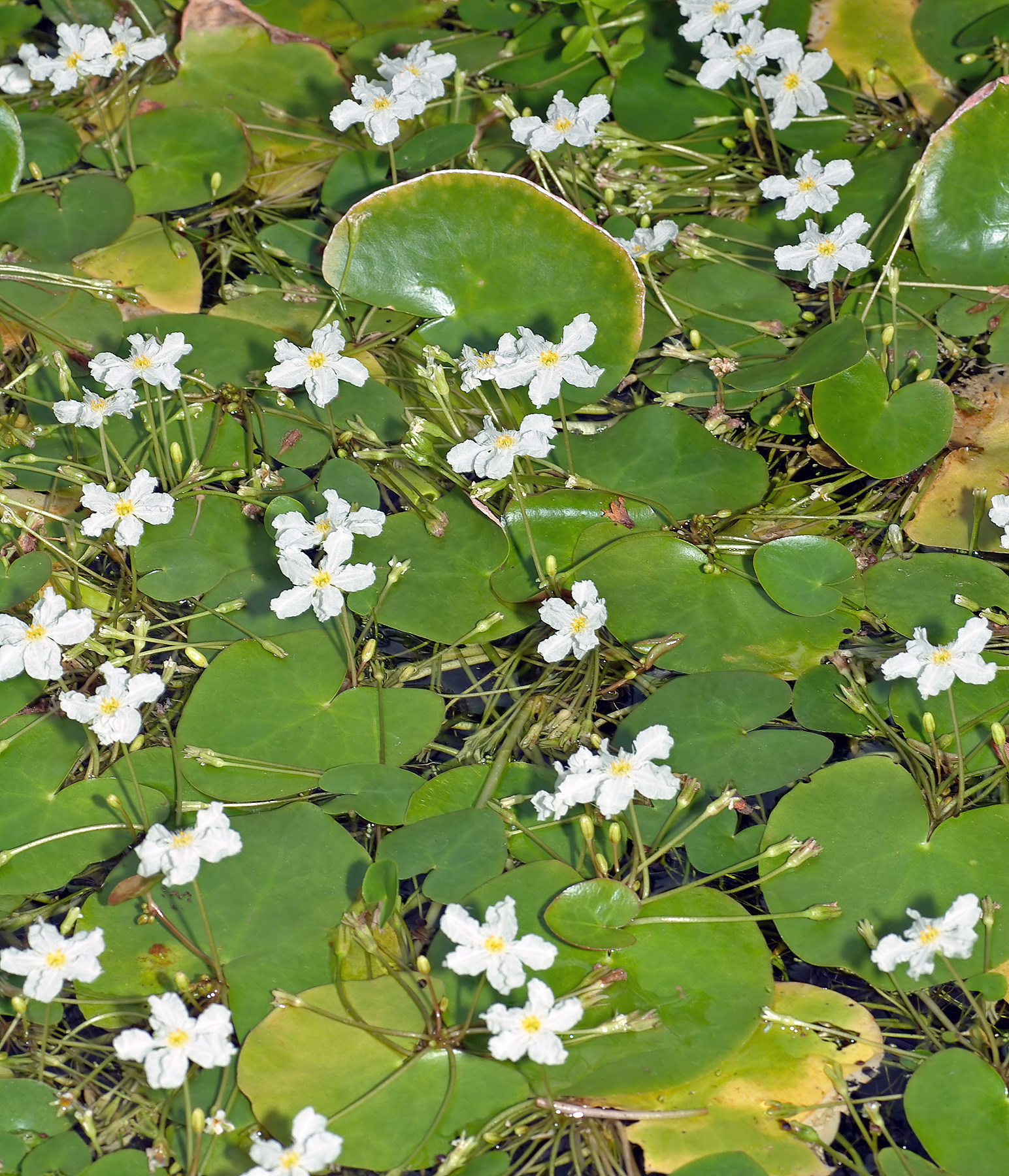
- Nymphoides ezannoi

Scientific classification
- Kingdom: Plantae
- Clade: Tracheophytes
- Clade: Angiosperms
- Clade: Eudicots
- Clade: Asterids
- Order: Asterales
- Family: Menyanthaceae
- Genus: Nymphoides; Ség. 1754

Species
- See text

= Nymphoides =

Genus of flowering plants

Nymphoides, or floatingheart, is a genus of aquatic flowering plants in the family Menyanthaceae. The genus name refers to their resemblance to the water lily Nymphaea. Nymphoides are aquatic plants with submerged roots and floating leaves that hold the small flowers above the water surface. Flowers are sympetalous, most often divided into five lobes (petals). The petals are either yellow or white and may be adorned with lateral wings or covered in small hairs. The inflorescence consists of either an umbellate cluster of flowers or a lax raceme, with internodes occurring between generally paired flowers.

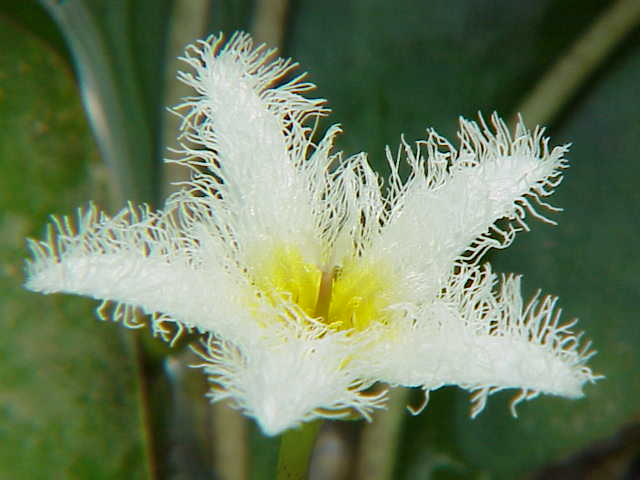
flower of Nymphoides indica

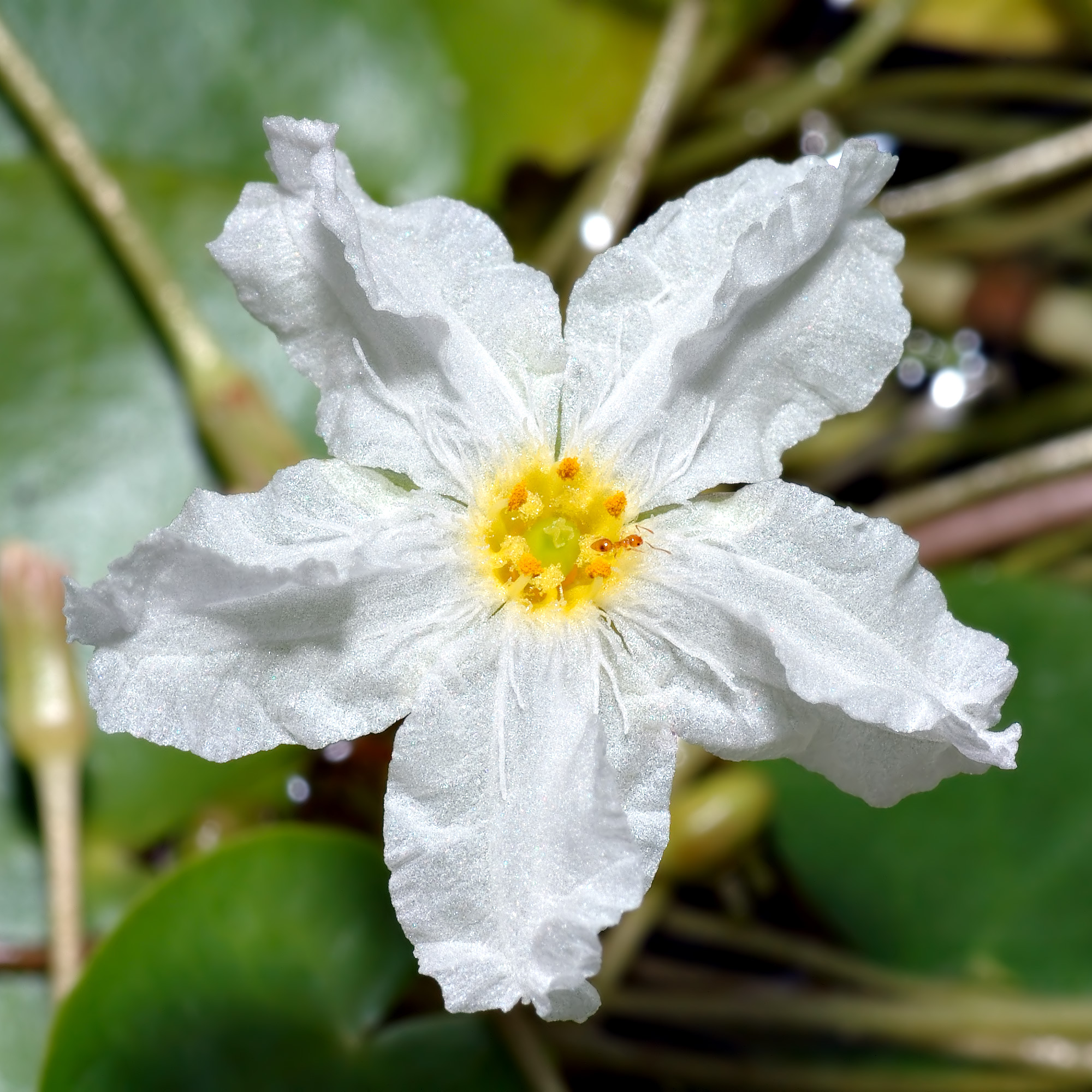
flower of Nymphoides ezannoi

Species of Nymphoides are sold as aquarium plants, including the "banana plant", N. aquatica and the "water snowflake", N. indica. Species native to the United States are N. cordata in the northeast and N. aquatica in the southeast. Nymphoides peltata is native to Europe and Asia but can be found in the United States as an invasive aquatic weed. The non-native species N. cristata and N. indica also reportedly occur in Florida (Jacono 2000).

Nymphoides hydrophylla's slim stems (spears) are eaten as a vegetable in Taiwan.

Numerous species of Nymphoides grow in Australia, and others exist in Africa, America, and Asia.

Species

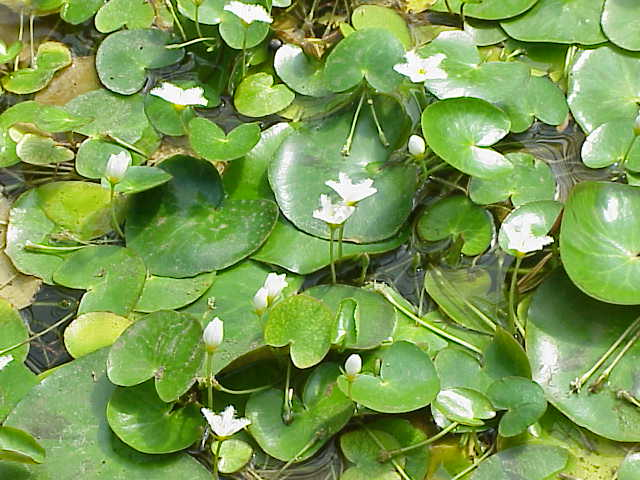
Nymphoides indica

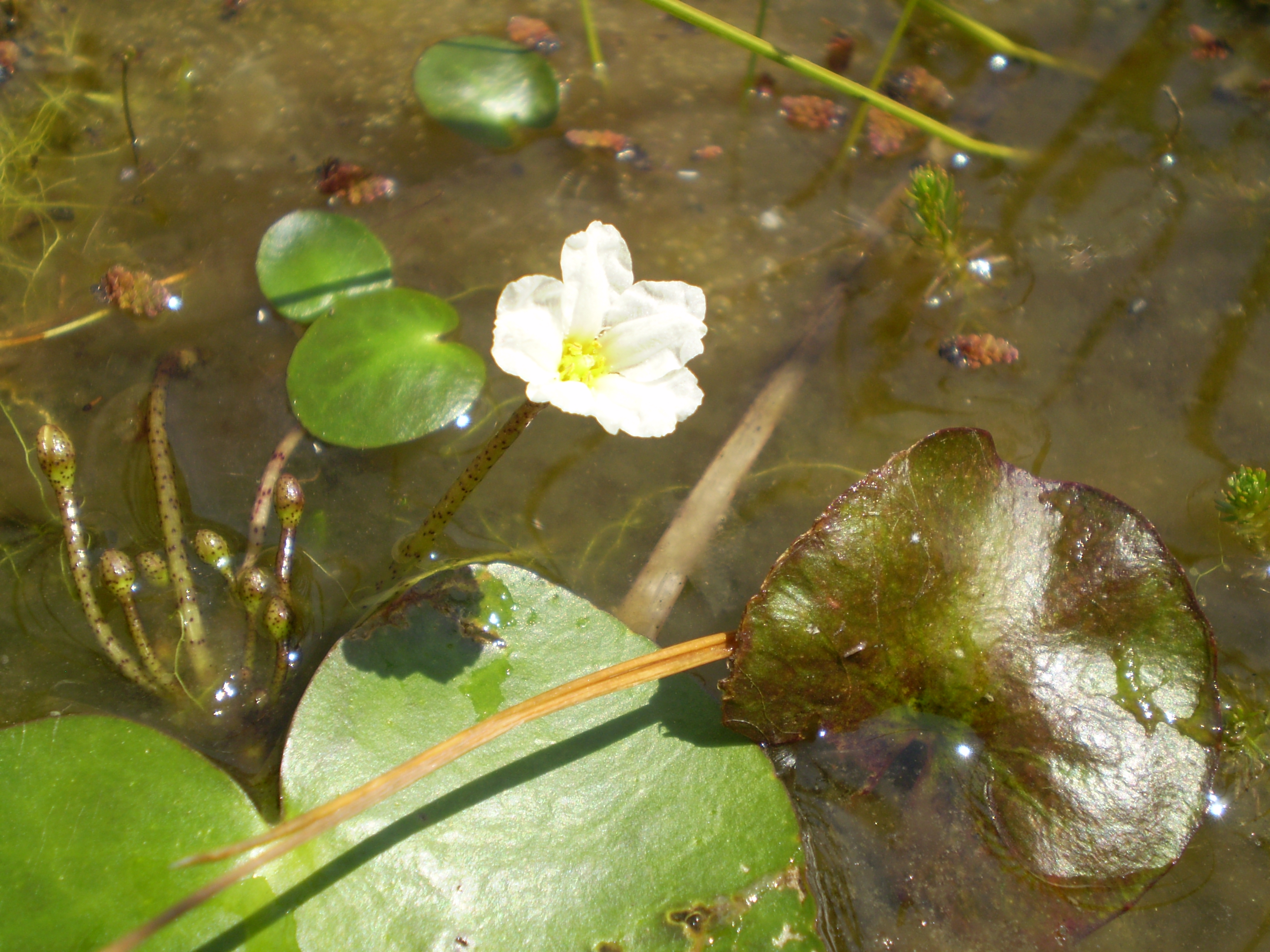
Nymphoides aquatica

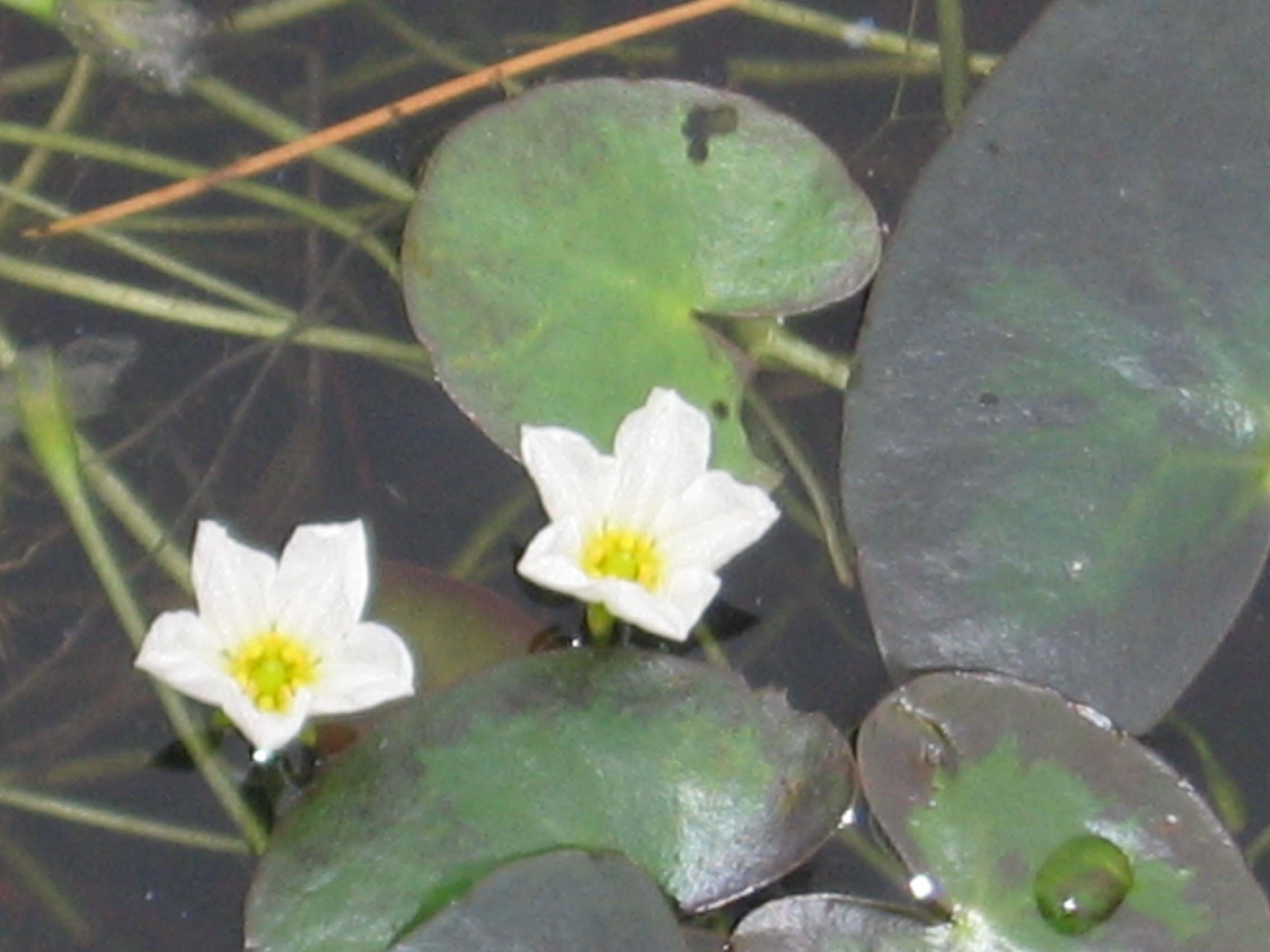
Nymphoides cordata

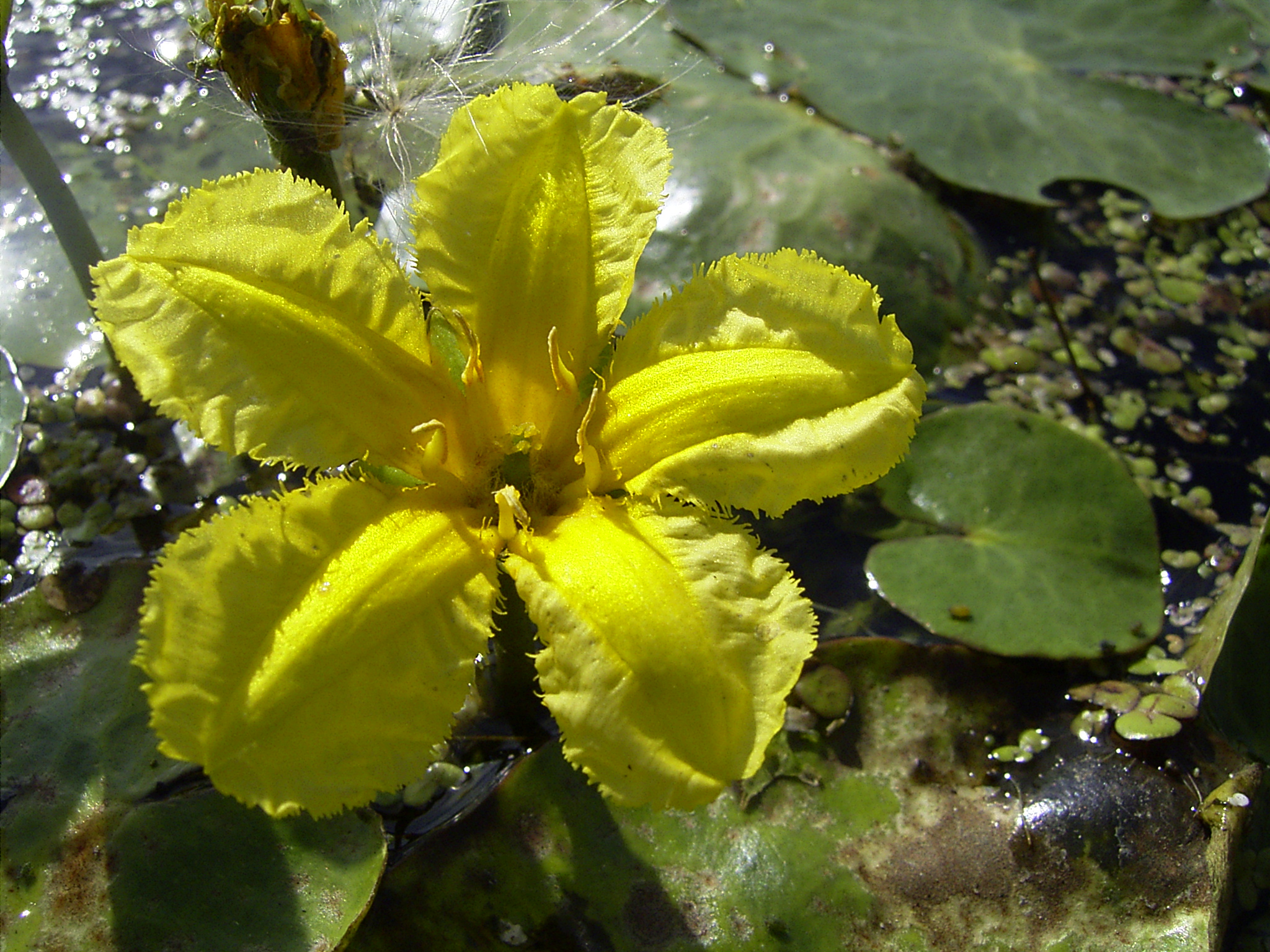
Nymphoides peltata

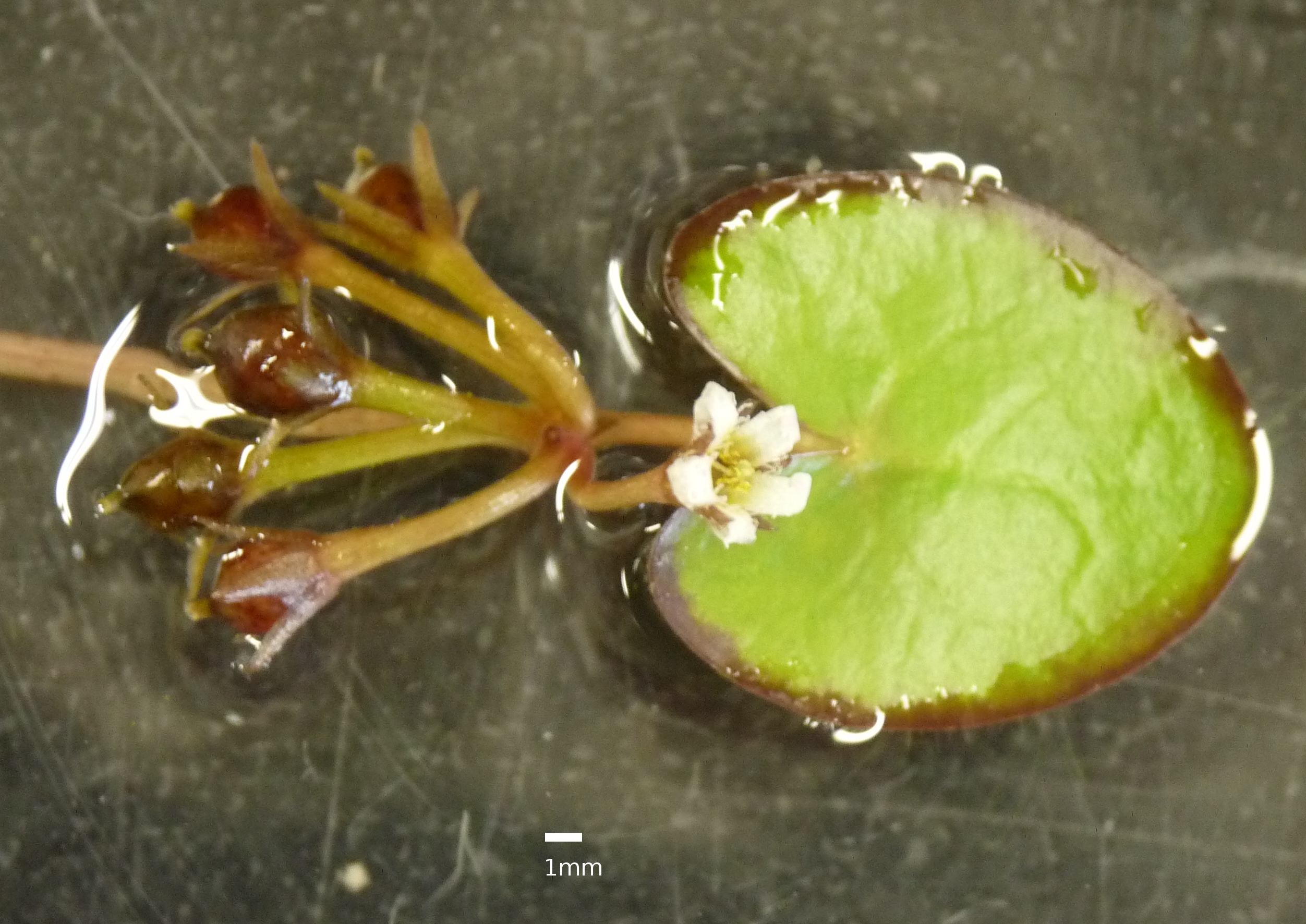
Nymphoides coreana

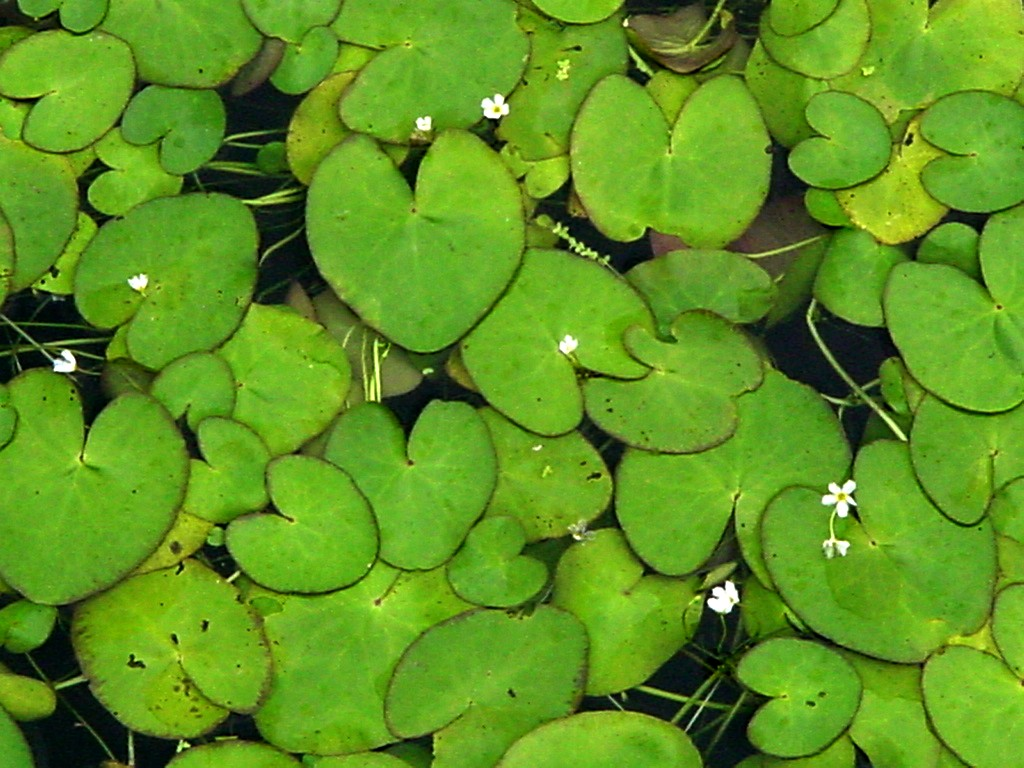
Nymphoides hydrophylla

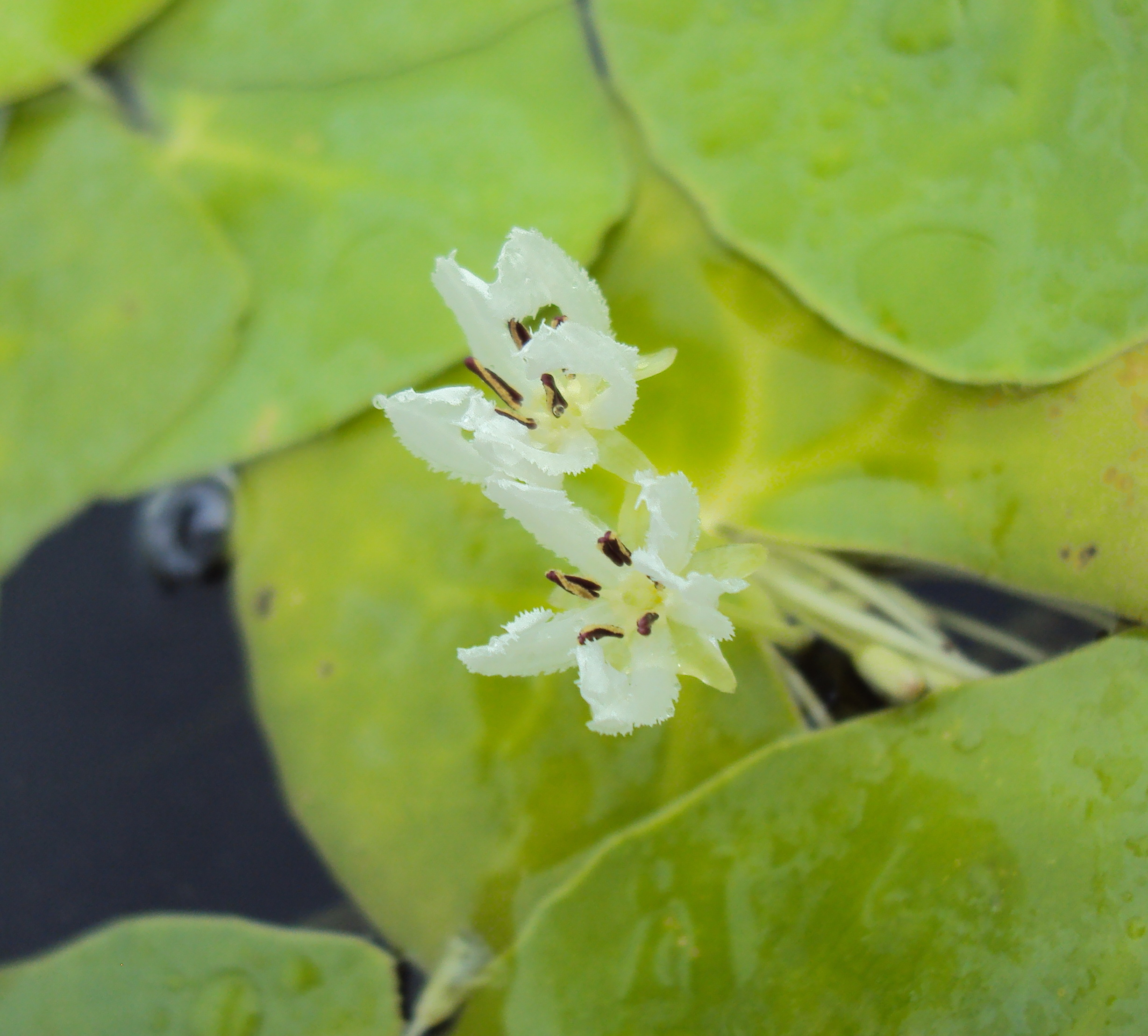
Nymphoides krishnakesara

There are approximately 50 species of Nymphoides, including:

Pantropical:

- Nymphoides indica (L.) Kuntze

Africa:

- Nymphoides bosseri A.Raynal
- Nymphoides brevipedicellata (Vatke) A.Raynal
- Nymphoides elegans A.Raynal
- Nymphoides ezannoi Berhaut
- Nymphoides forbesiana (Griseb.) Kuntze
- Nymphoides guineensis A.Raynal
- Nymphoides humilis A.Raynal
- Nymphoides milnei A.Raynal
- Nymphoides moratiana A.Raynal
- Nymphoides rautaneni (N.E.Br.) A.Raynal
- Nymphoides tenuissima A.Raynal
- Nymphoides thunbergiana (Griseb.) Kuntze

North America:

- Nymphoides aquatica (J.F.Gmel.) Kuntze
- Nymphoides cordata (Elliott) Fernald

Central and South America:

- Nymphoides fallax Ornduff
- Nymphoides flaccida L.Sm.
- Nymphoides grayana (Griseb.) Kuntze
- Nymphoides herzogii A.Galàn-Mera & G.Navarro
- Nymphoides humboldtiana (Kunth) Kuntze
- Nymphoides microphylla (A.St.-Hil.) Kuntze
- Nymphoides verrucosa (R.E.Fries)A.Galàn-Mera & G.Navarro

Eurasia:

- Nymphoides peltata (S.G.Gmel.) Kuntze

Asia:

- Nymphoides balakrishnanii P.Biju, Josekutty, Haneef & Augustine
- Nymphoides coreana (Léveille) Hara
- Nymphoides hastata (Dop) Kerr
- Nymphoides hydrophylla (Lour.) Kuntze
- Nymphoides krishnakesara K.T.Joseph & Sivar.
- Nymphoides lungtanensis S.P.Li, T.H.Hsieh & C.C.Lin
- Nymphoides macrospermum Vasudevan
- Nymphoides siamensis (Ostenf.) Kerr
- Nymphoides sivarajanii K.T.Joseph
- Nymphoides tonkinensis (Dop) P.H.Ho

Asia and Australia:

- Nymphoides aurantiaca (Dalzell) Kuntze
- Nymphoides parvifolia (Wall.) Kuntze

Australia:

- Nymphoides beaglensis Aston
- Nymphoides crenata (F.Muell.) Kuntze
- Nymphoides disperma Aston
- Nymphoides elliptica Aston
- Nymphoides exigua (F.Muell.) Kuntze
- Nymphoides exiliflora (F.Muell.) Kuntze
- Nymphoides furculifolia Specht
- Nymphoides geminata (R.Br.) Kuntze
- Nymphoides hydrocharioides (F.Muell.) Kuntze
- Nymphoides montana Aston
- Nymphoides planosperma Aston
- Nymphoides quadriloba Aston
- Nymphoides simulans Aston
- Nymphoides spinulosperma Aston
- Nymphoides spongiosa Aston
- Nymphoides stygia (J.M.Black) H.Eichler
- Nymphoides subacuta Aston
- Nymphoides triangularis Aston
