= Ornduffia calthifolia =

Conservation status
- Endangered (EPBC Act)

Scientific classification
- Kingdom: Plantae
- Clade: Embryophytes
- Clade: Tracheophytes
- Clade: Angiosperms
- Clade: Eudicots
- Clade: Asterids
- Order: Asterales
- Family: Menyanthaceae
- Genus: Ornduffia
- Species: O. calthifolia

Binomial name
- Ornduffia calthifolia (F.Muell.) Tippery & Les

Synonyms
- Villarsia calthifolia F. Muell.

Species of flowering plant

Ornduffia calthifolia, also known as mountain villarsia, is a species of plant in the Menyanthaceae family of wetland plants that is endemic to Western Australia.

== Description ==
The species grows as an erect, many-branched, semi-succulent, perennial herb to a height of about 40& cm when not in flower and to 75 cm when flowering. The fleshy leaves are round with toothed edges and shaped as shallow cups. The yellow flowers are 1 cm long, with 5 petals and 5 broad sepals. The seed capsules s are 1 cm long and open into 4 valves to release the seeds.

== Distribution and habitat ==
The species only occurs in the granite peaks, outcrops and drainage lines of the Porongurup Range, in the Jarrah Forest IBRA bioregion of Southwest Australia, mainly above an altitude of 400 m. There the plants occupy moist, shady positions in rock crevices and beneath overhangs. The soils are shallow sandy loams, containing accumulated organic material, that have water percolating through them in winter.

== Conservation ==
The species has a restricted area of occurrence and limited population size, and is listed as Endangered under Australia's EPBC Act. The main threats include habitat degradation by invasive weeds and grazing by herbivores such as rabbits and western grey kangaroos. Another potential threat is hybridisation with the closely related Ornduffia marchantii, which has a similarly restricted range, though mostly at lower elevations, within the Porongurups.
