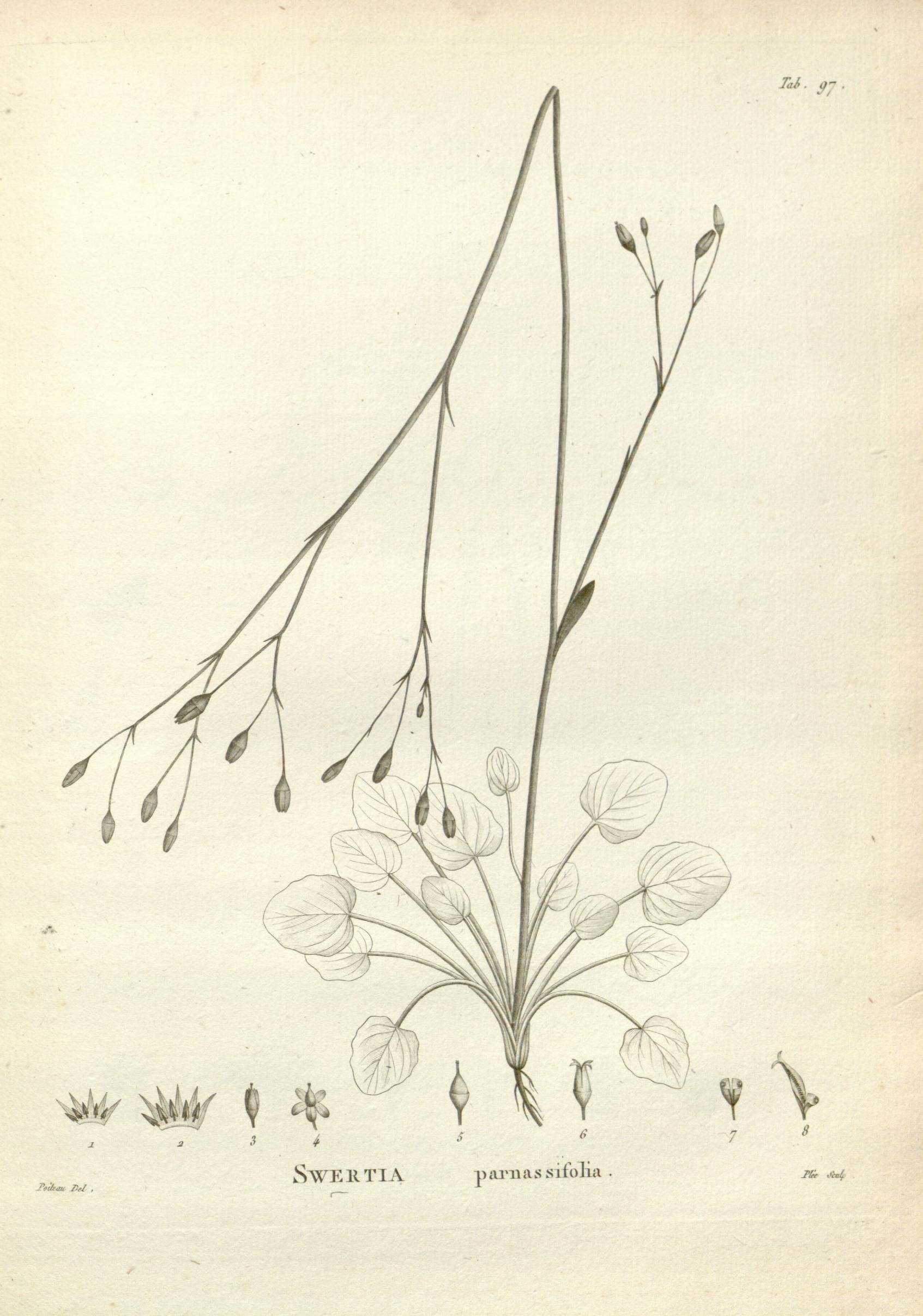
- 1804 illustration of specimen

Scientific classification
- Kingdom: Plantae
- Clade: Tracheophytes
- Clade: Angiosperms
- Clade: Eudicots
- Clade: Asterids
- Order: Asterales
- Family: Menyanthaceae
- Genus: Ornduffia
- Species: O. parnassifolia

Binomial name
- Ornduffia parnassifolia (Labill.) Tippery & Les

Synonyms
- Swertia parnassifolia Labill.; Villarsia parnassifolia (Labill.) R.Br.

= Ornduffia parnassiifolia =

Species of flowering plant

Ornduffia parnassifolia is a species of plant in the Menyanthaceae family of wetland plants that is endemic to Western Australia.

== Description ==
The species is an emergent semi-aquatic herb with bright yellow, star-shaped flowers which appear on panicles throughout the year.

== Distribution and habitat ==
The species occurs in the Esperance Plains, Jarrah Forest, Swan Coastal Plain and Warren IBRA bioregions of Southwest Australia. It is found in swamps and other seasonal wetlands along the southern coast from south of Bunbury to east of Esperance.
