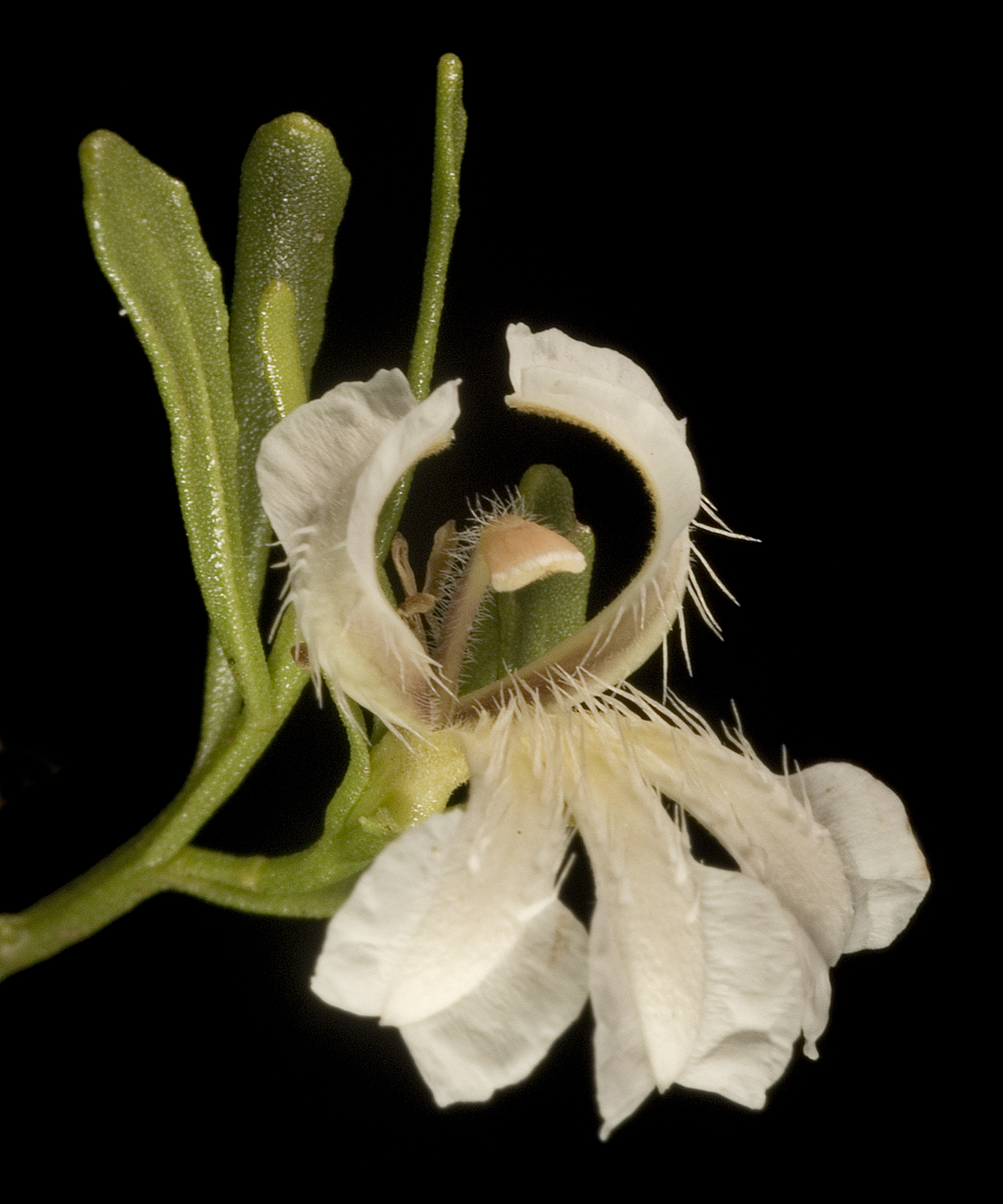

Scientific classification
- Kingdom: Plantae
- Clade: Tracheophytes
- Clade: Angiosperms
- Clade: Eudicots
- Clade: Asterids
- Order: Asterales
- Family: Goodeniaceae
- Genus: Coopernookia
- Species: C. strophiolata

Binomial name
- Coopernookia strophiolata (F.Muell.) Carolin.

Synonyms
- Goodenia strophiolata F.Muell.

= Coopernookia strophiolata =

Species of flowering plant

Coopernookia strophiolata is a shrub in the Goodeniaceae family, endemic to Australia and found in both Western Australia and South Australia.

== Description ==
Coopernookia strophiolata is a sticky, spreading (sometimes straggly) shrub growing from heights of 30 cm to 1.2 m. The leaves are obovate, spoon-shaped or elliptic, narrowing gradually towards the base, and have toothed margins and a few star-shaped hairs. The leaf blades are 10 to 35 mm long by 2 to 15 mm wide. The stalks of the inflorescence are up to 12 mm long. The sepals are 3 to 7 mm long, and joined to the ovary towards the base. The white dark-veined corolla is up to 12 mm long and has stellate hairs on the outside. The lobes are unequal and the adaxial lobes have bristles near their posterior margins. The capsule is globular and 5 to 7 mm in diameter. The seeds (3 mm long) are ellipsoidal.

== Taxonomy and naming ==
The species was first described as Goodenia strophiolata by Ferdinand von Mueller in 1859 in Fragmenta Phytographiae Australiae. It was transferred to the newly described genus, Coopernookia by Roger Carolin in 1968.

== Distribution and habitat ==
Coopernookia strophiolata occurs on sands, clays and stony soils. In Western Australia it is found in Beard's Eremaean and South-West Provinces, and in South Australia, near Maralinga and on the Eyre Peninsula.
