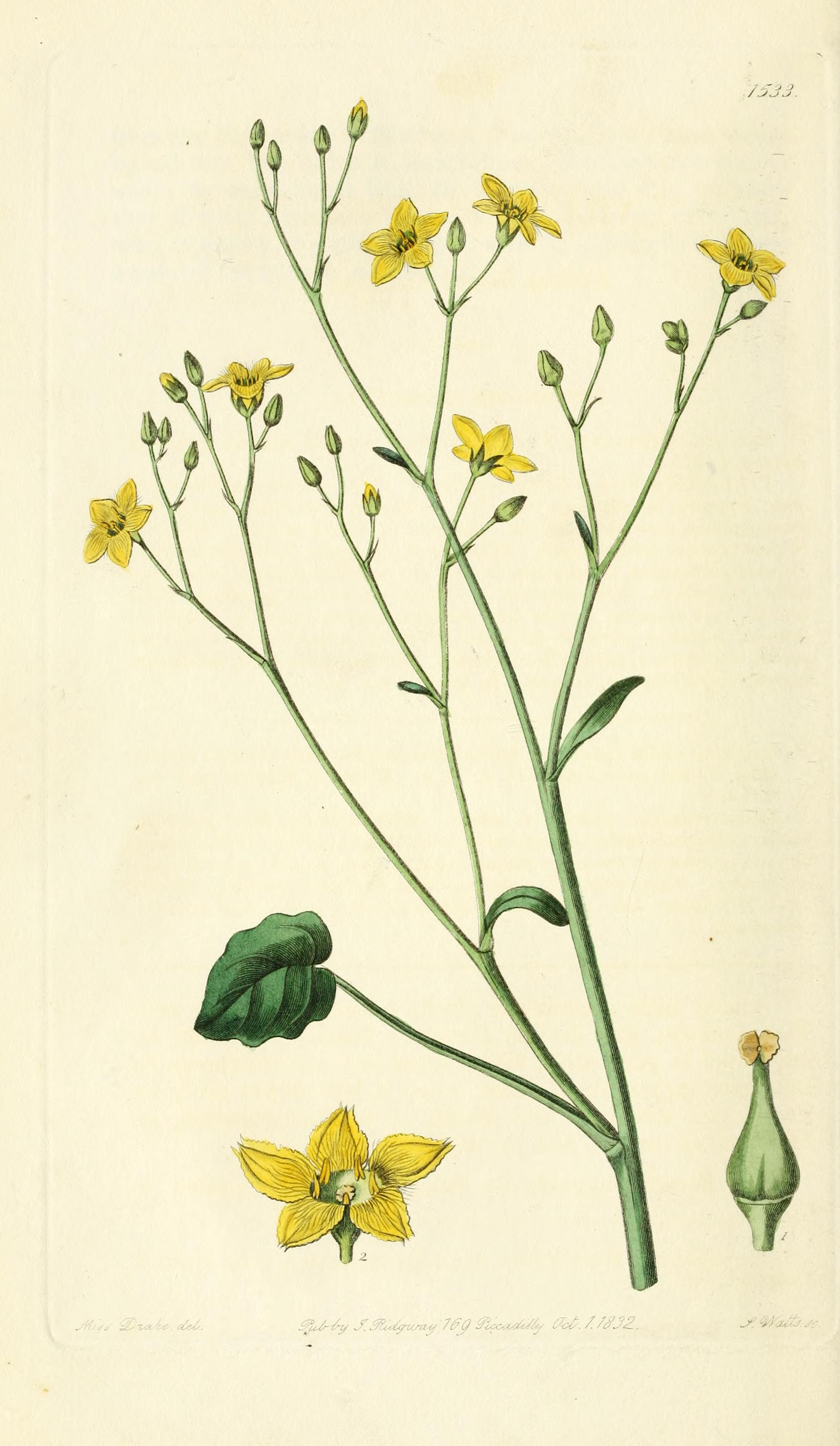
- 1820s illustration
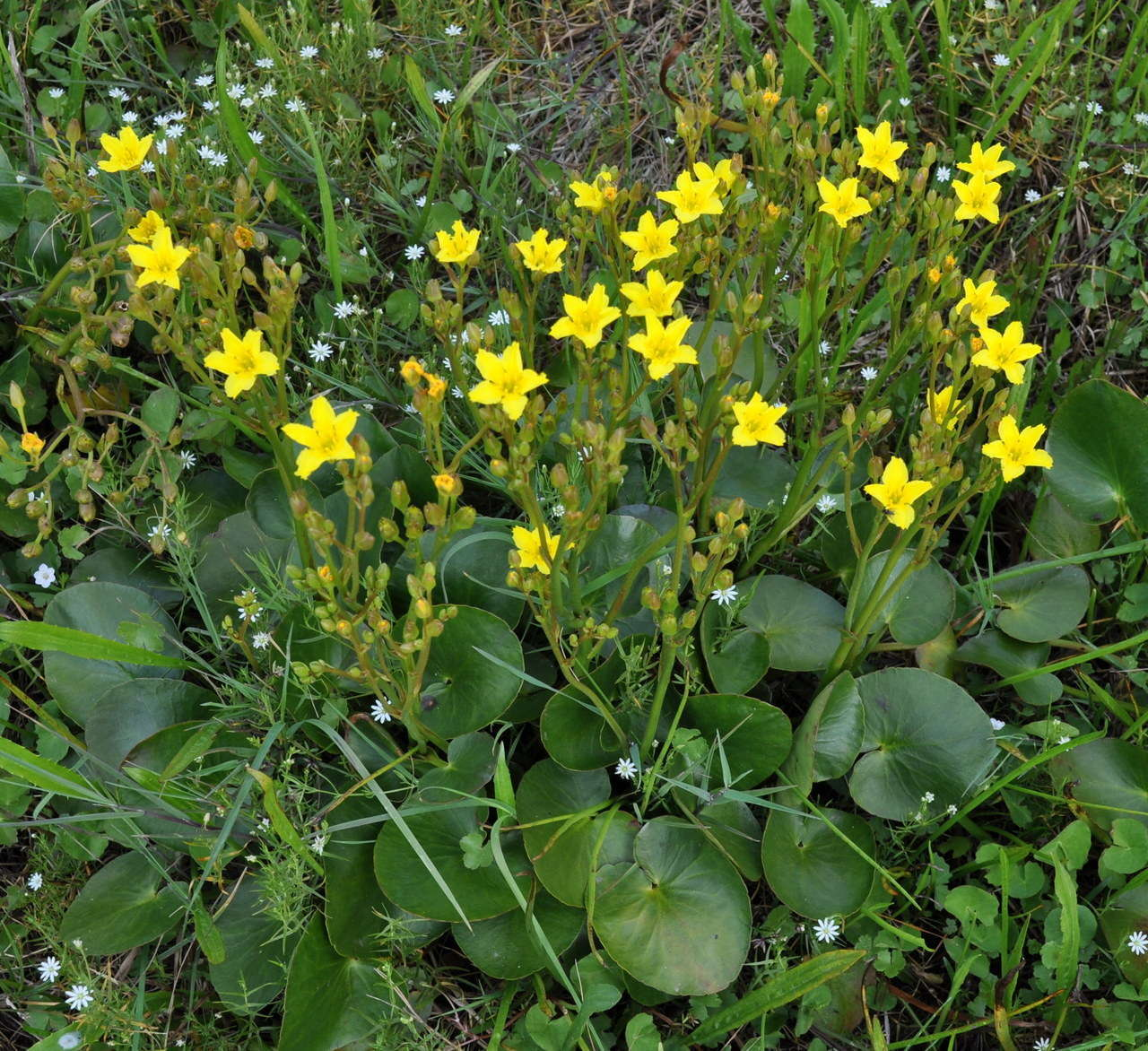
- Living specimen

Scientific classification
- Kingdom: Plantae
- Clade: Tracheophytes
- Clade: Angiosperms
- Clade: Eudicots
- Clade: Asterids
- Order: Asterales
- Family: Menyanthaceae
- Genus: Ornduffia
- Species: O. reniformis

Binomial name
- Ornduffia reniformis (R.Br.) Tippery & Les

Synonyms
- Villarsia reniformis R.Br.; Villarsia parnassiifolia var. reniformis (R. Br.) Griseb.

= Ornduffia reniformis =

Species of flowering plant

Ornduffia reniformis, also known as the running marsh-flower, is a species of plant in the Menyanthaceae family of wetland plants that is endemic to Australia.

== Description ==
The species is an emergent, aquatic, perennial herb that grows to a height of 1.3 m. It has round to reniform (kidney-shaped), glossy green, floating leaves 3–12 mm across. The yellow flowers, which appear on erect panicles from October to March, are 6.5–12 mm long and 19–43 mm in diameter. The seed capsules are 6–12 mm long, with fruiting taking place mainly from October to April.

== Distribution and habitat ==
The range of the species includes parts of Queensland, New South Wales, South Australia, Victoria and Tasmania, where it inhabits freshwater wetlands, including temporarily flooded depressions.
