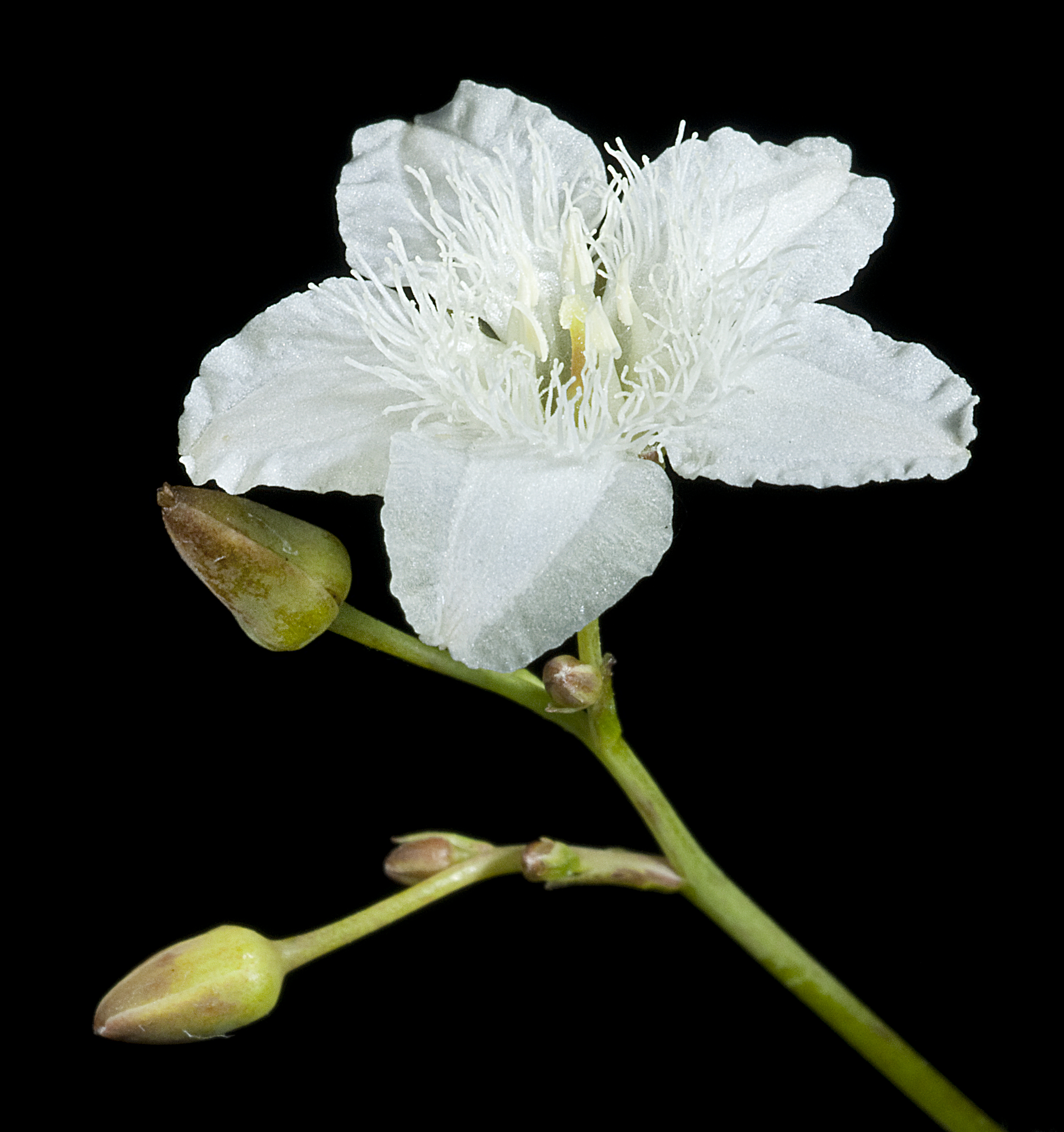
- Flower

Scientific classification
- Kingdom: Plantae
- Clade: Tracheophytes
- Clade: Angiosperms
- Clade: Eudicots
- Clade: Asterids
- Order: Asterales
- Family: Menyanthaceae
- Genus: Ornduffia
- Species: O. albiflora

Binomial name
- Ornduffia albiflora (F.Muell.) Tippery & Les

Synonyms
- Villarsia albiflora F. Muell.

= Ornduffia albiflora =

Species of flowering plant

Ornduffia calthifolia is a species of plant in the Menyanthaceae family of wetland plants that is endemic to Western Australia.

== Description ==
The species is a marsh inhabitant; it grows as an erect, aquatic or semiaquatic, perennial herb to a height of 0.4–1.2& m. The white flowers appear from September to December.

== Distribution and habitat ==
The species occurs in the Avon Wheatbelt, Jarrah Forest, Swan Coastal Plain and Warren IBRA bioregions of Southwest Australia. It is found in wetlands such as freshwater lakes and swamps.
