= Ornduffia umbricola =

Scientific classification
- Kingdom: Plantae
- Clade: Tracheophytes
- Clade: Angiosperms
- Clade: Eudicots
- Clade: Asterids
- Order: Asterales
- Family: Menyanthaceae
- Genus: Ornduffia
- Species: O. umbricola

Binomial name
- Ornduffia umbricola (Aston) Tippery & Les

Synonyms
- Villarsia umbricola Aston

Species of flowering plant

Ornduffia umbricola, also known as the lax marsh-flower, is a species of plant in the Menyanthaceae family of wetland plants that is endemic to Australia. There are two recognised varieties.

== Varieties ==
- Ornduffia umbricola var. umbricola (Aston) Tippery & Les
- Ornduffia umbricola var. beaugleholei (Aston) Tippery & Les

== Description ==
The species is a slender, tufted, perennial (occasionally annual) herb that grows up to 105 cm in height. The round leaves are 1–12 cm across. The yellow flowers are 11–31 mm in diameter with 4–6 (usually 5) lobes. The seed capsules are 5–11 mm long. The flowers and fruits appear mainly from November to April.

== Distribution and habitat ==
The species occurs in western Victoria, south-eastern South Australia and Tasmania. It is found in semi-shaded sites on damp sandy or peaty soils, or in shallow freshwater wetlands, sometimes in water up to 45 cm deep.
