= Ornduffia submersa =

Scientific classification
- Kingdom: Plantae
- Clade: Tracheophytes
- Clade: Angiosperms
- Clade: Eudicots
- Clade: Asterids
- Order: Asterales
- Family: Menyanthaceae
- Genus: Ornduffia
- Species: O. submersa

Binomial name
- Ornduffia submersa (Aston) Tippery & Les

Synonyms
- Villarsia submersa Aston

Species of flowering plant

Ornduffia submersa is a species of plant in the Menyanthaceae family of wetland plants that is endemic to Western Australia.

== Distribution and habitat ==
The species occurs within the Avon Wheatbelt, Esperance Plains, Jarrah Forest, Swan Coastal Plain and Warren IBRA bioregions of Southwest Australia.
