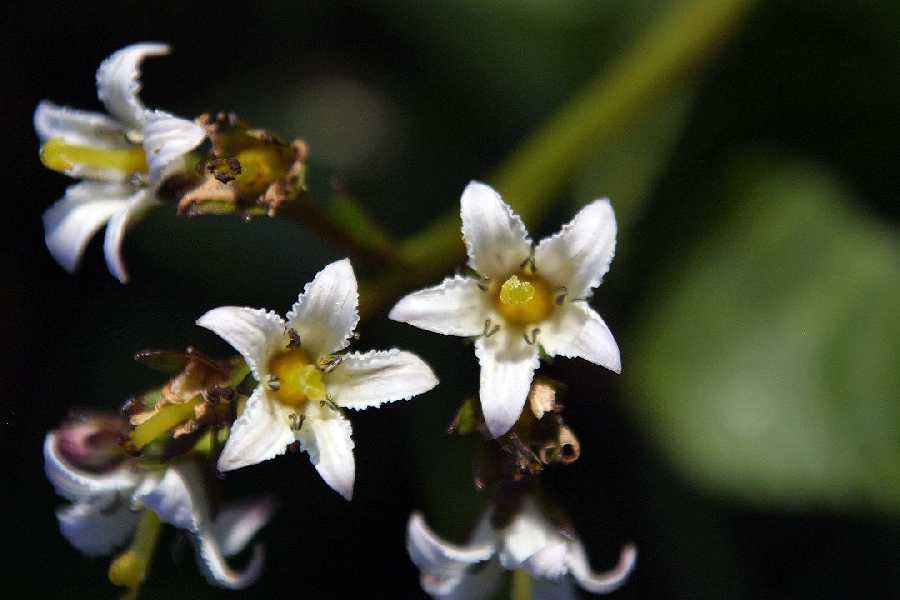

Scientific classification
- Kingdom: Plantae
- Clade: Tracheophytes
- Clade: Angiosperms
- Clade: Eudicots
- Clade: Asterids
- Order: Asterales
- Family: Menyanthaceae
- Genus: Nephrophyllidium; Gilg 1895
- Species: N. crista-galli

Binomial name
- Nephrophyllidium crista-galli (Menz. ex Hook.) Gilg

Synonyms
- Fauria Franch.; Menyanthes crista-galli Menzies ex Hook.

= Nephrophyllidium =

Genus of flowering plants

Nephrophyllidium is a monotypic genus of aquatic flowering plants in the family Menyanthaceae. The sole species is Nephrophyllidium crista-galli. They are wetland plants with basal reniform and crenate leaves. Flowers are five-parted and white, and the petals are adorned with lateral wings and a midline keel. Nephrophyllidium is most nearly related to Menyanthes, which is very similar in habit. The genus name is derived from the kidney-shaped leaves (Greek: nephros = kidney and phyllon = leaf), and the specific epithet refers to the curled petal edges (Latin: crista galli = cockscomb).

Nephrophyllidium crista-galli is found in the Pacific Northwest of America, and in Japan, where it can be called subspecies japonicum (Franch.) Yonek. & H.Ohashi. Nephrophyllidium is commonly known as deer cabbage.

The IAPT determined that a prior synonym for the genus, Fauria Franch., too closely resembled the genus Faurea (Proteaceae), and thus conserved Nephrophyllidium as the accepted genus name.
