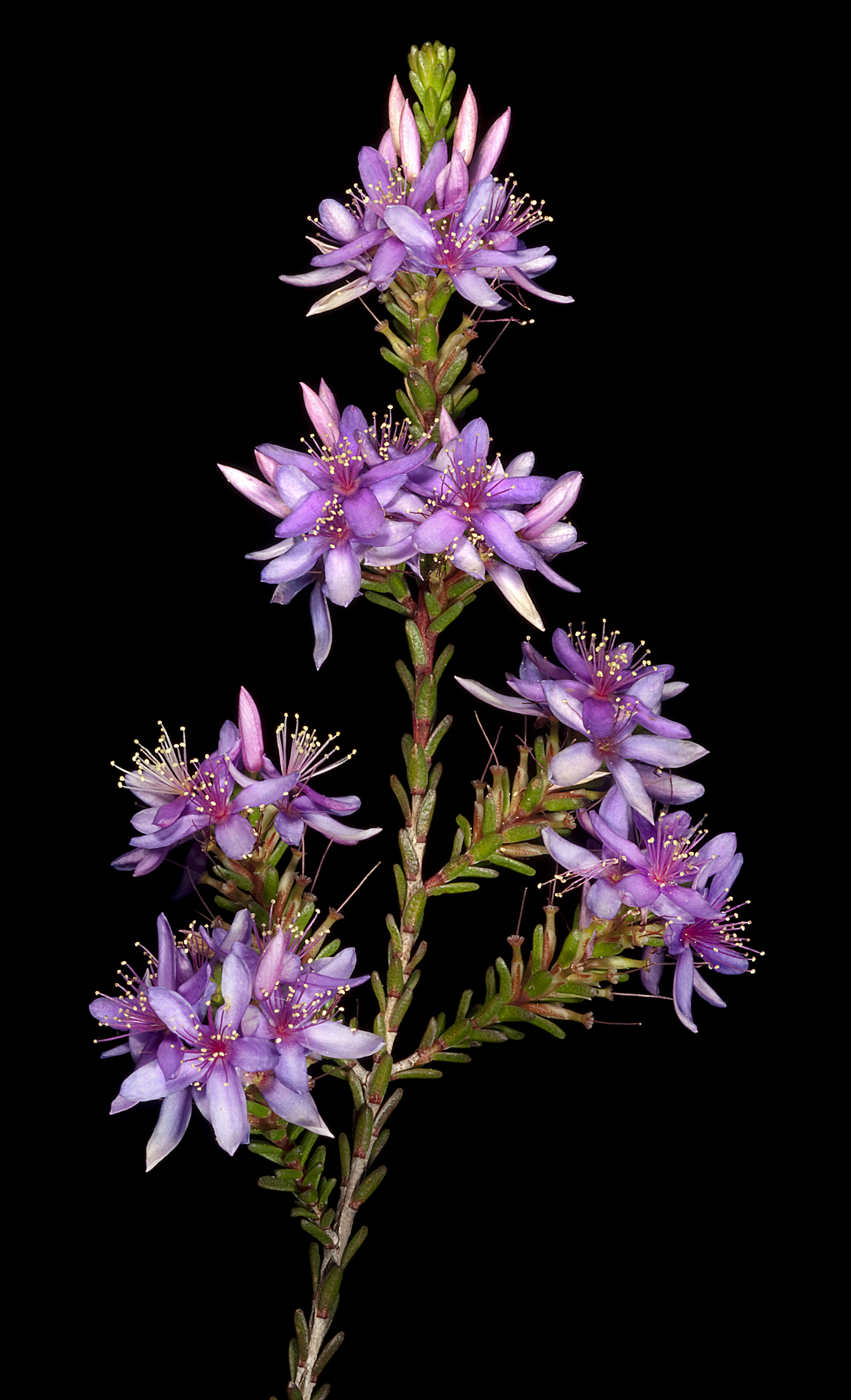

Scientific classification
- Kingdom: Plantae
- Clade: Tracheophytes
- Clade: Angiosperms
- Clade: Eudicots
- Clade: Rosids
- Order: Myrtales
- Family: Myrtaceae
- Genus: Calytrix
- Species: C. sylvana

Binomial name
- Calytrix sylvana Craven

= Calytrix sylvana =

Species of flowering plant

Calytrix sylvana is a species of flowering plant in the myrtle family Myrtaceae and is endemic to the south-west of Western Australia. It is a glabrous shrub with egg-shaped, elliptic or linear leaves and purple, purplish-mauve or pink flowers with about 20 to 25 stamens in several rows.

== Description ==
Calytrix sylvana is a glabrous shrub that typically grows to a height of up to 1 m (3 ft 3 in) and grows from the tips of the flowering stems. Its leaves are egg-shaped, elliptic or linear, 1–4 mm (0.039–0.157 in) long, 0.5–1.25 mm (0.020–0.049 in) wide and sessile or on a petiole up to 0.4 mm (0.016 in) long, with no stipules. The flowers are arranged singly or in many scattered groups on a peduncle 2.5–3.25 mm (0.098–0.128 in) long with elliptic lobes 1.50–1.75 mm (0.059–0.069 in) long. The floral tube is more or less spindle-shaped, 2.5–3.5 mm (0.098–0.138 in) long and has ten ribs. The sepals are oblong, 0.20–0.25 mm (0.0079–0.0098 in) long and 0.3–0.4 mm (0.012–0.016 in) wide without awns. The petals are purple, purplish-mauve or pink and there are 20 to 25 stamens in two or three rows with white filaments that become reddish-purple later. Flowering occurs from August to October.

== Taxonomy ==
This species was first formally described in 1844 by Johannes Conrad Schauer who gave it the name Lhotskya brevifolia in the Lehmann's Plantae Preissianae from specimens collected by James Drummond near the Swan River Colony. In 1987, Lyndley Craven transferred the species to Calytrix as C. sylvana in the journal Australian Systematic Botany. The specific epithet ("sylvana") means 'belonging to a forest or wood'.

== Distribution and habitat ==
This species of Calytrix grows in open forest with Eucalyptus marginata and Eucalyptus wandoo woodland in lateritic or sandy soil in the New Norcia-Bindoon district in the Avon Wheatbelt, Jarrah Forest, Swan Coastal Plain bioregions of south-western Western Australia.

== Conservation status ==
Calytrix sylvana is listed as "not threatened" by the Government of Western Australia Department of Biodiversity, Conservation and Attractions.
