= Coopernookia scabridiuscula =

Conservation status
- Vulnerable (NCA)

Scientific classification
- Kingdom: Plantae
- Clade: Tracheophytes
- Clade: Angiosperms
- Clade: Eudicots
- Clade: Asterids
- Order: Asterales
- Family: Goodeniaceae
- Genus: Coopernookia
- Species: C. scabridiuscula

Binomial name
- Coopernookia scabridiuscula Carolin, 1980

Species of flowering plant

Coopernookia scabridiuscula, often commonly referred to simply as coopernookia, is a species of shrub in the family Goodeniaceae that is endemic to Queensland in Australia, with known occurrences restricted to the Scenic Rim and Wide Bay Burnett regions. It is uncommon and classified as Vulnerable under the Nature Conservation Act 1992.
