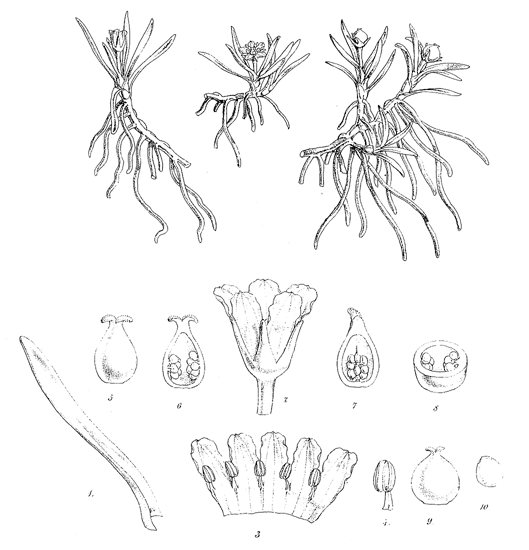
- Illustration of Liparophyllum gunnii Hook.f. from J. D. Hooker, Flora Tasmaniae, vol. 1 (1860)

Scientific classification
- Kingdom: Plantae
- Clade: Embryophytes
- Clade: Tracheophytes
- Clade: Angiosperms
- Clade: Eudicots
- Clade: Asterids
- Order: Asterales
- Family: Menyanthaceae
- Genus: Liparophyllum
- Species: L. gunnii

Binomial name
- Liparophyllum gunnii Hook.f.

Synonyms
- Limnanthemum gunnii Hook.f (possible); Villarsia gunnii Hook.f (possible)

= Liparophyllum gunnii =

Alpine marshwort

Species of flowering plant

Liparophyllum gunnii, commonly known as alpine marshwort, is a species of aquatic flowering plants in the family Menyanthaceae. It is the type for the genus Liparophyllum. It is a wetland plant having a rhizomatous root structure and alternate linear leaves. Its flowers occur singly, are five-petalled, and white. Flowers bud and open from December to February; fruits form from December through April. L. gunnii is indigenous to Tasmania and New Zealand.

The specific epithet "gunnii" honors Ronald Campbell Gunn, the collector of the type specimen of this plant.
