= Verreauxia =

Verreauxia is the scientific name of two genera of organisms and may refer to:

- Verreauxia (bird), a genus of birds in the family Picidae
- Verreauxia (plant), a genus of plants in the family Goodeniaceae
