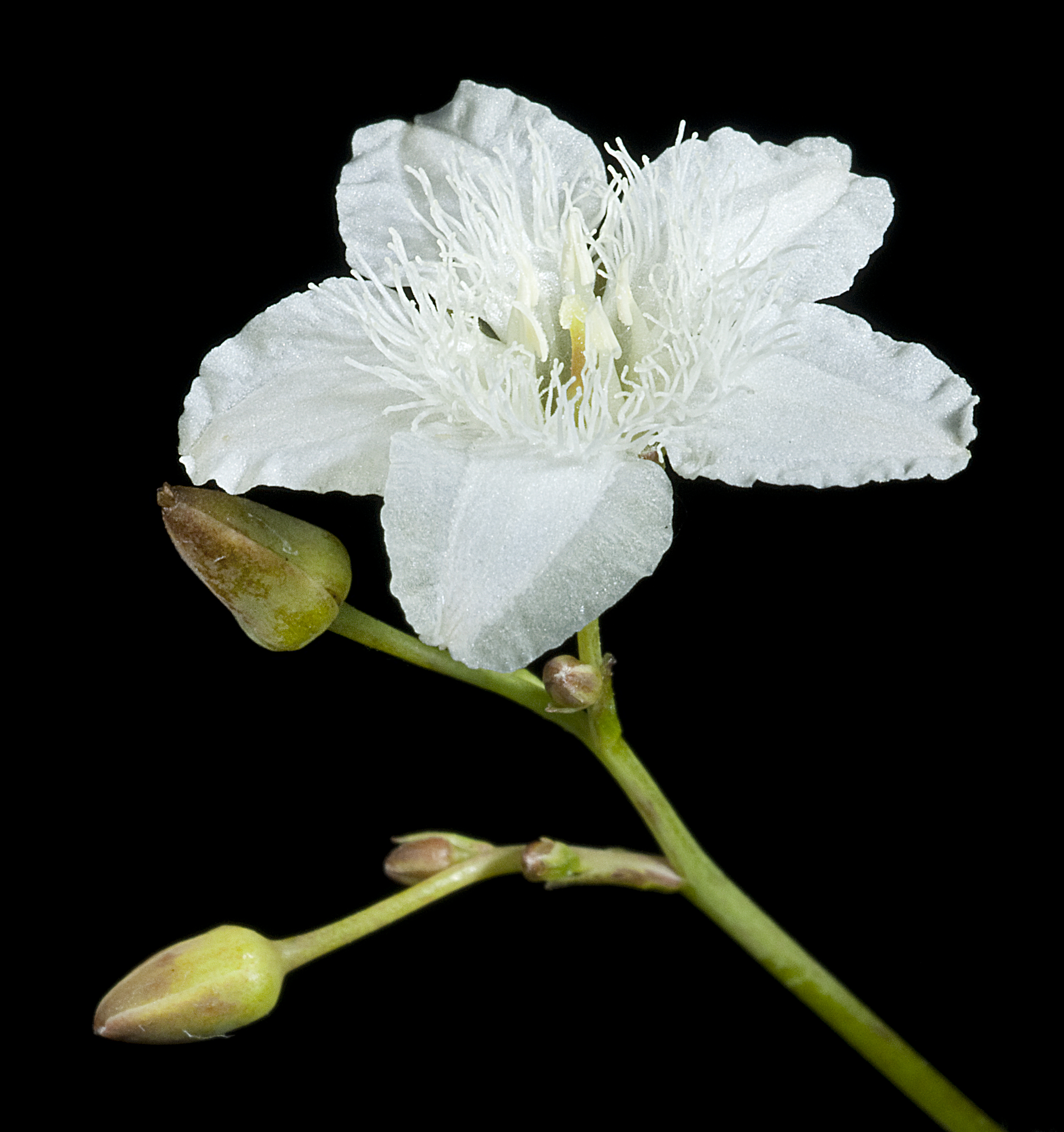
- Ornduffia albiflora

Scientific classification
- Kingdom: Plantae
- Clade: Tracheophytes
- Clade: Angiosperms
- Clade: Eudicots
- Clade: Asterids
- Order: Asterales
- Family: Menyanthaceae
- Genus: Ornduffia; Tippery & Les

Species
- See text

= Ornduffia =

Genus of Menyanthaceae plants

Ornduffia is a genus of flowering plants in the family Menyanthaceae, native to Australia. Aquatic or wetland herbs, they were split off from Villarsia in 2009.

== Species ==
Currently accepted species include:

- Ornduffia albiflora (F.Muell.) Tippery & Les
- Ornduffia calthifolia (F.Muell.) Tippery & Les
- Ornduffia marchantii (Ornduff) Tippery & Les
- Ornduffia parnassiifolia (Labill.) Tippery & Les
- Ornduffia reniformis (R.Br.) Tippery & Les
- Ornduffia submersa (Aston) Tippery & Les
- Ornduffia umbricola (Aston) Tippery & Les
