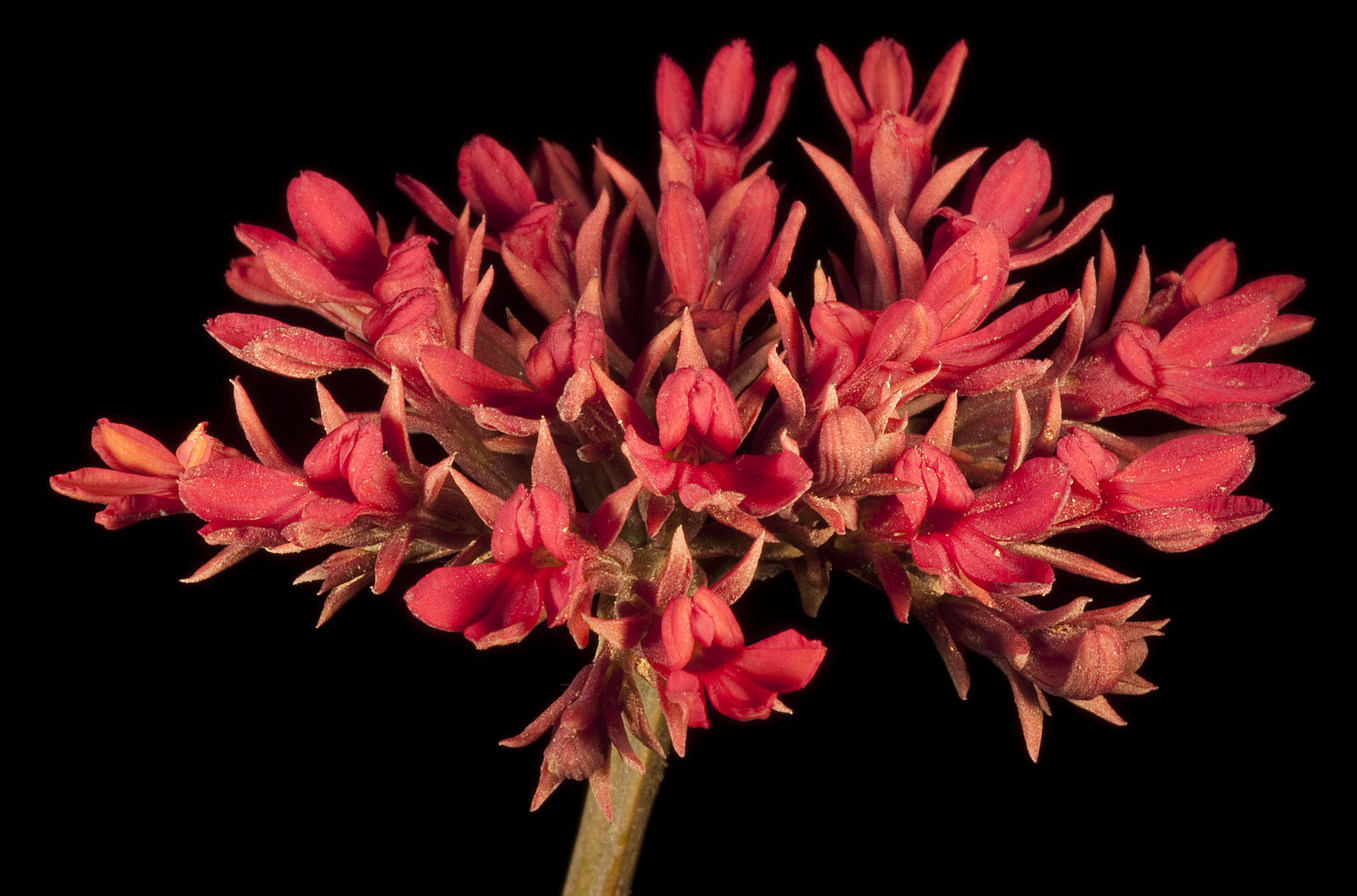

Scientific classification
- Kingdom: Plantae
- Clade: Tracheophytes
- Clade: Angiosperms
- Clade: Eudicots
- Clade: Asterids
- Order: Asterales
- Family: Goodeniaceae
- Genus: Anthotium; R.Br.

Species
- See text

= Anthotium =

Genus of flowering plants

Anthotium is a small genus of 3 or 4 species in the family Goodeniaceae which are found only in southwestern Australia.

Accepted species

Four species are accepted:

- Anthotium humile R.Br.
- Anthotium junciforme (de Vriese) D.A.Morrison
- Anthotium odontophyllum L.W.Sage
- Anthotium rubriflorum F.Muell. ex Benth.
