= Diaspasis =

Scientific classification
- Kingdom: Plantae
- Clade: Tracheophytes
- Clade: Angiosperms
- Clade: Eudicots
- Clade: Asterids
- Order: Asterales
- Family: Goodeniaceae
- Genus: Diaspasis; R.Br.
- Species: D. filifolia

Binomial name
- Diaspasis filifolia R.Br.

Genus of flowering plants

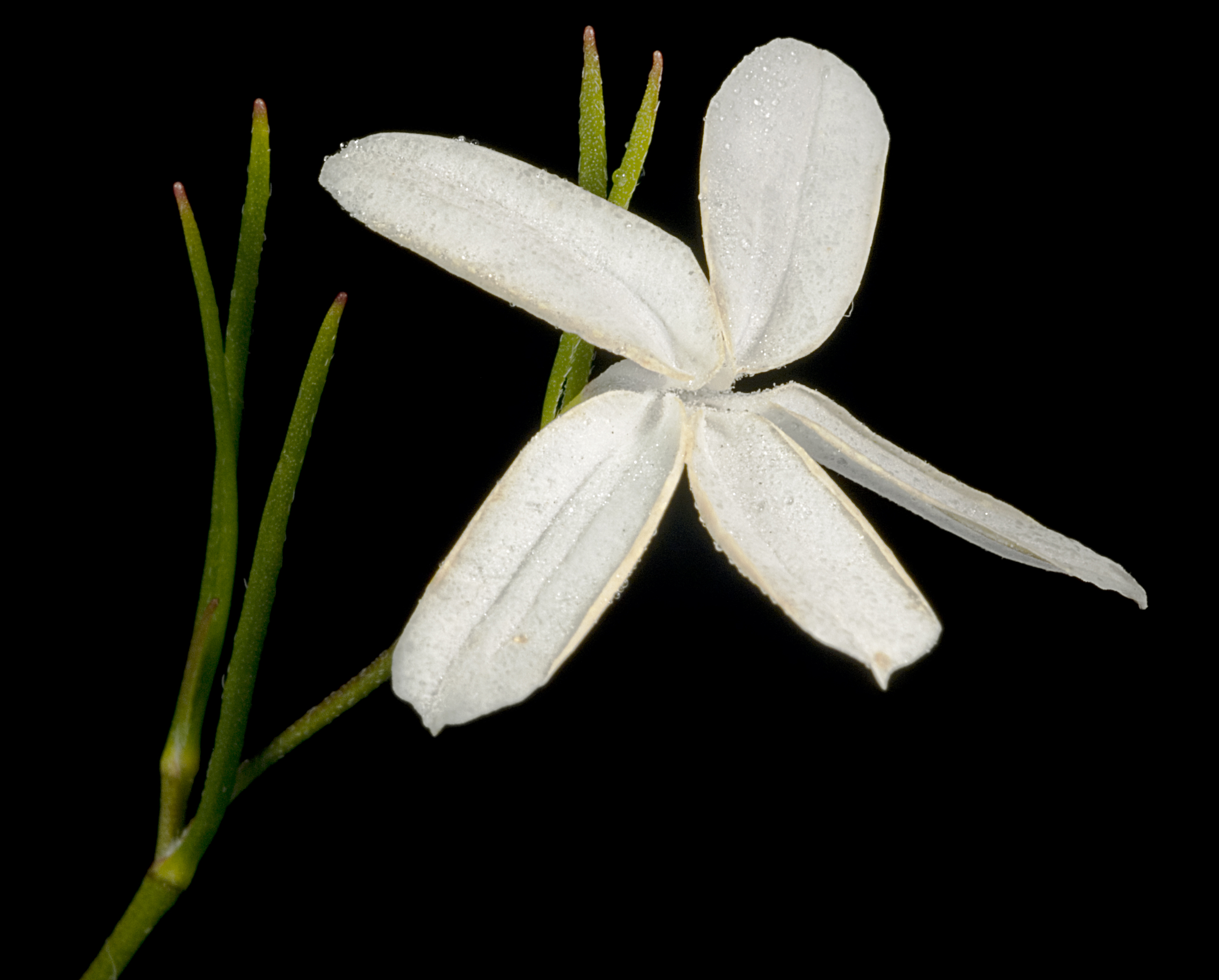
Diaspasis filifolia

Diaspasis is a genus consisting of a single species—Diaspasis filifolia—in the family Goodeniaceae native to southwestern Australia.
