= Ornduffia marchantii =

Scientific classification
- Kingdom: Plantae
- Clade: Embryophytes
- Clade: Tracheophytes
- Clade: Angiosperms
- Clade: Eudicots
- Clade: Asterids
- Order: Asterales
- Family: Menyanthaceae
- Genus: Ornduffia
- Species: O. marchantii

Binomial name
- Ornduffia marchantii (Ornduff) Tippery & Les

Synonyms
- Villarsia marchantii Ornduff

Species of flowering plant

Ornduffia marchantii is a species of plant in the Menyanthaceae family of wetland plants that is endemic to Western Australia.

== Distribution and habitat ==
The species occurs in the Jarrah Forest IBRA bioregion of Southwest Australia. There, its distribution is limited to the Porongurup Range, where it occurs in disturbed habitats in karri forest on wet loamy soils.
