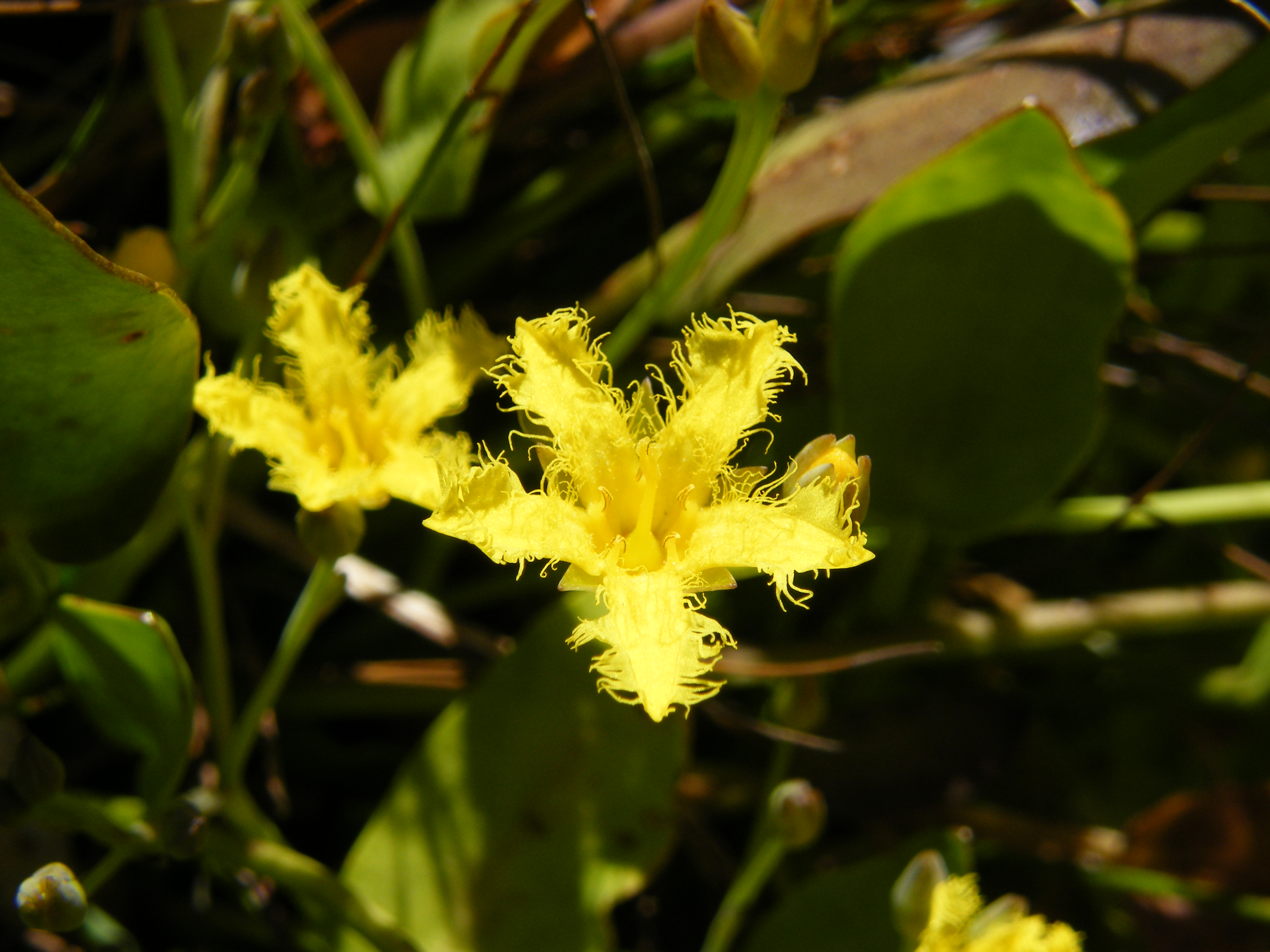
- Villarsia capensis

Scientific classification
- Kingdom: Plantae
- Clade: Tracheophytes
- Clade: Angiosperms
- Clade: Eudicots
- Clade: Asterids
- Order: Asterales
- Family: Menyanthaceae
- Genus: Villarsia; Vent. 1803

Species
- See text

= Villarsia =

Genus of aquatic plants

Villarsia is a genus of aquatic flowering plants in the family Menyanthaceae. The genus is named for the French botanist Dominique Villars (1745–1814). Villarsia are wetland plants with basal leaves. The inflorescence is a branched panicle with numerous flowers. Flowers are five-parted, either yellow or white, and the petals are adorned with wings. A number of its Australian species were reassigned to Ornduffia.

Villarsia is largely restricted to Australia, but some species are found in Southeast Asia, and V. capensis and others exist in South Africa. The geographic distribution of species is given below:

South Africa:

- Villarsia capensis (Houtt.) Merr.
- Villarsia goldblattiana Ornduff
- Villarsia manningiana Ornduff

Southeast Asia:

- Villarsia cambodiana Hance (synonym: V. rhomboidalis Dop)

Eastern Australia:

- Villarsia exaltata (Sol. ex Sims) G.Don (synonym: Liparophyllum exaltatum)

Western Australia:

- Villarsia capitata Nees
- Villarsia congestiflora F.Muell.
- Villarsia lasiosperma F.Muell.
- Villarsia latifolia Benth.
- Villarsia violifolia F.Muell.
