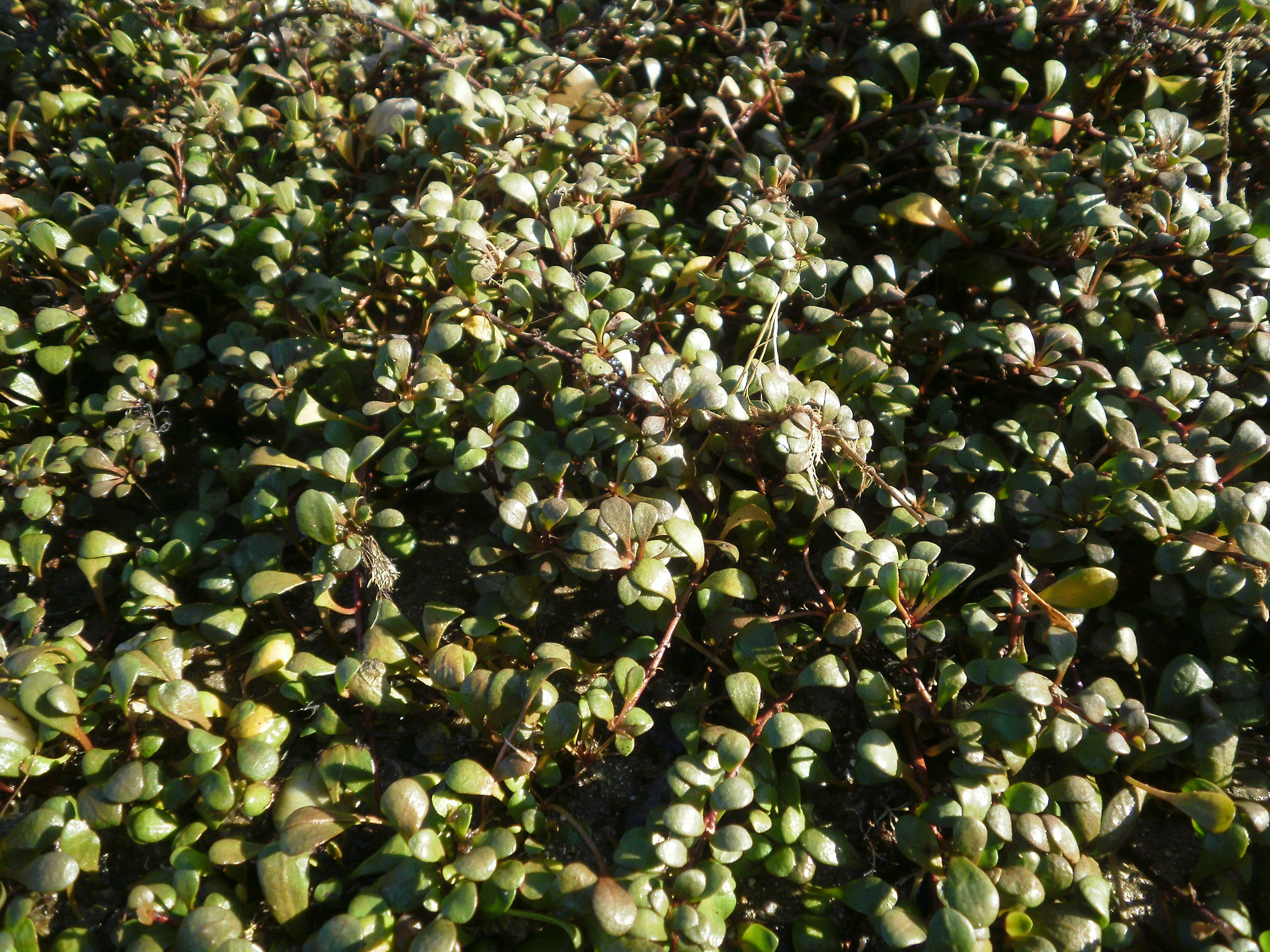
- Selliera radicans

Scientific classification
- Kingdom: Plantae
- Clade: Tracheophytes
- Clade: Angiosperms
- Clade: Eudicots
- Clade: Asterids
- Order: Asterales
- Family: Goodeniaceae
- Genus: Selliera; Cav.

Species
- See text

= Selliera =

Genus of herbs

Selliera is a genus of herbs in the family Goodeniaceae.

== Species ==
- Selliera exigua F.Muell.
- Selliera fasciculata Buchanan
- Selliera herpystica Schltdl.
- Selliera koningsbergeri Backer
- Selliera microphylla Colenso
- Selliera radicans Cav.
- Selliera repens (Labill.) de Vriese
- Selliera rotundifolia Heenan
