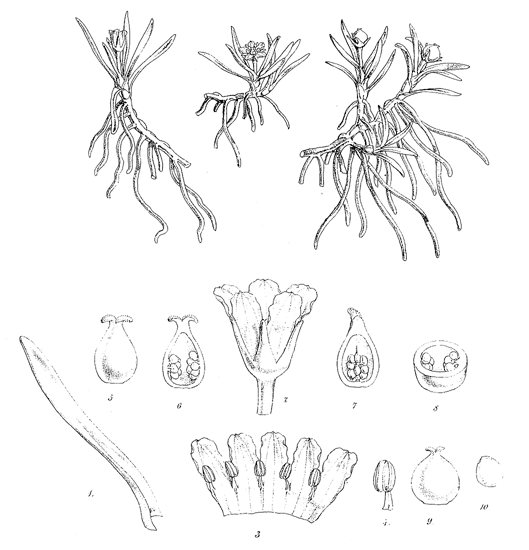
- Illustration of Liparophyllum gunnii Hook.f. from J. D. Hooker, Flora Tasmaniae, vol. 1 (1860)

Scientific classification
- Kingdom: Plantae
- Clade: Tracheophytes
- Clade: Angiosperms
- Clade: Eudicots
- Clade: Asterids
- Order: Asterales
- Family: Menyanthaceae
- Genus: Liparophyllum; Hook.f.

Species
- See text

= Liparophyllum =

Genus of flowering plants

Liparophyllum is a genus of aquatic flowering plants in the family Menyanthaceae. The name Liparophyllum comes from the Greek words liparos, meaning "fat, shiny or oily", and phyllon, meaning "leaf". They are rhizomatous wetland plants with alternate linear leaves. Flowers occur singly, and are five-parted and white.

== Selected species ==
- L. capitatum (Nees) Tippery & Les
- L. congestiflorum (F.Muell.) Tippery & Les
- L. exaltatum (Sol. ex Sims) Tippery & Les
- L. exiguum (F.Muell.) Tippery & Les
- L. gunnii Hook.f. (type)
- L. lasiospermum (F.Mueller) Tippery & Les
- L. latifolium (Benth.) Tippery & Les
- L. violifolium (F.Muell.) Tippery & Les

List source :
