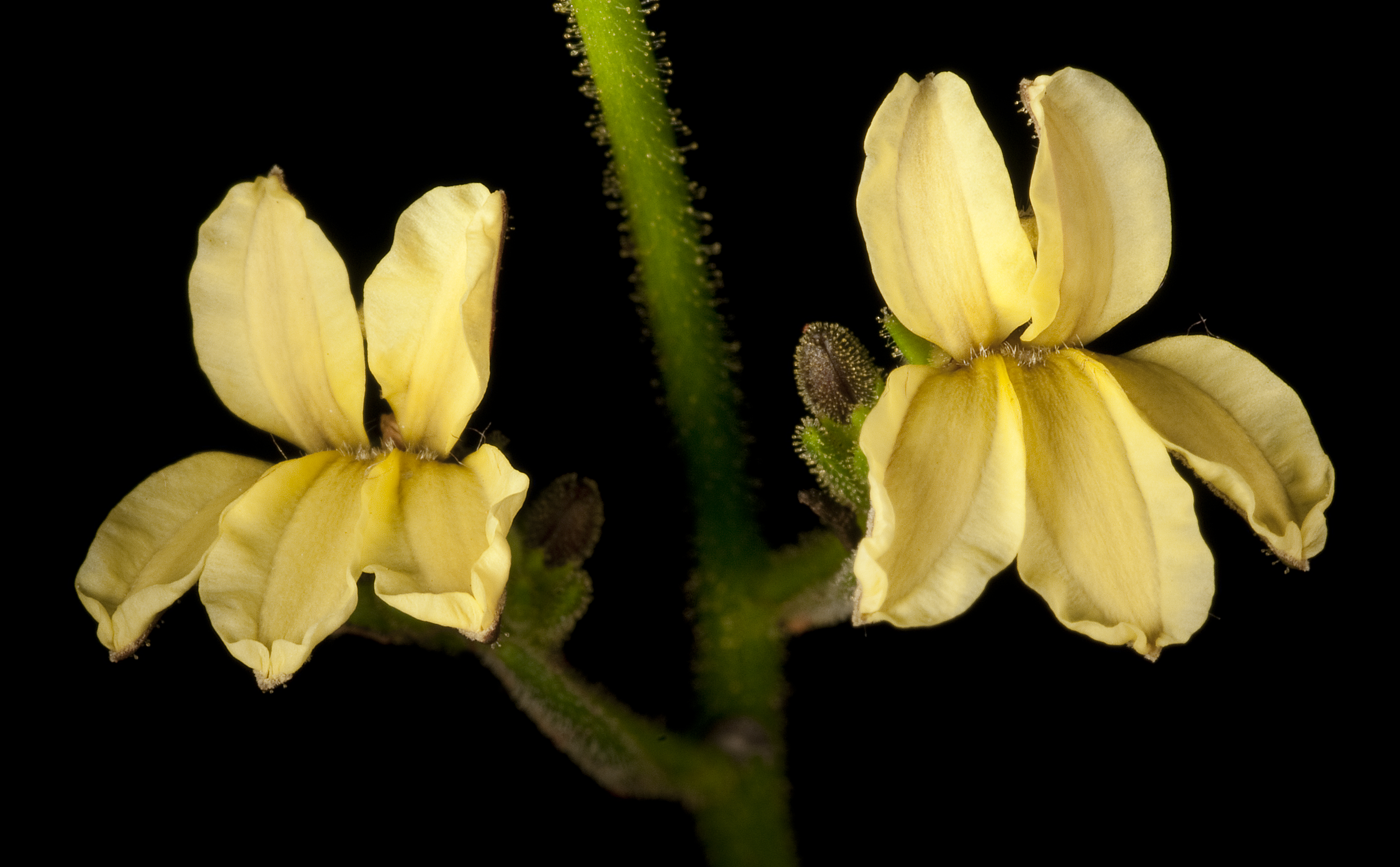

Scientific classification
- Kingdom: Plantae
- Clade: Tracheophytes
- Clade: Angiosperms
- Clade: Eudicots
- Clade: Asterids
- Order: Asterales
- Family: Goodeniaceae
- Genus: Pentaptilon; E.Pritz.
- Species: P. careyi

Binomial name
- Pentaptilon careyi (F.Muell.) E.Pritz.

= Pentaptilon =

Genus of flowering plants

Pentaptilon is a genus consisting of a single species—Pentaptilon careyi—in the family Goodeniaceae native to southwestern Australia.
