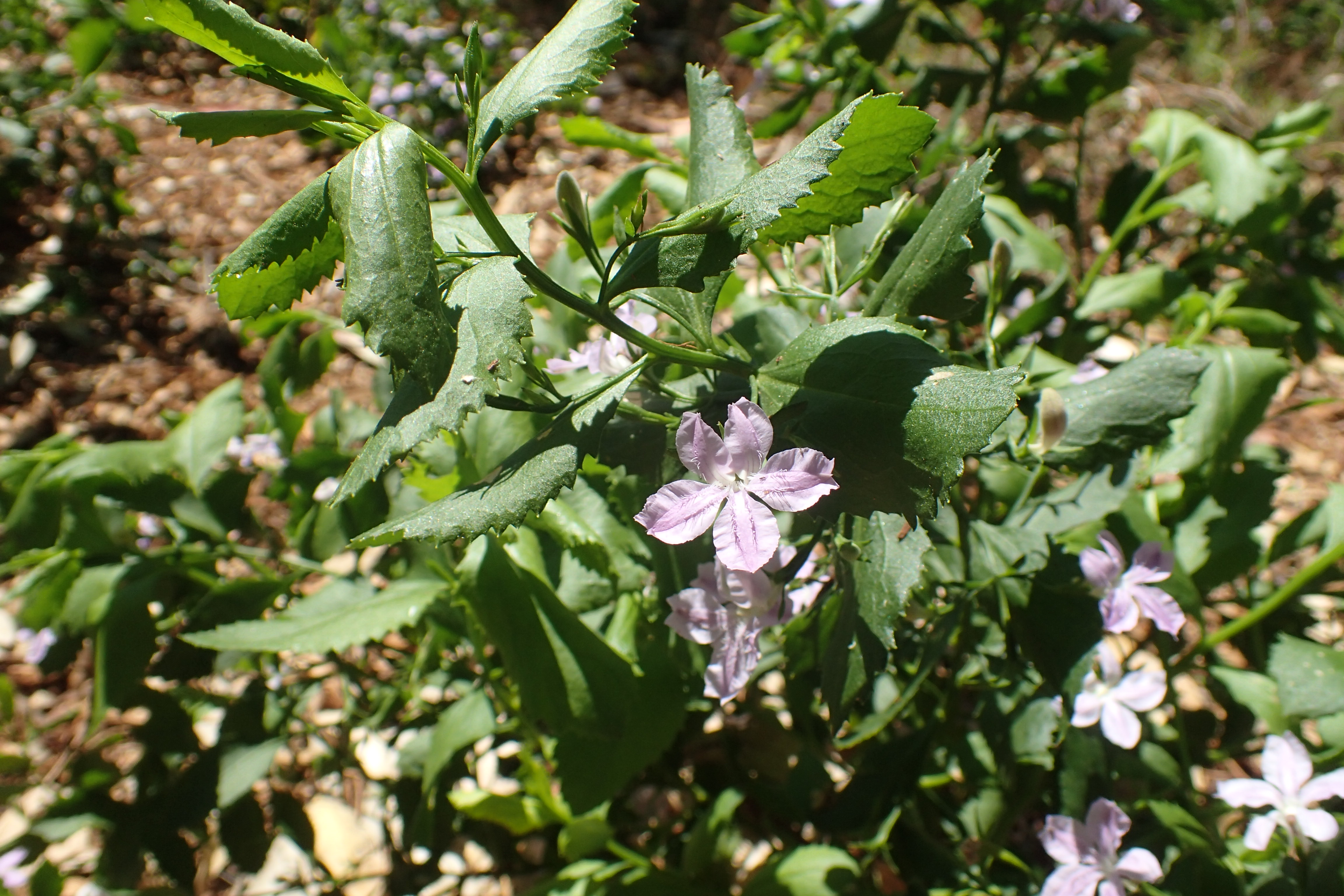
- Coopernookia georgei in Kings Park Botanic Garden

Scientific classification
- Kingdom: Plantae
- Clade: Tracheophytes
- Clade: Angiosperms
- Clade: Eudicots
- Clade: Asterids
- Order: Asterales
- Family: Goodeniaceae
- Genus: Coopernookia; Carolin

Species
- See text

= Coopernookia =

Genus of flowering plants

Coopernookia is a plant genus of six species of small perennial shrubs that are all endemic to Australia. They have hairy, often sticky leaves, and flowers with bilateral symmetry.

== Description ==
Plants in the genus Coopernookia are small shrubs covered with star-like, often glandular hairs that are often sticky. The leaves are sessile or almost so, sometimes have toothed edges and sometimes have their edges curled under. The flowers are arranged on the ends of branches, surrounded by leaves. The flowers are zygomorphic, meaning that they have bilateral symmetry. Each flower has five sepals and a white, mauve or pinkish corolla. The lobes of the corolla are unequal in size and broadly winged. The stamens are free from each other and the ovary is inferior.

== Taxonomy ==
The genus Coopernookia was first formally described in 1968 by Roger Carolin in Proceedings of the Linnean Society of New South Wales. The first species added to the new genus was Coopernookia barbata, previously known as Goodenia barbata R.Br., and it is therefore the type species. Carolin considered Coopernookia to be intermediate between Scaevola and Goodenia. The name Coopernookia refers to the Coopernook State Forest, where one of the species, C. chisholmii is common.

=== Species ===
Six species are accepted by the Australian Plant Census

- Coopernookia barbata (R.Br.) Carolin – N.S.W., Vic., Tas.(presumed extinct in Tasmania)
- Coopernookia chisholmii (Blakely) Carolin – N.S.W.
- Coopernookia georgei Carolin – W.A.
- Coopernookia polygalacea (de Vriese) Carolin – W.A.
- Coopernookia scabridiuscula Carolin – Qld.
- Coopernookia strophiolata (F.Muell.) Carolin – W.A., S.A.
