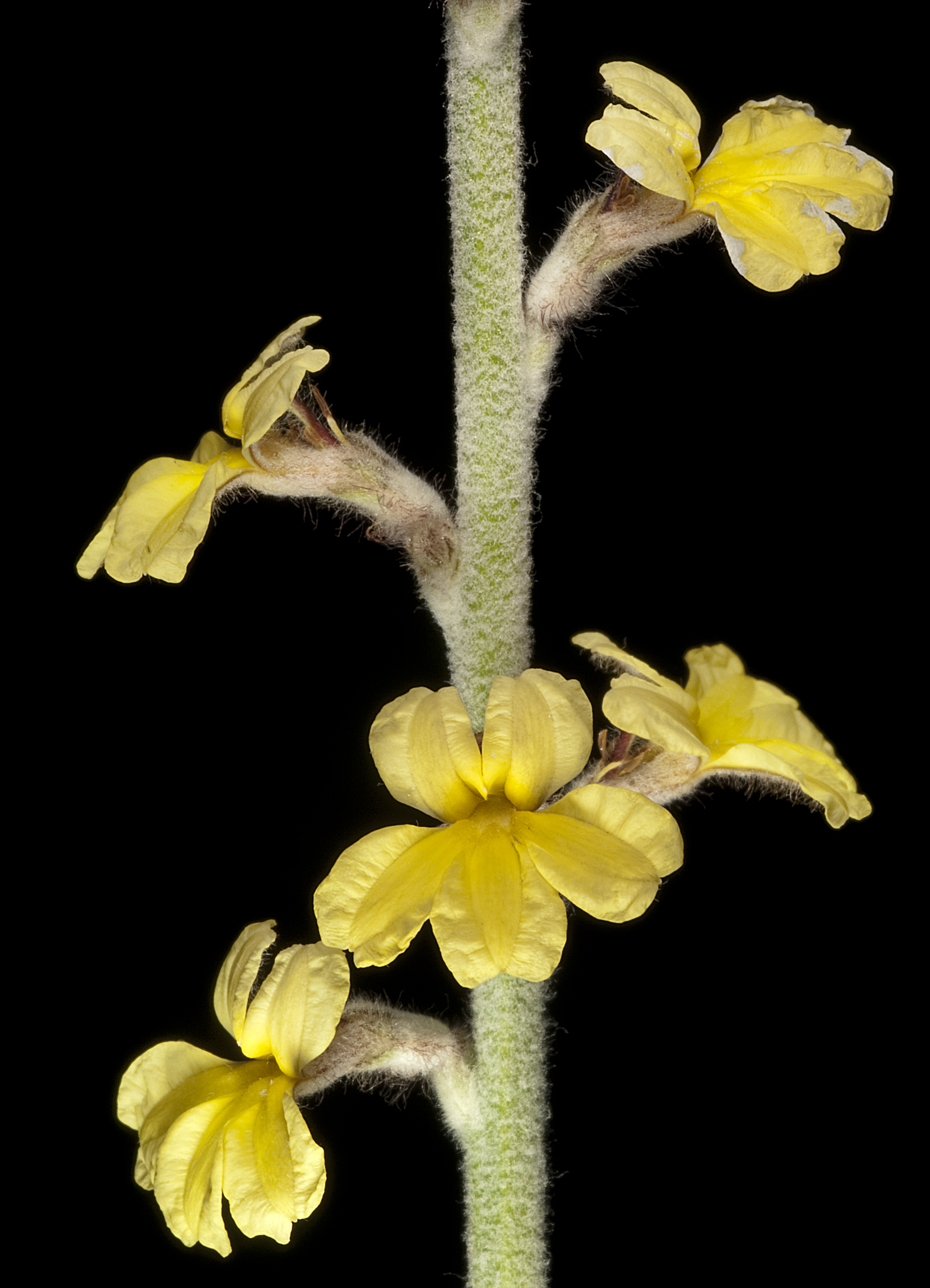
- Verreauxia reinwardtii

Scientific classification
- Kingdom: Plantae
- Clade: Tracheophytes
- Clade: Angiosperms
- Clade: Eudicots
- Clade: Asterids
- Order: Asterales
- Family: Goodeniaceae
- Genus: Verreauxia; Benth.

Species
- See text

= Verreauxia (plant) =

Genus of flowering plants

Verreauxia is a genus of plants of the family Goodeniaceae. It includes species native to Australia and surrounding islands. The genus is named after Jules P. Verreaux (1807–73), a French ornithologist and naturalist. Plants are insect-pollinated and hermaphroditic. Species include Verreauxia dyeri, Verreauxia paniculata, Verreauxia reinwardtii, Verreauxia verreauxii and Verreauxia villosa.
