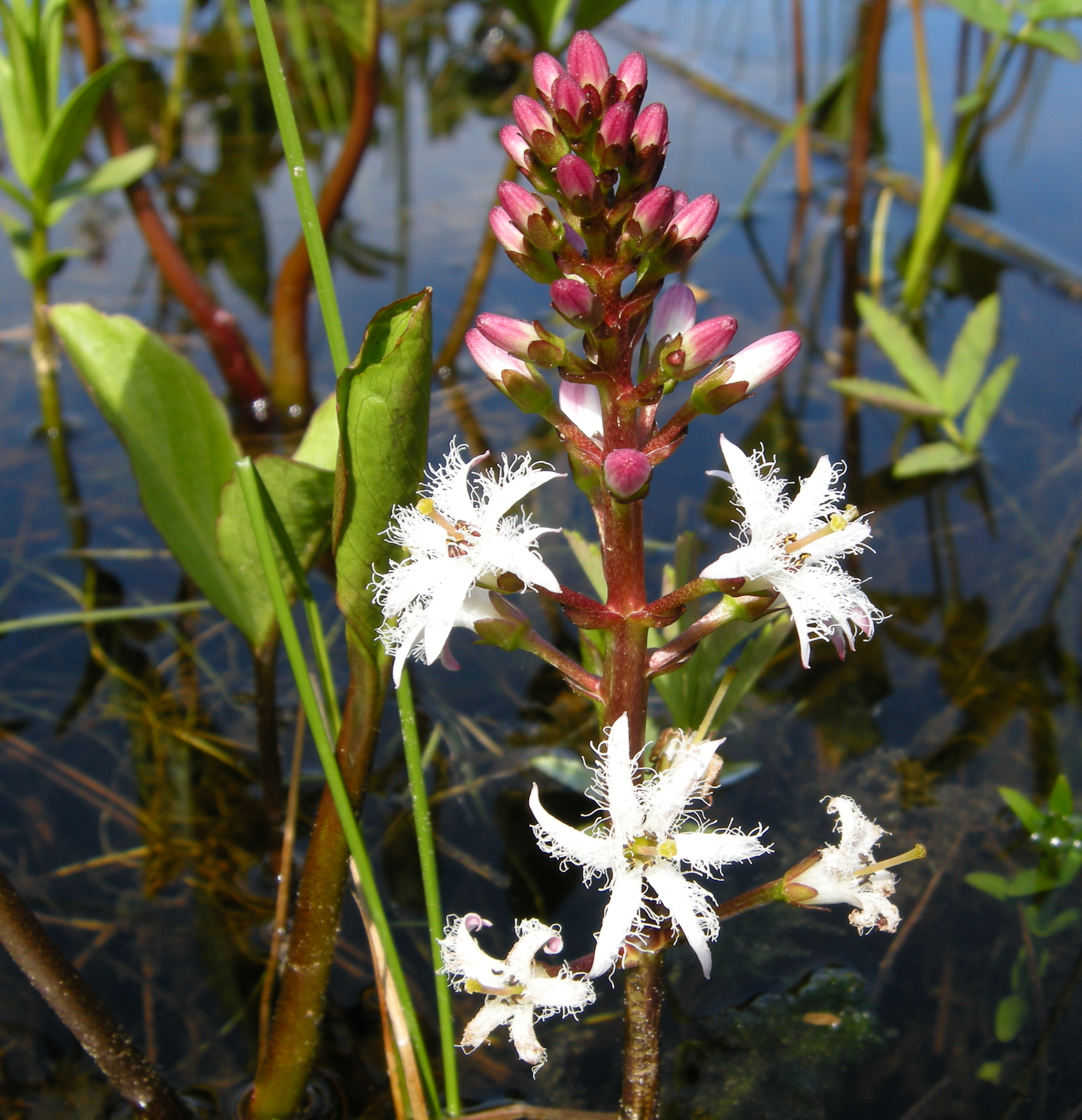

Conservation status
- Least Concern (IUCN 3.1)

- Secure (NatureServe)

Scientific classification
- Kingdom: Plantae
- Clade: Tracheophytes
- Clade: Angiosperms
- Clade: Eudicots
- Clade: Asterids
- Order: Asterales
- Family: Menyanthaceae
- Genus: Menyanthes; L.
- Species: M. trifoliata

Binomial name
- Menyanthes trifoliata L.

Synonyms
- List: Menyanthes americana Sweet; Menyanthes latifolia Raf.; Menyanthes palustris Gray; Menyanthes paradoxa Fr.; Menyanthes tridentata Raf.; Menyanthes trifoliata f. brevistyla Aver.; Menyanthes trifoliata f. macrophylla Bolzon; Menyanthes trifoliata f. microphylla Bolzon; Menyanthes trifoliata var. minor Fernald; Menyanthes trifoliata var. paradoxa Fr.; Menyanthes trifoliata subsp. verna (Raf.) Gervais & M.Parent; Menyanthes trifolium Neck.; Menyanthes verna Raf.

= Menyanthes =

Genus of flowering plants

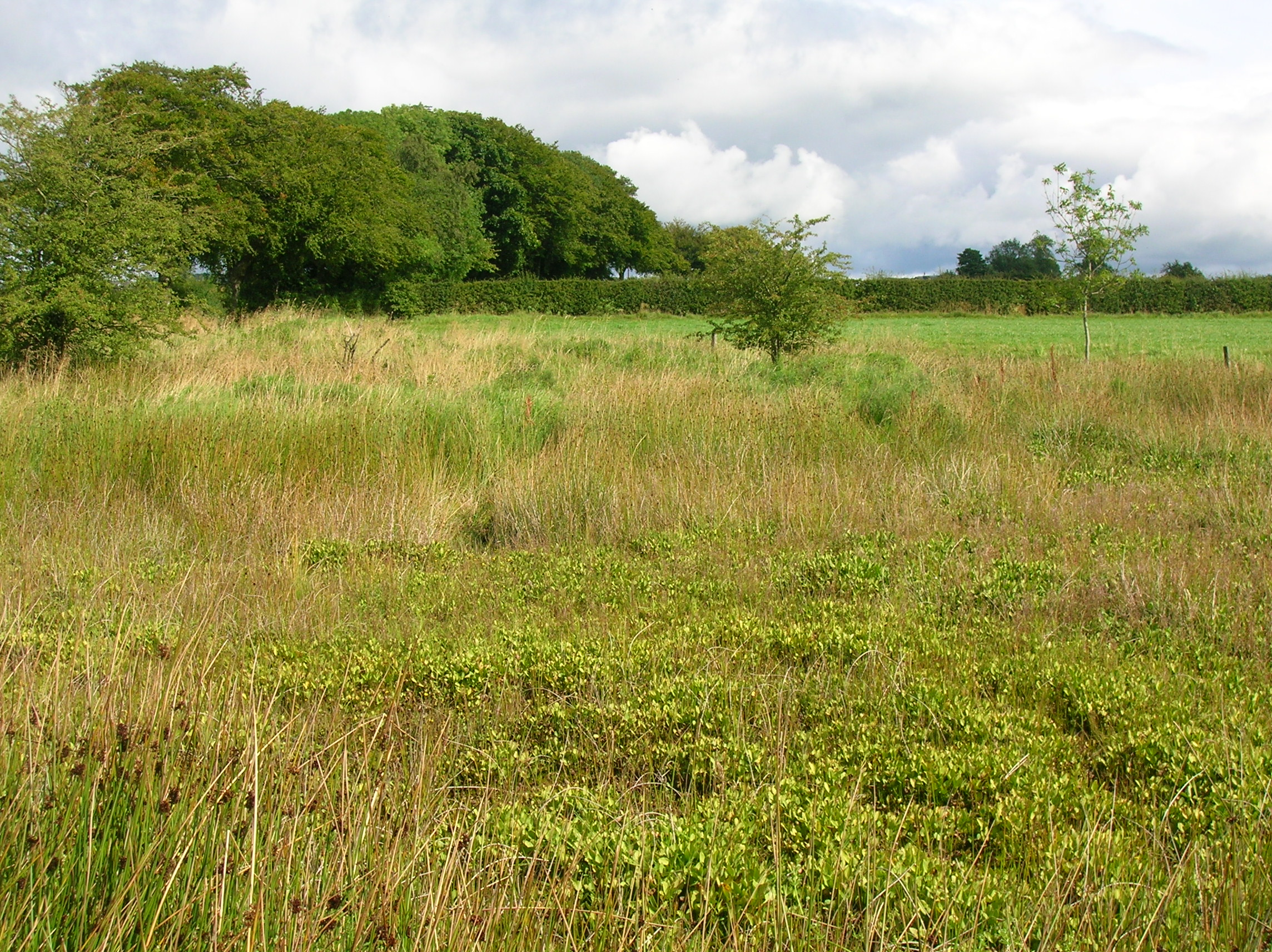
A bog-bean dominated habitat in Ayrshire, Scotland

Menyanthes is a monotypic genus of flowering plants in the family Menyanthaceae containing the single species Menyanthes trifoliata. The North American form is often referred to as M. trifoliata var. minor Michx. It is known in English by the common names bogbean, marsh trefoil and buckbean.

== Description ==
Menyanthes trifoliata has a horizontal rhizome with alternate, trifoliate leaves. The inflorescence is an erect raceme of white flowers. The buds are rose-pink in color. The flowers when fully open look like "white stars" and the petals are fringed with white whiskers.

The species occurs in fens and bogs in Asia, Europe, and North America. In eastern North America, it is considered to be a diagnostic fen species. It sometimes creates big quagmires with its thick roots.

== Taxonomy ==
The name Menyanthes comes from Greek menyein 'disclosing' and anthos 'flower' in reference to the sequential opening of flowers on the inflorescence.

=== Fossil record ===
One fossil seed of Menyanthes trifoliata has been extracted from borehole samples of the Middle Miocene fresh water deposits in Nowy Sacz Basin, West Carpathians, Poland.

== Conservation ==
The species is protected in the United States. It is a host plant to the endangered bog buck moth, Hemileuca maia menyanthevora.

== Uses ==
The rootstock can be ground into an unpalatable flour for emergency use. The plant has a characteristic strong and bitter taste, which can be used in schnapps. The British Flora Medica (1845) says about the plant: "The peasants of Westrogothia frequently use the leaves instead of hops for preserving their beer, which is thus rendered of an agreeable flavour as well as defended from acescensy".

In China, the plant is known as "sleeping herbs" (睡菜) or "herbs that calm consciousness" (暝菜). Guangdong Xing Yu (1678), a Qing dynasty book by Chiu-Da-Jun, records: "Eat [Menyanthes trifoliata;] makes people sleep well." The Compendium of Materia Medica records: "[Treats] insomnia, restlessness".
