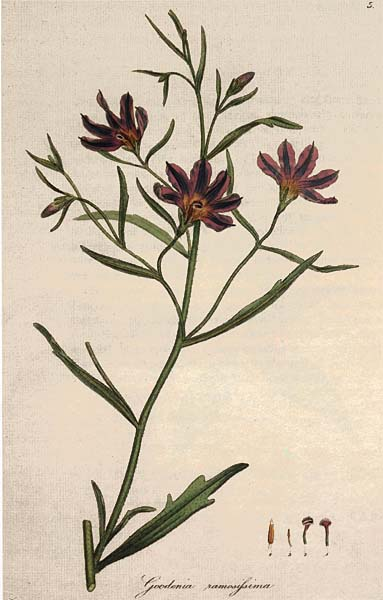
- Goodenia ramosissima

Scientific classification
- Kingdom: Plantae
- Clade: Tracheophytes
- Clade: Angiosperms
- Clade: Eudicots
- Clade: Asterids
- Order: Asterales
- Family: Goodeniaceae; R.Br.

Genera
- 12; see text.

Synonyms
- Brunoniaceae Dumort.; Scaevolaceae Lindl.

= Goodeniaceae =

Family of flowering plants

Goodeniaceae is a family of flowering plants in the order Asterales. It contains about 404 species in twelve genera. The family is distributed mostly in Australia, except for the genus Scaevola, which is pantropical. Its species are found across most of Australia, being especially common in arid and semi-arid climates.

== Morphology ==
Species in Goodeniaceae are generally herbaceous with spiral leaves. Flowers have a single plane of symmetry (monosymmetric; Brunonia being the sole exception), and are either fan-like (e.g., Scaevola) or bilabiate (as in Dampiera). Corolla lobes often have two thin marginal wings, which also occur in other families of Asterales such as the Menyanthaceae and Argophyllaceae. The style bears a pollen-cup, also known as an indusium, at the tip, a unique character for the family. The indusium has a function in secondary pollen presentation, a phenomenon also occurring in the related families Asteraceae and Campanulaceae. The ovary is inferior and the fruit is a drupe, a nut or a capsule. The seeds from capsular fruits usually have a mucilaginous wing.

== Genera ==
- Anthotium R.Br.
- Brunonia Sm.
- Coopernookia Carolin
- Dampiera R.Br.
- Diaspasis R.Br.
- Goodenia Sm.
- Lechenaultia R.Br. (syn. Leschenaultia DC.)
- Pentaptilon E.Pritz.
- Scaevola L.
- Selliera Cav.
- Velleia Sm.
- Verreauxia Benth.
