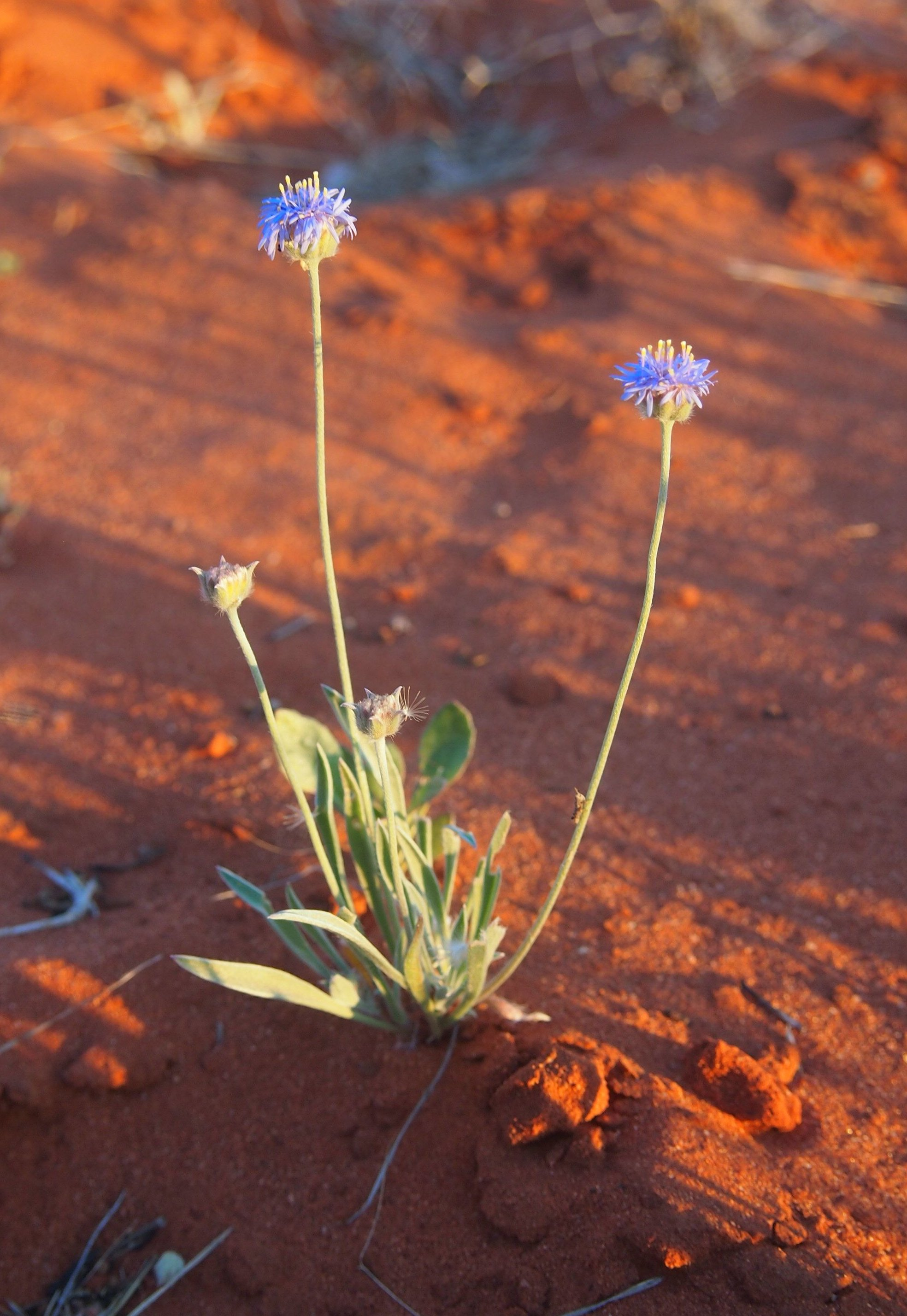

Scientific classification
- Kingdom: Plantae
- Clade: Tracheophytes
- Clade: Angiosperms
- Clade: Eudicots
- Clade: Asterids
- Order: Asterales
- Family: Goodeniaceae
- Genus: Brunonia; Sm. ex R.Br.
- Species: B. australis

Binomial name
- Brunonia australis Sm. ex R.Br.

= Brunonia =

Species of plant

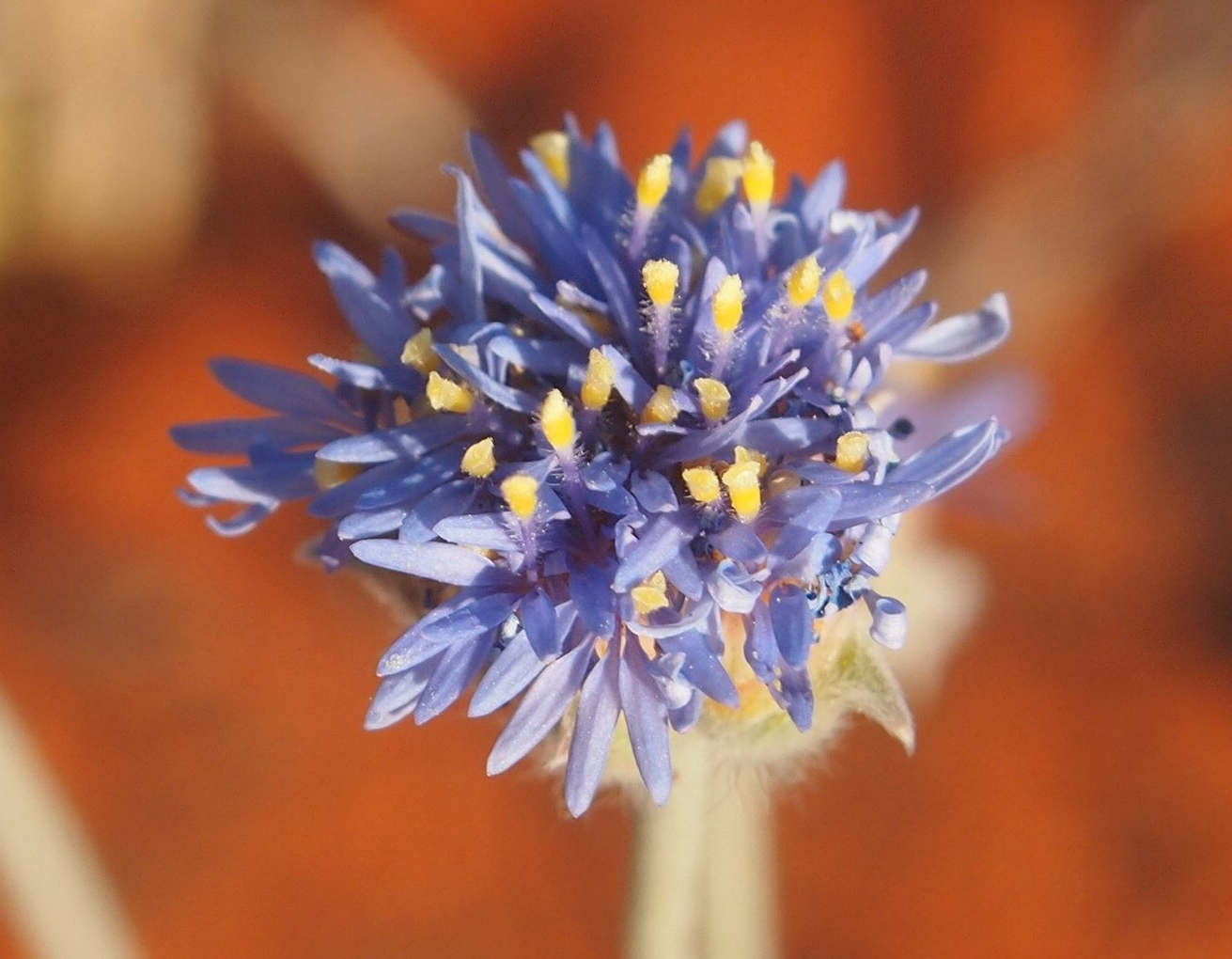
Flowers

Brunonia australis, commonly known as the blue pincushion or native cornflower, is a perennial or annual herb that grows widely across Australia. It is found in woodlands, open forest and sand plains. In Cronquist's classification scheme it was the sole member of the monogeneric plant family Brunoniaceae. The APG II system moved it into Goodeniaceae, with which it shares the stylar pollen-cup, or indusium, a character confined to these taxa. Brunonia is unique among Goodeniaceae in its radially symmetric flowers, the superior ovary and the absence of endosperm in the seeds.

The leaves are about 10 cm long and form a basal rosette. Flowering is usually in spring, with dense hemispherical clusters of numerous, small, bright blue flowers developing on several stems (scapes) up to 50 cm in height.

== Taxonomy ==
Specimens of Brunonia were first collected by Robert Brown during the 1801–02 voyage of HMS Investigator under the command of Matthew Flinders. The genus had not been published by early 1810, when members of the Linnean Society of London sought to name a plant genus in Brown's honour. This genus was settled upon because it was so difficult to classify: "The genus under consideration is... exceedingly interesting, on account of its apparent relationship to several very different natural orders, and the great difficulty of referring it to any one in particular." The name Brunonia was chosen because a genus had already been named Brownea in honour of Patrick Browne, and Brunonia was seen as a compromise, "preserving as much resemblance to his name as possible, while I avoid all ambiguity with the Brownea previously established."

In February 1810, James Edward Smith read a formal description of Brunonia to the Linnean Society. Two species were given: Brunonia australis and Brunonia sericea. Later that year, Brown made use of Smith's names in his Prodromus florae Novae Hollandiae. However, Smith's speech did not go to print until 1811, so priority of publication of the genus belongs to Brown not Smith. Thus Brown unwittingly violated a virtual botanical taboo, by naming a genus after himself.

B. sericea was reduced to a variety of B. australis in 1907, and given synonymy with B. australis in 1992. A number of other species and variety have been published, but to date none have survived as current taxa except B. australis.

== Cultivation ==
This plant is easy to propagate from seed or by dividing existing plants. However, they can be difficult to establish and may die after a few years. They should be grown in well-drained soils either in full sun or partial shade.
