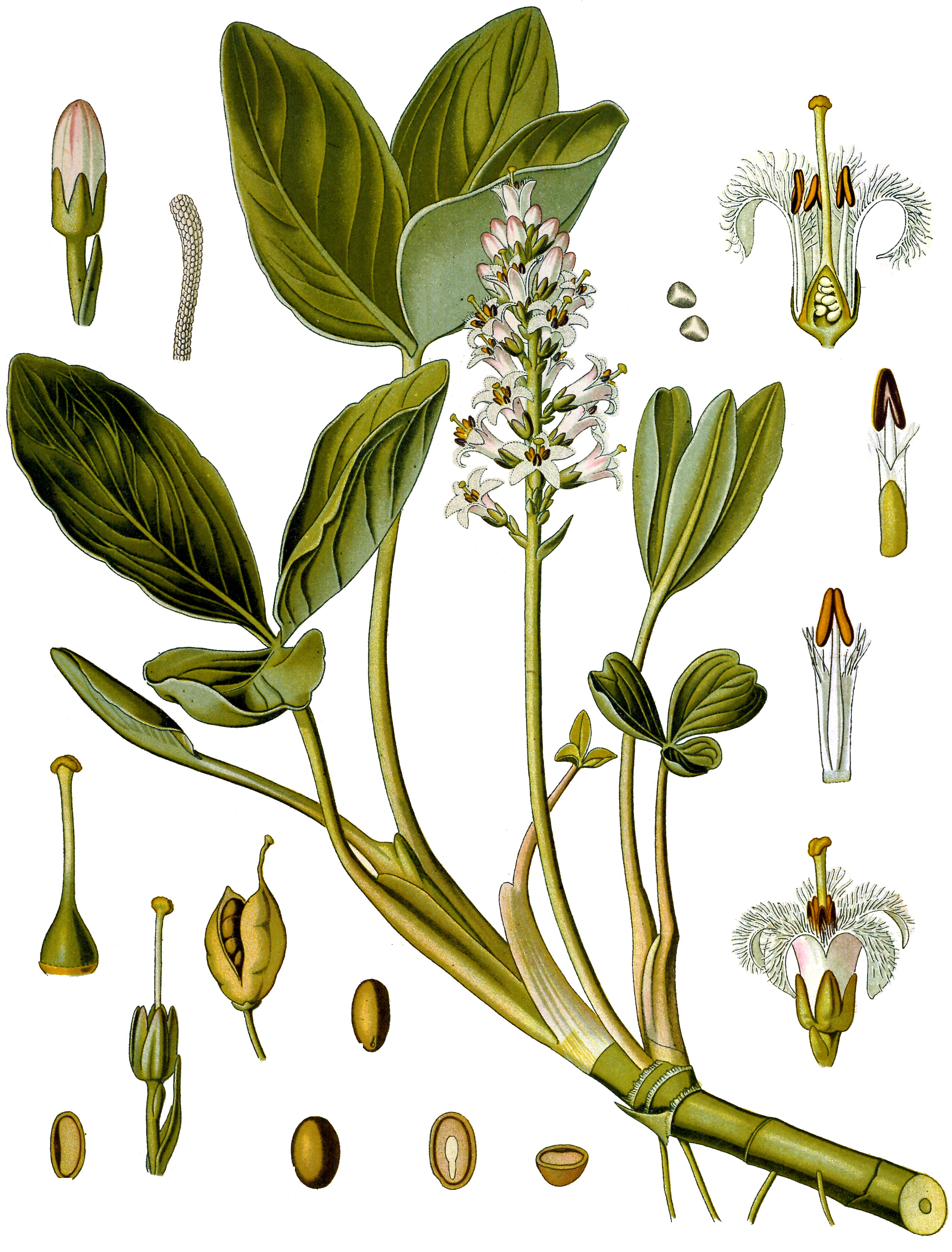
- Menyanthes trifoliata

Scientific classification
- Kingdom: Plantae
- Clade: Embryophytes
- Clade: Tracheophytes
- Clade: Spermatophytes
- Clade: Angiosperms
- Clade: Eudicots
- Clade: Asterids
- Order: Asterales
- Family: Menyanthaceae; Dumort.

Genera
- See text.

= Menyanthaceae =

Family of flowering plants

Menyanthaceae is a family of aquatic and wetland plants in the order Asterales. There are approximately 60 to 70 species in six genera distributed worldwide. The simple or compound leaves arise alternately from a creeping rhizome. In the submersed aquatic genus Nymphoides, leaves are floating and support a lax, umbellate or racemose inflorescence. In other genera the inflorescence is erect and consists of one (e.g., Liparophyllum) to many flowers. The sympetalous, insect-pollinated flowers are five-parted and either yellow or white. The petals are ciliate or adorned with lateral wings. Fruit type is a capsule.

Species of Menyanthaceae are found worldwide. The genera Menyanthes and Nephrophyllidium grow only in the northern hemisphere, while Liparophyllum and Villarsia occur only in the southern hemisphere. Nymphoides species have a cosmopolitan distribution.

Menyanthaceae species are of economic importance as ornamental water garden plants, with Nymphoides being most commonly traded. The practice of growing non-native water plants has led to several species becoming naturalized or invasive.

Dimorphic heterostyly occurs in all genera but Liparophyllum. In addition, four species of Nymphoides are dioecious.

== Genera ==
Plants of the World Online accepts the following genera:

- Liparophyllum Hook.f.
- Menyanthes L.
- Nephrophyllidium Gilg
- Nymphoides Ség.
- Ornduffia Tippery & Les
- Villarsia Vent.
